= Doomed (Bring Me the Horizon song) =

2015 song by Bring Me the Horizon

Song by Bring Me the Horizon

from the album That's the Spirit
- Released: 11 September 2015
- Length: 4:34
- Label: Sony; RCA
- Songwriters: Oliver Sykes; Jordan Fish; Lee Malia; Matt Kean; Matt Nicholls
- Producers: Jordan Fish; Oliver Sykes

"Doomed" is a song by British rock band Bring Me the Horizon. Produced by keyboardist Jordan Fish and vocalist Oliver Sykes, it was featured as the opening track on the band's 2015 fifth studio album That's the Spirit. Although it was not released as a single, the song reached number 87 on the UK Singles Chart and number four on the UK Rock & Metal Singles Chart.

== Composition and lyrics ==
"Doomed" was the first song written for That's the Spirit, although it was the last to be completed. Speaking to Loudwire, vocalist Oliver Sykes stated that he found it difficult to write the vocals for the track due to its slow pace and "stoner rock vibe", which he claimed made it "the most different song" the band had ever written up to that point. The main hook, "I think we're doomed", is sung in soft falsetto to produce a feeling of contrast with the negative tone of the lyric. This juxtaposition is also reflected in the differing styles of the song's sections, with the verses being "real claustrophobic and kinda stressful and hectic" and the choruses being "big, spacious, loose, open and relaxed", according to keyboardist Jordan Fish. Sykes expanded on the idea of contrast in the song, which he revealed was originally intended to reflect different stages of the experience of using recreational drugs.

Lyrically, "Doomed" represents the main theme of the album of "finding light out of the dark and the contrast between the two", as well as the concept of nihilism. Elaborating on this in a track-by-track commentary for Spotify, Sykes revealed that the song is "about how most of the time my life feels like this unmanageable monster that I can't keep at bay", with the first half representing the "self-destructive, nihilistic side" of him and the second outlining him "getting a second chance". It was always intended to be the first song on the album, in order to portray to listeners the change in style from the band's previous releases. TeamRock's Eleanor Goodman claimed that the song "sets the tone for the rest of the album, with sweeping dynamics framing lyrics about death and darkness", as well as proposing that the line "So come rain on my parade" related to the umbrella artwork used in promotional campaigns for the record. In a Reddit AMA ("Ask Me Anything"), keyboardist Jordan Fish revealed that "Doomed" was his favourite song on That's the Spirit.

The intro features a sample from 2000 psychological horror movie Requiem For A Dream

== Promotion and release ==
The first preview of "Doomed" was released on 28 August 2015 in the form of a 30-second teaser trailer, alongside another for the song "Follow You". It was featured as the opening track on the band's fifth studio album That's the Spirit, released on 11 September 2015, and was performed as the opening song on the majority of shows on the album's promotional tour. On 22 April 2016, "Doomed" was performed as the opening song of the band's set at the Royal Albert Hall with the Parallax Orchestra. Thomas Doyle of Rock Sound dubbed the performance "a swooning, enveloping rendition", claiming that it set high expectations for the set. Gigwise's Amy Maxwell praised it as "an exceptional way to open the show". A live video of the song's Royal Albert Hall performance was released in promotion of the album on 24 October 2016.

== Critical reception ==
Media response to "Doomed" was generally positive. Gigwise's Amy Gravelle hailed the song as "an epic introduction to the album", praising the presence of synthesizers as well as Sykes's vocal delivery. Tom Bryant of Alternative Press also praised the song's vocals, writing that "The ambient, dubby squelches of "Doomed" create nervous tension ... Then, quite from nowhere, [Sykes] finds a gorgeous melody, hitting a sweet-spot falsetto that tingles the spine". Rock Sound writer Andy Biddulph identified the album's "delicate opener" as evidence that the band were "bursting with fresh ideas and executing them to perfection".

Many commentators saw "Doomed" as one of the biggest departures from Bring Me the Horizon's previous work. Biddulph described the song as "unlike anything [the band] have attempted before", while DIY magazine's Sarah Jamieson claimed that, in addition to "Follow You", it sees the band "stepping further out of their comfort zone than ever before". On the other hand, Gravelle claimed that "Doomed" was the song on That's the Spirit which was most similar to the material on 2013's Sempiternal.

== Commercial performance ==
Following the release of That's the Spirit, "Doomed" entered the UK Singles Chart at number 87, the highest position of the seven non-single tracks from the album to chart. In the same week, the song also entered the UK Rock & Metal Singles Chart at number 4, surpassed only by the three singles previously released from That's the Spirit – "Throne", "Happy Song" and "Drown". "Doomed" remained in the top 40 until almost the end of the year. In the United States, it peaked at number 41 on the Billboard Hot Rock Songs chart.

== Charts ==
Chart performance for "Doomed"
Chart (2015)	Peak position
UK Singles (OCC)	87
UK Rock & Metal (OCC)	4
US Hot Rock & Alternative Songs (Billboard)	41

== Certifications ==
Certifications for "Doomed"
Region	Certification	Certified units/sales
Australia (ARIA)	Gold	35,000^{‡}
Mexico (AMPROFON)	Gold	30,000^{‡}
United Kingdom (BPI)	Silver	200,000^{‡}
^{‡} Sales+streaming figures based on certification alone.

== Maphra version ==
"Doomed"

Single by Maphra
- Released: 28 February 2026
- Length: 4:00
- Label: Self-released
- Songwriters: Oliver Sykes; Jordan Fish; Lee Malia; Matt Kean; Matt Nicholls
- Producer: Kevin Newland

Maphra singles chronology
"Lovely (re-imagined)" (2025)	"Doomed" (2026)	"Circle with Me" (2026)

Music video
- "Doomed" on YouTube

Singer Maphra released a cover of "Doomed" to her YouTube channel in January 2026, and subsequently released it as a single the following month; the cover has since been labelled as "viral", and received over 9.5 million views on YouTube within two months of its upload. In March, the cover reached number 1 on the Billboard Hot Hard Rock Songs chart.

On 16 May, Maphra and Bring Me the Horizon performed the song as a duet at the 2026 Sonic Temple festival.

=== Charts ===
Chart performance for "Doomed"
Chart (2026)	Peak position
US Hot Hard Rock Songs (Billboard)	1
