= The Chill Out Sessions =

EP by Bring Me the Horizon and Draper
- Released: 22 November 2012
- Recorded: December 2011
- Genre: Indietronica; chillstep
- Length: 29:25
- Label: Self-released
- Producer: Draper; Bring Me the Horizon

Bring Me the Horizon chronology
There Is a Hell... (2010)	The Chill Out Sessions (2012)	Sempiternal (2013)

Draper chronology
The Draper EP (2011)	The Chill Out Sessions (2012)	Sonder EP (2013)

Singles from The Chill Out Sessions
- 1. "Blessed with a Curse (Draper remix)" Released: 22 March 2011

The Chill Out Sessions is the second EP by British rock band Bring Me the Horizon. It consists remixes made by British electronic music producer Draper. After being initially planned to be released on New Year's Day 2012 it was delayed indefinitely by Bring Me the Horizon due to their label situation. However it was released on 22 November 2012 as a free download. The remix EP makes use of Draper's own music style named "chill-step" or "liquid-step" as a homage to his ambient, relaxing take on dubstep music.

== Background and promotion ==
As early as January 2011 suspicion arose about Bring Me the Horizon planning to release a second remix album after the success of Suicide Season: Cut Up!. However, the only remixes that existed were not made for a new CD. But the opportunity wasn't silenced as singer Oliver Sykes said "I'd love to do another record like that as I really enjoyed hearing all the songs remixed and I think it sold quite well but we haven't agreed to do another one at the moment." In a November 2011 interview Bring Me the Horizon's guitarist Lee Malia went on record in response to releasing a similar release for There is a Hell saying "I think that album was a one time only thing and I don't think we'll be doing that sort of thing again".

At the end of 2011 Bring Me the Horizon made an announcement by the band on 29 December about a new extended play titled The Chill Out Sessions, a collaborative effort with British DJ "Draper". Draper first released a "officially sanctioned" remix of the song "Blessed with a Curse" in May 2011. The EP was originally supposed to be released in time for New Year's Day and to be made available for download and purchase though Bring Me the Horizon's website. However, the EP's release was cancelled because of the band's "current management and label situation".

On 22 November 2012 the band released the collaborative EP for free.

== Composition ==
Professional ratings
Review scores
Source	Rating
Caught in the Crossfire	favourable
Kerrang!	3/5 stars

The remix EP makes use of Draper's own music style named "chill-step" or "liquid-step" as a homage to his ambient, relaxing take on dubstep music. The EP is seen as expanding upon mellow electronic undertow of the songs from the band's third album There Is a Hell... Draper also cut out all the vocal tracks containing Oliver Sykes's screams, and instead favoured the vocals of Lights (due to her voice appropriating the calming sound of the EP) and combining riffs of songs with "atmospheric bass drops".

== Track listing ==
No.	Title	Length
1.	"Crucify Me"	4:46
2.	"It Never Ends"	3:37
3.	"Fuck"	5:27
4.	"Don't Go"	3:47
5.	"Memorial/Blessed with a Curse"	6:46
6.	"Blessed with a Curse"	5:05
Total length:		29:25
