= Follow You (Bring Me the Horizon song) =

Single by Bring Me the Horizon

from the album That's the Spirit
- Released: 26 February 2016
- Genre: Pop rock; emo
- Length: 3:51
- Label: Sony; RCA
- Songwriters: Oliver Sykes; Jordan Fish; Lee Malia; Matt Kean; Matt Nicholls
- Producers: Jordan Fish; Oliver Sykes

Bring Me the Horizon singles chronology
"True Friends" (2015)	"Follow You" (2016)	"Avalanche" (2016)

Music video
- "Follow You" on YouTube

"Follow You" is a song by British rock band Bring Me the Horizon. Produced by keyboardist Jordan Fish and vocalist Oliver Sykes, it was featured on the band's 2015 fifth studio album That's the Spirit. The song was also released as the fifth single from the album on 26 February 2016, reaching number 95 on the UK Singles Chart and topping the UK Rock & Metal Singles Chart.

== Promotion and release ==
"Follow You" was first revealed in a short teaser trailer, alongside another for That's the Spirit opening track "Doomed", on 28 August 2015. Alternative Press writer Tom Bryant described it as "an emotional ballad littered with skittering electronics". Andy Biddulph of Rock Sound described it as "a love song – or the closest thing to it that this band has ever written", and as a "cross between PVRIS and Linkin Park". In a pre-release review of the album, Gigwise's Amy Gravelle noted that "Follow You" sees Sykes "pour[ing] out his heart in an emotional epilogue". It is categorized as a pop rock song with hip hop influenced beats by Emmy Mack of Music Feeds. On 26 February 2016, the track was released as a single in the form of a limited edition 7" vinyl.

== Composition and lyrics ==
Bring Me the Horizon vocalist Oliver Sykes and keyboardist Jordan Fish originally started writing "Follow You" at around the same time as they wrote "Drown", which was released as a single in 2014. According to Sykes, the song's lyrics were based on his relationship with his wife during "a particular rough patch, when things weren't looking too good"; during a track-by-track commentary of the album for Spotify, he explained that the overarching message was that "no matter how bad being together can sometimes get, the alternative is just so much worse".

== Music video ==
The music video for "Follow You" was premiered on 16 March 2016 via the band's Vevo channel. Co-directed by Bring Me the Horizon frontman Oliver Sykes and Frank Borin, the video depicts a series of violent events described by a number of commentators as leading to the end of the world, including seemingly random acts of violence, murder, arson and property damage, as a young man listens to the song, dances and sings in the street, oblivious to the events around him. Loudwire's Joe DiVita proposed that while the video was "brutally graphic" and "NSFW", this served as "the perfect juxtaposition" to the "somber and emotional song" to which it was the visual accompaniment. Alternative Press writer Caitlyn Ralph merely described it as "intriguing".

The video was noted by many critics for its graphic nature. Rock Sound writer Andy Biddulph, for example, described the video as "horrifying", noting that it contained "gore, death, guns and violence against animals". Similarly, James Hingle of Kerrang! warned that it was "not for the faint-hearted". Of particular contention was a scene in which a Golden Retriever is shot and killed by a mail carrier. Fuse's Zach Dionne reacted to the video simply with the phrase "What the fuck", before berating it as "an immense misstep" by the band. Emmy Mack of Music Feeds displayed shock at the video, describing it as "a gruesome, NSFW fucking bloodbath", although did praise the production by noting that "The whole thing is a god damn motherfucking horror movie. But at least it's a blockbuster one." Bring Me the Horizon later responded to the controversy on Twitter, joking about the dog's fate.

== Critical reception ==
Critical response to "Follow You" was generally positive. Bradley Zorgdrager of Exclaim! praised the song for "reigning in the force while remaining impactful", in contrast to much of the rest of the album which he criticised for sounding too similar to bands such as Thirty Seconds to Mars and Linkin Park. MTV's Mike Pell described the song as "One of the tamer, more anthemic singles" from That's the Spirit. Reviewing the album for DIY magazine, Sarah Jamieson identified "Follow You" as one of the album's tracks which sees Bring Me the Horizon "stepping further out of their comfort zone than ever before", describing it as "atmospheric".

== Commercial performance ==
"Follow You" entered the UK Rock & Metal Singles Chart at number six on 18 September 2015, following the release of That's the Spirit, when it also registered on the main UK Singles Chart for a solitary week at number 95. After moving up and down the top ten for a number of months, it later topped the UK Rock & Metal Singles Chart on 25 March 2016, replacing A Day to Remember's "Paranoia". In the United States, the track reached number 34 on the Billboard Hot Rock Songs chart.

== Track listing ==
7" vinyl
No.	Title	Length
1.	"Follow You"	3:51
Total length:		3:51

CD single
No.	Title	Length
1.	"Follow You"	3:51
2.	"Follow You" (instrumental)	3:51
Total length:		7:42

== Personnel ==
Credits adapted from Tidal.

Bring Me the Horizon

- Oliver Sykes – lead vocals, production, composition, programming
- Lee Malia – guitars, composition
- Matt Kean – bass, composition
- Matt Nicholls – drums, composition
- Jordan Fish – keyboards, synthesizers, programming, percussion, backing vocals, production, composition, engineering

Additional musicians

- Maddie Cutter – cello
- Will Harvey – violin

Additional personnel

- Al Groves – engineering
- Sam Winfield – engineering
- Nikos Goudinakis – assistant engineering
- Ted Jensen – mastering
- Dan Lancaster – mixing

== Charts ==
Chart performance for "Follow You"
Chart (2015–16)	Peak position
UK Singles (Official Charts)	95
UK Rock & Metal (Official Charts)	1
US Hot Rock & Alternative Songs (Billboard)	34

== Certifications ==
Certifications for "Follow You"
Region	Certification	Certified units/sales
Australia (ARIA)	Gold	35,000^{‡}
Brazil (Pro-Música Brasil)	Gold	30,000^{‡}
Mexico (AMPROFON)	Platinum+Gold	90,000^{‡}
United Kingdom (BPI)	Gold	400,000^{‡}
^{‡} Sales+streaming figures based on certification alone.
