= That's the Spirit =

- Physical cover

Studio album by Bring Me the Horizon
- Released: 11 September 2015
- Studios: Black Rock Studios (Santorini); Studio 91 (Newbury, Berkshire); Drop Dead (Sheffield)
- Genres: Alternative rock; alternative metal; hard rock; electronic rock; arena rock; pop rock
- Length: 45:00
- Labels: Sony; Columbia; RCA
- Producers: Jordan Fish; Oli Sykes

Bring Me the Horizon chronology
Live at Wembley (2015)	That's the Spirit (2015)	Live at the Royal Albert Hall (2016)

Singles from That's the Spirit
- 1. "Drown" Released: 21 October 2014; 2. "Happy Song" Released: 13 July 2015; 3. "Throne" Released: 24 July 2015; 4. "True Friends" Released: 20 November 2015; 5. "Follow You" Released: 26 February 2016; 6. "Avalanche" Released: 23 June 2016; 7. "Oh No" Released: 18 November 2016

Alternative cover
- Digital/streaming cover

That's the Spirit is the fifth studio album by the British rock band Bring Me the Horizon. The album was released on 11 September 2015, and marks a departure from the group's metalcore roots, in favour of a less aggressive alternative rock style.

The album debuted at number one in Australia and Canada, as well as number two on the UK Albums Chart and the US Billboard 200. The album received universal acclaim from music critics.

== Background ==
The band started teasing the album in late June when the band started promoting images of a symbol of an umbrella, all in the form of tattoos, stickers and posters posted around England, which would later be revealed as a promotional symbol for the album's first single. The band later released a short video in early July where the words "That's the spirit" were spoken in reverse. On 13 July, the band announced they had left their previous label Epitaph Records and signed fully with Sony Music subsidiaries RCA and Columbia.

In an interview with NME, vocalist Oliver Sykes confirmed the album title being That's the Spirit while also mentioning several song titles as "True Friends", "Avalanche", "Throne" and "Blasphemy".

== Writing and recording ==
Keyboardist Jordan Fish played the role as producer for the album along with Sykes, considering an external producer unnecessary. The band also hired a personal fitness trainer during the album's recording process.

== Composition ==
In an interview with NME, Sykes said that the album is a loose concept album about life's darker moods, such as depression, and a way of making light of it. He cited the alternative rock bands Jane's Addiction, Panic! at the Disco, Interpol and Radiohead as influences for the new album. Jon Wiederhorn of Rolling Stone stated that the album marks a change for Bring Me the Horizon from a sound "undeniably rooted in metal" to a "sound full of ebb-and-flow dynamics inspired by indie rock, alternative music and pop" in an "evolution from artsy metalcore to cinematic pop rock", and that it sounds more like Muse and Linkin Park than Metallica and Lamb of God. Similarly, Daniel Furnari of Blunt Magazine suggested that "That's The Spirit sees Bring Me The Horizon push things further than ever with a collection of stadium-standard alt-rock anthems more suited to Glastonbury than Warped Tour ... For perhaps the first time, Bring Me The Horizon have produced a record with no throwbacks to the Suicide Season days of outrageous mosh calls and downtuned riff insanity."

Featuring characteristics of electronic music, That's the Spirit is considered an alternative rock, alternative metal, electronic rock, arena rock, and hard rock album by several online platforms, such as AllMusic, Toronto Sun, and Blunt Magazine. Its style has also been described as pop rock by some music critics. Sites such as The Guardian and St. Cloud Times have described it as nu metal.

== Promotion and release ==
The band's first single released from the album before its announcement was "Drown" on 21 October 2014. The second single was "Happy Song", released on 12 July 2015. The third was "Throne", which was accompanied with a music video and the official announcement of the album's track listing and cover art. Fish explains that "Throne" reflects the group's then current state of mind both musically and emotionally, going to say that it was one of the most straight forward songs they had recorded, but felt that it was an obvious choice for a single due to its immediate catchy-ness and level of energy. "True Friends", was released as a single on 22 August along an official lyric video. It was also released in form of a limited edition 7" vinyl. A music video for the track "Follow You" was premiered on 16 March 2016 via the band's Vevo channel. It was co-directed by frontman Oliver Sykes and Frank Borin. On 26 February 2016, it was also released as a single in the form of a limited edition 7" vinyl. "Avalanche" was released as a single on 23 June 2016, being played in Radio 1's Big Weekend. A live music video was also premiered for the song. "Oh No" was released as the final single from That's the Spirit on 18 November 2016 in a radio edit version. Its music video was directed by Isaac Eastgate and premiered via Rolling Stone on 3 November 2016.

The band set up an intimate album launch performance on September 6, 2015, at the Rose Theatre, Kingston and embarked on a tour throughout October 2015 in North America, which also featured American festivals such as Aftershock Festival and Knotfest and was supported by metal band Issues and rock band Pvris. The band also played a European Tour in November 2015

== Reception ==
=== Critical reception ===
Professional ratings
Aggregate scores
Source	Rating
Metacritic	88/100
Review scores
Source	Rating
AllMusic	4.5/5 stars
Alternative Press	5/5 stars
Blunt Magazine	4.5/5 stars
DIY	4/5 stars
The Guardian	3/5 stars
Impericon	90%
Kerrang!	5/5 stars
Metal Hammer	4/5 stars
Q	4/5 stars
Rock Sound	10/10

Like the band's last two albums, That's the Spirit was met with critical acclaim from music critics. At Metacritic (a review aggregator site which assigns a normalised rating out of 100 from music critics), based on 10 critics, the album has received a score of 88/100, which indicates "universal acclaim".

Daniel Furnari of Blunt Magazine wrote: "[On That's the Spirit,] Oli Sykes powers through every enormous chorus and infectious verse with a confidence and finesse that would have you believe he’s been singing like this for years." Andy Biddulph of Rock Sound stated that the band sounded "so accomplished" on the album, "bursting with fresh ideas" and says that no other band "incorporates synth and atmospherics into music" the way they did in the song "Run", and comparing Sykes' singing on "Avalanche" to Linkin Park. James Christopher Monger at AllMusic stated "What's most surprising is how natural it all feels, but that's due in large part to the long-form recalibration of the band's sound. By entering the mainstream one limb (album) at a time, Bring Me the Horizon are merely reaping what they've sown, and longtime fans should already feel acclimated to the water." In addition to Linkin Park, Monger compared the choruses from the album to Avenged Sevenfold, Thirty Seconds to Mars and late 1990s Metallica.

=== Accolades ===
The album was ranked at number two in Alternative Press's "10 Essential Records of 2015" list. Matt Crane of Alternative Press wrote that the album shows a "genuine evolution for the band." He named "Happy Song" as providing the band "rock-radio potential" and "Throne" as "an aggressive, exotic take on the groove-based synth-rock" that was popularised by Linkin Park. The album was included at number one on Rock Sound's top 50 releases of 2015 list. That's the Spirit was nominated for Album of the Year at the 2016 Alternative Press Music Awards.

Publication	Accolade	Year	Rank
NME	NME's Albums of the Year 2015	2015	49

== Commercial performance ==
On 14 September 2015, The Official Chart Update reported that That's the Spirit was on track to debut atop the UK Albums Chart, being just 1,000 copies ahead of Keep the Village Alive by the Stereophonics. However, four days later, after one of the closest chart battles of 2015, Keep the Village Alive beat That's the Spirit to number one by a margin of less than 1,300 copies, denying Bring Me the Horizon their first ever chart-topper.

The album also debuted at number one in Australia, giving the band their third consecutive number-one album there. That's the Spirit has sold 130,000 copies in the US as of February 2016.

== Track listing ==
All lyrics are written by Oli Sykes; all music is composed by Bring Me the Horizon

No.	Title	Length
1.	"Doomed"	4:34
2.	"Happy Song"	3:59
3.	"Throne"	3:11
4.	"True Friends"	3:52
5.	"Follow You"	3:51
6.	"What You Need"	4:12
7.	"Avalanche"	4:22
8.	"Run"	3:42
9.	"Drown"	3:42
10.	"Blasphemy"	4:35
11.	"Oh No"	5:01
Total length:		45:00

== Personnel ==
Credits adapted from the album's liner notes.

Bring Me the Horizon

- Oli Sykes – vocals, production
- Lee Malia – guitars
- Jordan Fish – electronics, backing vocals, production, additional engineering
- Matt Kean – bass
- Matt Nicholls – drums

Additional musicians

- Will Harvey – violins (1–5, 7, 10, 11)
- Maddie Cutter – cellos (1–5, 7, 10, 11)
- Emma Fish – additional vocals (2)

Additional personnel

- Al Groves – engineering
- Nikos Goudinakis – assistant engineering
- Sam Winfield – additional engineering
- Dan Lancaster – mixing
- Ted Jensen – mastering
- Maxim Scott – artwork

== Charts ==
=== Weekly charts ===
Weekly chart performance for That's the Spirit
Chart (2015)	Peak position
Australian Albums (ARIA)	1
Austrian Albums (Ö3 Austria)	4
Belgian Albums (Ultratop Flanders)	5
Belgian Albums (Ultratop Wallonia)	21
Canadian Albums (Billboard)	1
Danish Albums (Hitlisten)	31
Dutch Albums (Album Top 100)	5
Finnish Albums (Suomen virallinen lista)	9
French Albums (SNEP)	30
German Albums (Offizielle Top 100)	6
Hungarian Albums (MAHASZ)	27
Irish Albums (IRMA)	4
Italian Albums (FIMI)	17
Japanese Albums (Oricon)	53
New Zealand Albums (RMNZ)	2
Norwegian Albums (VG-lista)	8
Portuguese Albums (AFP)	18
Scottish Albums (Official Charts)	2
Spanish Albums (Promusicae)	10
Swedish Albums (Sverigetopplistan)	3
Swiss Albums (Schweizer Hitparade)	8
UK Albums (Official Charts)	2
UK Rock & Metal Albums (Official Charts)	1
US Billboard 200	2
US Top Alternative Albums (Billboard)	1
US Top Hard Rock Albums (Billboard)	1
US Top Rock Albums (Billboard)	1

Chart (2025)	Peak position
German Rock & Metal Albums (Offizielle Top 100)	3
Polish Albums (ZPAV)	49

=== Year-end charts ===
Year-end chart performance for That's the Spirit
Chart (2015)	Position
Australian Albums (ARIA)	37
Belgian Albums (Ultratop Flanders)	150
UK Albums (OCC)	60
US Top Hard Rock Albums (Billboard)	15
US Top Rock Albums (Billboard)	46
Chart (2016)	Position
Australian Albums (ARIA)	91
Belgian Albums (Ultratop Flanders)	110
UK Albums (OCC)	96
US Top Rock Albums (Billboard)	67

== Certifications ==
Certifications for That's the Spirit
Region	Certification	Certified units/sales
Australia (ARIA)	Platinum	70,000^{‡}
Canada (Music Canada)	Gold	40,000^{‡}
Denmark (IFPI Danmark)	Gold	10,000^{‡}
Germany (BVMI)	Gold	100,000^{‡}
Italy (FIMI)	Gold	25,000^{‡}
New Zealand (RMNZ)	Gold	7,500^{‡}
Poland (ZPAV)	Platinum	20,000^{‡}
Sweden (GLF)	Gold	15,000^{‡}
United Kingdom (BPI)	Platinum	423,120
United States (RIAA)	Gold	500,000^{‡}
^{‡} Sales+streaming figures based on certification alone.

== See also ==
- List of number-one albums of 2015 (Australia)
