= Follow You =

Follow You may refer to:

- "Follow You" (Deniz Koyu song), 2012
- "Follow You" (Bring Me the Horizon song), 2015
- "Follow You" (Imagine Dragons song), 2021
- "Follow You", by Echosmith from the album Lonely Generation
- "Follow You", by Au5 featuring Danyka Nadeau
