= True Friends (song) =

Single by Bring Me the Horizon

from the album That's the Spirit
- Released: 20 November 2015
- Genre: Post-hardcore; punk rock; emo
- Length: 3:52
- Label: Sony; RCA
- Songwriters: Oliver Sykes; Jordan Fish; Lee Malia; Matt Kean; Matt Nicholls
- Producers: Jordan Fish; Oliver Sykes

Bring Me the Horizon singles chronology
"Throne" (2015)	"True Friends" (2015)	"Follow You" (2016)

Music video
- "True Friends" on YouTube

"True Friends" is a song by British rock band Bring Me the Horizon. Produced by keyboardist Jordan Fish and vocalist Oliver Sykes, it was featured on the band's 2015 fifth studio album That's the Spirit. The song was also released as the fourth single from the album on 20 November 2015, reaching number 91 on the UK Singles Chart and topping the UK Rock & Metal Singles Chart.

== Promotion and release ==
"True Friends" was first released on 23 August 2015 in the form of a lyric video on the band's official YouTube channel, after being teased by the band for a number of days. It was reportedly due to be premiered on Zane Lowe's Beats 1 radio show on Apple Music, but this was cancelled. On 20 November, the song was released as a single in the form of a limited edition 7" vinyl.

== Composition and lyrics ==
"True Friends" is a song about disloyalty. Speaking to TeamRock, vocalist Oliver Sykes has explained that the hook "True Friends stab you in the front" is based on a quote credited to Irish playwright Oscar Wilde. The song is "not about anyone in particular", although Sykes has revealed that "It's about some people more than it is others, but it's all about one event in particular that spurred it on. It's about people that I thought were my friends, my very good friends, doing something to me that I just didn't see coming in a way I never thought they would."

In a track-by-track commentary of That's the Spirit for Spotify, the frontman added that "True Friends" is about "coming to peace with [anger] ... [and] letting those people know that I can forget but never forgive". In his review of That's the Spirit, David Renshaw for the NME claimed that on "True Friends", Sykes "maintains a sense of paranoia and emotional vulnerability amid the cavernous sounds". The song has been noted to "unleashed their [Bring Me the Horizon] inner emo kid".

== Music video ==
The music video for "True Friends" was directed by Bring Me the Horizon frontman Oliver Sykes and released on 5 November 2015. Described as a "murder mystery revolving around a family" by TeamRock's Luke Morton, it features a story which "centers on a detective (Steve Oram) who is being haunted by his own past misdeeds". The video was praised by Loudwire's Chad Childers, who described it as "a powerful storytelling tool" and "one of the more chilling and intense videos of the year". Similarly, DIY magazine's Jamie Milton praised the video's "thriller epic plot" and dramatic nature. In November, the band also released a video of their live performance of the song at Webster Hall in New York City earlier in the year.

== Critical reception ==
Writing for Gigwise, Will Butler claimed that "True Friends" was "in keeping with the more accessible sounds of 'Happy Song' and 'Throne'", describing it as "aggressive". Rock Sound writer Andy Biddulph dubbed it an "angsty, fist-pumping arena rock anthem" which he claimed was "ready-made for pyro blasts and sold-out arenas". Emmy Mack of Music Feeds claimed that "True Friends" was "bordering dangerously on emo", as well as describing it as the track which is closest to the post-hardcore genre on the album. On the other hand, AllMusic's James Christopher Monger criticised the main hook of the song, which he described as a "second-hand embarrassment-inducing" lyric.

== Commercial performance ==
"True Friends" entered the UK Rock & Metal Singles Chart at number 2 on 28 August 2015, before registering on the main UK Singles Chart at number 91 three weeks later. After moving up and down the top ten for a number of weeks, it later topped the UK Rock & Metal Singles Chart on 27 November, replacing Fall Out Boy's "Centuries". In the United States, the track reached number 22 on the Billboard Hot Rock Songs chart. Elsewhere, it peaked at number 74 on the Belgian Ultratip chart in the Flanders region.

== Personnel ==
Credits adapted from Tidal.

Bring Me the Horizon

- Oliver Sykes – lead vocals, production, composition, programming
- Lee Malia – guitars, composition
- Matt Kean – bass, composition
- Matt Nicholls – drums, composition
- Jordan Fish – keyboards, synthesizers, programming, percussion, backing vocals, production, composition, engineering

Additional musicians

- Maddie Cutter – cello
- Will Harvey – violin

Additional personnel

- Al Groves – engineering
- Sam Winfield – engineering
- Nikos Goudinakis – assistant engineering
- Ted Jensen – mastering
- Dan Lancaster – mixing

== Charts ==
Chart performance for "True Friends"
Chart (2015)	Peak position
Belgian Singles (Ultratip Flanders)	74
UK Singles (Official Charts)	91
UK Rock & Metal (Official Charts)	2
US Hot Rock & Alternative Songs (Billboard)	22

== Certifications ==
Certifications for "True Friends"
Region	Certification	Certified units/sales
Australia (ARIA)	Platinum	70,000^{‡}
Brazil (Pro-Música Brasil)	Gold	30,000^{‡}
Poland (ZPAV)	Gold	10,000^{‡}
United Kingdom (BPI)	Silver	200,000^{‡}
^{‡} Sales+streaming figures based on certification alone.
