= Motor Museum =

UK music recording studio

Coordinates: 53.3809°N 2.9455°W

The Motor Museum
- Type: Recording studio
- Industry: Music
- Predecessor: The Pink Museum
- Founded: 1988; 38 years ago in Liverpool, England
- Founder: Hambi Haralambous
- Headquarters: 1 Hesketh St, Liverpool, L17 8XJ, Liverpool, England
- Key people: Al Groves
- Owner: Andy McCluskey
- Website: themotormuseum.com

The Motor Museum (previously called the Pink Museum) is a music recording studio based in the Lark Lane area of Liverpool, England, and owned by Andy McCluskey.

A number of popular music artists have recorded at the premises, including The 1975, Jake Bugg, OMD, Oasis, Ben Howard, Arctic Monkeys, The Coral, and Atomic Kitten.

== History ==
=== The Pink Museum (1988-1999) ===
The name of the studios originates from its building's former use as the Lark Lane Motor Museum, an automotive museum. In 1987 the museum closed, and members of Echo & the Bunnymen encouraged Liverpool musician Hambi Haralambous to build a new studio on the site. Haralambous enlisted the oversight of Phill Newell, who was responsible for Virgin's Manor and Townhouse Studios, to convert the 240 square meter warehouse into a recording studio. The Pink Museum recording studio, an amalgamation of to Haralambous' previous The Pink Studio and the Lark Lane Motor Museum, opened in 1988, hosting such clients as British reggae band Aswad, and members of Liverpool F.C., who recorded "Anfield Rap" at the new studio. In 1990, Andy McCluskey booked a three day session at The Pink Museum that went so well that Orchestral Manoeuvres in the Dark recorded their 1991 album Sugar Tax at the studio. Other early clients of the studio included China Crisis, The Christians, and Echo & the Bunnymen.

In addition to the usual array of equipment typical of most professional recording environments, the Motor Museum has a number of special features which have been credited with giving both the creative and recording process a unique edge, including its stone room, which adds unique ambient quality to recordings, especially those of drums. The effect of the stone room can be heard on many of the tracks recorded at the Motor Museum, such as at the start of “Supersonic” by Oasis.

=== The Motor Museum (1999-present) ===
In 1999, studio founder Haralambous decided to pursue a film-making career, and sold the studio to McCluskey, who renamed it The Motor Museum. producer Mike Crossey used it as a base for recording the Arctic Monkeys and Blood Red Shoes, and began leasing the studio from McCluskey in 2009. The same year, the studio began partnering with Miloco.

In 2013, Al Groves took over as the Motor Museum's manager and resident producer. Already an established producer on the Liverpool music scene, he has continued the work of establishing the Motor Museum's reputation as one of the most desirable recording locations in the UK, having worked with artists like The Tea Street Band and Bring Me the Horizon.
