= Blunt Magazine =

Australian digital music and culture publication

- Categories: Music magazine
- Founded: 1999
- Final issue: 2016 (print)
- Country: Australia
- Based in: Sydney
- Language: English
- Website: www.bluntmag.com.au

Blunt Magazine is an Australian digital music and culture publication based in Sydney. Previously published in print, the magazine is now predominantly online, with occasional physical releases. Historically associated with alternative and heavy music culture, the magazine has featured artists including A Day to Remember, Bring Me the Horizon, Paramore, Green Day and Parkway Drive.

== History and profile ==
Blunt was founded in 1999. It was previously published by Next Media. The magazine was historically based in Sydney and covered alternative, punk, rock and heavy music.

The magazine, which had been on hiatus since 2016, was relaunched digitally under new ownership in 2020.

In 2025, the publication underwent a broader editorial expansion under publisher Joel King, increasing its focus on alternative culture, film, gaming and digital media alongside music journalism.

In June 2025, it was announced that Blunt Magazine would expand into the United States with the launch of Blunt US, focused on American heavy and alternative music coverage.
