= Happy Song (Bring Me the Horizon song) =

Single by Bring Me the Horizon

from the album That's the Spirit
- Released: 13 July 2015
- Genre: Nu metal
- Length: 3:59
- Label: Sony; RCA
- Songwriters: Oliver Sykes; Jordan Fish; Lee Malia; Matt Kean; Matt Nicholls
- Producers: Jordan Fish; Oliver Sykes

Bring Me the Horizon singles chronology
"Drown" (2014)	"Happy Song" (2015)	"Throne" (2015)

"Happy Song" is a song by British rock band Bring Me the Horizon. Produced by keyboardist Jordan Fish and vocalist Oliver Sykes, it was featured on the band's 2015 fifth studio album That's the Spirit and released as the second single from the album on 13 July 2015. The single topped the UK Rock & Metal Singles Chart and reached number 55 on the UK Singles Chart, number 2 on the US Billboard Mainstream Rock chart and number 19 on the Billboard Hot Rock Songs chart.

One of the first songs written for the album, "Happy Song" embodies the main theme of That's the Spirit, with lyrics primarily written about depression. Due to its repeated use of the titular phrase, the song is considered the unofficial title track of the album, and has been performed as the opening song at the majority of dates on the album's promotional concert tour. Many critics have hailed the track as a highlight of the album, praising its heavier style and prominent guitar riff.

== Promotion and release ==
In the weeks leading up to the release of "Happy Song", Bring Me the Horizon teased news of their upcoming fifth studio album That's the Spirit by sharing images of the album's umbrella artwork and the smiley face cover for the single. On 12 July 2015, the song was premiered on the BBC Radio 1 Rock Show with Daniel P. Carter as that day's "Rockest Record", before it was made available for individual purchase online. In September, it was released as a limited edition 7" vinyl exclusive to HMV. No music video was produced for the track, although a live video filmed at Leeds Festival in August 2015 was released in October, which featured a parody health and safety video introduction described by DIY magazine's Tom Connick as "loony". Also in October, the song (along with "Throne") was used as an official theme song for the professional wrestling show NXT TakeOver: Respect. In October 2015, the song was featured during a montage sequence on the Castle season 8 episode "PhDead". In March 2016, it was featured on the soundtrack of the video game EA Sports UFC 2. The song was later included on the video game soundtrack for WWE 2K22, released in 2022.

On 17 February 2016, Bring Me the Horizon played "Happy Song" at the NME Awards show in London. During the performance, frontman Oliver Sykes jumped on the table at which Godlike Genius award winners Coldplay were sitting, causing it to collapse. Some news writers claimed that Sykes had intentionally targeted Coldplay as a "protest", although the vocalist later responded by confirming that "It was in no way a protest against Coldplay". Coldplay frontman Chris Martin reacted positively, describing the incident as "great, very rock n roll". Writing about the event, the NME praised the group's performance as "a real reminder of the power of raw performance ... it went down an absolute storm".

== Composition and lyrics ==
Happy Song
"Happy Song" features heavy use of guitars.

In line with the loose concept of That's the Spirit, the lyrics for "Happy Song" were written about "making light of a shitty situation", in particular referring to depression. Due to its use of the phrase "that's the spirit", the song has been described by the band's frontman Oliver Sykes as the album's "unofficial title track". Speaking in a track-by-track commentary for Spotify, the vocalist described the phrase as "ironically bleak", noting that "It's only ever really used by people when they have no idea what to say. There's no answer, no solution; the only thing you can say is just 'get on with it', and that's what "Happy Song" is all about".

Speaking to DJ Annie Mac, guitarist Lee Malia revealed that the band were influenced by Rage Against the Machine on "Happy Song", with Sykes adding that their intention with the track was to create "something heavy ... but not the same heavy you've heard from us before". The vocalist also recalled that it was "the first heavy song [the band] wrote on the record", suggesting that it "set the tone for the rest of the album". The track features a prominent children's group vocal section throughout, as well as string and brass instruments in places, built around a number of notable guitar riffs. The song has been categorised as nu metal with grunge influences.

== Critical reception ==
Revealing news of the track's release, Rock Sound writer Andy Biddulph described "Happy Song" as "absolutely massive", and in a review of That's the Spirit later dubbed it "epic, thunderous and skyscraping in equal measure". Gigwise's Andrew Trendell also dubbed the song "massive", describing it as "a monolothic [sic] slab of rock – and a promising sign of things to come". Music Feeds writer Emmy Mack described the song as "a monstrous new rock anthem", comparing it to the music of Royal Blood by dubbing it "a throbbing, chugging rock belter". AllMusic's James Christopher Monger selected "Happy Song" as the highlight from That's the Spirit, describing it as "auspicious" and "fevered".

Some critics claimed that "Happy Song" joined previous single "Drown" in marking a stylistic departure from the band's earlier releases. Brian Leak of the Alternative Press noted that the track "follows suit with a slightly new direction for BMTH with plenty of melody and next to no screaming from Oli Sykes". Similarly, Mack of Music Feeds suggested that "the tune will no doubt divide longtime fans already dismayed by what seems to be the metalcore giant’s sudden yellow-brick quest for mainstream crossover appeal". Exclaim! writer Bradley Zorgdrager criticised the song, claiming that while "Lyrically, the album is poignant and clever ... it does occasionally falter, as on ... 'Happy Song.'"

== Commercial performance ==
"Happy Song" entered the UK Singles Chart at number 55 on 17 July 2015, whilst also topping the UK Rock & Metal Singles Chart. It remained at the top of the chart the following week, before the band's next single "Throne" took its place. The song returned to the UK Singles Chart on 18 September at number 66, following the release of That's the Spirit. In the United States, the track reached number three on the Billboard Mainstream Rock chart and number 19 on the Hot Rock Songs chart, as well as registering on the year-end Hot Rock Songs chart at number 90. Elsewhere, it peaked at number 68 on the Australian Singles Chart.

== Track listing ==
Digital download
No.	Title	Length
1.	"Happy Song"	3:59
Total length:		3:59

7" vinyl
No.	Title	Length
1.	"Happy Song"	3:59
2.	"Happy Song" (instrumental)	3:59
Total length:		7:58

== Personnel ==
Credits adapted from Tidal.

Bring Me the Horizon

- Oliver Sykes – lead vocals, production, composition, programming
- Lee Malia – guitars, composition
- Matt Kean – bass, composition
- Matt Nicholls – drums, composition
- Jordan Fish – keyboards, synthesizers, programming, percussion, backing vocals, production, composition, engineering

Additional musicians

- Maddie Cutter – cello
- Will Harvey – violin
- Emma Fish – female backing vocals

Additional personnel

- Al Groves – engineering
- Sam Winfield – engineering
- Nikos Goudinakis – assistant engineering
- Ted Jensen – mastering
- Dan Lancaster – mixing

== Charts ==
=== Weekly charts ===
Weekly chart performance for "Happy Song"
Chart (2015–2016)	Peak position
Australia (ARIA)	68
CIS Airplay (TopHit)	193
Scottish Singles Sales (Official Charts)	35
UK Singles (Official Charts)	55
UK Rock & Metal (Official Charts)	1
US Hot Rock & Alternative Songs (Billboard)	19
US Rock & Alternative Airplay (Billboard)	18

=== Year-end charts ===
2015 year-end chart performance for "Happy Song"
Chart (2015)	Position
US Hot Rock Songs (Billboard)	90

2016 year-end chart performance for "Happy Song"
Chart (2016)	Position
US Hot Rock Songs (Billboard)	70

== Certifications ==
Certifications for "Happy Song"
Region	Certification	Certified units/sales
Australia (ARIA)	Platinum	70,000^{‡}
Brazil (Pro-Música Brasil)	Gold	30,000^{‡}
United Kingdom (BPI)	Gold	400,000^{‡}
^{‡} Sales+streaming figures based on certification alone.
