= Lark Lane, Liverpool =

Street in Liverpool, UK

Coordinates: 53.381°N 2.946°W

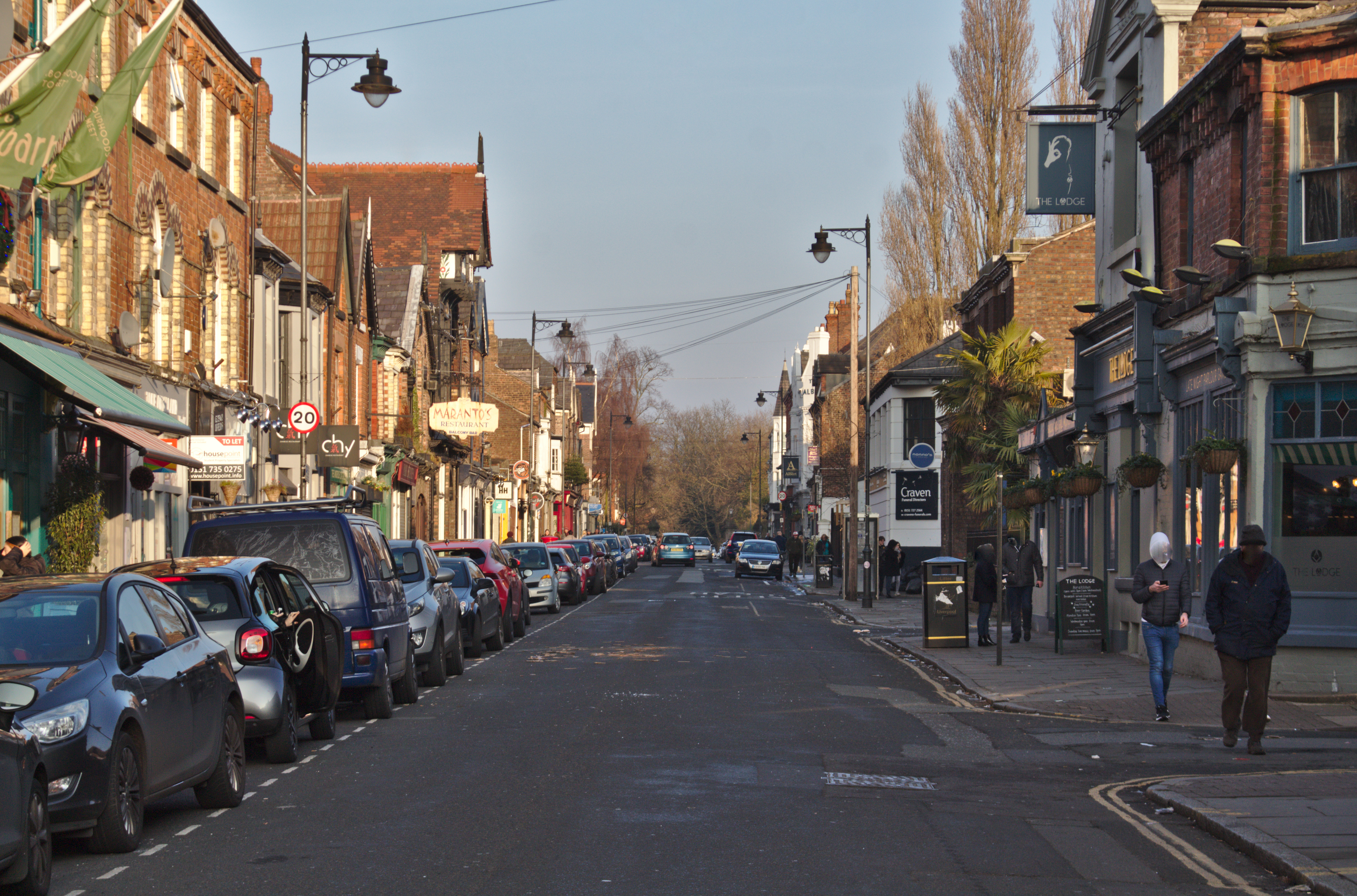
Lark Lane, January 2020

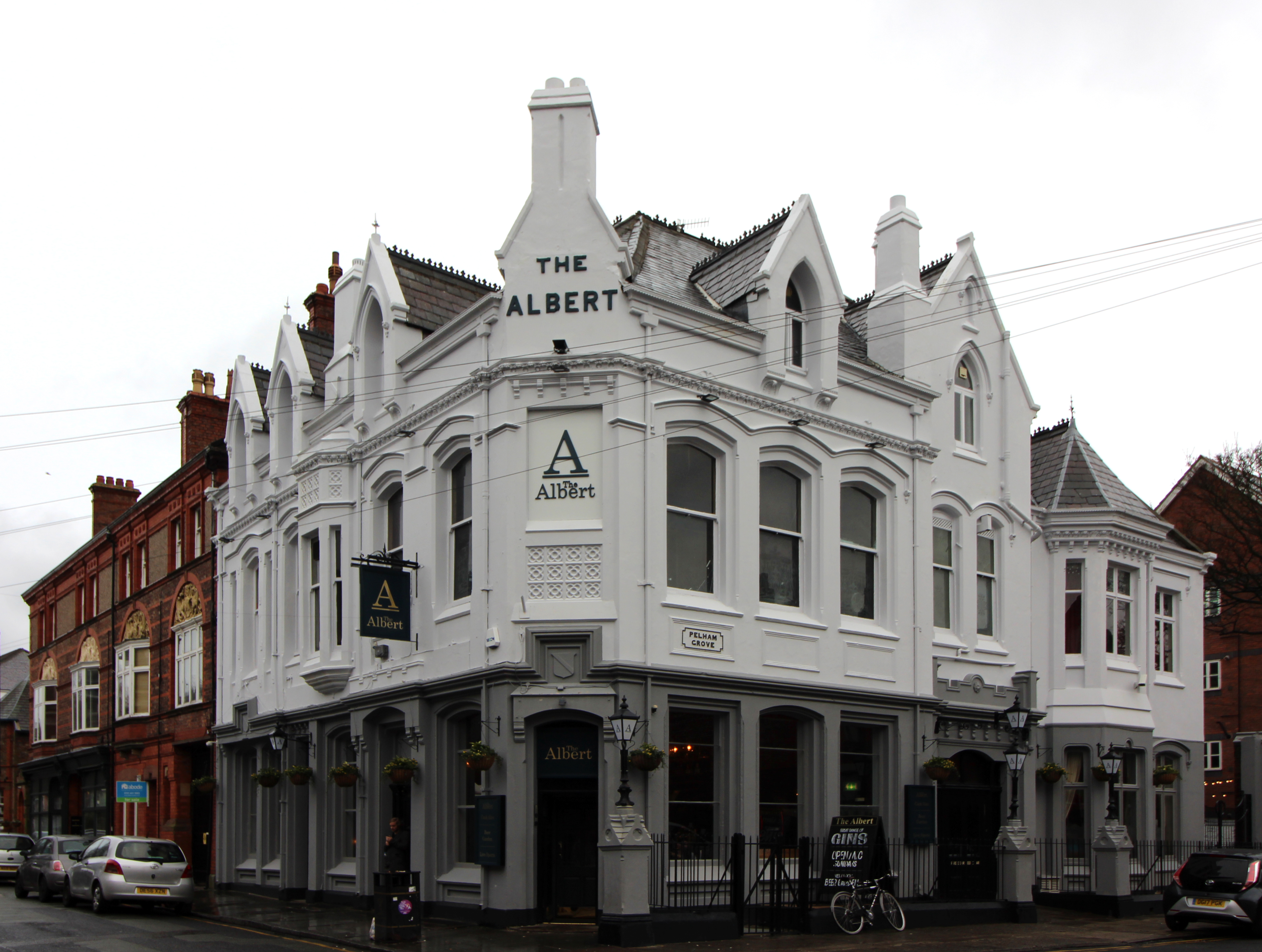
The Albert, Lark Lane 2018

Lark Lane is a street in Liverpool, England, noted for its cafés, bars, boutiques, music venues and bistros and has a bohemian reputation.

The street leads from the Victorian Sefton Park to Aigburth Road, and is situated between Sefton Park district and the Aigburth district. At the Sefton Park end, the street narrows at a pair of stone gateposts which mark the entrance to Aigburth Drive (the road around the park) and the park itself.

The street originally had a local police station, the elaborate building for which is now in use as a community centre. For a short time a nearby side road housed a motor museum, now a recording studio.

In 2017, the street's two longest running establishments, Keith's Wine Bar and The Albert Pub underwent significant renovation.

The nearest train station to Lark Lane is St Michaels, west of Aigburth Road in the former St. Michael's Hamlet.

The book, Powder, by Kevin Sampson, begins the characters' timelines for the story in Lark Lane and frequently refers to it throughout the story.

The lane has been used as a filming location for the BBC dramas This City Is Ours and The Responder.
