= Throne (song) =

2015 single by Bring Me the Horizon

Single by Bring Me the Horizon

from the album That's the Spirit
- Released: 23 July 2015
- Genre: Electronic rock; hard rock; arena rock; pop rock
- Length: 3:11
- Label: Sony; RCA
- Songwriters: Oliver Sykes; Jordan Fish; Lee Malia; Matt Kean; Matt Nicholls
- Producers: Jordan Fish; Oliver Sykes

Bring Me the Horizon singles chronology
"Happy Song" (2015)	"Throne" (2015)	"True Friends" (2015)

Music video
- "Throne" on YouTube

"Throne" is a song by British rock band Bring Me the Horizon. Produced by keyboardist Jordan Fish and vocalist Oliver Sykes, it was featured on the band's 2015 fifth studio album That's the Spirit and released as the third single from the album on 23 July 2015. The single topped the UK Rock & Metal Singles Chart and the US Billboard Mainstream Rock chart, and reached number 51 on the UK Singles Chart and number 12 on the Billboard Hot Rock Songs chart.

== Promotion and release ==
"Throne" was premiered on BBC Radio 1 on 23 July 2015 as presenter Annie Mac's "Hottest Record", before it was released as a single the same day alongside the song's music video. Shortly before the release of the album, "Throne", "Happy Song" and "Drown" were performed at Maida Vale Studios for Radio 1's Live Lounge show. In October, "Throne" and "Happy Song" were used as official theme songs for the professional wrestling show NXT TakeOver: Respect.

== Composition and lyrics ==
"Throne"
A 30 second audio clip of the first verse and chorus.

Speaking in a track-by-track commentary of That's the Spirit for Spotify, frontman Oliver Sykes explained that "Throne" was one of the first songs the band wrote for the album to be considered for release as a single, claiming that "it felt like our comeback song". Keyboardist Jordan Fish described the track as "one of the most simple and straightforward songs" on That's the Spirit, noting its natural progression from elements introduced on 2013's Sempiternal, including "an up-tempo rhythm and really strong melodies".

Describing the track as "fast, short [and] simple", Sykes has suggested that the line "So you can throw me to the wolves/Tomorrow I will come back leader of the whole pack" summarises the themes of the song, which include the proposition that "it's the people that break you that also make you". Writing for Billboard magazine, Jon Wiederhorn also highlighted this line as summarising the song's theme of "overcoming adversity". The song, influenced by nu metal, possesses "punch and warbled vocoder" and has been described as electronic rock, hard rock, arena rock and pop rock.

== Music video ==
The child who is the central focus of the music video.

The music video for "Throne" was released alongside the single on 24 July 2015, after being teased with a short trailer two days before. Directed by Sykes and Plastic Kid, it has been compared stylistically to the TV series Game of Thrones by numerous music writers. Gigwise's Andrew Trendell outlined that the video "shows scenes of medieval drama and feudal strife", while TeamRock's Chillingworth described the video as "ludicrous" and "bonkers", complaining that "it doesn't make a terrible lot of sense". In December, the band also released a video of their live performance of the song at Webster Hall in New York City earlier in the year.

== Critical reception ==
As with previous singles "Drown" and "Happy Song", some critics highlighted "Throne" as evidence of the band's change in direction from their earlier material. Writing for TeamRock, Alec Chillingworth noted that the song "split opinion all over the shop", proposing that it would be seen "as a stroke of genius by some and an abhorrent shit-stain by others" due to its electronic-influenced sound. Tom Bryant of Alternative Press described the track as "reminiscent of Linkin Park", specifically proposing that it is "a dubstep update on Meteora with Sykes in defiant Chester Bennington mode". David Renshaw for the NME also made the comparison to Linkin Park on both "Throne" and "Avalanche", which he proposed was thanks in part to the songs' "singalong choruses and driving, expansive production".

Other critics were generally positive about "Throne". Billboard writer Jon Wiederhorn described the song as "Upbeat, melodic and loud without being aggressive", proposing that it "succinctly captures the essence of the entire album". AllMusic's James Christopher Monger selected it as one of the highlights of That's the Spirit, dubbing it "as snarky as [it is] apoplectic". Similarly, DIY magazine's Sarah Jamieson claimed that "Throne ... hits tremendous new highs" for the band, while Exclaim! writer Bradley Zorgdrager also praised it as a high point of the album. Rock Sound's Andy Biddulph described "Throne" as "epic, thunderous and skyscraping in equal measure". In 2019, Billboard ranked the song number three on their list of the 10 greatest Bring Me the Horizon songs, and in 2022, Kerrang! ranked the song number two on their list of the 20 greatest Bring Me the Horizon songs.

== Commercial performance ==
"Throne" entered the UK Singles Chart at number 51 on 31 July 2015, whilst also topping the UK Rock & Metal Singles Chart. It remained at the top of the chart for 12 consecutive weeks, before Fall Out Boy's single "Irresistible" took its place. The song returned to the UK Singles Chart on 3 September and remained in the top 100 for another seven weeks, while it once again topped the rock chart on 6 November. In the United States, the track became the band's first release to top the Billboard Mainstream Rock chart, while it also reached number 12 on the Hot Rock Songs chart and number 37 on the Alternative Songs chart. The track later registered on the year-end Mainstream Rock chart at number 34 and the year-end Hot Rock Songs chart at number 54. Elsewhere, it peaked at number 58 on the Australian Singles Chart. and at number 29 on the Belgian Ultratip chart in the Flanders region. As of March 2025, the song had been certified platinum by the BPI in the UK for sales of 600,000 units.

== Track listing ==
Digital download
No.	Title	Length
1.	"Throne"	3:11
Total length:		3:11

Promo CD single
No.	Title	Length
1.	"Throne"	3:11
2.	"Throne" (instrumental)	3:11
Total length:		6:22

== Personnel ==
Credits adapted from Tidal.

Bring Me the Horizon

- Oliver Sykes – lead vocals, production, composition, programming
- Lee Malia – guitars, composition
- Matt Kean – bass, composition
- Matt Nicholls – drums, composition
- Jordan Fish – keyboards, synthesizers, programming, percussion, backing vocals, production, composition, engineering

Additional musicians

- Maddie Cutter – cello
- Will Harvey – violin

Additional personnel

- Al Groves – engineering
- Sam Winfield – engineering
- Nikos Goudinakis – assistant engineering
- Ted Jensen – mastering
- Dan Lancaster – mixing

== In popular culture ==
- In 2015, the song was used in the third episode of the seventh season of The Vampire Diaries.
- In 2016, the song was used in the first episode of the twenty-third season of Top Gear.
- In 2018, Match of the Day used "Throne" in the opening Premier League montage of 31 March episode of the 2017–18 Premier League season.
- In 2026, a cinematic remix of the song was included in the video game Ghost of Yōtei.

== Charts ==
=== Weekly charts ===
Weekly chart performance for "Throne"
Chart (2015–2016)	Peak position
Australia (ARIA)	58
Belgium (Ultratop 50 Flanders)	29
Canada Rock (Billboard)	40
CIS Airplay (TopHit)	200
Scottish Singles Sales (Official Charts)	39
UK Singles (Official Charts)	51
UK Rock & Metal (Official Charts)	1
US Hot Rock & Alternative Songs (Billboard)	12
US Rock & Alternative Airplay (Billboard)	14

=== Year-end charts ===
2015 year-end chart performance for "Throne"
Chart (2015)	Position
US Hot Rock Songs (Billboard)	54

2016 year-end chart performance for "Throne"
Chart (2016)	Position
US Hot Rock Songs (Billboard)	95

== Certifications ==
Certifications for "Throne"
Region	Certification	Certified units/sales
Australia (ARIA)	2× Platinum	140,000^{‡}
Brazil (Pro-Música Brasil)	Platinum	60,000^{‡}
Canada (Music Canada)	Gold	40,000^{‡}
Denmark (IFPI Danmark)	Gold	45,000^{‡}
Germany (BVMI)	Gold	200,000^{‡}
New Zealand (RMNZ)	Platinum	30,000^{‡}
Poland (ZPAV)	Gold	25,000^{‡}
United Kingdom (BPI)	Platinum	600,000^{‡}
Streaming
Sweden (GLF)	Gold	4,000,000^{†}
^{‡} Sales+streaming figures based on certification alone.^{†} Streaming-only figures based on certification alone.
