= Don't Look Down (Bring Me the Horizon song) =

Song by Bring Me the Horizon featuring Orifice Vulgatron
- Released: 29 October 2014
- Genre: Post-hardcore; drum and bass; hip hop; dubstep
- Length: 3:56
- Songwriter(s): Jordan Fish; Lee Malia; Oliver Sykes
- Producer(s): Jordan Fish; Oliver Sykes

"Don't Look Down" is a song by British rock band Bring Me the Horizon that features guest vocals from Foreign Beggars' Orifice Vulgatron. The song premiered on 29 October 2014 during a BBC Radio 1 broadcast and the following day was shown in Zane Lowe's re-score of the movie Drive. "Don't Look Down" is a stand-alone song to promote the film.

== Composition ==
"Don't Look Down" has been described as a post-hardcore, drum and bass, rap and dubstep song.

== Critical reception ==
Many fans were unhappy with the track due to the inclusion of hip hop and dubstep music, which diverged from the band's previous influences. Within a day of the song's release, the band issued a statement regarding the controversy on Twitter.

It was included in a list of the band's most underrated songs published in Alternative Press in March 2023, with journalist Chris Payne writing that Orifice Vulgatron's lyrics gave the song "a skittering, electronic underbelly beneath the band's usual screaming and crushing guitars."
