= Blackmill (musician) =

Scottish musician

- Birth name: Robert Card
- Origin: Carrbridge, Scotland
- Genres: Dubstep, trance
- Occupation: Music producer

Robert Card, known professionally as Blackmill, is a Scottish electronic music producer. His music has been described as being melodic dubstep and chillstep.

Card was born in the Scottish Highlands and started playing a guitar which he got for his birthday at age 8. At the age of 15, he began producing trance music under the name Robert J.C. He started producing dubstep as a response to its growth in 2010.

His remix of Ellie Goulding's "Your Song" placed number one on the music blog aggregator Hype Machine in the early 2010s. During 2011, he released his debut album Reach for Glory, as well as another album, titled Miracle. In 2017, he worked with Scottish folk singer John Edge to release the song "Emerald City". In 2021, he released Home, his comeback album.

In 2019, Bella Bagshaw of Dancing Astronaut described him as an "eternally under-the-radar producer".

== Discography ==
- Reach for Glory (2011)
- Miracle (2011)
- Home (2021)
