= Chillstep =

Subgenre of dubstep music

- Stylistic origins: Dubstep; chillout; ambient
- Cultural origins: Late 2000s, United Kingdom
- Derivative forms: Chillwave; future garage

Fusion genres
- Chillwave

Other topics
- Electronic music

Chillstep is a subgenre of dubstep with a softer, melodic, and atmospheric sound, combined with the heavy bass and rhythms of traditional dubstep. It combines elements of ambient music, chillout, and downtempo electronic styles, mostly featuring ethereal vocals and relaxed tempos, typically around 120–140 beats per minute. Chillstep emerged in the late 2000s, primarily in the United Kingdom, as producers sought to create a more soothing alternative to the aggressive, heavy sound of mainstream dubstep.

== Characteristics ==
Chillstep music is characterized by soft, melodic basslines, slow rhythms, and atmospheric textures. Unlike dubstep, which often relies on heavy wobble bass and drops, chillstep focuses on mood, ambience, and emotional resonance. Vocals, when present, are usually airy and echoing. The genre often incorporates piano and strings.

== History ==
Chillstep began in the late 2000s, alongside the rise of the broader dubstep movement. Online platforms such as YouTube and SoundCloud helped artists share their music with global audiences. Early chillstep artists included names such as Blackmill, SizzleBird, and MitiS, who blended electronic production techniques with emotive melodies.

== Notable chillstep artists ==
Some of the most widely recognized chillstep artists and producers include:

- Blackmill
- Phaeleh
- Seven Lions
- Jai Wolf
- Adventure Club
