= Drown (Bring Me the Horizon song) =

Single by Bring Me the Horizon

from the album That's the Spirit
- Released: 21 October 2014
- Genre: Pop-punk; emo; alternative rock; arena rock
- Length: 3:41
- Label: Epitaph; Sony; RCA; Columbia
- Songwriters: Oliver Sykes; Jordan Fish; Lee Malia; Matt Kean; Matt Nicholls
- Producers: Jordan Fish; Oliver Sykes

Bring Me the Horizon singles chronology
"Can You Feel My Heart" (2013)	"Drown" (2014)	"Happy Song" (2015)

Audio sample
- file; help

Music video
- "Drown" on YouTube

"Drown" is a song by British rock band Bring Me the Horizon released on 21 October 2014. Originally released as a stand-alone single, a remixed version features on the band's fifth studio album That's the Spirit and was released as the lead single. The track, musically, marks a shift away from the band's previously established metalcore sound. Rather, it was described by critics as a pop-punk-leaning emo and rock song, with the latter showcased as alternative rock and arena rock.

It reached No. 17 in the UK, becoming the band's first top-20 single in their home country.

== Promotion and release ==
The song was announced 13 October 2014 on the band's social media accounts. The song leaked on 21 October 2014 on YouTube by accident because of a mistake by Epitaph Records, the band's United States record label. It later premiered officially on BBC Radio 1 that same day. After it aired on BBC Radio 1, Oliver Sykes was interviewed by Zane Lowe. It had been reported that "Drown" would not appear on any studio album from the band. However, the song was later announced to be track 9 on the 2015 album That's the Spirit, albeit as a remixed version.

"Drown" was set to be released on iTunes on 7 December 2014. However, in early October, Oliver Sykes began teasing lyrics in the form of photos on Twitter. He also posted a message stating if "#DROWN" started trending on Twitter, they would release the song sooner. Drown was released on iTunes 3 November 2014. "Drown" was issued as a picture disc in the UK on 7 December. It was nominated for the Kerrang! Award for Best Single.

Later on 8 September 2015, the band performed an acoustic version of "Drown" which was alongside "Happy Song" and "Throne" part of a radio session set at Maida Vale Studios for BBC Radio 1 with Annie Mac. Furthermore, it was accompanied by a small group of violinists. On 25 December 2015, the band released the BBC Radio 1 acoustic performance of "Drown" as a standalone single.

== Music video ==
The music video for the track was released on 21 October 2014 via their Vevo account. It features the band performing the track "rather rigidly", being described as "a far cry from their energetic live shows." During the video Oli Sykes eyes turn green and reptilian, Matt Kean's hand fades away briefly and Matt Nichols turns into a werewolf and attacks Jordan Fish.

== Personnel ==
Credits adapted from Tidal.

Bring Me the Horizon

- Oliver Sykes – lead vocals, production, composition, programming
- Lee Malia – guitars, composition
- Matt Kean – bass, composition
- Matt Nicholls – drums, composition
- Jordan Fish – keyboards, synthesizers, programming, percussion, backing vocals, production, composition, engineering

Additional personnel

- Al Groves – engineering
- Sam Winfield – engineering
- Nikos Goudinakis – assistant engineering
- Ted Jensen – mastering
- Dan Lancaster – mixing

== Charts ==
=== Weekly charts ===
Weekly chart performance for "Drown"
Chart (2014–2015)	Peak position
Australia (ARIA)	27
Austria (Ö3 Austria Top 40)	63
Belgium (Ultratop 50 Flanders)	30
Finland Download (Suomen virallinen lista)	23
Germany (GfK)	90
Germany Rock Airplay (Official German Charts)	1
Hungary (Single Top 40)	38
Scottish Singles Sales (Official Charts)	11
UK Singles (Official Charts)	17
UK Rock & Metal (Official Charts)	1
US Bubbling Under Hot 100 (Billboard)	9
US Hot Rock & Alternative Songs (Billboard)	11
US Rock & Alternative Airplay (Billboard)	29

=== Year-end charts ===
Year-end chart performance for "Drown"
Chart (2015)	Position
US Hot Rock Songs (Billboard)	64

== Certifications ==
Certifications for "Drown"
Region	Certification	Certified units/sales
Australia (ARIA)	Platinum	70,000^{‡}
Brazil (Pro-Música Brasil)	Gold	30,000^{‡}
United Kingdom (BPI)	Gold	400,000^{‡}
^{‡} Sales+streaming figures based on certification alone.
