= Al Groves =

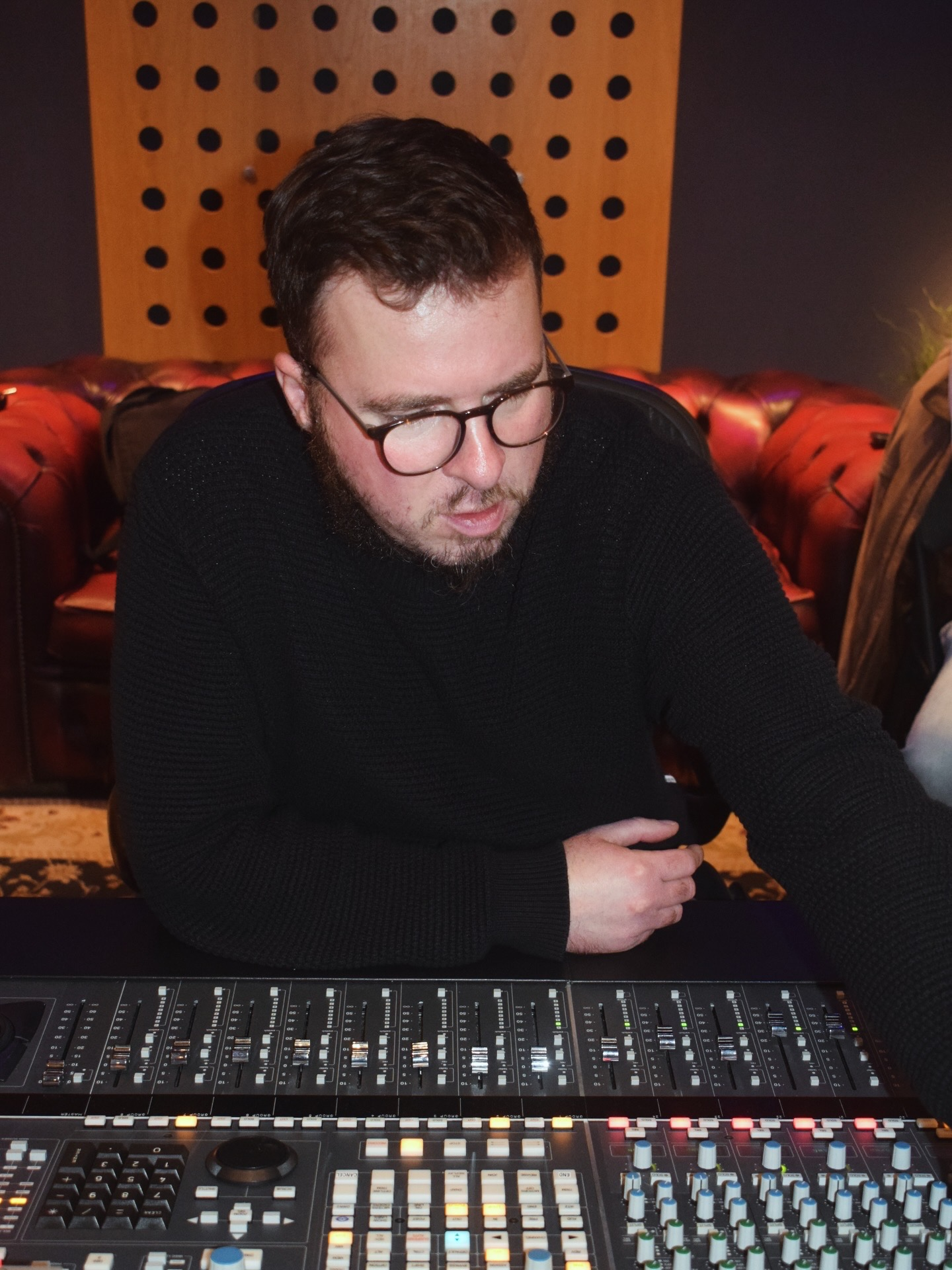
Al Groves in the Motor Museum recording studio in Liverpool, England.

Alistair Austin Rothwell Groves is a British record producer and mixer, based in Liverpool, England. Renowned for his expertise in producing guitar based rock and alternative music, Al Groves has achieved platinum, gold and silver records throughout his career, most notably his work on "That's The Spirit" by Bring Me The Horizon. Groves is also the owner of the Motor Museum, a legendary state of the art recording studio with deep historical roots in the Liverpool Music Scene.

== Early life ==
After finding more pleasure being privy to schoolmates’ closed-door songwriting sessions and band practices than fronting a band himself, 15 year old Al Groves found himself obsessed with sonics and sound. It wasn't until watching the special features of an Iron Maiden documentary he was gifted as a teenager that Groves was exposed to the quantity of behind-the-scenes roles available in the music industry, most notably the existence of music producer Kevin Shirley, who immediately inspired Al Groves to harbour a fascination in music production.

Groves moved to Liverpool in 2004 for a Software Engineering degree when he realised his passion for music was paramount, and left Liverpool John Moores University with the drive to become a producer. During this time, he met Mark Bartley who introduced him to the heart of the Liverpool music scene. Mutual connections formed, leading to a chance visit to the Liverpool Institute for Performing Arts. Within the first minutes of stepping into their largest recording studio, Al's path was set.

In his early years in Liverpool, Al Groves house-shared a property on Parkfield Road, secretly turning the basement into a full DIY home recording studio with control room while his housemates were away over the Summer. Each room acted as a live room, with his own bedroom acting as the control room. Groves engineered and produced local up-coming bands for free to learn and hone his craft. Looking for an income, Groves contacted local recording studios, including the Motor Museum on Hesketh St (that Groves now owns), but was turned away due to lack of formal training. This triggered a surge in determination for Groves.

It was at this time Al Groves shared his dream of professional record production with his friend, Mark Bartley, who was interested in the prospect of owning a local rehearsal space. Groves bartered with Bartley, offering to run the rehearsal space unpaid in exchange for a rent-free studio space. Bartley agreed.

After visiting another established recording studio, Bartley suggested a partnership with Groves on a full recording studio, which became SandHills Studio, Vauxhall.

== Career ==
Through Sandhills, Groves built a reputation as an engineer, whilst developing his ideas in production. He worked with a growing clientele at Sandhills, from small, independent artists to Miles Kane, Elvis Costello and Claire Sweeney.

Groves left Sandhills in 2012 to take over the lease for the Motor Museum recording studio.

In early 2015, Groves traveled to Santorini, Greece to engineer Bring Me the Horizon's fifth studio album That's the Spirit, having worked with the band on the first single for the album ("Drown") at the Motor Museum the previous year.

Al Groves went on to work with artists such as KoKoMo, Paris Youth Foundation and Jalen Ngonda.

In 2021, Groves purchased the Motor Museum recording studio from OMD frontman Andy McCluskey. He proceeded to revamp the studio, bringing in new monitors, acoustic treatment and outboard. Most notably, Groves purchased a Solid State Logic Duality console from Pete Townshend of The Who. The desk has an iconic history, being used to record and mix the likes of The Who, Adele, Billy Idol, Lou Reed, The Flaming Lips, The Raconteurs, The Kooks, Dinosaur Jr, Seasick Steve and Tenacious D.

Al Groves now primarily works from the Motor Museum recording studio. His client list includes Bring Me The Horizon, The Sherlocks, STONE, Crawlers, Cast, Blanket, The Reytons, Jalen Ngonda and KoKoMo.

Groves states on his website:

“Forged through twenty years of record making and a lifelong love of music, I bring my passion and creativity to every project—whether it’s a mix, a full production, or a co-write. My production style celebrates imagination, emotion, and individuality. I make records that sound authentic to the culture of an artist. I care deeply about the art. I believe that expression is worth more than perfection.”[4]
