= Bring Me the Horizon =

British rock band

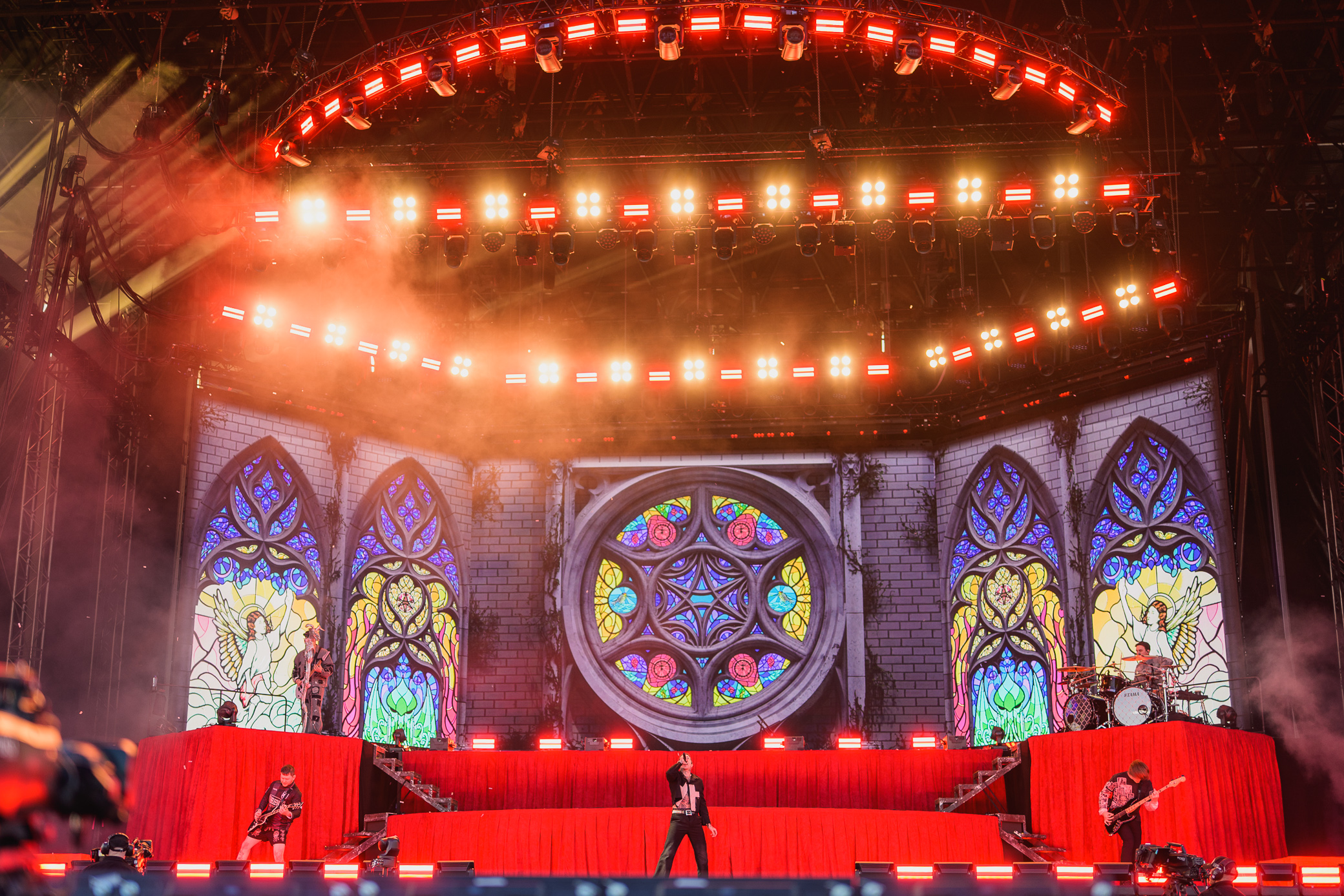
- Bring Me the Horizon performing at Tons of Rock in 2026

Background information
- Origin: Sheffield, South Yorkshire, England
- Genres: Metalcore; alternative metal; post-hardcore; pop rock; electronic rock; deathcore (early)
- Works: Discography; songs
- Years active: 2004–present
- Labels: BMG; Sony; RCA; Columbia; Visible Noise; Epitaph; Thirty Days of Night; Earache; Shock
- Members: Oli Sykes; Lee Malia; Matt Kean; Matt Nicholls
- Past members: Curtis Ward; Jona Weinhofen; Jordan Fish
- Website: bmthofficial.com

Bring Me the Horizon are a British rock band formed in 2004 in Sheffield, England. The group currently consists of lead vocalist Oli Sykes, drummer Matt Nicholls, guitarist Lee Malia and bassist Matt Kean. They are signed to RCA Records globally and Columbia Records exclusively in the United States.

Their debut album Count Your Blessings (2006) features a deathcore sound that the band moved away from starting with their second album Suicide Season (2008), which incorporates metalcore. The album was considered a creative, critical and commercial turning point for the band. The band's third album, There Is a Hell Believe Me I've Seen It. There Is a Heaven Let's Keep It a Secret. (2010), propelled them to greater international fame, retained their metalcore sound whilst fusing influences from classical music, electronica and pop. Their major label debut, Sempiternal (2013), achieved Gold certification in Australia (35,000) and Silver in the United Kingdom (60,000). That's the Spirit (2015) debuted at number two in the UK Albums Chart and the US Billboard 200.

Bring Me the Horizon's sixth studio album, Amo (2019), became their first UK chart-topper. That year, they also released Music to Listen To... (2019). Post Human: Survival Horror followed in 2020, the first in a planned series of four projects under the Post Human name, with the second installment, Post Human: Nex Gen, released as their seventh studio album in May 2024. The band have also released two extended plays and three live albums.

They have received seven Kerrang! Awards, including two for Best British Band and one for Best Live Band, a BRIT Award for Best Rock/Alternative Act, and two Grammy Award nominations. The band has sold over five million records worldwide, and have topped the UK Rock & Metal Singles Chart with songs such as "Throne", "Drown", "Mantra", "Parasite Eve", "Teardrops", and "Kool-Aid". The style of their early work has been described primarily as deathcore, but over the course of several albums, the band has shifted its style to a more melodically-orientated direction, combining their approach to metalcore and alternative metal with elements of electronica and pop.

== History ==
=== Formation and early releases (2002–2006) ===
Bring Me the Horizon's founding members came from diverse musical backgrounds within metal and rock. Matt Nicholls and Oliver Sykes had a common interest in American metalcore such as Norma Jean and Skycamefalling, and used to attend local hardcore punk shows. They later met Lee Malia, who spoke with them about thrash metal and melodic death metal bands like Metallica and At the Gates; Malia had also been part of a Metallica tribute band before meeting the pair. Bring Me the Horizon officially formed in March 2004, when the members were aged 15 to 17. Curtis Ward, who also lived in the Rotherham area, joined Sykes, Nicholls and Malia on drums. Bassist Matt Kean, who was in other local bands, completed the line-up. Their name is taken from a line of dialogue spoken by Captain Jack Sparrow in the 2003 film Pirates of the Caribbean: The Curse of the Black Pearl, in which Sparrow says: "Now, bring me that horizon."

In the months following their formation, Bring Me the Horizon created a demo album titled Bedroom Sessions. They followed this by releasing their first EP, This Is What the Edge of Your Seat Was Made For, in September 2004 through local UK label Thirty Days of Night Records. Bring Me the Horizon were the label's first signing. It was recorded at Pristine Studios in Nottingham over the course of two weekends, with drums and bass laid down over the first weekend, and guitars and vocals completed a week later.

UK label Visible Noise noticed the band after the release of their EP, and signed them for a four-album deal, in addition to re-releasing the EP in January 2005. The re-release gained the band significant attention, eventually peaking at No. 41 on the UK album charts. The band was later awarded Best British Newcomer at the 2006 Kerrang! Awards ceremony.

The band's first tour was supporting The Red Chord across the United Kingdom. Kean and Oliver's mother Carol Sykes were the de facto managers of the band at this time, a role they continued to occupy until 2008. For The Red Chord support, Kean emailed promoters and pretended they were opening on all the dates, when they were supposed to play only one date scheduled as a local opener. This led them to being booked for the whole tour. In another case, Sykes created an e-mail account in the name of Johnny Truant vocalist Oliver Mitchell, which he used to contact a promoter requesting Bring Me the Horizon on their tour. Alcohol consumption fuelled their live performances in their early history when the band would get so drunk they vomited on stage and damaged their equipment.

=== Count Your Blessings (2006–2007) ===
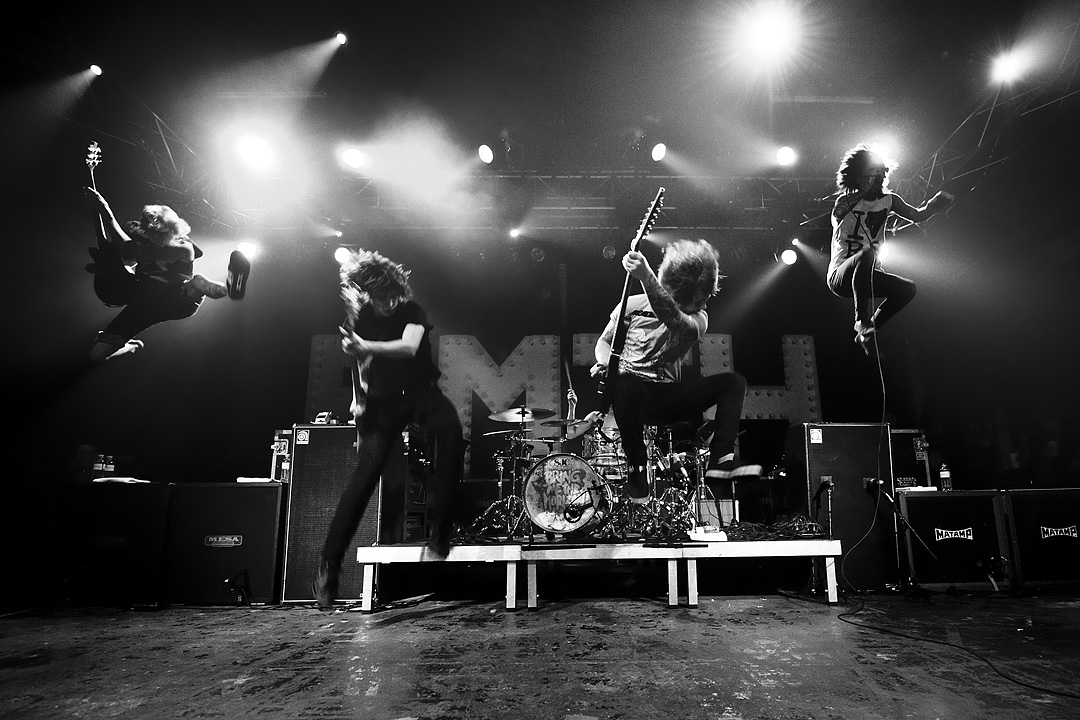
Bring Me the Horizon in Vienna

The band released their debut album Count Your Blessings in October 2006 in the United Kingdom and in August 2007 in the United States. They rented a house in the country to write songs, but easily became distracted. They then recorded the album in inner-city Birmingham, a process which was infamous for their excessive and dangerous drinking. During this period drummer Nicholls summarised it saying "we were out every night, just being regular 18-year-olds". Critics panned the album adding to the strongly polarised responses the band were already seeing from the public.

They supported Count Your Blessings by going on a lengthy headline tour of the UK in November, and immediately followed this joining Lostprophets and The Blackout on a UK tour through late November and December 2006.

In January 2007, Bring Me the Horizon were able to set their sights beyond the UK, when they replaced Bury Your Dead on Killswitch Engage's European headline tour. The slot became available after Bury Your Dead were forced to withdraw by the departure from the band of their vocalist, Mat Bruso. Bring Me the Horizon's presence on the tour was poorly received by fans of Killswitch Engage, with concert attendees regularly throwing bottles at the band before they even started playing their set.

=== Suicide Season and Ward's departure (2008–2009) ===
Bring Me the Horizon recorded their second studio album, Suicide Season, in Sweden with producer Fredrik Nordström. He was unimpressed with their first album and was initially absent from the recording sessions unless he needed to be there. Nordström later heard the new sound they were experimenting with during a recording session and became very involved in the record. It was promoted virally in the weeks before its release with the promotional tag line "September is Suicide Season." To promote Suicide Season the band embarked on their first headline tour of the United States, as well as appearing at the 2008 Warped Tour. In May 2008, Bring Me the Horizon was the main supporting band on I Killed the Prom Queen's farewell Australian tour with The Ghost Inside and The Red Shore.

Suicide Season was released on 18 September 2008 in the United States on Epitaph and on 29 September in Europe through Visible Noise. In 2009, Bring Me the Horizon attended the 2009 Kerrang! Tour alongside Black Tide, Dir En Grey, In Case of Fire and Mindless Self Indulgence. They also joined Thursday, Cancer Bats, Four Year Strong and Pierce the Veil on the North American leg of the 2009 Taste of Chaos tour from February to April after the tour's organizer Kevin Lyman offered them the slot. The band were initially hesitant to join this tour, but were convinced after Lyman offered them a bus and $500 of fuel for the tour.

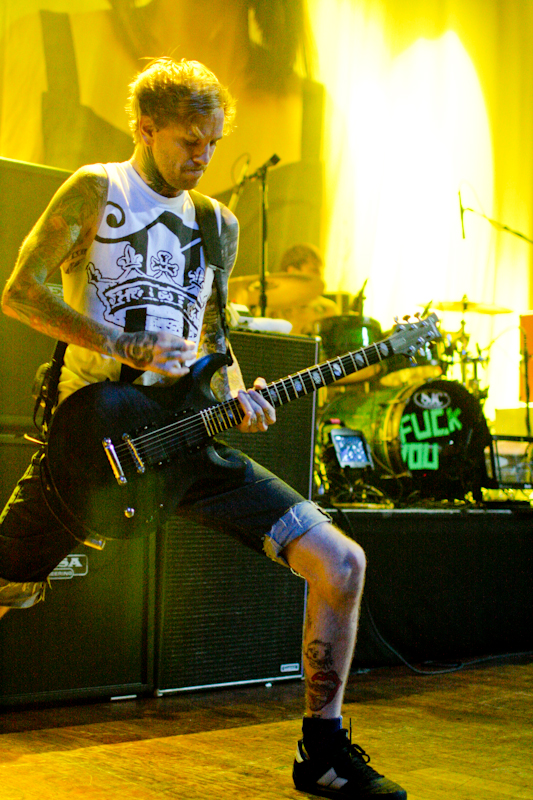
Jona Weinhofen joined the band in 2009 after leaving Bleeding Through.

During the Taste of Chaos tour in March of that year, guitarist Curtis Ward left the band. His relationship with the band had deteriorated as his stage performances were poor. He was abusive to audiences during the Taste of Chaos tour, and had contributed little to the writing of Suicide Season. Another reason for his departure was the worsening tinnitus in his one functioning ear. Ward was born deaf in one ear and admitted playing in the band worsened the ringing in his other ear to such a degree that he was unable to sleep at night. Ward offered to perform the rest of the tour dates, which the band rejected and instead asked their guitar technician, Dean Rowbotham, to substitute for him for the remaining performances. Lee Malia noted that Ward's departure helped improve everyone's mood as his attitude progressively grew very negative due to his worsening tinnitus. Within a week of the tour finishing, Sykes began talking to Jona Weinhofen, at the time the guitarist of Bleeding Through. The band knew of him from his work with his former band I Killed the Prom Queen, and he was asked to join them. Ward has since worked on the TV show Top Gear, and has occasionally performed on stage with Bring Me The Horizon, playing "Pray For Plagues", most notably at Wembley Arena in 2015. In 2016, it was announced that Ward had joined the band Counting Days.

In November 2009, Bring Me the Horizon released a remixed version of Suicide Season, titled Suicide Season: Cut Up! Musicians and producers featured on the album include: Ben Weinman, Skrillex, L'Amour La Morgue, Utah Saints and Shawn Crahan.

=== There Is a Hell... (2010–2011) ===
The band's third album, and first with their new rhythm guitarist Jona Weinhofen, titled There Is a Hell Believe Me I've Seen It. There Is a Heaven Let's Keep It a Secret., was released on 4 October 2010 and debuted at number 17 on the Billboard 200 in the United States, number 13 on the UK Album Chart, and number one on the Australian Albums Chart, the UK Rock Chart and the UK Indie Chart. Despite reaching number one in Australia, the album's sales were the lowest for a number one album in the history of the Australian Recording Industry Association (ARIA) charts.

Matt Nicholls describes the lyrical themes of There Is a Hell... as being "repercussions of everything we were singing about on our last CD [Suicide Season]," calling the music and lyrics a lot moodier and darker. Five singles were released from the album including: "It Never Ends", "Anthem", "Blessed with a Curse", "Visions", and "Alligator Blood", with music videos produced for each of the songs. The band embarked on a headline tour in intimate venues across the United Kingdom with support from Cancer Bats and Tek-One. In December 2010, Bring Me the Horizon joined Bullet for My Valentine as the main support band, alongside Atreyu, on a short five-date arena tour around the United Kingdom. To cope with high demand, Live Nation released extra standing tickets for all dates.

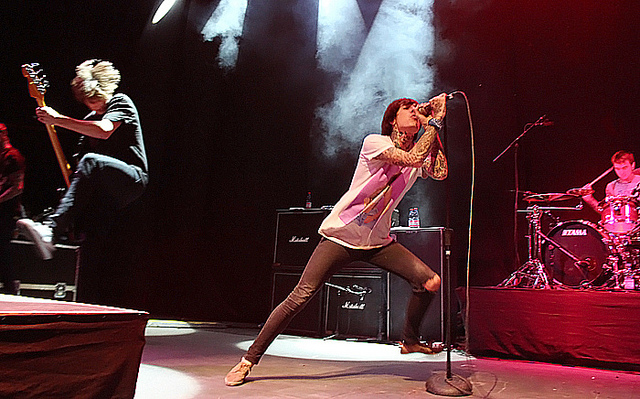
Bring Me the Horizon in 2011

In April 2011, Bring Me the Horizon embarked on a European tour, starting in the United Kingdom. They toured with Parkway Drive, Architects, and The Devil Wears Prada. On 28 April, Nicholls broke his arm whilst playing football with members of Bring Me the Horizon, Parkway Drive and Architects. Instead of cancelling the tour, Architects' drummer Dan Searle filled in as drummer, but this meant that Bring Me the Horizon's setlist was halved in length. The tour was extended with a North American leg from 13 August to 4 October, retaining Parkway Drive and Architects and adding Deez Nuts to the line up. On 23 August they released the fourth music video and single, "Visions", and on 31 October the music video for the song "Alligator Blood" was released.

In December 2011, Machine Head completed an arena tour across Europe with Bring Me the Horizon as the main support band along with DevilDriver and Darkest Hour. Oliver Sykes said these would be the last European dates before they began writing and the recording their fourth album. 2011 ended with an announcement by the band on 29 December of a new extended play titled The Chill Out Sessions, a collaborative effort with British DJ Draper. The EP was originally supposed to be released in time for New Year's Day, and made available for download and purchase though Bring Me the Horizon's website, but the EP's release was cancelled due to the band's "current management and label situation".

=== Sempiternal and Weinhofen's departure (2012–2014) ===
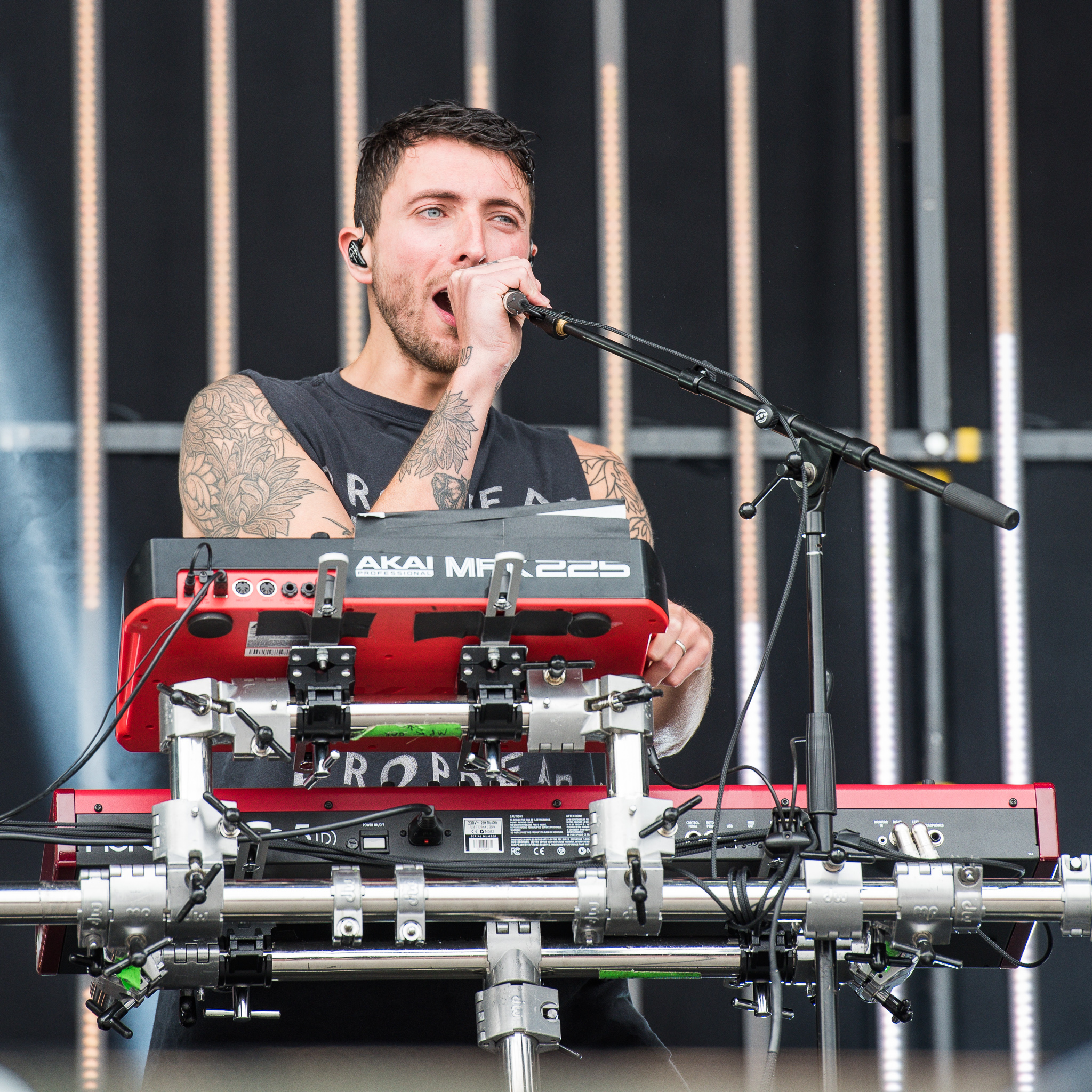
Jordan Fish joined the band in 2013, after originally being asked to contribute as a session member.

After an intense touring schedule, Bring Me the Horizon finally completed their third album's promotion at the end of 2011. They returned to the UK for an extended break and eventually starting work on their next album. Much like their previous two albums, they wrote their fourth album in seclusion and isolation to stay focused. This time, they retreated to a house in the Lake District. In July, the band started to publish images of themselves recording at a 'Top Secret Studio Location,' and revealed they were working with producer Terry Date for the recording and production of the album. On 30 July, the band announced they had left their label and signed with RCA, who would release their fourth album in 2013. The band played only three shows in all of 2012: Warped Tour 2012 on 10 November at the Alexandra Palace in London, which they headlined, (and was initially believed to be their only show), the BBC Radio 1's Radio 1 Rocks show on 22 October, where they played a six-song set supporting Bullet for My Valentine, and at a warm-up show for Warped Tour in Sheffield on 9 November. In late October it was announced that the fourth album would be called Sempiternal with a tentative release in early 2013. On 22 November the band released the Draper collaborative album The Chill Out Sessions free of charge.

On 4 January 2013, Bring Me the Horizon released the first single from Sempiternal, "Shadow Moses". It was first played by radio presenter Daniel P. Carter on BBC's Radio 1. Due to popular demand, Epitaph released the music video for the song a week earlier than planned. In January, the band also saw a change in their line-up. This began early in the month when Jordan Fish, Worship keyboardist and session musician for the band during the writing of Sempiternal, was announced as a full member. Then, later in the month, Jona Weinhofen left the band for undisclosed reasons. Despite the band denying speculation that Fish replaced Weinhofen, reviewers said that replacing a guitarist with a keyboardist better fit their style.

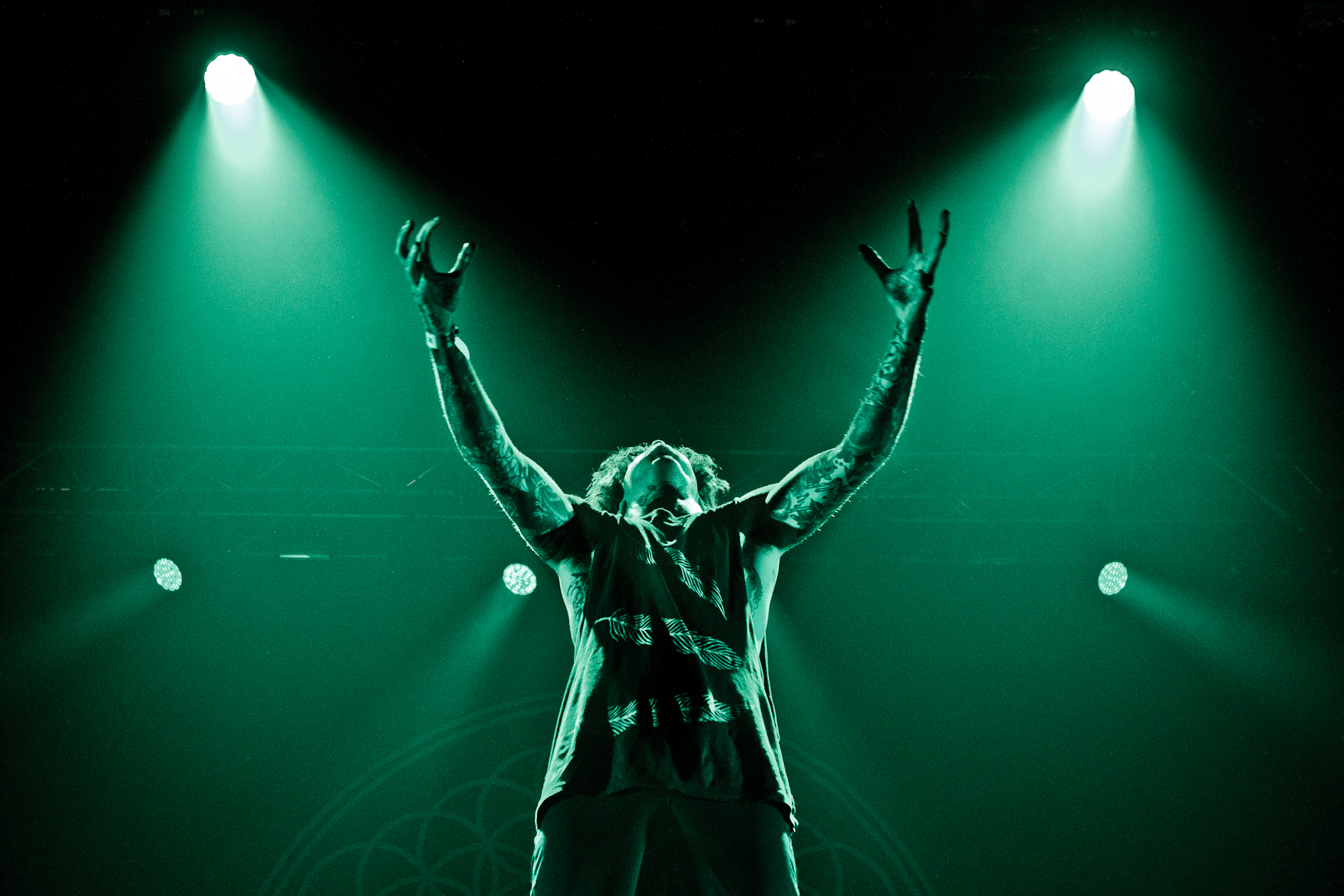
Lead vocalist Oliver Sykes at Southside Festival in Germany in 2014

The band was confirmed for several festival appearances in February. They played the Australian Soundwave festival, performing at all five dates in: Brisbane, Sydney, Melbourne, Adelaide and Perth, and then at RAMFest in South Africa with Rise Against in March, Rock Am Ring and Rock im Park festivals in Germany in June, and from June until August they played Warped Tour 2013 in the U.S. and Canada. To coincide with 29 April release of Sempiternal the band made their first headline tour of the United Kingdom in 18 months with Crossfaith and Empress AD.

In support of Sempiternal, the band toured Australia with Of Mice & Men and Crossfaith, and played a British tour with Pierce The Veil and Sights & Sounds. They then completed the American Dream Tour in North America, supported by Of Mice & Men, Issues, Letlive and Northlane. The band was announced as the main supporter for American band A Day to Remember on their "Parks & Devastation Tour" across America throughout September and October, along with support acts Motionless in White and Chiodos. The band performed at Wembley Arena in London on 5 December with support acts Young Guns, Issues and Sleepwave, which was recorded and later released as a live album/DVD. The band released "Don't Look Down", featuring Orifice Vulgatron of Foreign Beggars, on 29 October, as part of the re-score of Drive.

=== That's the Spirit (2015–2017) ===
In late June, the band began to promote pictures of an umbrella symbol being used as a tattoo, and on stickers, and posters across England, the United States, Australia, and Europe; it was later used for a promotional cover for the band's first single. The band released a short video in early July where the words "that's the spirit" could be heard in reverse. On 21 October 2014, released the single, "Drown". On 13 July 2015, the second single "Happy Song" was released, and on 21 July 2015, Sykes revealed the album's name was That's the Spirit. The band released the single and music video for "Throne" on 24 July 2015. The next single, "True Friends", was released on 24 August 2015. A music video for the single, "Follow You", was released on 16 March 2016. The music video for the next single, "Avalanche", was released on 23 June 2016. A music video for the album's final single, "Oh No", was released on 3 November 2016. That's the Spirit debuted at number two in the UK Albums Chart and the US Billboard 200.

The band embarked on a U.S. tour in October 2015 with support from Issues and PVRIS. The band also toured Europe in November 2015, and embarked on a second U.S. tour in April and May 2016. This was followed by an Australian tour in September 2016, and a second European tour in November 2016.

On 22 April 2016, the band performed a live concert with an orchestra conducted by Simon Dobson at the Royal Albert Hall in London. The concert marked the first time the band had performed with a live orchestra. It was recorded, and the live album, Live at the Royal Albert Hall, was released on 2 December 2016 through the crowdfunding platform PledgeMusic on CD, DVD, and vinyl, with all proceeds donated to Teenage Cancer Trust. Following the show, Fish hinted at the possibility of doing a full tour with an orchestra, saying: "It seems almost a bit of a shame to go to all this effort for months and months for just one night."

=== Amo (2018–2019) ===
In August 2018, cryptic posters appeared in major cities throughout the world with the message "do you wanna start a cult with me?". The posters were attributed by major media outlets to the band only by their use of the hexagram logo previously used by the band. During this time, the band themselves have not acknowledged their involvement with the campaign publicly. Each poster provided a unique phone number and a website address. The website provided a brief message titled "An Invitation To Salvation" and shows the date of 21 August 2018. The phone lines placed fans on hold with lengthy, varied audio messages that changed frequently. Some of these messages reportedly end with a distorted audio clip of what was assumed to be new music from the band.

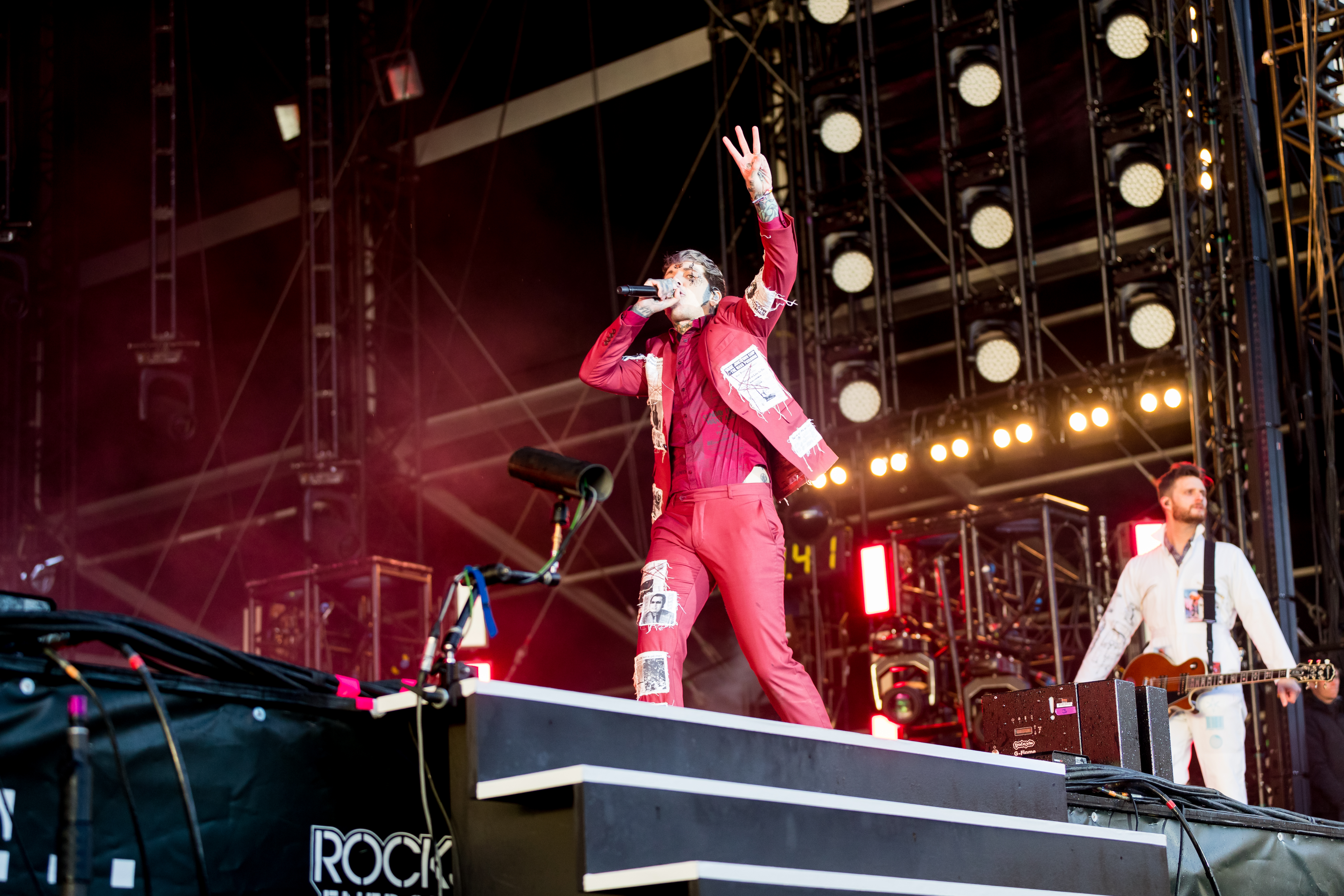
Bring Me the Horizon at Rock am Ring in 2019

On 21 August, the band released the lead single "Mantra". The following day the band announced their album Amo, with a release date of 11 January 2019, along with a set of tour dates called the First Love World Tour.

On 21 October, the band released their second single "Wonderful Life" featuring Dani Filth, along with the tracklist for Amo. That same day, the band announced that the album has been delayed 25 January 2019.

On 1 December, it was reported that during a show at London's Alexandra Palace a fan died in the mosh pit and was escorted by paramedics and security. A day later, it was confirmed by the band with a statement: "Words cannot express how horrified we are feeling this evening after hearing about the death of a young man at our show last night. Our hearts and deepest condolences go out to his family and loved ones at this terrible time. We will comment further in due course."

On 3 January 2019, the band released their third single "Medicine" and its corresponding music video. On 22 January, three days before the album release, the band released the fourth single "Mother Tongue". On 24 January, the band released the fifth single "Nihilist Blues" featuring Grimes.

On 26 July, the band released the sixth single "Sugar Honey Ice & Tea" alongside an accompanying music video. On 21 October, the band released the seventh single "In the Dark" alongside an accompanying music video featuring Forest Whitaker. On 6 November, the band released the song "Ludens", which is part of Death Stranding: Timefall, along with the news that the band are planning on never releasing an album again and instead want to release EPs. On 27 December, the band released Music to Listen To... without any prior announcement.

=== Post Human: Survival Horror (2020–2021) ===
During the COVID-19 lockdowns, the band shared that they were in a home studio, writing and recording material for their eighth record. On 25 June, the band released the single "Parasite Eve" alongside an accompanying music video. On the same day, the band also announced a project that they have been working on titled Post Human, which they said would be four EPs released throughout the next year, which when combined would make an album. The song was produced by Doom Eternal composer, Mick Gordon. On 2 September, the band released with English singer Yungblud a collaborative single titled "Obey" and its corresponding music video. On 14 October, the band officially announced through social media that Post Human: Survival Horror would be released on 30 October 2020. On 22 October, a week before the release date, the fourth single "Teardrops" was released alongside an accompanying music video.

In December 2020, Fish said that the band had been writing "on and off" and would be focusing on their next release in early 2021. He also updated the group's release plan, saying that they "planned to do four EPs in a year, but [Post Human: Survival Horror] was almost an album, so I think the spacing will be a bit longer than intended, just because they're probably going to turn out bigger than intended." Upon being released on physical formats on 22 January 2021, Post Human: Survival Horror would chart again and reach a new peak to gift Bring Me the Horizon their second UK number one on the UK Albums Chart. Two years after Amo would be the first to reach this feat. The band collaborated with singer Olivia O'Brien on a track titled "No More Friends". The song is from O'Brien's Episodes: Season 1' EP which was released on 11 June 2021.

=== Post Human: Nex Gen and Fish's departure (2021–2024) ===
On 2 September 2021, the band announced the release of an upcoming single, "Die4U", which was released on 16 September. On September 21, 2021, the band featured on a single by Tom Morello, named "Let's Get The Party Started". On 8 December, the band was announced as the Saturday co-headliner alongside Arctic Monkeys at the 2022 iteration of the Reading and Leeds Festival, headlining the bill for the first time ever.

In February 2022, it was reported that the band were set to contribute to the soundtrack and provide the main theme for Gran Turismo 7. On 4 February, the band released their rendition of "Moon Over the Castle" as a single ahead of schedule due to the song being leaked early. At the 42nd Brit Awards, the band were brought out as a surprise act to perform "Bad Habits" alongside Ed Sheeran. The studio version of "Bad Habits" featuring the band followed on 17 February. On 16 March, the band were featured on the fourth single "Maybe" from Machine Gun Kelly's Mainstream Sellout. It would become the first song by the band to reach the Billboard Hot 100, debuting at No. 91 and later peaked at No. 68. On 26 March, the band teased a collaborative single with Australian rapper Masked Wolf on their social media platforms titled "Fallout", slated for release on 1 April 2022. On 21 April, the band were featured on Norwegian singer Sigrid's single "Bad Life" from her album How to Let Go.

During Bring Me the Horizon's Malta event on 26 May, the band showcased their latest single "Strangers" for the first time at their DJ set. On 22 June, the band later officially announced the single to be released on 6 July. The single was then released alongside an accompanying music video. Bring Me the Horizon are set to headline the Australian music festival, Good Things in December. On 4 May 2023, the band released the single, "Lost". On 1 June 2023, the band released the single, "Amen!" featuring Daryl Palumbo of Glassjaw and Lil Uzi Vert. On 10 June 2023, the band announced the second Post Human installment, Post Human: Nex Gen, which was to be released on 15 September 2023. However, on 24 August, Sykes announced via a statement on his social media that the release was being delayed due to "unforeseen circumstances" which had left the band "unable to complete the record to the standard we'd be happy with". On 30 June 2023, the band released the single, "Code Mistake" in collaboration with YouTuber/rapper Corpse. The band released the single "Darkside" on 13 October 2023. On 22 December 2023, the band announced they were parting ways with keyboardist Jordan Fish. On 5 January 2024, the band released the record's sixth single, "Kool-Aid". After a delay, Post Human: Nex Gen was released on digital formats on 24 May 2024. A music video for the album's seventh single, "Top 10 Statues That Cried Blood", was released on 5 June.

=== Spotify Singles, Lo-files, and Count Your Blessings 20th Anniversary (2025–present) ===
On 29 January 2025, the band released two singles exclusively on Spotify; a cover of "Wonderwall" by Oasis, and a remix of their own song titled, "Youtopia (Earthcore Remix)". Liam Gallagher responded to the Oasis cover positively, calling it "absolutely incredible." In July 2025, the band announced they would be releasing an album titled Lo-files on 11 July 2025, consisting of lo-fi reworks of 23 songs from throughout the band's discography.

On 6 February 2026, the band were featured on the single "Slave to the Rithm", by Illenium, from his album Odyssey. The band played in the Hellfest music festival held in France in Clisson in June 2026.

On 13 April 2026, the band announced a re-recording of their debut album, Count Your Blessings, for its 20th anniversary. The band stated that the re-recording is a "reactivation" and "recontextualisation" and that they made it "sharper, heavier, and more vital than ever". On 9 June, the band teased the title of a previously secret 11th track from Count Your Blessings | Repented, "Dehumanized", while performing in Kraków, Poland. On 12 June, the band released the first song from Count Your Blessings | Repented, "Black & Blue". On 25 June, "Dehumanized" was released. The re-recording, titled Count Your Blessings | Repented, was released on 10 July 2026. The band had also played a no-barricade release show on the same day at B.E.C. Arena in Manchester, with acts such as Static Dress, Showing Teeth and Dying Wish, as well as founding guitarist Curtis Ward's new band Still in Love.

== Artistry ==
=== Musical style and influences ===
The band's musical style has been described mainly as metalcore and – though they have since moved on from the genre – their early material was considered deathcore. (Note: Musical styles: "metalcore"; "deathcore") As their sound developed, they began to take influences from progressive rock, post-rock, dubstep and electronica. According to Eli Enis of Revolver, the band "made chameleonic genre-hopping their artistic mission statement." Across their career the band has also been said to play within the genres alternative metal, alternative rock, post-hardcore, pop rock, electronic rock, hard rock, heavy metal, pop metal, pop, nu metal, electropop, emo, hip hop, EDM, arena rock, melodic metalcore, electronicore, electronica, screamo, hardcore punk, industrial metal, hyperpop, and pop-punk. (Note: Musical styles: "alternative metal"; "alternative rock"; "post-hardcore"; "pop rock"; "electronic rock"; "hard rock"; "heavy metal"; "pop metal"; "pop"; "nu metal"; "electropop"; "emo"; "hip hop"; "EDM; "arena rock"; "melodic metalcore"; "electronicore"; "electronica"; "screamo"; "hardcore punk"; "industrial metal"; "hyperpop"; "pop-punk") Additionally, Kerrang! referred to them as a "Myspace band" due to their use of the platform to gain a following early in their career. Similarly, Loudwire stated that the band has also been classified under several other "all-encompassing" labels such as "myspace-core" and "scene-core," due to the band's popularity with listeners who the publication described as "the scene kids of Myspace."

Bring Me the Horizon have attempted to change with each album, believing they should be different. Raziq Rauf, writing for Drowned in Sound, described Count Your Blessings as possessing "Norma Jean-style thunderous riffs mixed with some dastardly sludgy doom moments and more breakdowns than your dad's old Nissan Sunny." In Suicide Season, the band adopted a more eclectic style, with its "crushingly heavy party deathcore". Leading up to its release, Oliver Sykes described it as "100% different to Count Your Blessings" and "more rock than metal". Bring Me the Horizon later rejected their debut album, Count Your Blessings, and considered Suicide Season as their "Year Zero[...] [their] wipe-the-slate-clean time".

Bring Me the Horizon then moved further away from deathcore with their third album There Is a Hell..., which incorporated electronica, classical music and pop music into their metalcore style. This involved a more ambitious production, such as using a full choir, a synthesised orchestra, and glitched out vocals and breakdowns that were also toned down, favouring quiet atmospheric passages in song breaks. For the writing of Sempiternal, the band pooled far broader influences such as post-rock acts like This Will Destroy You and Explosions in the Sky and from pop music.

Bring Me the Horizon then experimented with mixing pop with metal music, leading the band to be labelled a pop metal act. With the release of That's the Spirit, their sound shifted towards alternative rock, alternative metal, electronic rock, pop rock, arena rock, and nu metal, while completely abandoning the metalcore sound of their earlier albums. The band's next album, Amo, was also described as pop rock and electronic rock, but also described as hard rock, pop metal, electropop, synth-pop, and EDM. The band's next release, Music to Listen To... moved away from rock and focused on ambient, electropop, electronica, experimental, and industrial music. Their next release, Post Human: Survival Horror, returned to the heavier sound and was described as alternative metal, metalcore, industrial metal, and electronica. The band's seventh studio album, Post Human: Nex Gen was described as post-hardcore, pop-punk, hyperpop, alternative metal, metalcore, electronica, emo, nu metal, and easycore.

Among Bring Me the Horizon's earliest influences were the bands At the Gates, Carcass, Pantera, Metallica, Zao, The Dillinger Escape Plan, Every Time I Die, Norma Jean, Skycamefalling, Slipknot and Poison the Well; as well as death metal music, such as the bands Decapitated and Suffocation. Sykes said that That's the Spirit is a loose concept album about life's darker moods, such as depression, and a way of making light of it, citing the alternative rock bands Jane's Addiction, Panic! at the Disco, Interpol and Radiohead as influences for the album. They also cited Twenty One Pilots as an influence on the band's "next phase". AllMusic writer Steward Mason cited grindcore and emo as influences on Bring Me the Horizon. Loudwire designated the band as being among modern metalcore's "Big Four", along with Underoath, Architects and Parkway Drive.

Sykes said that his vocal style on Sempiternal was influenced by Chester Bennington and cited Hybrid Theory as one of his favorite albums. The album that introduced him to metal was Alive or Just Breathing by Killswitch Engage. Jordan Fish said that the albums that influenced him most were Linkin Park's Hybrid Theory and Deftones' White Pony.

=== Songwriting and recording process ===
In all the band's album notes, all of Bring Me the Horizon's lyrics are said to be written by lead vocalist Oli Sykes while all five members—as a band—were credited with writing the music. With the exception of Count Your Blessings, the band has always written in a secluded location to avoid being distracted. Sykes' lyrics have a strong feeling of catharsis for him. He mainly draws from personal experience and has described the band's live performances as therapeutic. In 2006, when asked about the lyrics of Count Your Blessings, as they had been criticised for their content solely fixated on heartbreak and other themes that were called "shallow and meaningless", he responded "My life's never been that bad so I've not got that much to talk about." Band members have described how the debut album was written in inner-city areas of Birmingham while being pressured to write and record songs to the deadlines given. This resulted in the band being unimpressed with the final product. However, for the writing process of Suicide Season, the band realised that they preferred picking areas with less human contact to focus on the music; they wrote their second album in the Swedish countryside. During the writing of Suicide Season, former and founding rhythm guitarist Curtis Ward wrote only two riffs of his rhythm parts of the album, mostly relying on Lee Malia to write all of the guitar sections of the album.

Malia has stated that the typical writing process involves Sykes writing the main structure of the songs, followed by Malia writing the main riff. From this, they would collaborate with each other to structure their work better and then later include the rest of the band in writing the rest of the song. The writing dynamic of Sempiternal, typically featured Sykes, Malia, and newly introduced member Jordan Fish. According to Sykes, "Writing 'Sempiternal' was a completely different process...we worked from a computer, laying down ideas and riffs...bringing Jordan into the mix changed things completely; he opened up so many more possibilities." As they all took a break before writing their fourth album, they felt less of a need for an isolated writing environment.

=== Image, legacy and controversies ===
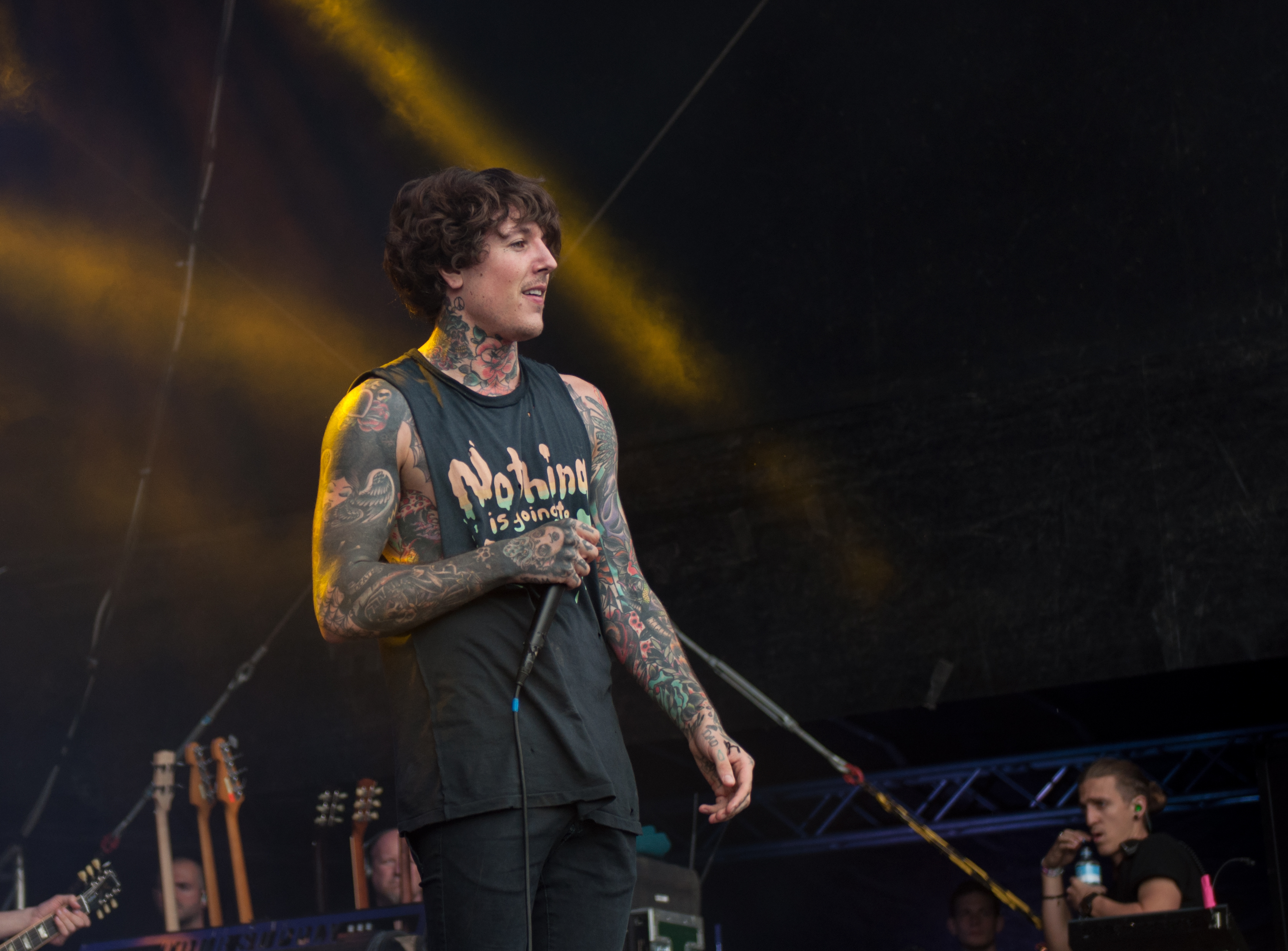
Sykes (pictured in 2014) has often been seen as the "poster boy" of Bring Me the Horizon's image.

In their early years, the band was praised for their business acumen for selling mail-order merchandise and not relying on sales at live shows, a practice which wasn't yet common at the time. Bring Me the Horizon's image has been characterised by the dominating personality of singer and front-man Oliver Sykes, and he has often been seen as the band's "Poster boy", bearing the brunt of the band's controversial reputation. Early on, Bring Me the Horizon's image was infamously characterised by its members fashion sense and use of skinny-fit jeans, sporting death metal shirts (such as Cannibal Corpse, The Faceless or Cephalic Carnage) while wearing coloured and straightened hair. The band's image fit into what was called scene fashion. The effect of their fashion aesthetics showed people, in show promoter Iain Scott's perspective, that "you don't have to look like a diabolical metalhead to be into metal or play in a metal band". However, their fashion conscious appearance earned them a "style over substance" label.

Many controversies that occurred in their early years greatly affected public perceptions of the band, particularly an incident in 2007 at Nottingham's Rock City venue, when a female fan claimed that Oliver Sykes had urinated on her. The charges were dropped due to a lack of evidence from CCTV footage in the area. There were several documented examples of violence against the band during their live shows, including Sykes being pepper sprayed on stage; and people getting onstage to assault the band.

Despite the controversy over their image, various journalists have credited the band as being one of the most forward-thinking heavy bands in the UK. In 2012, just four years after the release of Suicide Season, the album was inducted into Rock Sound's Hall of Fame, credited as a significant influence on the works of Asking Alexandria, The Ghost Inside and While She Sleeps. It was credited as an influence on metalcore contemporaries Architects on Hollow Crown with their incorporation of keyboards and programming, and The Devil Wears Prada's Dead Throne for its more experimental and opinion-dividing sound. In an interview with Kerrang!, guitarist Lee Malia remarked that the band wanted to go a bit more experimental, saying: "I always think we have been a year ahead of bands who are kind of just seeing what's cool and then copying it."

The band caused further controversy in February 2016 when Oliver Sykes trashed Coldplay's table at the 2016 NME Awards during a live performance of Bring Me the Horizon's track "Happy Song". Sykes later stated that the act was not an act of "dirty protest", and suggested that it was "pure coincidence" that Coldplay were sitting at the table he trampled. Coldplay frontman Chris Martin admitted that he had never even heard of Bring Me the Horizon before the incident and he laughed it off, stating that "it was great, very 'rock and roll'".

Another controversy occurred on April 20, 2024, when they posted a promotional ad for the Brisbane show in Australia which read, "If Jesus Christ returns, well just kill that fucker 2X," and caused some backlash among Christian fans.

On 11 May 2026, during a performance in St. Louis, Missouri, a member of the audience threw a phone at Oli Sykes, striking him on the head.

== Band members ==
Bring Me the Horizon live at Tons of Rock 2026

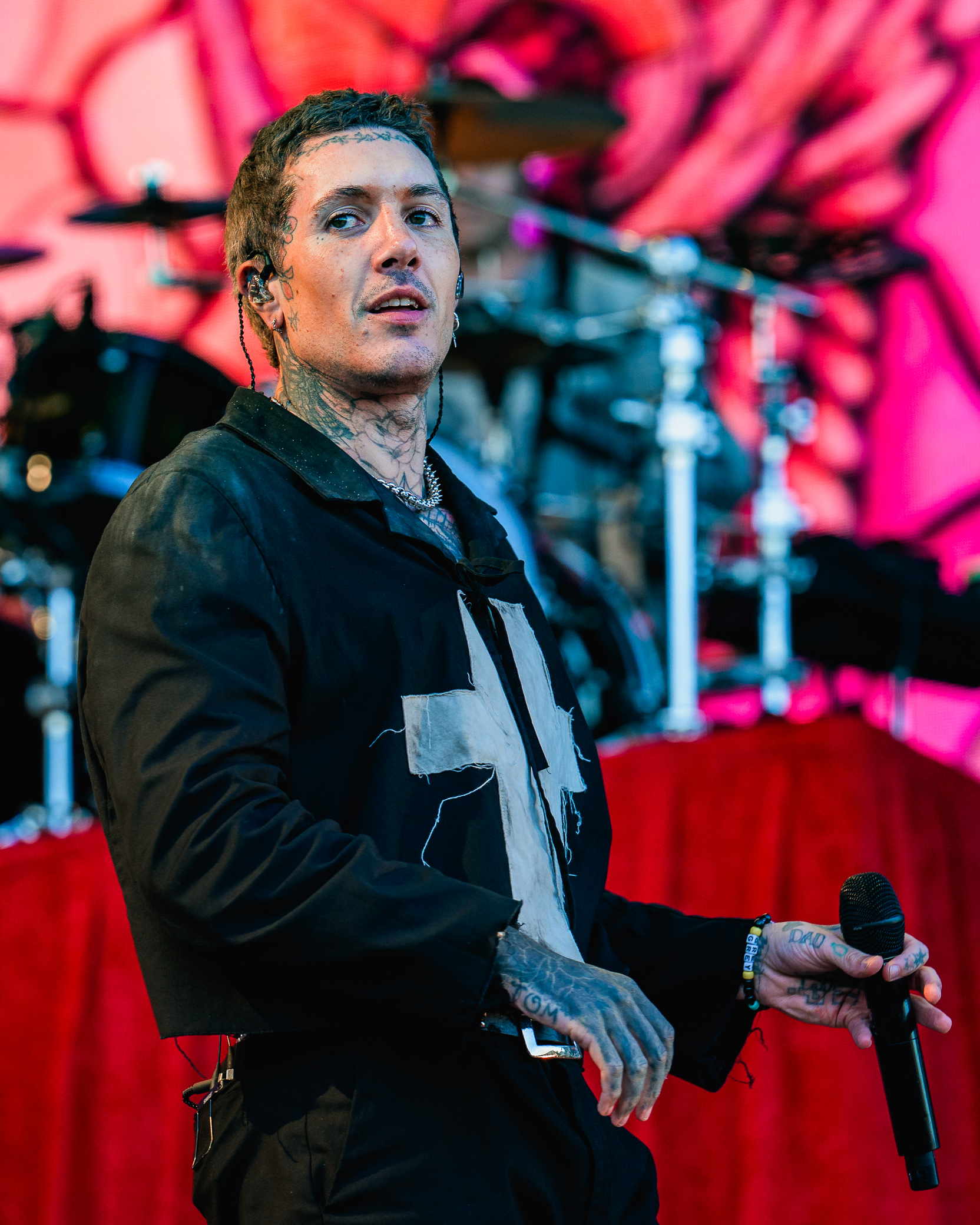
Oli Sykes

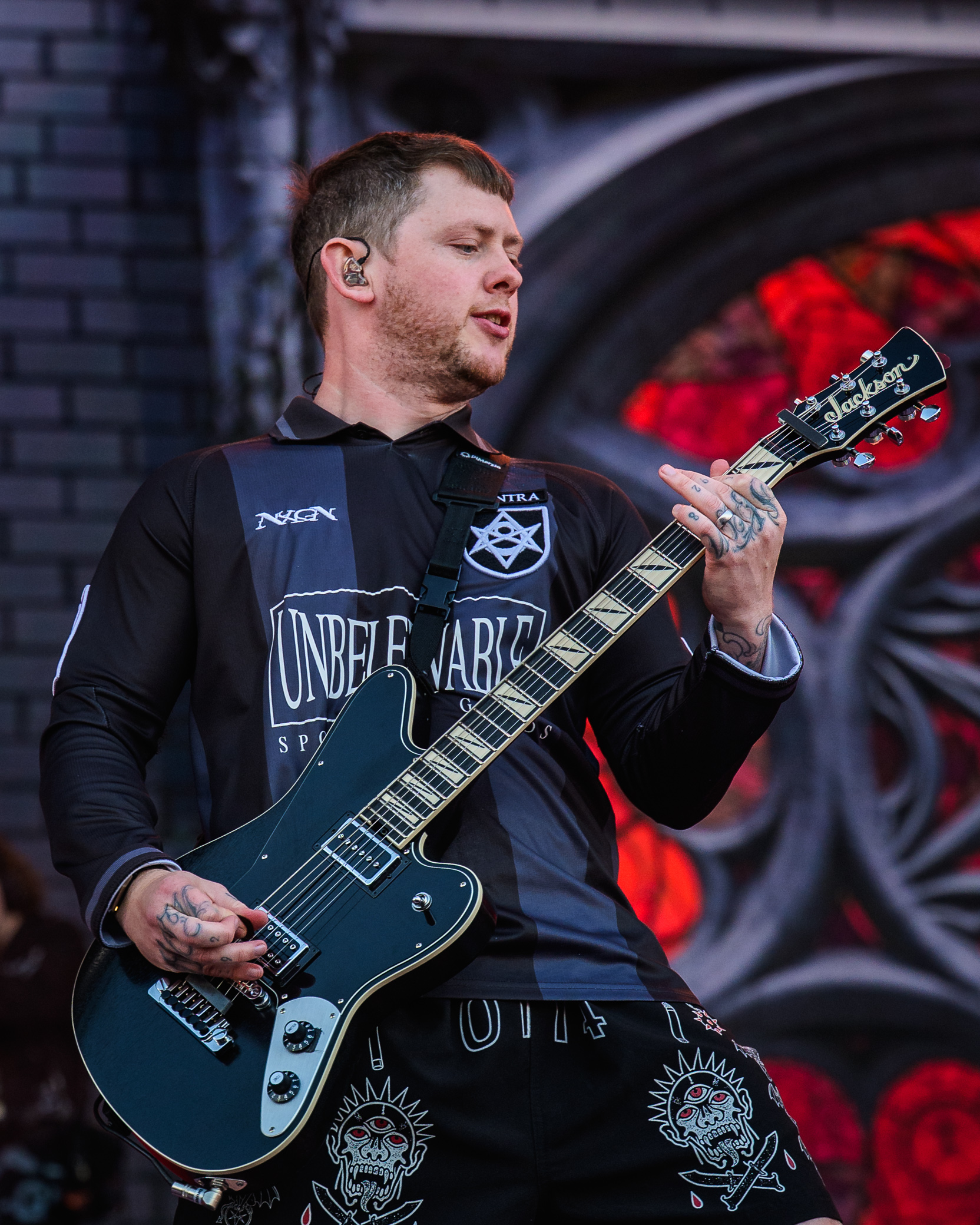
Lee Malia

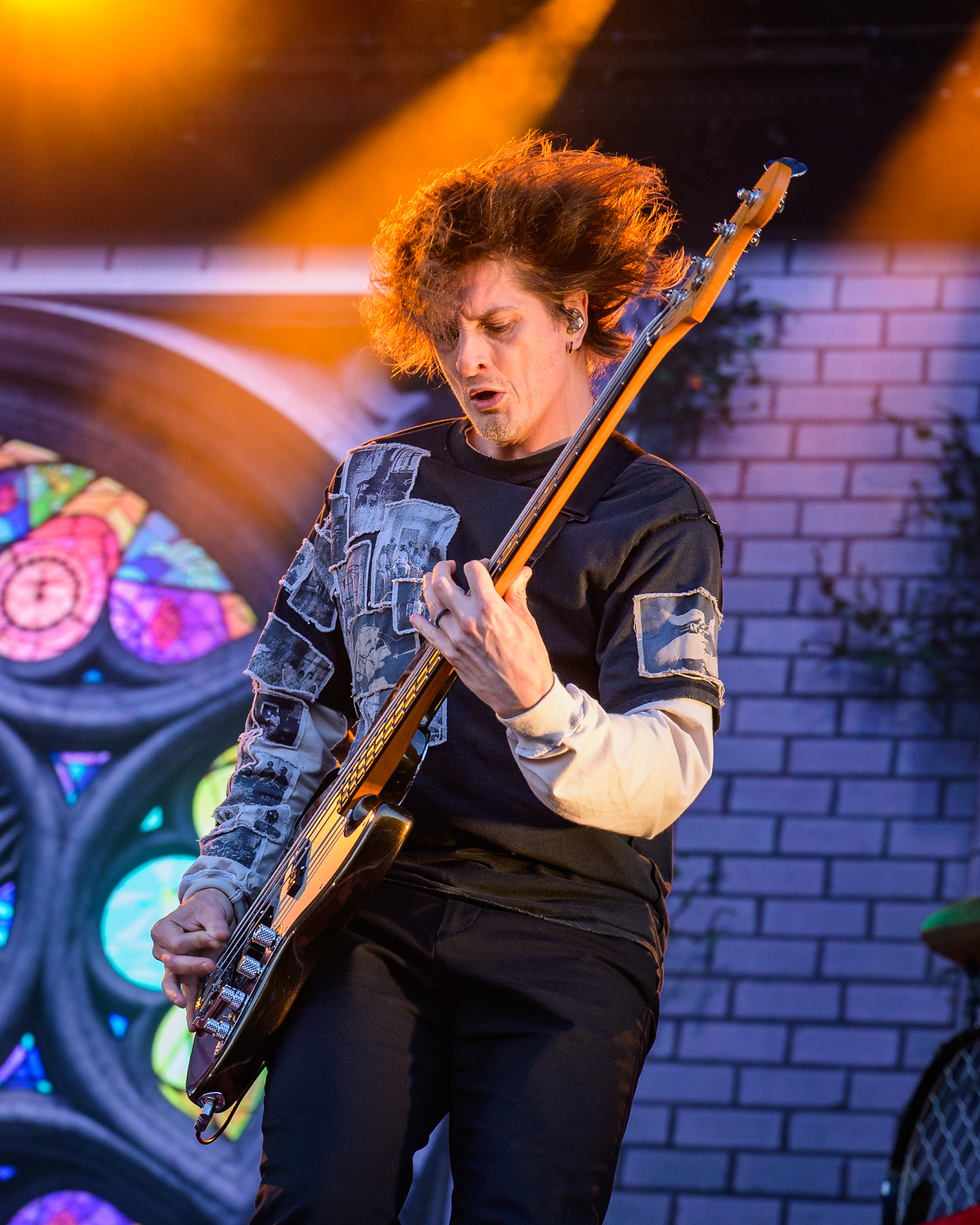
Matt Kean

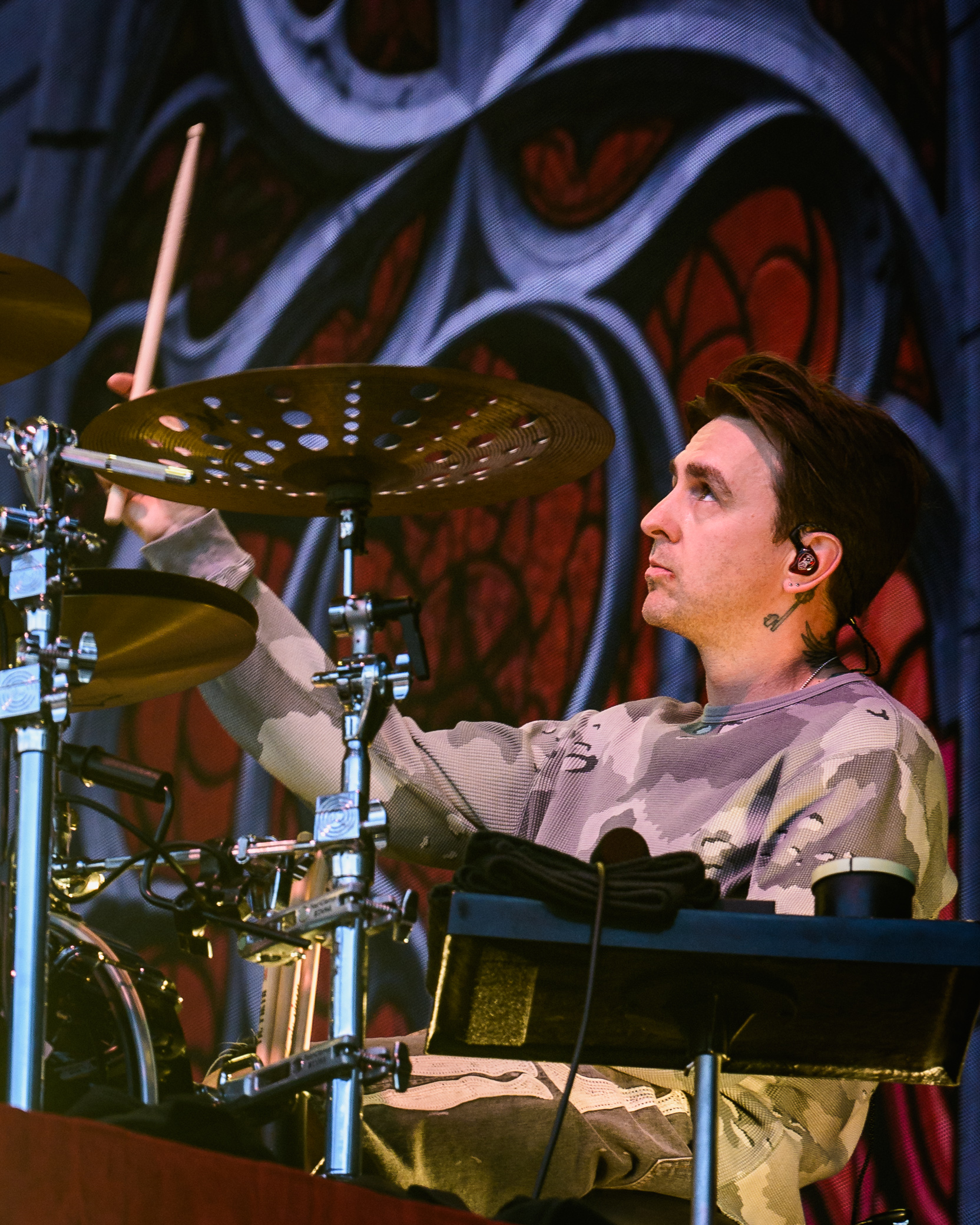
Matt Nicholls

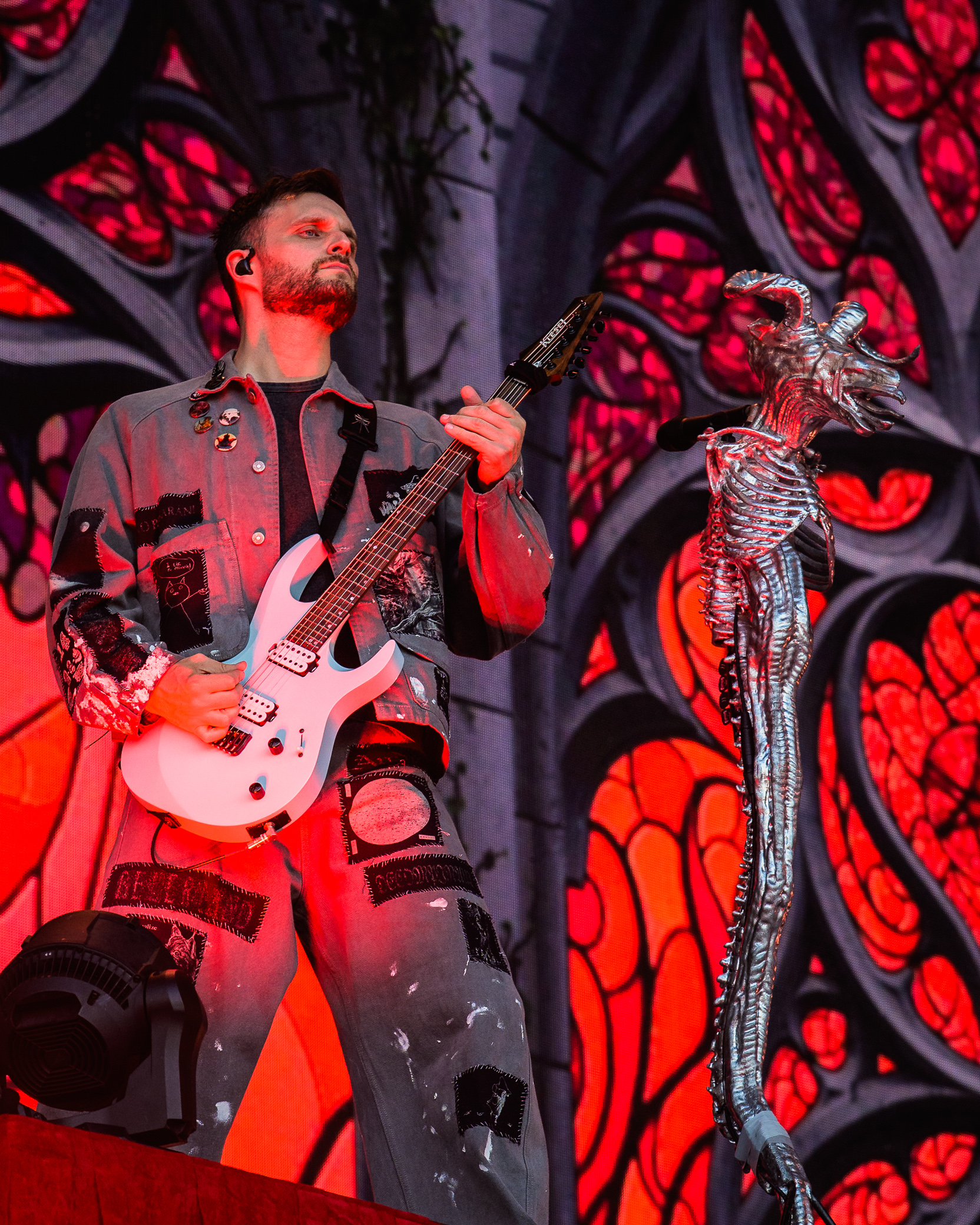
John Jones (touring)

Current members

- Oli Sykes – lead vocals (2004–present), keyboards, programming (2023–present)
- Matt Nicholls – drums (2004–present), percussion (2023–present)
- Lee Malia – lead guitar (2004–present), rhythm guitar (2013–present)
- Matt Kean – bass (2004–present)

Current touring musicians

- John Jones – rhythm guitar, backing vocals (2014–present)

Former members

- Curtis Ward – rhythm guitar (2004–2009; guest performer 2014)
- Jona Weinhofen – rhythm guitar, backing vocals (2009–2013)
- Jordan Fish – keyboards, programming, drum pads, percussion, backing vocals (2013–2023; session musician 2012)

Former touring musicians

- Dean Rowbotham – rhythm guitar (2009)
- Robin Urbino – rhythm guitar (2013)
- Tim Hillier-Brook – rhythm guitar (2013)
- Brendan MacDonald – rhythm guitar, backing vocals (2013–2014)
- Sage Weeber – drums (2023; substitute for Matt Nicholls)
- Joey Black – lead guitar (2024; substitute for Lee Malia)

Timeline

== Discography ==
Studio albums

- Count Your Blessings (2006)
- Suicide Season (2008)
- There Is a Hell Believe Me I've Seen It. There Is a Heaven Let's Keep It a Secret. (2010)
- Sempiternal (2013)
- That's the Spirit (2015)
- Amo (2019)
- Post Human: Nex Gen (2024)

== Awards and nominations ==
Grammy Awards

Year	Nominee / work	Award	Result	Ref.
2019	"Mantra"	Best Rock Song	Nominated	
2020	Amo	Best Rock Album	Nominated	

BRIT Awards

Year	Nominee / work	Award	Result	Ref.
2020	Bring Me the Horizon	Best British Group	Nominated	
2024	Bring Me the Horizon	Best Rock/Alternative Act	Won	
2025	Bring Me the Horizon	Best British Group	Nominated	

NME Awards

Year	Nominee / work	Award	Result	Ref.
2017	Bring Me the Horizon	Best Live Band	Nominated	
2017	Bring Me the Horizon	Music Moment of the Year	Nominated	
2020	Bring Me the Horizon	Best Band in the World	Nominated	
2022	Bring Me the Horizon	Best Band in the World	Nominated	
2022	Bring Me the Horizon	Best Live Act	Nominated	

Kerrang! Awards

Year	Nominee / work	Award	Result	Ref.
2006	Bring Me the Horizon	Best British Newcomer	Won	
2008	Bring Me the Horizon	Best British Band	Nominated	
2009	Bring Me the Horizon	Best British Band	Nominated	
2011	"Blessed with a Curse"	Best Single	Nominated	
2011	Bring Me the Horizon	Best British Band	Nominated	
2011	There Is a Hell Believe Me I've Seen It. There Is a Heaven Let's Keep It a Secret.	Best Album	Won	
2012	"Alligator Blood"	Best Video	Won	
2013	"Shadow Moses"	Best Single	Nominated	
2013	"Shadow Moses"	Best Video	Nominated	
2013	Sempiternal	Best Album	Nominated	
2013	Bring Me the Horizon	Best British Band	Won	
2014	Bring Me the Horizon	Best Live Band	Won	
2014	Bring Me the Horizon	Best British Band	Nominated	
2015	Bring Me the Horizon	Best British Band	Won	
2015	"Drown"	Best Single	Nominated	
2016	Bring Me the Horizon	Best British Band	Nominated	
2019	Amo	Best Album	Nominated	
2019	Bring Me the Horizon	Best British Act	Won	

AIM Independent Music Awards

Year	Nominee / work	Award	Result	Ref.
2011	Bring Me the Horizon	Best Live Act	Nominated	
2011	Bring Me the Horizon	Hardest Working Band or Artist	Nominated	
2011	Bring Me the Horizon	Independent Breakthrough of Year	Nominated	

Alternative Press

Year	Nominee / work	Award	Result	Ref.
2014	Sempiternal	Best Album	Won	
2014	Bring Me the Horizon	Best International Band	Won	
2015	"Drown"	Best Music Video	Won	

UK Music Video Awards

Year	Nominee / work	Award	Result	Ref.
2016	"True Friends"	Best Rock/Indie Video – UK	Nominated	

Heavy Music Awards

Year	Nominee / work	Award	Result	Ref.
2017	Bring Me the Horizon	Best UK Band	Nominated	
2019	Bring Me the Horizon	Best UK Band	Won	
2019	Bring Me the Horizon	Best Live Band	Nominated	
2020	Bring Me the Horizon	Best UK Band	Won	
2020	Amo	Best Album	Nominated	
2020	Amo	Best Album Artwork	Nominated	
2020	"In the Dark"	Best Video	Nominated	
2021	Post Human: Survival Horror	Best Album	Won	
2021	Bring Me the Horizon	Best UK Band	Won	
2022	"Die4U"	Best Single	Won	
2022	Bring Me the Horizon	Best Live Band	Nominated	
2022	Bring Me the Horizon	Best UK Band	Nominated	
2022	"Die4U"	Best Video	Nominated	
2025	Post Human: Nex Gen	Best Album	Won	
2025	Bring Me the Horizon	Best UK Artist	Nominated	
2025	Bring Me the Horizon	Best UK Live Artist	Nominated	

Morecore Music Awards

Year	Nominee / work	Award	Result	Ref.
2026	"Dehumanized"	Music Video of the Year	Won	
2026	Bring Me the Horizon	Live Act of the Year	Nominated	

Readers polls

- In a 2009 Rock Sound readers' poll, Bring Me the Horizon achieved both Best British Band and Worst British Band.
- In 2011 The Guardian ran a poll for "Who should win the Mercury prize?" and used 50 albums, Bring Me the Horizon's third album There Is a Hell... won with 37%.
- In a 2013 SiriusXM published poll, Bring Me the Horizon won Best Song Discovery for "Go to Hell, for Heaven's Sake" with the Octane radio station.
- In a 2013 Alternative Press readers poll, Bring Me the Horizon was nominated for four categories: Best Vocalist (Oliver Sykes; position 3), Best Keyboardist (Jordan Fish; position 1), Single Of The Year ("Shadow Moses"; position 2) and "Best Album Art" (Sempiternal; position 2).
- In 2021, Kerrang! readers voted "Die4U" as the best song and music video of the year. Bring Me the Horizon was also voted as the best band and best live band of the year. They were also voted as the second-best cover story of the year by Kerrang Magazine.
