= Teardrops (Bring Me the Horizon song) =

2020 single by Bring Me the Horizon

Single by Bring Me the Horizon

from the album Post Human: Survival Horror
- Released: 22 October 2020
- Recorded: 2020
- Studio: Casa do Syko (United Kingdom)
- Genre: Nu metal; metalcore; hard rock; alternative rock; emo; pop
- Length: 3:35
- Label: Sony; RCA
- Songwriters: Oliver Sykes; Jordan Fish
- Producers: Oliver Sykes; Jordan Fish

Bring Me the Horizon singles chronology
"Obey" (2020)	"Teardrops" (2020)	"Die4U" (2021)

Music video
- "Teardrops" on YouTube

"Teardrops" is a song by British rock band Bring Me the Horizon. Produced by the band's vocalist Oliver Sykes and keyboardist Jordan Fish, it was released as the fourth and final single from the group's 2020 commercial release Post Human: Survival Horror on 22 October 2020.

== Promotion and release ==
After an announcement regarding information for a September 2021 UK arena tour was released, the band revealed a teaser for the new music video for "Teardrops" that would be dropped the following day.

== Composition and lyrics ==
"Teardrops"
A 30 second audio clip of the chorus.

"Teardrops" has been described by critics as nu metal, metalcore, hard rock, alternative rock, emo, and pop. It was written by the band's lead vocalist Oliver Sykes and keyboardist Jordan Fish. The song talks about kids growing up in today's age with tech addiction being commonplace and the problems of it. It also talks about depression and anxiety. The music video represents Sykes’ struggles with his mental health and drug abuse, but he overpassed it because of his bandmates. According to an interview with NME, the song is Sykes' personal favourite on Post Human: Survival Horror. During the production of "Teardrops", Sykes tried to convince Fish to incorporate elephant trumpet noises into the song. Initially done as a joke, Sykes and Fish opted to sneak the sound into the song and heavily pitched and played with the reverb to disguise the obvious noises to fit in with the rest of the song, it first notably happens at around 10 seconds into the song.

"Teardrops" is heavily inspired by nu metal with most critics comparing the song to Linkin Park's older sound. It was also noted that the song's chord progression took inspiration from the aforementioned band's "Somewhere I Belong" on their second studio album Meteora (2003). Speaking about the song overall, Sykes explains his thoughts on "Teardrops" at the time of release:

"I'm so excited to get this single out, it feels like a classic Bring Me the Horizon tune but without it feeling like anything we've done before. I feel like 'Teardrops' is some of the best work we've ever done, musically and lyrically as whole."

Additionally, Sykes would explain his thought process on the meaning behind "Teardrops" in an interview with BBC Radio 1:

"Tech addiction is so normal for us these days. We're addicted to our phones, addicted to our computers, to media, the news. We wake up in the morning, and no one says 'You shouldn't check your phone first thing in the morning, and just look at bad news or social media.' No one tells us that. That's like inviting thousands of chatty strangers to your bedroom at like 7:05. We're all in the same boat, so no one really likes talking about it. But the mental impact of the way we're living now, the way our society is, I don't think we've really seen the after effects or the repercussions of that and I think we will soon. This song is about how our moral compass is a little bit skewed because we're so numb to the bad news every single day and it's hard to know what we should actually do about that. I think it's very dangerous because when we hear these stories of oppression, tragedies or whatever. It's like: Do I scream? Do I shout? Do I tell someone? Do I fight about it or do I sit down? We're losing our touch with how to react to this stuff. I mean, I'm feeling that as a 33 year old man. You have kids, who, for them it's completely acceptable and normal to live how we're living right now. I don't know how to deal with that."

== Commercial performance ==
Following "Parasite Eve" and "Obey", "Teardrops" would continue the trend set by the formers by debuting in the UK Singles Chart within the Top 40, debuting and peaking at number 39. The song would also debut on the Scottish Singles Chart for a solitary week at number 62. The song would simultaneously debut and peak on the UK Singles Sales, UK Downloads and the UK Streaming charts at 46, 45, and 77 respectively.

Post Human: Survival Horror was released on 30 October, which would help keep "Teardrops" steadily in the Top 100 for the following two weeks, 49 and 90, before dropping out of the charts completely on 20 November 2020. Simultaneously, "Teardrops" would debut atop the UK Rock & Metal Singles Chart and stay top of the charts for two weeks. It would chart for nine consecutive weeks, before dropping out on 1 January 2021, before re-entering the following week at number 38 on 8 January 2021 after all the Christmas songs dropped off the charts. It would bumble in and out of the Top 40 in January and the beginning of February, spending a combined total of 12 non-consecutive weeks on the UK Rock & Metal Singles chart before dropping out completely on 12 February 2021.

In the US, "Teardrops" sold 3000 digital downloads and also racked up 1.9 million streams within its first week. This resulted in the song debuting and peaking at number 44 on the Digital Song Sales chart, number 16 on the Hot Rock & Alternative Songs chart and debuted atop the newly introduced Hot Hard Rock Songs chart by Billboard.

== Music video ==
The music video for "Teardrops" was released on the same day as the single. Directed by Sykes himself, the video takes inspirations from his battle with depression during the lockdown period, in which this would be represented in the scenes with him drowning.

The video would start off with Sykes sitting on a bed, before sinking into the bed into an ocean of water, in which he would sing as he's drowning. This would be shown in between cuts of him sinking into a bathtub and going crazy. It would later be shown that a figure was the one drowning Sykes into the water and creeping over him while he's sleeping in bed. Eventually, Sykes is pulled up out of the water by the helping hand of Jordan Fish and then joins the rest of his bandmates for the rest of the song.

== In popular culture ==
- A heavily censored radio edit of "Teardrops" was included in the Forza Horizon 5 soundtrack.

== Charts ==
=== Weekly charts ===
Weekly chart performance for "Teardrops"
Chart (2020–2021)	Peak position
Australia Digital Tracks (ARIA)	42
Czech Republic Singles Digital (ČNS IFPI)	99
New Zealand Hot Singles (RMNZ)	23
Scotland Singles (OCC)	62
UK Singles (OCC)	39
UK Rock & Metal (OCC)	1
US Digital Song Sales (Billboard)	44
US Hot Rock & Alternative Songs (Billboard)	16
US Rock & Alternative Airplay (Billboard)	20

=== Year-end charts ===
Year-end chart performance for "Teardrops"
Chart (2021)	Position
US Hot Hard Rock Songs (Billboard)	5
US Mainstream Rock (Billboard)	1

== Certifications ==
Certifications for "Teardrops"
Region	Certification	Certified units/sales
Australia (ARIA)	Gold	35,000^{‡}
Brazil (Pro-Música Brasil)	Gold	20,000^{‡}
United Kingdom (BPI)	Silver	200,000^{‡}
United States (RIAA)	Gold	500,000^{‡}
^{‡} Sales+streaming figures based on certification alone.
