= Kingslayer (disambiguation) =

A kingslayer is a person who commits regicide.

Kingslayer may also refer to:

- The Kingslayer, a 1949 short story collection by L. Ron Hubbard
- Jaime Lannister, a fictional character in the A Song of Ice and Fire series
- Malo kingi, a jellyfish known as the common kingslayer
- Seth Rollins (born 1986), nicknamed the "Kingslayer" in WWE
- A Super Friends villain
- "Kingslayer", a song by Bring Me the Horizon featuring Babymetal from the commercial release Post Human: Survival Horror, 2020
- "Kingslayer", a song by Grand Magus from the album Wolf's Return, 2005
