= Ludens (song) =

Single by Bring Me the Horizon

from the album Post Human: Survival Horror and Death Stranding: Timefall
- Released: 6 November 2019
- Recorded: 2019
- Studio: Fonoprint Studios (Bologna, Italy); Unknown hotel room (Ukraine)
- Genre: Electronic rock; pop rock; electropop; metalcore
- Length: 4:40
- Label: Sony; RCA
- Songwriters: Oliver Sykes; Jordan Fish
- Producers: Oliver Sykes; Jordan Fish

Bring Me the Horizon singles chronology
"In the Dark" (2019)	"Ludens" (2019)	"Parasite Eve" (2020)

Music video
- "Ludens" on YouTube

"Ludens" is a song by British rock band Bring Me the Horizon. Produced by the band's vocalist Oliver Sykes and keyboardist Jordan Fish, it was released as the fifth single of the soundtrack Death Stranding: Timefall on 6 November 2019, and was featured as the first single from the group's 2020 commercial release Post Human: Survival Horror.

== Promotion and release ==
On 1 October 2019, it was revealed that the video game Death Stranding was getting an official soundtrack album titled Death Stranding: Timefall after Scottish band Chvrches released their song "Death Stranding" as its lead single. Along with the announcement of the album, the track listing was revealed, which included the band's "Ludens".

On 4 November, the band shared a photo of a floppy disk-like device with the numbers 06.11.19 written on it. The next day, they revealed that "Ludens" would be on BBC Radio 1 with Annie Mac in promotion of the single.

== Composition and lyrics ==
"Ludens" has been described by critics as being an electronic rock, pop rock, electropop, and a metalcore song. The song was written by the band's lead vocalist Oliver Sykes and keyboardist Jordan Fish, initially for the video game Death Stranding and its soundtrack Death Stranding: Timefall, but is also featured on the band's commercial release Post Human: Survival Horror.

Sykes and Fish wrote and recorded the song in less than a week, with Sykes attributing the short deadline to "legal shit" with Sony and Kojima. Sykes requested an extension or an option to submit a placeholder demo instead, but both requests were declined. The song was created while the band was touring in Europe, with Sykes and Fish setting up temporary studios in hotel rooms. "Ludens" is the name of Kojima Productions' company icon and mascot. The tagline of Kojima Productions is 'From Sapiens to Ludens'. The Latin word 'Ludens' simultaneously refers to play and practice. More to it, the game character Die-Hardman wears a carbon skull mask with Ludens text on the forehead. However, the character is not present in Death Stranding. When asked about the identity of the mascot, Hideo Kojima responded:

"That's everyone, that's us, that's the users, that's each one of us wearing that skull mask."

Sykes has stated that musically the song was inspired by the 1999 film The Matrix and the nu metal and industrial metal that was featured on its official soundtrack. According to Sykes, the song's lyrics are centred around the human race and its ability to adapt while also tying into the themes of Death Stranding. The song's lyrics were partly inspired by environmental activist Greta Thunberg while lyrically, it is also a political song, as Sykes told NME:

"I don't want to come across as a hypocrite. Our music has always been about human emotions and the human condition. I've never tried to talk about how the world is. I've just been thinking about how I can start talking about it. I'm not a politically-charged person. I don't want to be. I don't want to talk about politics and I don't want to sing about politics, but if you're talking about environmental issues then you can't talk about one without the other. It just felt like a great way to start talking about that. It uses quotes from the game [Death Stranding] and stuff, but I'm talking about the bigger picture. We need to be our own heroes. We need a new way of looking at things. Greta Thunberg has shown us that—it's crazy, but this kid has proven that we can be our own leaders. We don't need to wait for these other people. It goes through the motions of what's wrong with the world and what we can do to fix it."

Physical releases of Post Human: Survival Horror bear a different lyric in the second verse of the song. This alternative version of the song replaces the line "names can dig so many graves, you won't know where to stand" with the more graphic and potentially controversial line "names will make me blow the brains out of all the kids in class". Initially, only the physical release contained the original line, however, in May 2025 the digital version of the song available on streaming services were updated to include this line.

== Commercial performance ==
"Ludens" entered the UK Singles Chart on 15 November 2019, peaking at number 75 for a solitary week. It, however, fared much better on the Scottish Singles Chart, peaking at number 53 and staying on the chart for three consecutive weeks. It simultaneously entered the UK Downloads and UK Singles Sales chart, both peaking at 45 for three total weeks on the charts respectively.

"Ludens" debuted and peaked on the UK Rock & Metal Singles Chart at number 2, being denied the top spot by Queen's "Bohemian Rhapsody". The song spent a total of seven consecutive weeks on the chart.

== Music video ==
The music video for "Ludens" was released shortly after the single was initially streamed. Directed by Sykes himself, it features the band playing to a relatively small crowd while they mosh to the music and protest, with footage from Death Stranding being shown throughout the video. In the behind the scenes video for the song's music video, Sykes states:

"The concept of the video is kinda like it's got a kinda protesty rally feel to it because the song has kinda got this message of you've got this choice, basically we can give up we and let the world and everything else give up or we can all start making an effort start working together to try and save it."

== Charts ==
Chart performance for "Ludens"
Chart (2019)	Peak position
Australia Digital Tracks (ARIA)	37
Hungary (Single Top 40)	14
New Zealand Hot Singles (RMNZ)	35
Scotland Singles (OCC)	53
UK Singles (OCC)	75
UK Rock & Metal (OCC)	2
US Hot Rock & Alternative Songs (Billboard)	13

== Certifications ==
Certifications for "Ludens"
Region	Certification	Certified units/sales
Australia (ARIA)	Gold	35,000^{‡}
Brazil (Pro-Música Brasil)	Gold	20,000^{‡}
^{‡} Sales+streaming figures based on certification alone.
