= Alissic =

Brazilian musician (born 1997)

- Born: Victoria Alissa Salles Silva; November 3, 1997 (age 28); Brazil
- Occupations: Singer; model
- Spouse: Oli Sykes (m. 2017)
- Children: 2
- Musical career
- Genres: Alt-pop; avant-pop; hyperpop
- Instruments: Vocals; xylophone; flute
- Years active: 2020–present
- Labels: Sony UK; Ministry of Sound
- Website: smaalissic.world

Victoria Alissa Salles Silva (born November 3, 1997), popularly known as Alissic, is a Brazilian singer and model. Her first single "Like", released in 2020, was written by herself together with her husband (and English vocalist) Oli Sykes.

== Career ==
Alissic was scouted by a model agency at the age of 15 and later dropped out of school. After 8 years of working in the industry she lost interest and wanted to do something more creative with her career. She, then, started experimenting with making music at her bedroom even though she thought this was something really hard to do as a profession. She always had a love for fashion and illustrations, and found that music was the perfect combination of the two. As a child, she would be a member in choirs and would play music instruments such as xylophone and flute but when she started working as a model she did not have the time to develop these skills further.

In 2020, she released her first single, "Like" firstly independently but later, in 2021, it was re-released under Ministry of Sound, the first song she wrote after she abandoned her modeling career. Her music talks about everyday problems, such as mental health, feminism or death. Her husband, Oli Sykes has a significant impact on her music career as he assists her when producing and writing music, directing her music videos and has also taught her stage tricks, how to produce and write music on her own.

At first, she wanted to be an independent artist but when a lot of labels contacted her after hearing "Like", she considered this was a way of exposing her ideas on a bigger scale and decided to join Ministry of Sound. However, after signing she had the pressure to have an active role on social media which did not met her likings as a musician, therefore ending their partnership with the label.

Alissic's method of creating is unusual. As mentioned in Equate, while in the studio she creates detailed story boards and rudimentary sketches to represent her vision for the music she wants to make and also uses her iPad to write her lyrics alongside to drawings to create the song's vibe and idea. She claims that this method helps her produce better and it is the right method for her. Her music does not have a basic theme and every song is different from the other, reflecting to her personality.

In 2023, she released her fourth single, "Everybody's Dead Inside", which is co-written by Bring Me the Horizon members, Oli Sykes and Jordan Fish. It was also later revealed that she had designed the artwork of Bring Me The Horizon's albums Music to Listen To..., Post Human: Survival Horror and Post Human: Nex Gen. She also provided the female vocals on the band's hit song Parasite Eve.

In 2025, she released "Concrete", a track from her first EP after revealing she has unsigned from any label and will be releasing her music independently through her own label, CLASII Records. Furthermore, she has created a project called Erfling, through which she collects money for the aid of indigenous communities in Amazon rainforest. Later the same year, her first musical collaboration with German artist Au/Ra was released, named "Moonbeans". In May the same year, she released her first EP, "ARC 01: MAIDEN".

== Inspirations ==
Salls' music is inspired by 2000s' pop. She enjoys both pop and eerie things and is trying to create a character that is like Britney Spears but part of a Tim Burton film. Also, Björk's single "Big Time Sensuality" gave her inspiration to start writing music. Among her music influences is also the creator of the xylophone, Albert Roth. Her music has Latin American vibes as she has revealed it reminds her of her homeland. Some of her favorite artists are Linkin Park, Avril Lavigne, Evanescence, Kate Bush, PJ Harvey and Joanna Newsom and the Brazilian acts of Novos Baianos and Secos & Molhados.

== Personal life ==
Salls was born and raised in São Bento do Sapucaí, Brazil.

On July 22, 2017, Salls married British singer and songwriter Oli Sykes. In an interview with NME she revealed that the two had met when she was working as a model on a project for Sykes' Drop Dead Clothing Line, when they realized they shared creative ideas that they had in common.

In March 2021, Sykes shared a photo on Instagram confirming he stayed in Brazil with her for the entirety of the COVID-19 pandemic to that point, that he had acquired a CPF number, and had bought a house in the city of Taubaté, countryside of the state of São Paulo, where he was living with her.

As of 2022, the singer is based and lives in Sheffield, UK with her spouse.

In May 2025, Salls and Sykes revealed through their personal Instagram accounts, that she was expecting twins, a girl and a boy, alongside a gender reveal video. On 18 July 2025, Salls announced that she had given birth to their son and daughter.

== Discography ==
=== Extended plays ===
List of extended plays, showing selected details
Title	Details
ARC 01: Maiden	Released: May 30, 2025; Label: CLASSII Records; Formats: CD, DL, LP, 12" CS

=== Singles ===
List of singles, showing year released and name of the album
Title	Year	Album
"Like"	2020	Non-album singles
"Piano"	2021	Non-album singles
"Superstitious"	2022	Non-album singles
"Everybody's Dead Inside"	2022	Non-album singles
"bugfood"	2022	Non-album singles
"CONCRETE"	2025	Non-album singles
"Moonbeans" (with Au/Ra)	2025	Non-album singles
