= Pray for Plagues =

Single by Bring Me the Horizon

from the album Count Your Blessings
- Released: 4 June 2007
- Studio: DEP International Studios (Birmingham, West Midlands)
- Genre: Deathcore
- Length: 4:21 (album version); 4:16 (edit); 4:26 (Repented verson)
- Label: Visible Noise; Earache
- Songwriters: Curtis Ward; Lee Malia; Matt Kean; Matt Nicholls; Oli Sykes
- Producers: Bring Me the Horizon; Dan Sprigg

Bring Me the Horizon singles chronology
"Pray for Plagues" (2007)	"For Stevie Wonder's Eyes Only" (2008)

Music video
- "Pray for Plagues" on YouTube

"Pray for Plagues" is the debut single by British rock band Bring Me the Horizon. It was released on 4 June 2007 as the lead single from their debut studio album, Count Your Blessings, via Visible Noise and Earache Records.

== Background ==
"Pray for Plagues" was released on 4 June 2007, as the band's debut single from their 2006 album, Count Your Blessings.

In 2011, the song was included on the video game Rock Band. The song was featured on their 2015 live album, Live at Wembley, recorded in December 2014. In 2017, Epitaph Records released a compilation album for the band titled 2004–2013, which features "Pray for Plagues".

== Composition ==
"Pray for Plagues" was written by Curtis Ward, Lee Malia, Matt Kean, Matt Nicholls and Oli Sykes, while Dan Sprigg and the band themselves handled production. It was recorded at DEP International Studios in Birmingham, West Midlands. Malia recalled writing his guitar parts on the song, noting how the picking style was "really weird" and "all over the place." His playing style on the song includes sweep picking in the D minor scale.

== Critical reception ==
Emily Carter of Kerrang! gave a positive response to the track stating, "just listen to that roll-of-barbed-wire-hitting-a-guitar-riff. Deadly, mate, deadly." Merlin Alderslade of Louder noted that the song "still crushes."

== Legacy ==
"Pray for Plagues" has been regarded as one of the most beloved Bring Me the Horizon songs by older fans of the band. In 2014, Loudwire ranked the track as the fourth best Bring Me the Horizon song, describing it as one of the group's "most timeless tracks." In 2022, Kerrang! ranked the song as the 14th greatest Bring Me the Horizon song, calling it one of the band's "early standout."

== Live performances ==
The group has performed the track many times live throughout 2006 to 2011. Sykes has expressed his disdain for performing the song live. On The Downbeat Podcast, keyboardist Jordan Fish, who was not a part of the band during the time of the song's release, revealed that Nicholls also does not like playing the song live because of how his drumming technique has changed over time. However, in 2014, the group performed the song live for the first time since 2011 in London at Camden Underworld. At the performance, the band reunited with former rhythm guitarist Curtis Ward, who left the band in 2009. The band also performed the song with Ward at Wembley Arena in December 2014. The group performed the track in 2019, at The Dome in London. In 2022, the group played the song at their own festival in Malta performing a throwback set and were joined by Alex Taylor of Malevolence. As of 2023, the band has performed the song only five times in the last twelve years.

== Music video ==
The music video for "Pray for Plagues" was released on 4 June 2007. The video was directed by Kenny Lindström.

== Track listing ==
Digital download
No.	Title	Length
1.	"Pray for Plagues"	4:21
2.	"Pray for Plagues" (edit)	4:16
Total length:		8:37

== Personnel ==
Credits for "Pray for Plagues" adapted from the album's liner notes.

Bring Me the Horizon

- Oli Sykes – vocals
- Lee Malia – guitar
- Curtis Ward – guitar
- Matt Kean – bass
- Matt Nicholls – drums

Production

- Bring Me the Horizon – producer
- Dan Sprigg – producer, mixing, mastering

== Charts ==
Chart performance for "Pray for Plagues"
Chart (2026)	Peak position
New Zealand Hot Singles (RMNZ)	24
US Hot Hard Rock Songs (Billboard)	8

== Release history ==
Release history for "Pray for Plagues"
Region	Date	Format	Label	Ref.
Various	4 June 2007	Digital download	Visible Noise; Earache	
