= Obey (Bring Me the Horizon and Yungblud song) =

2020 single by Bring Me the Horizon and Yungblud

Single by Bring Me the Horizon and Yungblud

from the album Post Human: Survival Horror
- Released: 2 September 2020
- Recorded: 2020
- Studio: Casa do Syko (United Kingdom)
- Genre: Industrial metal; nu metal; alternative metal; electronic metal; pop metal; pop-punk; hard rock
- Length: 3:40
- Label: Sony; RCA
- Songwriters: Oliver Sykes; Jordan Fish; Dominic Harrison
- Producers: Oliver Sykes; Jordan Fish

Bring Me the Horizon singles chronology
"Parasite Eve" (2020)	"Obey" (2020)	"Teardrops" (2020)

Yungblud singles chronology
"Lemonade" (2020)	"Obey" (2020)	"God Save Me, but Don't Drown Me Out" (2020)

Music video
- "Obey" on YouTube

"Obey" is a song by British rock band Bring Me the Horizon and English singer Yungblud. Produced by the band's vocalist Oliver Sykes and keyboardist Jordan Fish, it was released as the third single from the group's 2020 commercial release Post Human: Survival Horror on 2 September 2020.

"Obey" was voted as Annie Mac's "Hottest Record of the Year" in 2020.

== Promotion and release ==
In May 2020, Yungblud tweeted out a cryptic tweet asking Oliver Sykes and Jordan Fish to check their inboxes. This led to a lot of speculation and teasing of a collaboration between the band and the singer. Sykes later revealed that the band and Yungblud "have something coming". The track was then officially teased when Sykes posted a QR code leading to a website with a snippet of the music video.

Within a week until the song's release, both of the artists revealed promotional pictures for the collaboration which pictured Sykes and Yungblud being half naked and covered in blood, that would feature a caption that said "u ain't ready".

== Composition and lyrics ==
"Obey" has been described as a "massive, genre-bending call-to-arms" industrial metal, nu metal, alternative metal, electronic metal, pop metal, pop-punk and a hard rock song, including elements of electronic dance music and rave music. It was written and composed by Oliver Sykes, Jordan Fish and Yungblud during quarantine times for the COVID-19 pandemic. The lyrics talk about the oppression that people suffer because of world leaders and politicians. It is written mostly from the point of view of the oppressor, as Sykes told Forbes:

"It was written in April, May, of this year, and it was very much inspired by everything that's going on, and very much from the side of the oppressor. I think everyone has been stopped in their tracks, and I think a lot of people are realising that maybe the people in charge aren't looking out for our best interests. The way that we're fed traumatic and devastating news on a daily basis, I think the powers that be or whatever you want to call them, they've gotten very good at getting us desensitised to this information, and we have been sleepwalking for a while where we know all this horrible stuff is going on, but we didn't do anything about it."

== Music video ==
The music video for "Obey" was released on the same day as the single. Directed by Sykes himself, the video features two giant robots which look like a Power Ranger/Transformer hybrid, that are both controlled by Sykes and Yungblud. Before confronting, the two robots dance and then engage in a fight where the robot controlled by Yungblud knocks the other robot down. When the robot controlled by Sykes gets up, they both seem to lose control of their respective robots who then make out with each other and then stroll off into the sunset.

The song surpassed 1 million views within the first 24 hours after premiering on YouTube. In its first week, the video for the song reached 4.4 million views.

== Personnel ==
Credits adapted from Tidal.

Bring Me the Horizon

- Oliver Sykes – lead vocals, production, engineering
- Lee Malia – guitars
- Jordan Fish – keyboards, programming, percussion, backing vocals, production, engineering
- Matt Kean – bass
- Matt Nicholls – drums

Additional personnel

- Yungblud – vocals
- Mick Gordon – percussion, synthesiser, additional production
- Jordan Baggs – backing vocals
- Luke Burywood – backing vocals
- Clayton Deakin – backing vocals
- Tom Millar – backing vocals
- Giles Stelfox – backing vocals
- Sam Winfield – backing vocals
- Chris Athens – mastering
- Zakk Cervini – mixing, recording
- Carl Bown – recording

== In popular culture ==
In 2021, "Obey" was used as the theme song for WWE's NXT TakeOver: Vengeance Day PPV. The song was used in MX vs. ATV Legends

== Charts ==
Chart performance for "Obey"
Chart (2020)	Peak position
Australia (ARIA)	99
France (SNEP Sales Chart)	166
New Zealand Hot Singles (RMNZ)	29
Scotland Singles (OCC)	31
UK Singles (OCC)	37
UK Rock & Metal (OCC)	1
US Digital Song Sales (Billboard)	49
US Hot Rock & Alternative Songs (Billboard)	21

== Certifications ==
Certifications for "Obey"
Region	Certification	Certified units/sales
Australia (ARIA)	Gold	35,000^{‡}
United Kingdom (BPI)	Silver	200,000^{‡}
^{‡} Sales+streaming figures based on certification alone.
