= Count Your Blessings: Repented =

Count Your Blessings | Repented

Studio album (re-recorded) by Bring Me the Horizon
- Released: 10 July 2026
- Studios: Rhythmic Genocide (Sheffield); Maison de Malia (Sheffield); Casa do Syko (Brazil); Teach Ciúin de Kean (Los Angeles)
- Genres: Deathcore; melodic death metal; metalcore
- Length: 40:47
- Labels: RCA; Sony
- Producer: Bring Me the Horizon

Bring Me the Horizon chronology
| L.I.V.E. in São Paulo (2026) | Count Your Blessings | Repented (2026) |

Singles from Count Your Blessings | Repented
- 1. "Black & Blue (2026 Repented)" Released: 12 June 2026; 2. "Dehumanized" Released: 25 June 2026

Count Your Blessings | Repented is the 20th anniversary re-recording of British rock band Bring Me the Horizon's debut studio album, Count Your Blessings. It was recorded at Oli Sykes' home studio in Brazil, produced by Sykes and Lee Malia, and released through RCA Records on 10 July 2026.

== Background and promotion ==
In April 2026, the band announced a re-recording of the album for its 20th anniversary, titled Count Your Blessings | Repented, which was released on 10 July 2026. Recorded at Sykes' house in Brazil, vocalist Sykes and guitarist Malia worked together with Swedish musician and producer Buster Odeholm to make the anniversary edition, which contains all 10 tracks re-recorded and a then-unknown bonus 11th track.

While the original record has become widely-regarded as a large influence for heavy music, Sykes said in an interview on the Nik Nocturnal Podcast that the band weren't happy with the original recording, and that they "can't have this record sounding like what bands sound like today. It needs to be the best version of what it sounded like in 2006," with the band aiming for more "grandiose" production. In the same interview. Sykes also said that they had not anticipated the large positive reception of the re-recording's announcement, noting that the release was intended to be a small release in the band's plan for the year, with a new album originally intended to be released later in the year.

On 9 June at a concert in Kraków, the band teased the title of the 11th track, "Dehumanized". The band released the first re-recorded song, "Black & Blue", on 12 June.

The bonus track, "Dehumanized", the only new material for the re-recording, was released on 25 June. The song serves as a criticism of voices being silenced in modern society, as well as critiquing the meat industry.

On its release date of 10 July, the band played the album in full at Manchester BEC Arena, with supporting performances from Static Dress, Rolo Tomassi, Dying Wish, Heriot, Car Underwater, Still in Love, and Showing Teeth. The band played a US performance at Furnace Fest in Birmingham, Alabama on October 11.

== Critical reception ==
Professional ratings
Review scores
| Source | Rating |
|---|---|
| AllMusic | 3.5/5 stars |
| Kerrang! | 4/5 |
| Sputnikmusic | 1.5/5 (Futures); 4.0/5 (Simon K.) |

James Hickie of Kerrang! called the re-recording "impressive", and wrote that it was "overhauled but not overdone" noting that the quality matched the band's quality they have developed over the years while still keeping its original deathcore feel, going further to say that tracks such as "Pray for Plagues", "Black & Blue" and "Off the Heezay", are still "absolute bangers, but they’re armour-plated ones now". Noting on the themes of the lyrics on the original tracks, Hickie also mentioned that the new track, "Dehumanized", reflects on how the band have "grown up" from the older lyrics that may now be "deemed misogynistic".

Reviews from Sputnikmusic were mixed. Simon K.'s review was mostly positive, stating "Repented is a textbook case on how to do a release like this [a re-recording] properly", and praised the improvement of the production compared to the original, though still felt some of the breakdowns and riffs were repetitive. Futures' review however was more critical, calling the album "unnatural" and "unrecognizable", stating they preferred the rawness and imperfections of the original release, though praised Sykes' vocal performance.

== Track listing ==
All lyrics are written by Oliver Sykes; all music is composed by Bring Me the Horizon.

Count Your Blessings | Repented track listing
| No. | Title | Length |
|---|---|---|
| 1. | "Pray for Plagues" | 4:26 |
| 2. | "Tell Slater Not to Wash His Dick" | 3:39 |
| 3. | "For Stevie Wonder's Eyes Only (Braille)" | 4:28 |
| 4. | "A Lot Like Vegas" | 2:11 |
| 5. | "Black & Blue" | 4:32 |
| 6. | "Slow Dance" (Instrumental) | 1:37 |
| 7. | "Dragon Slaying" | 2:40 |
| 8. | "(I Used to Make Out With) Medusa" | 6:05 |
| 9. | "Fifteen Fathoms, Counting" | 1:55 |
| 10. | "Off the Heezay" | 6:05 |
| 11. | "Dehumanized" | 4:28 |
| Total length: | | 42:13 |

=== Notes ===
- Track 3 is written in uncontracted braille (⠋⠕⠗ ⠎⠞⠑⠧⠊⠑ ⠺⠕⠝⠙⠑⠗⠎ ⠑⠽⠑⠎ ⠕⠝⠇⠽) on the release. This is transcribed as "For Stevie Wonders Eyes Only".
- "Dragon Slaying" was the original working title of Track 7 and is used in this release, in the album's original release this track is titled "Liquor & Love Lost".

== Personnel ==
Credits are adapted from the album's liner notes and Apple Music.

=== Bring Me the Horizon ===
- Oli Sykes – vocals, production, 2006 art direction and packaging
- Lee Malia – guitars, production
- Matt Kean – bass, production
- Matt Nicholls – drums, production

=== Additional personnel ===
- Waterbear College of Music – vocals
- Buster Odeholm – mixing, mastering
- Seth Munson – mastering
- Naweed – vinyl mastering
- Irene Genova – editing
- Harry James – engineering, vocal production
- Owen Claxton – additional engineering, vocal engineering
- James Carey – additional engineering
- Zakk Cervini – additional production on "Dehumanized"
- Jacob Harry Carter – 2026 art direction and packaging
- Tom Barnes – band photography
- Marianne Harris – band photography

== Charts ==
Chart performance
| Chart (2026) | Peak position |
|---|---|
| Australian Albums (ARIA) | 5 |
| Austrian Albums (Ö3 Austria) | 3 |
| Belgian Albums (Ultratop Flanders) | 6 |
| Belgian Albums (Ultratop Wallonia) | 9 |
| Danish Vinyl Albums (Hitlisten) | 23 |
| Dutch Albums (Album Top 100) | 13 |
| Finnish Albums (Suomen virallinen lista) | 19 |
| French Albums (SNEP) | 43 |
| French Rock & Metal Albums (SNEP) | 3 |
| German Albums (Offizielle Top 100) | 2 |
| Hungarian Physical Albums (MAHASZ) | 19 |
| Irish Albums (IRMA) | 81 |
| Italian Albums (FIMI) | 74 |
| Japanese Download Albums (Billboard Japan) | 24 |
| New Zealand Albums (RMNZ) | 24 |
| Portuguese Albums (AFP) | 155 |
| Scottish Albums (Official Charts) | 4 |
| Swedish Albums (Sverigetopplistan) | 9 |
| Swedish Hard Rock Albums (Sverigetopplistan) | 1 |
| UK Albums (Official Charts) | 6 |
| UK Rock & Metal Albums (Official Charts) | 2 |
| US Top Album Sales (Billboard) | 30 |

== Release history ==
| Region | Date | Format | Label | Ref. |
|---|---|---|---|---|
| Various | 10 July 2026 | CD; vinyl; cassette; digital download; streaming | Sony; RCA | |
