= Dehumanized (song) =

Single by Bring Me the Horizon

from the album Count Your Blessings | Repented
- Released: 25 June 2026
- Studio: Casa do Syko (Brazil)
- Genre: Deathcore
- Length: 4:28
- Label: Sony; RCA
- Songwriters: Oli Sykes; Lee Malia
- Producers: Oli Sykes; Lee Malia

Bring Me the Horizon singles chronology
"Black & Blue (2026 Repented)" (2026)	"Dehumanized" (2026)

Music video
- "Dehumanized" on YouTube

"Dehumanized" is a song by British rock band Bring Me the Horizon. Written and produced by vocalist Oli Sykes and guitarist Lee Malia, the song was released on 25 June 2026, through RCA Records, as the second single from the band's 2026 re-recording of their debut album, Count Your Blessings. The song became the band's seventh to reach number one on the Billboard Hot Hard Rock Songs chart.

== Background and promotion ==
In April 2026, the band announced Count Your Blessings | Repented, a re-recording of their debut album, featuring a then-untitled 11th bonus track.

During a performance in Kraków, Poland on 9 June, the band showed a video depicting torture and gore, ending simply with the word "dehumanized", leading to speculation that something with that title was being teased. An extended version of the teaser, styled as a film trailer, was released on 21 June, confirming that it was the title of a new single and announcing the release date of 25 June. The song and music video were released on 25 June. The song was recorded at Sykes' house in Brazil.

== Music video ==
The music video released 25 June 2026 and was directed by Sykes and Eric Richter. The video, containing gore, blood and terror, has been compared to the Saw franchise, and has been described as "aggressive", "unsettling" and "very NSFW". It depicts references and criticisms of factory farming and the meat industry, with extras credited as "cattle, surgeons, and hospital staff", owing to the band member's beliefs on veganism and vegetarianism. Sykes called the video's setting a "fully operational human slaughterhouse".

== Live performances ==
The song debuted live on 10 July 2026, during the band's release day performance of the whole Repented album at Outbreak Festival in Manchester.

== Composition and lyrics ==
"Dehumanized" has been described as deathcore.

The song has been called a "bridge between past and present", noted for "carrying the unrelenting aggression and chaos of the band's earliest material while reflecting the scope, ambition and sonic precision that have defined Bring Me the Horizon's evolution".

Sykes said the song spawned from being told peacefully waving Palestinian flags at the 2025 Reading and Leeds Festivals and recognising the Gaza genocide would have "career ending consequences", taking to social media he said: "It made me realise how we are silently we're conditioned to suppress our humanity. We think were are free, conscious beings, when in truth we are driven by forces we barely understand". In the same post, Sykes also cited inspiration from the book Tender Is the Flesh, and also the use of an abattoir as a metaphor for "being put in a place where my very livelihood is facing execution" and an "analogy for modern civilisation".

== Personnel ==
Credits are adapted from Tidal.

Bring Me the Horizon

- Oli Sykes – lead vocals, production, composition, lyrics
- Matt Nicholls – drums
- Lee Malia – guitars, production, composition, lyrics
- Matt Kean – bass

Additional personnel

- Buster Odeholm – mixing, mastering
- Seth Munson – mastering
- Harry James – engineering, vocal production
- Irene Genova – editing
- Zakk Cervini – additional production
- James Carey – additional engineering
- Owen Claxton – additional engineering
- Waterbear College of Music – gang vocals

== Accolades ==
Awards and nominations for "Dehumanized"
Year	Award ceremony	Category	Result	Ref.
2026	Morecore Music Awards	Music Video of the Year	Won	

== Charts ==
Chart performance for "Dehumanized"
Chart (2026)	Peak position
Australia Digital Tracks (ARIA)	45
New Zealand Hot Singles (RMNZ)	11
UK Singles Downloads (Official Charts)	91
UK Rock & Metal (Official Charts)	11
US Hot Hard Rock Songs (Billboard)	1
