= Stay True =

Stay True may refer to:

- Stay True (album), 2008 album by Deez Nuts
- Stay True (memoir), 2022 memoir by Hua Hsu
