= Count Your Blessings =

Studio album by Bring Me the Horizon
- Released: 30 October 2006
- Studios: DEP International Studios (Birmingham, West Midlands)
- Genres: Deathcore; melodic death metal; metalcore
- Length: 36:19
- Labels: Visible Noise (UK); Earache (US)
- Producers: Dan Sprigg; Bring Me the Horizon

Bring Me the Horizon chronology
This Is What the Edge of Your Seat Was Made For (2004)	Count Your Blessings (2006)	Suicide Season (2008)

Singles from Count Your Blessings
- 1. "Pray for Plagues" Released: 4 June 2007; 2. "For Stevie Wonder's Eyes Only (Braille)" Released: 6 March 2008

Count Your Blessings is the debut studio album by British rock band Bring Me the Horizon. Recorded at DEP International Studios in Birmingham with producer Dan Sprigg, it was originally released in the United Kingdom on 30 October 2006 by Visible Noise. The album was later issued by Earache Records in the United States on 14 August 2007. Count Your Blessings was supported by the release of the album's two singles: "Pray for Plagues" on 4 June 2007 and "For Stevie Wonder's Eyes Only (Braille)" on 6 March 2008.

Named after a lyric in the album's opening song "Pray for Plagues", Count Your Blessings is representative of the band's early deathcore sound, which was phased out on later releases and eventually abandoned in favour of other, less aggressive styles. The band members were young when they recorded the album, and the band has largely disregarded it later in their career; it began as early as 2008, when guitarist Lee Malia was already criticising the album's quality. Most of the songs on the record quickly faded from the band's live setlists. Most band members recorded their parts individually, rather than the group doing so as a whole, with the central location of the studio credited as "a distraction".

The album initially received mixed reviews upon release, with praise aimed at the instrumentation, intensity and promising musical potential showed by the band, while the main complaints revolved around musical originality, elements of the lyricism and the unrefined production, although it still reached number 93 on the UK Albums Chart. It has since gone on to be considered an essential release in the deathcore genre.

In 2026, the band released a 20th anniversary re-recording of the album, titled Count Your Blessings | Repented.

== Background and recording ==
Following the release of their first extended play This Is What the Edge of Your Seat Was Made For in October 2004, Bring Me the Horizon toured extensively while writing new material for their full-length debut album. Due to the number of shows the band were playing at the time, much of the material was written quickly before recording was due to begin—drummer Matt Nicholls claimed that three songs were written in the space of two days due to the upcoming deadline.

Recording took place at DEP International Studios in Birmingham, West Midlands with producer Dan Sprigg, who had previously worked with bands including Cradle of Filth, Napalm Death, and, more recently, Lostprophets. Frontman Oliver Sykes described the recording process as "an intense experience" due to the group's desire to make the best debut album they could, with biographer Ben Welch claiming that they "were starting to feel the pressure of all of the hype that was building around them" at the time. Due to the studio's location in the centre of the city, the young band members (all under 20 years old at the time) would often leave the studio to explore the city and would only spend their mandatory time in the studio working on their parts; this meant that each individual member ended up recording the majority of their contributions to the album alone, rather than the full unit performing together.

== Music ==
When recording Count Your Blessings, Bring Me the Horizon intended to make an album which sounded "as heavy and brutal as they possibly could"; Welch claims that the band scrapped any song ideas that "didn't fit that criterion". Speaking in 2014 about the band's intentions when writing and recording music during their early years, Sykes claimed the group "just wanted to make noisy music". Similarly, when asked about the band's beginnings in a 2014 interview, guitarist Lee Malia explained, "When you're young, you just want to do everything to extremes. That's what the first EP and the album were like: too over-excited sounding". Matt Nicholls said that on Count Your Blessings, Bring Me the Horizon "were influenced a lot by Swedish metal—At The Gates and stuff like that". Nicholls also said that on Count Your Blessings, Bring Me the Horizon's members "were 18 or 19 years old and wanted to be as metal as possible." Specifically, the band's members were influenced by Norma Jean, Skycamefalling, Metallica, Pantera, At the Gates, Arch Enemy, The Dillinger Escape Plan, and In Flames at the band's beginning.

The musical style of Count Your Blessings is most often categorised as deathcore, but has also been labeled as metalcore and melodic death metal. Count Your Blessings uses elements of genres like melodic death metal, death metal, and black metal, drawing comparisons to bands like The Black Dahlia Murder, Cannibal Corpse, At the Gates, and Obituary. Last Rites noted that the album's "black metal-reminiscent vocals" were placed over a musical base of melodic death metal. According to Drowned in Sound columnist Raziq Rauf, the songs on the album "generally consist of The Black Dahlia Murder-style thunderous riffs mixed with some dastardly sludgy doom moments and more breakdowns than your dad's old Nissan Sunny". The lyrical content is admittedly simple, which according to Sykes is due to the fact that his life had "never been that bad" at the time he wrote them; the singer has noted that most songs on the album are "about girls or just growing up", which he claims contributes to the group's brand of "party music".

== Promotion and release ==
Count Your Blessings was originally released in the United Kingdom on 30 October 2006 by Visible Noise. It was not released in the United States until 14 August 2007, when it was issued by Earache Records. The version released by retailer Hot Topic featured a cover version of American nu metal band Slipknot's "Eyeless" as a bonus track, which had originally been recorded for Higher Voltage: Another Brief History of Rock, a CD released for free with an issue of Kerrang! magazine in June 2007. A first music video for "Pray for Plagues", was directed by Kenny Lindström and released on 4 June 2007. A second music video, directed by Perrone Salvatore, "For Stevie Wonder's Eyes Only (Braille)" was issued on 6 March 2008.

Following the release of Count Your Blessings, Bring Me the Horizon toured extensively in support of the album. Throughout October and November the group toured the UK with American black metal band Abigail Williams, although the Phoenix, Arizona-based band left the tour early on after drummer Zach Gibson suffered a wrist injury. Centurion replaced Abigail Williams for the remainder of the tour, and Bring Me the Horizon spent the rest of the year supporting labelmates Lostprophets. The band later replaced Bury Your Dead supporting Killswitch Engage on their European tour in January 2007, then continued to tour the UK through March and April. During the summer, the band played a number of festivals (including Download Festival).

== Critical reception ==
Professional ratings
Review scores
Source	Rating
About.com	2/5 stars
AllMusic	2.5/5 stars
Chronicles of Chaos	8.5/10
MetalSucks	2.5/5 stars
Terrorizer	7/10

Upon its release, Count Your Blessings debuted at number 93 on the UK Albums Chart. It also peaked at number 9 on the UK Rock & Metal Albums Chart and remained there for two further weeks, first dropping to number 14 and then to number 26.

Overall, Count Your Blessings received mixed critical reception. Exclaim! writer Bill Whish wrote positively about the release, praising the "vitriolic lyrics and brutally heavy guitar work" and welcoming the band as "a little more interesting" than some other metalcore artists. DIY magazine's Tom Connick dubbed "(I Used to Make Out With) Medusa" the "crowning jewel" of Count Your Blessings in a 2014 feature, claiming that it "Perfectly [captures] that youthful, drunken recklessness that defined [the band's] most controversial years" with its "razor sharp" guitar work and "thunderous breakdowns". Aaron McKay, a writer for Chronicles of Chaos, praised Sykes' vocal delivery, likening it to Obituary frontman John Tardy.

However, many commentators criticised the lack of invention on the album. While AllMusic's Stewart Mason praised the album for being "vaguely interesting musically" as well as claiming that there is "a greater sense of dynamic than usual" in the genre on the release, he also commented on the "generally unimaginative songwriting", claiming it adds "little to the existing knowledge base" of the genre. Furthermore, he also criticised Sykes's vocal style on the record, which he described as an "immediately irritating" and a "high-pitched gibber". Chad Bowar for About.com highlighted the band within their scene, praising their "catchy melodies" and "decent riffs and solos", and on Count Your Blessings welcomed the variety in styles of vocal delivery across the collection. However, similarly to Mason, Bowar dubbed the album "way too generic and repetitive", claiming that it features "too many breakdowns" and a majority of "extremely forgettable" songs. Axl Rosenberg of MetalSucks complained that the band displayed "nothing to distinguish them from the pack" on the album, although he did praise the presence of "some decent breakdowns" and claim that the songs would make "good background noise".

== Impact ==
Due to the young age of the band when they recorded the album and the drastic stylistic changes which followed its release, Count Your Blessings has largely been neglected in recent years, both by the band and by their fans. As early as 2008, guitarist Lee Malia was criticising the album's quality and noting that the band quickly wanted "to do something better" after its release. Following the release of "Drown" in 2014, described by Digital Spy's Adam Silverstein as "a universe away from the ... full-on commotion" of Count Your Blessings, Sykes reflected that the single would have "offended" the band members when they were younger, adding that the group were "never gonna sound like that again".

Keyboardist Jordan Fish (who joined Bring Me the Horizon about 6 years after the album's release) has explained the drastic evolution in style between Count Your Blessings and later releases as simply being due to the fact that the band members "don't listen to deathcore anymore", claiming that to attempt that type of music again would be dishonest due to the members' change in tastes and feelings. Alternative Press writer Tyler Sharp has added that "The members of Bring Me the Horizon have evolved from teenage metalheads to a group of mature, progressed songwriters" in response to criticism of their change in style. Most of the album's songs were dropped from live performances in the years following the release of Suicide Season and There Is a Hell..., although "Pray for Plagues" returned to set lists briefly in late 2014 when the band performed with original guitarist Curtis Ward at a few shows. The song is featured on the video album Live at Wembley, recorded in December 2014.

Despite the radical evolution of the band since Count Your Blessings, the album has still received some retrospective praise. In a feature published in 2015, Kerrang! writer Emily Carter credited the album for increasing the popularity of the band during their formative years, as well as praising its guitar riffs and the song "Pray for Plagues". AXS contributor Rey Harris described the album as "a classic among deathcore fans", highlighting "Black & Blue" in particular. Sarai C. of Loudwire named "Pray for Plagues" the fourth best Bring Me the Horizon song to date (as of May 2014), praising it as "one of Bring Me the Horizon's most timeless tracks". Dan Slessor for Alternative Press included "Tell Slater Not to Wash His Dick" as the alternative tenth choice in his feature of "The 10 best Bring Me the Horizon songs", praising its "exuberant energy and rich melody".

In 2021, Joe Smith-Engelhardt of Alternative Press included the album in his list of "30 deathcore albums from the 2000s that define the genre". That same year, Eli Enis of Revolver included the album in their list of "15 Essential Deathcore Albums", where they wrote: "Count Your Blessings is a relic of its era in so many ways—the haircuts, the production quality, the fact that BMTH sound the way they do—but there's no denying the MySpace popularity of a song like Pray for Plagues, and the fact that it still goes hard as fuck".

== Count Your Blessings: Repented ==
In April 2026, the band announced a re-recording of the album for its 20th anniversary, titled Count Your Blessings | Repented, which was released on 10 July 2026. The band released two singles from the album; "Black & Blue", on 12 June, and the new bonus track, "Dehumanized", on 25 June.

== Track listing ==
All lyrics are written by Oli Sykes; all music is composed by Bring Me the Horizon, except where noted.

Count Your Blessings track listing
No.	Title	Length
1.	"Pray for Plagues"	4:21
2.	"Tell Slater Not to Wash His Dick"	3:30
3.	"For Stevie Wonder's Eyes Only (Braille)"	4:29
4.	"A Lot Like Vegas"	2:09
5.	"Black & Blue"	4:33
6.	"Slow Dance"	1:16
7.	"Liquor & Love Lost"	2:39
8.	"(I Used to Make Out With) Medusa"	5:39
9.	"Fifteen Fathoms, Counting"	1:56
10.	"Off the Heezay"	5:39
Total length:		36:19

Hot Topic edition bonus track
No.	Title	Writer(s)	Length
11.	"Eyeless" (Slipknot cover)	Corey Taylor; Josh Brainard; Paul Gray; Joey Jordison; Shawn Crahan; Mick Thomson; Chris Fehn; Sid Wilson; Craig Jones	4:04
Total length:			40:13

Notes

- Track 2 is censored on the tracklist as "D**k", but without censoring in the booklet.
- On the cover of the CD variant, the title of track 3 is written in incorrect braille as ⠿⠪⠻ ⠩⠹⠂⠷⠔⠂ ⠱⠪⠢⠫⠂⠻⠩ ⠂⠴⠂⠩ ⠪⠢⠼⠴. On the cover of the vinyl variant and in both variants' booklets, the title is written in correct, albeit uncontracted braille as ⠋⠕⠗ ⠎⠞⠑⠧⠊⠑ ⠺⠕⠝⠙⠑⠗⠎ ⠑⠽⠑⠎ ⠕⠝⠇⠽. Although the braille text would be transcribed as "For Stevie Wonders Eyes Only", the song is usually titled "For Stevie Wonder's Eyes Only (Braille)" in official media, such as the title of the song's music video. On a promo CD it's simply titled "Braille", and a vinyl test pressing calls it "Braille (For Stevie Wonder's Eyes Only)".
- Track 4 is written as "Alot Like Vegas" on the track listing. This was corrected on later versions.
- Track 11 is written as "Eyeless (Slipknot)" on the track listing.

== Personnel ==
Credits adapted from the liner notes of Count Your Blessings, Visible Noise.

Bring Me the Horizon

- Oli Sykes – vocals
- Lee Malia – guitar
- Curtis Ward – guitar
- Matt Kean – bass
- Matt Nicholls – drums

Additional personnel

- Bring Me the Horizon – production, recording
- Dan Sprigg – production, recording, mixing, mastering
- Tom Barnes – photography

== Charts ==
Chart performance for Count Your Blessings
Chart (2006)	Peak position
UK Albums (Official Charts)	93
UK Rock & Metal Albums (Official Charts)	9

Chart performance for Count Your Blessings
Chart (2026)	Peak position
German Rock & Metal Albums (Offizielle Top 100)	2
Polish Albums (ZPAV)	96
Swiss Albums (Schweizer Hitparade)	7
UK Rock & Metal Albums (Official Charts)	26

== Certifications ==
Region	Certification	Certified units/sales
United Kingdom (BPI)	Silver	60,000^{‡}
^{‡} Sales+streaming figures based on certification alone.

== Release history ==
Region	Date	Format	Label	Ref.
United Kingdom	30 October 2006	CD; digital download	Visible Noise	
United States	14 August 2007	CD; digital download	Earache	
