= Deez Nuts (band) =

Australian hardcore band

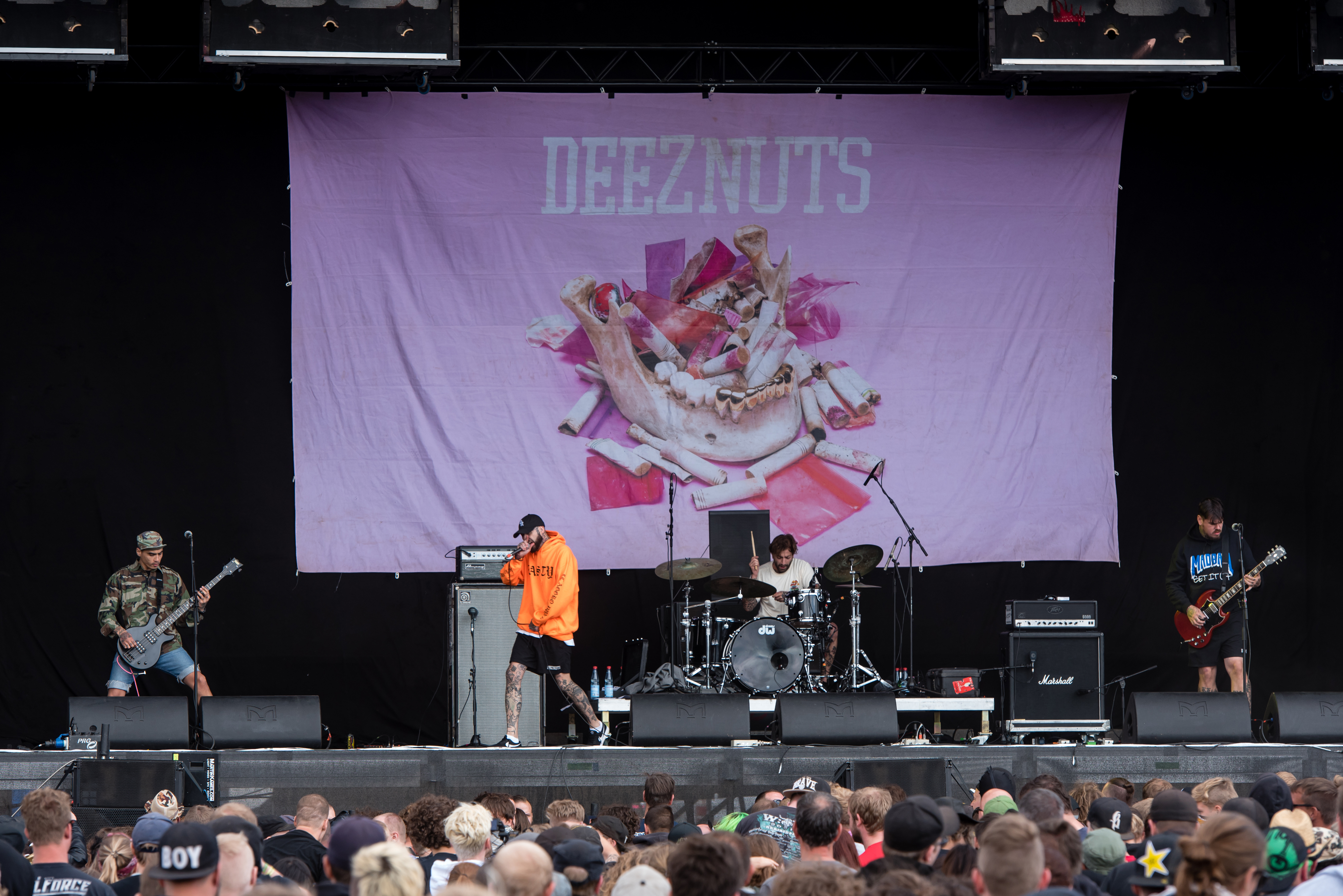
- Deez Nuts at Reload Festival 2018

Background information
- Origin: Melbourne, Victoria, Australia
- Genres: Hardcore punk, rapcore
- Years active: 2007–present
- Labels: Stomp; Roadrunner; Century Media; UNFD
- Members: JJ Peters; Matt Rogers; Alex Salinger
- Past members: Stuart Callinan; Ty Alexander; Jon Green; Sean Kennedy
- Website: deeznutshardcore.com

Deez Nuts are an Australian hardcore band that formed in Melbourne in 2007. The group is noted for its inspiration from hip hop both musically and aesthetically. Deez Nuts currently consists of vocalist JJ Peters, guitarist Matt Rogers (a.k.a. Real Bad), and drummer Alex Salinger. The band has released one EP and six studio albums.

logo of the band

== History ==
=== Formation and Rep Your Hood (2007–2008) ===
Deez Nuts started after the disbanding of Australian metalcore band I Killed the Prom Queen, of which JJ Peters was the drummer. After being heavily influenced by the hip hop and hardcore punk styles of music, Peters decided to start Deez Nuts. After he wrote a few songs he entered the studio to record the 2007 Deez Nuts demo performing all instruments and vocals.

On the 2007 Deez Nuts demo, all instruments and vocals were performed by JJ Peters, the band's founder.

Acquiring live members, Peters and the band played a few shows around Melbourne. After such a positive response, Peters entered the studio again to finish recording Deez Nuts' first public release, an EP titled Rep Your Hood; Peters performed everything on the EP. Shortly after the release, Deez Nuts embarked on their first tour of Australia during October 2007, the infamous Drunk and Disorderly Tour, with friends The Amity Affliction and the Daylight Curse.

=== Stay True (2008–2010) ===
After a short break, the band then set out on an Australian Boys of Summer Tour in January 2008 with Silverstein, alongside Set Your Goals, the Amity Affliction and Capeside. The tour was a huge success for the band, who were growing bigger within the Australian hardcore community. Shortly after the Boys of Summer Tour, Peters began writing the next release for the band.

Peters placed Deez Nuts on hold for the months of May and June 2008, to focus on his commitment to the I Killed the Prom Queen farewell tour. I Killed the Prom Queen's Say Goodbye Tour took place in May and June 2008, with most shows selling out almost immediately. The supporting acts for the tour were Bring Me the Horizon, the Red Shore, the Ghost Inside and a local act from each city played at. After the tour, Peters continued writing for the debut album of Deez Nuts.

The Deez Nuts debut album was recorded by Roman Koester of the Red Shore at Complex Studios in August 2008. After the recording process, Deez Nuts embarked on a tour of Australia in September 2008, joined by I Killed the Prom Queen alumni Michael Crafter's new band Confession. Then in October, Deez Nuts was invited to tour Europe with English deathcore act Bring Me the Horizon along with friends the Red Shore and Ignominious Incarceration. During this tour of Europe, Deez Nuts' first album, Stay True, was released on 4 October 2008, in Australia by Stomp Entertainment. Once returning from Europe, Deez Nuts began planning a National Australian tour in support of Stay True'. The Stay True Tour took place from January to February 2009, supported by hip hop artist Louie Knuxx.

After a string of Australian shows, Deez Nuts returned to Europe to tour with English hardcore band Your Demise. During this tour, Deez Nuts organised a few headline shows in England, which received positive reviews and crowd reaction. The band immediately headed to the U.S. for a tour with American hardcore act Ligeia. Upon arrival in the country, the band was denied entry as a result of misinformation with their paperwork, and were sent back to Australia.

During the time in between tours Peters spent back in Australia, he formed a hip hop/rap group called Grips & Tonic with New Zealand rapper Louie Knuxx. The group released a full-length album, Want Some, Get Some, which was released in June 2008.

In June and July 2008, Deez Nuts toured Australia again on the second Drunk and Disorderly Tour with The Amity Affliction, this time playing much larger venues than the last tour, mainly because both bands had gained a larger fanbase because of recent album releases. At the after parties for the tour, Peters' new group Grips & Tonic played a string of shows, which received positive reviews.

In September 2008, Deez Nuts headlined the Australian Sike Your Mind tour, playing alongside Miles Away, Antagonist A.D., and in Trenches and Blkout. In October 2008, Deez Nuts returned to Europe with Swedish band Raised Fist, and returned to the Australian live scene in December on the Schools Out for Summer Tour with American band The Ghost Inside, Australian bands Mark My Words and Mourning Tide, and Peters' Grips & Tonic project.

=== This One's for You and Bout It! (2010–present) ===
Deez Nuts released their second studio album, This One's for You, on 21 May 2010 (in Australia). It was recorded by Roman Koester of the Red Shore at Complex Studios in April 2010, and frontman Peters stated that it only took him two weeks to write. The album features appearances by several guest vocalists, including Oli Sykes of Bring Me the Horizon on the song "If You Don't Know Now You Know". This One's for You was followed by Deez Nuts' third album, Bout It!, which was released in March 2013. Bout It! features guest appearances from a number of musicians and was produced by Shane Frisby (The Ghost Inside). It consists of 16 tracks, including the singles "Band of Brothers" and "Shot After Shot".

In fall 2011, Deez Nuts went to the United States to open up for Bring Me the Horizon. Parkway Drive, Architects, On Broken Wings and Of Legends all played on the tour.

In March 2014, bassist Jon Green decided to leave Deez Nuts to focus on his personal life. He was replaced by Sean Kennedy, who is one of the original members of the band as well as a long time member of I Killed the Prom Queen alongside JJ Peters.

Deez Nuts next album, Word is Bond was released in 2015.

Deez Nuts returned to the United States in fall 2015, supporting Stray from the Path and Comeback Kid on The Subliminal Criminals Tour. Being as an Ocean and Major League also joined up on the lineup.

In 2017, Deez Nuts released their next album called Binge & Purgatory.

Deez Nuts returned to the United States in summer 2018, playing on the entire Vans Warped Tour. They played alongside acts like The Amity Affliction, Phinehas, Simple Plan, Unearth, Motionless in White, Harm's Way, Dayseeker, Nekrogoblikon, Less Than Jake, Twiztid, Chelsea Grin and many others.

Bassist Sean Kennedy committed suicide in February 2021, he was 35 years old.

== Band members ==
Current

- JJ Peters – vocals (2007–present); bass, guitars, drums (2007–2008)
- Matt Rogers – guitars (2010–present)
- Alex Salinger – drums (2010–present)

Former

- Stuart Callinan – guitars (2008–2010)
- Ty Alexander – drums (2008–2010)
- Jon Green – bass (2010–2014)
- Roman Koester – bass (2009–2010)
- Sean Kennedy – bass (2008–2009, 2014–2021; his death)

Timeline

== Discography ==
=== Studio albums ===
List of albums, with selected details and peak chart positions
Title	Album details	Peak chart positions	
Title	Album details	AUS	GER
Stay True	Released: October 2008; Label: Stomp Entertainment; Format: CD, digital	80	—
This One's for You	Released: May 2010; Label: Roadrunner; Format: CD, digital	44	—
Bout It!	Released: April 2013; Format: CD, digital; Label: UNFD, Century Media	35	76
Word Is Bond	Released: April 2015; Format: CD, LP, digital; Label: UNFD, Century Media	20	34
Binge & Purgatory	Released: April 2017; Format: CD, LP, digital; Label: Century Media	46	78
You Got Me Fucked Up	Released: October 2019; Format: CD, LP, digital; Label: Century Media	—	61

=== EPs ===
List of EPs, with selected details
Title	Details
Rep Your Hood	Released: August 2007; Format: CD; Label: Stomp Entertainment (STMPCD005)
