= Word Is Bond =

Studio album by Deez Nuts
- Released: 21 April 2015
- Genre: Hardcore punk; rapcore
- Length: 34:50
- Label: Century Media; UNFD

Deez Nuts chronology
Bout It! (2013)	Word Is Bond (2015)	Binge & Purgatory (2017)

Word Is Bond is the fourth studio album by Australian hardcore punk band, Deez Nuts, released on 21 April 2015 via Century Media Records and UNFD. It peaked at No. 20 on the ARIA Albums Chart and No. 34 on the German Albums Chart.

== Track listing ==
No.	Title	Length
1.	"Word"	1:14
2.	"Yesterday" (featuring Dre Faivre of Hellions)	3:39
3.	"Pour Up"	2:04
4.	"What's Good"	2:20
5.	"Behind Bars" (featuring Andrew "Goose" Neufeld of Comeback Kid)	3:16
6.	"What I Gotta Do"	1:28
7.	"Chess Boxin'"	2:08
8.	"Don't Wanna Talk About It"	1:25
9.	"Face This on My Own"	2:37
10.	"Wrong This Right"	3:22
11.	"Understand"	0:49
12.	"Party at the Hill" (featuring Andrew Drew York Dijorio of Stray from the Path)	3:21
13.	"The Message"	3:22
14.	"Word Is Bond"	3:45
