= Kingslayer (song) =

Song by Bring Me the Horizon featuring Babymetal

from the album Post Human: Survival Horror
- Language: English; Japanese
- Released: 30 October 2020
- Length: 3:38
- Label: Sony; RCA
- Songwriters: Oliver Sykes; Jordan Fish; Mk-metal
- Producers: Jordan Fish; Oliver Sykes

Music video
- Live in Tokyo on YouTube

"Kingslayer" is a song by British rock band Bring Me the Horizon and Japanese kawaii metal band Babymetal. Produced by Bring Me the Horizon's lead vocalist Oliver Sykes and keyboardist Jordan Fish, the song appears on the group's 2020 commercial release Post Human: Survival Horror.

Despite not being released as a single, the song has become a critical and commercial success, charting at no. 51 on the UK Singles Chart and receiving sales certifications in several countries.

== Composition and lyrics ==
Oliver Sykes described the song as "sound[ing] like an anime TV trailer."

Sykes initially came up for the idea of the song while he was playing Call of Duty in Amsterdam, with the Kingslayer being what everyone wants to be. He used this idea as an analogy for then US president Donald Trump calling Antifa a "terrorist organization" and the chaos caused by the Extinction Rebellion, with Sykes feeling that people have to go out and do what they feel is right, no matter the cost. Hence the themes and for "Kingslayer" to break the barriers of the reality. Sykes would go on to compare the sound of the song to something off their second studio album Suicide Season, and how the cute vocals of Babymetal on the chorus would make for a perfect contrast on "Kingslayer".

Babymetal originally recorded all of their parts in English before Sykes asked them to re-record in Japanese.

== Live performances ==
The two bands toured Japan together in October 2023, performing "Kingslayer" throughout the tour. A live music video was released for "Kingslayer" composed of footage from the Tokyo performance on 12 December 2023. Bring Me the Horizon and Babymetal would perform the song live together again at Sick New World 2024. and on June 20, 2026 at Graspop Metal Meeting.

== Personnel ==
Bring Me the Horizon

- Oliver Sykes – lead vocals, production, engineering
- Lee Malia – guitars
- Jordan Fish – programming, backing vocals, production, engineering
- Matt Kean – bass
- Matt Nicholls – drums

Babymetal

- Su-metal – lead vocals
- Moametal – backing vocals

== Charts ==
Chart performance for "Kingslayer"
Chart (2020)	Peak position
New Zealand Hot Singles (RMNZ)	24
UK Singles (OCC)	51
UK Rock & Metal (OCC)	2
US Hot Rock & Alternative Songs (Billboard)	26

== Certifications ==
Certifications for "Kingslayer"
Region	Certification	Certified units/sales
Australia (ARIA)	Gold	35,000^{‡}
Brazil (Pro-Música Brasil)	Gold	20,000^{‡}
United Kingdom (BPI)	Silver	200,000^{‡}
United States (RIAA)	Gold	500,000^{‡}
^{‡} Sales+streaming figures based on certification alone.
