= Binge & Purgatory =

Studio album by Deez Nuts
- Released: April 7, 2017
- Recorded: December 2016 @ The Brick Hithouse Studio
- Genre: Hardcore punk; rapcore
- Length: 31:58
- Label: Century Media; Sony Music Entertainment
- Producer: Andrew Neufeld; Shane Frisby; Deez Nuts

Deez Nuts chronology
Word Is Bond (2015)	Binge & Purgatory (2017)	You Got Me Fucked Up (2019)

Binge & Purgatory is the fifth studio album by Australian hardcore band Deez Nuts. It was released on April 7, 2017 through Century Media and Sony Music Entertainment. The album debuted at number 46 on the ARIA Albums Chart.

== Track listing ==
No.	Title	Length
1.	"Binge"	0:50
2.	"Purgatory"	2:21
3.	"Antidote" (featuring Scott Vogel)	2:39
4.	"Commas & Zeros"	3:23
5.	"Break Out"	2:37
6.	"Discord"	2:56
7.	"Lessons Learned" (featuring Jamey Jasta)	2:27
8.	"Carried by Six"	0:31
9.	"Cakewalk"	2:50
10.	"For What It's Worth"	3:17
11.	"Hedonistic Wasteland"	1:59
12.	"Remedy"	2:51
13.	"Do Not As I Do"	3:17

== Personnel ==
Deez Nuts

- JJ Peters – vocals
- Matt Rogers – guitars
- Sean Kennedy – bass, vocals
- Alex Salinger – drums
- Slim – backing vocals
- Burke – backing vocals
- RB – backing vocals
- SK – backing vocals
- Goose – backing vocals

Production

- Andrew Neufeld – production
- Shane Frisby – production, engineering
- Peter Rutcho – mastering, mixing

== Charts ==
Chart performance for Binge & Purgatory
Chart (2017)	Peak position
Australian Albums (ARIA)	46
German Albums (Offizielle Top 100)	78
Swiss Albums (Schweizer Hitparade)	84
