= Death Stranding: Timefall =

Music from the video game Death Stranding

Soundtrack album to Death Stranding by various artists
- Released: November 7, 2019
- Genre: Video game music
- Length: 28:59
- Label: RCA; Sony

Singles from Death Stranding: Timefall
- 1. "Death Stranding" Released: October 1, 2019; 2. "Yellow Box" Released: October 10, 2019; 3. "Ghost" Released: October 17, 2019; 4. "Trigger" Released: October 24, 2019; 5. "Ludens" Released: November 6, 2019; 6. "Sing to Me" Released: November 6, 2019

Death Stranding: Timefall (Original Music from the World of Death Stranding) is a soundtrack album for the 2019 action game, Death Stranding. Featuring eight songs from various artists, it was released on November 7, 2019 in digital stores, through RCA Records and Sony Interactive Entertainment.

== Background ==
RCA Records has partnered with Sony Interactive Entertainment to release the soundtrack. Then, they announced it on October 1, 2019. Simultaneously, Chvrches released their track, of the same name as the game, and posted it on YouTube and streaming platforms. Chvrches met Hideo Kojima, the game creator, earlier in 2019 when they toured Kojima Productions headquarters. According to him, Chvrches' "Death Stranding" will appear as "the ending song of the game". He added via Twitter: "You can cry just by listening to this song. You'll find out the true value of my strand with them in the game." The band said:

"We were really excited about the opportunity to work with Kojima because we have been fans of his work for a long time. He has always been such a visionary in the gaming world and we were honored to be involved in the project. The concept of Death Stranding is so unique and really felt to us like it was challenging people to care about the world they create — in the game and otherwise. We wrote this song specifically for Death Stranding, thinking of the themes of the game and what it is trying to say to people."

It also features a song from American band The Neighbourhood. They said:

"We're very flattered to be chosen by Kojima to be a part of this project. This is the first time we've ever had our music in a video game and it's gonna be a trip hearing it while playing Death Stranding."

The soundtrack also features a song by the British band Bring Me the Horizon, who visited the creator's studio in Japan and gifted the designer signed CDs and vinyl records. Enthusiastic, Hideo Kojima thanked them on August 15, 2019 via Twitter, leaving the following message: "Bring Me the Horizon has visited Kojima Productions. Thanks for the CD and vinyls !" The trailer for Death Stranding also included the track "Path" by Finnish cello metal group Apocalyptica, however, the track was not included on the official soundtrack.

== Album design ==
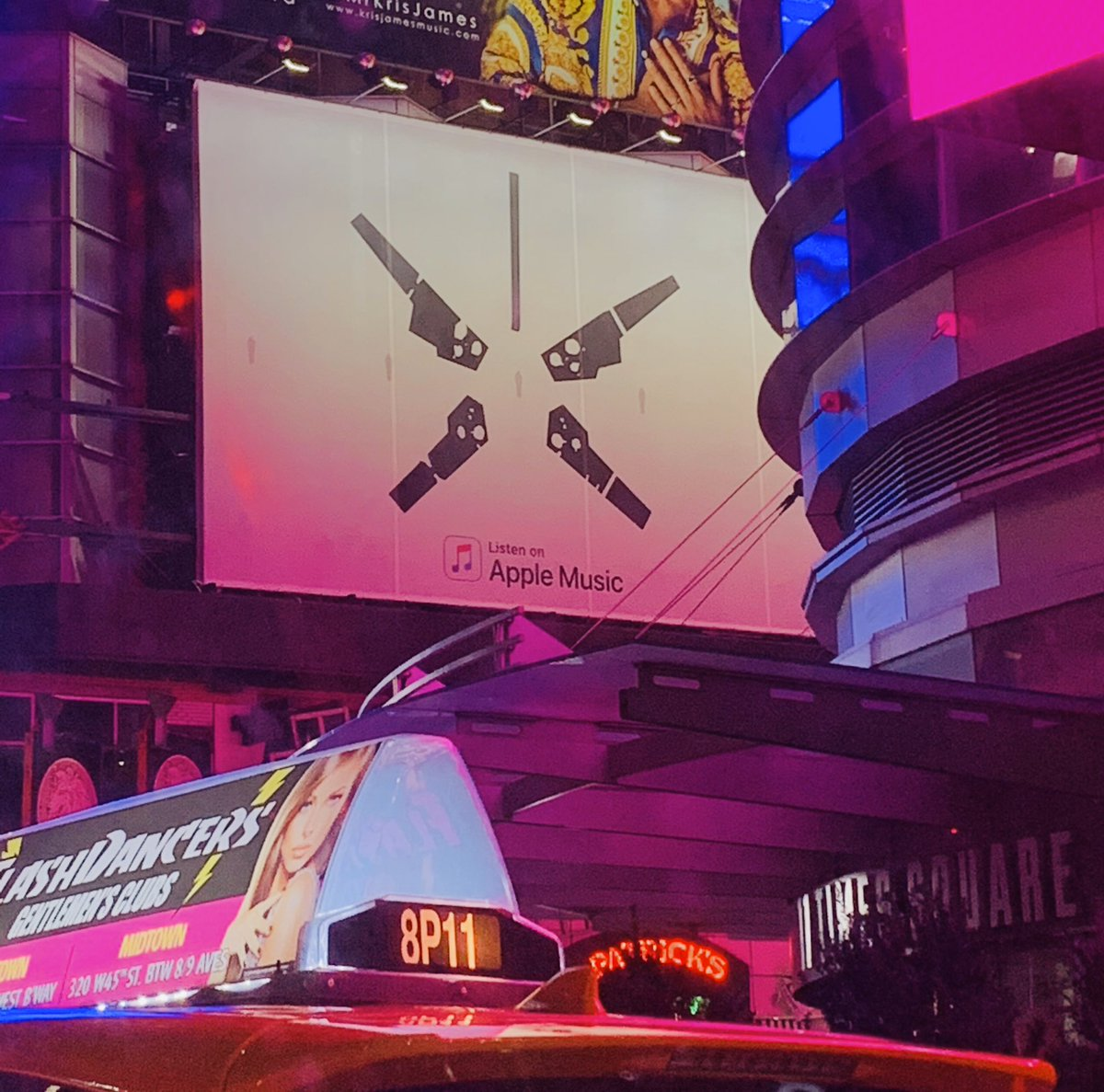
Original album art on display in Times Square

Cover design and packaging was developed in collaboration with Grammy Award-winning artist Annie Stoll who drew inspiration from the William Blake Poem "The Auguries of Innocence" written in 1803 but published in 1863 and featured in the game's trailer.

"To see a World in a Grain of Sand

And a Heaven in a Wild Flower

Hold Infinity in the palm of your hand

And Eternity in an hour"

The campaign promoting the album featured billboards and computer advertisements displaying the album's cover.

== Track listing ==
Track listing adapted from Billboard, credits adapted from Tidal.

| No. | Title | Writer(s) | Artist(s) | Length |
|---|---|---|---|---|
| 1. | "Trigger" | Andrew Wyatt; Bas van Daalen; Jasper Helderman; Khalid Robinson; Philip Meckseper; Thomas Pentz | Major Lazer and Khalid | 2:52 |
| 2. | "Ghost" | Alan Walker; Andrew Frampton; Colton Avery; Fredrick Borch Olsen; Jamie Aura Stenzel; Marcus Ambekk; Max Farrar | Au/Ra and Alan Walker | 2:58 |
| 3. | "Death Stranding" | Iain Cook; Lauren Mayberry; Martin Doherty | Chvrches | 5:16 |
| 4. | "Yellow Box" | Brandon Fried; Danny Parra; Dylan Bauld; Jeremiah Freedman; Jesse James Rutherford; Michael Margott; Zachary Abels | The Neighbourhood | 3:02 |
| 5. | "Meanwhile...In Genova" | Sergio Pizzorno | The S.L.P. | 3:28 |
| 6. | "Ludens" | Oliver Sykes; Jordan Fish | Bring Me the Horizon | 4:38 |
| 7. | "Born in the Slumber" | Cole Randall; Shpresa Lleshaj-Randall | Flora Cash | 3:32 |
| 8. | "Sing to Me" | David Butler; Dwight A. Baker; Matthew Brue | Missio | 3:09 |

== Charts ==
| Chart (2019) | Peak position |
|---|---|
| Finnish Albums (Suomen virallinen lista) | 39 |
