= Music to Listen To... =

Recording by Bring Me the Horizon
- Released: 27 December 2019
- Genre: Electropop; electronica; ambient; experimental; industrial
- Length: 75:35
- Label: Sony; RCA
- Producer: Oli Sykes; Jordan Fish

Bring Me the Horizon chronology
Amo (2019)	Music to Listen To... (2019)	Post Human: Survival Horror (2020)

Music to Listen to~Dance to~Blaze to~Pray to~Feed to~Sleep to~Talk to~Grind to~Trip to~Breathe to~Help to~Hurt to~Scroll to~Roll to~Love to~Hate to~Learn Too~Plot to~Play to~Be to~Feel to~Breed to~Sweat to~Dream to~Hide to~Live to~Die to~Go To (Note: stylised as Music to listen to~dance to~blaze to~pray to~feed to~sleep to~talk to~grind to~trip to~breathe to~help to~hurt to~scroll to~roll to~love to~hate to~learn Too~plot to~play to~be to~feel to~breed to~sweat to~dream to~hide to~live to~die to~GO TO) (often abbreviated to Music to Listen To... or ~Go To~) is a commercial release by British rock band Bring Me the Horizon. It was released on 27 December 2019 without prior announcement. The release was produced by the band's vocalist Oli Sykes and keyboardist Jordan Fish, and features collaborations with several artists including American singer Halsey and British band Yonaka.

Music to Listen To... is the longest musical project by Bring Me the Horizon, and has been referred to as both an extended play and an album by varying sources. The project originated as an idea to use elements from the band's 2019 album Amo and demos they had previously recorded.

== Background ==
Despite being longer than any of the band's studio albums, Music to Listen To... is being marketed as an EP, though other sources have referred to it as an album. The release comes shortly after an interview with vocalist Oliver Sykes in which he discussed plans for more experimental releases, stating "We're not going to do an album again, maybe ever." It was left unannounced until the day of its release, with the band posting "new record out now" on their social media.

Music to Listen To... signalled a continuation of the more collaborative direction explored on Amo, the latter of which included features from Grimes and Dani Filth. Pop singer Halsey is a guest vocalist on the song "¿"; Sykes and Fish had met her when producing her own song "Experiment on Me" for the Birds of Prey film soundtrack. Other featured artists include previous touring mates Yonaka and Lotus Eater, as well as indie pop outfit Happyalone and hip hop artist Bexey.

Describing the process behind the release, Sykes said his first idea was to make "a bit of a study album, or something long, using bits and bobs from what we've got from Amo or demos and stuff like that. When we got together it turned into this whole different thing, and we just rolled with it."

== Composition ==
=== Influences, style and themes ===
In a major departure from the band's previous works, Music to Listen To... largely eschews the use of guitars and traditional song structures. Its style has been described as electropop, electronica, ambient, experimental, and industrial.

=== Recording and repurposing ===
Much of the material on Music to Listen To... was conceived of during the sessions for Amo. Several songs reference or sample material from that album: "Steal Something." contains elements of "I Apologise If You Feel Something", "¿" interpolates lyrics from "In the Dark", and "Why You Gotta Kick Me When I'm Down?" samples portions of "A Devastating Liberation". Sputnikmusic's Simon K. referred to the project as "Essentially [...] a remix EP".

"¿" also features "one of the first things Jordan [Fish] ever wrote for the band", a lead sound used on the Sempiternal track "Can You Feel My Heart". The group sent a demo for the song to Halsey, who wrote her own lyrics and recorded vocals. Sykes and Fish then reworked the song around her performance. Sykes' monologue in "Underground Big {HEADFULOFHYENA}" was recorded with Fish and mixing engineer Dan Lancaster. Sykes was "stoned" and talking with the others when the computer they were recording on crashed, causing the instrumental to create a "hypnotic" loop for several minutes that Sykes recorded over.

== Critical reception ==
Professional ratings
Review scores
Source	Rating
AllMusic	2/5 stars
DIY	3.5/5 stars
NME	4/5 stars
Sputnikmusic	1.5/5 stars

Music to Listen To... received polarised reviews from critics. Some praised its experimentation, whilst others were less keen on the stylistic pivot and criticised its length.

In a four-star review for NME, Ali Shutler called the release a "bold experiment" and described it as an "intense, occasionally confusing listen that definitely won't be for everyone, but [...] never feels like hard work". A less positive review from Sputnikmusic's Simon K. called the album "devoid of compositional structure, narrative and flow" and summarised it as a "drunken joke the band may well regret". AllMusic also criticised the release, stating that "as the tracks bleed one into the next, there isn't much here to grasp onto, outside of big moments that suddenly swell up and devour listeners".

== Track listing ==
Music to Listen To... track listing
No.	Title	Writer(s)	Length
1.	"Steal Something."	Oliver Sykes; Jordan Fish; Simon Dobson; Will Harvey	10:12
2.	"Candy Truck / You Expected: LAB Your Result: Green"	Sykes; Fish	7:15
3.	"A Devastating Liberation"	Sykes; Fish; Dobson	4:40
4.	"¿" (featuring Halsey)	Sykes; Fish; Ashley Frangipane	5:13
5.	"Underground Big {HEADFULOFHYENA}" (featuring Bexey and Lotus Eater)	Sykes; Fish; Baek Ye Jin; Cameron Humphrey; Dan Lancaster; Douglas Park; George Mejer	24:06
6.	"Like Seeing Spiders Running Riot on Your Lover's Grave" (featuring Happyalone)	Sykes; Fish; Fionn Tobin; Paddy Hennessy	6:39
7.	"Dead Dolphin Sounds 'Aid Brain Growth in Unborn Child' Virtual Therapy / Nature Healing 2 Hours" (featuring Alissic)	Sykes; Fish; Lancaster; Alissa Salls	10:10
8.	"Tapes" (featuring Yonaka)	Sykes; Fish; Lancaster; Theresa Jarvis; Alex Crosby	7:18
Total length:			75:35

Notes

- "Like Seeing Spiders Running Riot on Your Lover's Grave" is stylised in all lowercase and in quotation marks.
- "Dead Dolphin Sounds 'Aid Brain Growth in Unborn Child' Virtual Therapy / Nature Healing 2 Hours" is stylised as "Dead Dolphin Sounds 'aid brain growth in unborn child' Virtual Therapy / Nature Healing 2 Hours".
- "Tapes" is stylised as "±ªþ³§".

== Personnel ==
Credits adapted from Tidal.

Bring Me the Horizon

- Oli Sykes – lead vocals (1–3, 5–7), production, engineering, recording
- Jordan Fish – programming (all tracks), background vocals (1, 6, 8), production, engineering, recording
- Lee Malia – guitar (1, 2, 7)
- Matt Kean
- Matt Nicholls

Additional musicians

- Simon Dobson – trumpet (1, 3), fluegelhorn (3)
- William Harvey – viola (1), violin (3)
- Gavin Kibble – cello (3)
- Madilyn Eve Cutter – cello (3)
- Max Ruisi – cello (3)
- Rachael Lander – cello (3)
- Alexander Verster – double bass (3)
- Jessica Price – double bass (3)
- Lewis Reid – double bass (3)
- Oliver Hickie – French horn (3)
- Jane Salmon – trombone (3)
- Ross Anderson – trombone (3)
- Victoria Rule – trumpet (3)
- Anisa Arslanagic – viola (3)
- Benjamin Kaminski – viola (3)
- Mark Gibbs – viola (3)
- Agata Daraskaite – violin (3)
- Elena Abad – violin (3)
- Francesca Gilbert – violin (3)
- James Toll – violin (3)
- Kirsty Mangan – violin (3)
- Magdalena Loth-Hill – violin (3)
- Naomi Burrell – violin (3)
- Olivia Daisy Holland – violin (3)
- Halsey – vocals (4)
- Cameron Humphrey – drums (5)
- Douglas Park – guitar (5)
- Bexey – vocals (5)
- Jamie McLees – vocals (5)
- Fionn Tobin – vocals (6)
- Alissic – vocals (7)
- Theresa Jarvis – vocals (8)

Additional personnel

- Ted Jensen – mastering
- Dan Lancaster – mixing
- Happyalone – additional production (6)
- Alex Crosby – vocal engineering (8)
- Rhys May – assistant engineering (2–8)
- Alissic – artwork

== Charts ==
Chart performance for Music to Listen To...
Chart (2020)	Peak position
Australian Digital Albums (ARIA)	11
Japanese Download Albums (Billboard)	66
UK Album Downloads (OCC)	24
UK Rock & Metal Albums (Official Charts)	17
