= This One's for You (Deez Nuts album) =

Studio album by Deez Nuts
- Released: April 2010
- Recorded: March–April 2010
- Genres: Hardcore punk; rapcore
- Length: 31:18
- Label: Roadrunner
- Producer: Roman Koester

Deez Nuts chronology
| Stay True (2008) | This One's for You (2010) | Bout It! (2013) |

This One's for You is Deez Nuts' second studio album. It was released in April 2010, by Roadrunner Records. All of the instruments and lead vocals were done by JJ Peters, except for a few guest appearances on various tracks. Guest performers on the album are Ben Dunn, Louie Knuxx, Ty Alexander, Stu Callinan, Oli Sykes (Bring Me the Horizon), Jona Weinhofen (I Killed the Prom Queen), Lee Malia (Bring Me the Horizon) and Roman Koester (The Red Shore).

== Track listing ==
All tracks are written by JJ Peters.

| No. | Title | Length |
|---|---|---|
| 1. | "How About Some Hardcore?" | 1:36 |
| 2. | "Don't Call It a Comeback" | 1:15 |
| 3. | "This One's for You" | 3:41 |
| 4. | "Can't Resist" | 2:25 |
| 5. | "DTD" (featuring Ben "Gonz" Dunn) | 3:19 |
| 6. | "Go Veg" | 0:19 |
| 7. | "I Don't Give a Mother Fuck" | 3:46 |
| 8. | "If You Don't Know, Now You Know" (featuring Oliver Sykes of Bring Me the Horizon) | 3:03 |
| 9. | "Pigs Is Pigs" (Grips & Tonic cover) (featuring Louie Knuxx) | 3:17 |
| 10. | "Party Song" | 4:28 |
| 11. | "Free Music" | 4:19 |

== Personnel ==
Deez Nuts

- Roman Koester – bass
- JJ Peters – vocals, guitars, drums
- Ty Alexander – drums
- Stuart Callinan – guitars

Features and additional musicians

- Lee Malia – guitar
- Jona Weinhofen – guitar
- Ben Coyte – backing vocals
- James Hartley – backing vocals
- Joel Hamlin – backing vocals
- Kevin Cameron – backing vocals
- Todd "Louie Knuxx" Williams – backing vocals
- Luke Weber – backing vocals
- Ben Dunn – vocals
- Oliver Sykes – vocals

== Charts ==
| Chart (2010) | Peak position |
|---|---|
| Australian Albums (ARIA Charts) | 44 |
