= Post Human: Survival Horror =

2020 recording by Bring Me the Horizon

Recording by Bring Me the Horizon
- Released: 30 October 2020
- Recorded: 2019–2020
- Studios: Casa do Syko (United Kingdom); MDDN (Los Angeles); DDM (Hastings); Fonoprint (Bologna)
- Genres: Alternative metal; metalcore; nu metal; industrial metal; electronic rock; hard rock
- Length: 32:10
- Labels: Sony; RCA
- Producers: Jordan Fish; Oli Sykes

Bring Me the Horizon chronology
Music to Listen To... (2019)	Post Human: Survival Horror (2020)	Post Human: Nex Gen (2024)

Singles from Post Human: Survival Horror
- 1. "Ludens" Released: 6 November 2019; 2. "Parasite Eve" Released: 25 June 2020; 3. "Obey" Released: 2 September 2020; 4. "Teardrops" Released: 22 October 2020

Post Human: Survival Horror is a commercial release (Note: variously referred to as an album or an EP) by British rock band Bring Me the Horizon. It was released on 30 October 2020 and is intended to be the first in a series of four projects to be released by the band under the Post Human name. The release was produced by frontman Oli Sykes and keyboardist Jordan Fish, with additional production from composer Mick Gordon. Stylistically, the release marks return to the heavier and more aggressive metalcore sound of the band's earlier material.

The release was preceded by four singles: "Ludens", which was also previously released as a single on the Timefall soundtrack for Death Stranding, "Parasite Eve", "Obey", and "Teardrops". The release received generally positive reviews from critics and became the band's second UK number one release. The second Post Human installment, Post Human: Nex Gen, originally set to be released on 15 September 2023 was delayed until it was released on 24 May 2024. The lengthy delay came as a result of "unforeseeable circumstances" that left the band being unable to complete the record in time.

== Background and recording ==
On 20 March 2020, the band announced that they were in a home studio, writing and recording material for their eighth record, which was expected to be an extended play (EP), with part of it being co-produced by video game composer Mick Gordon. After playing the video game Doom Eternal during the COVID-19 lockdowns and being inspired by Gordon's soundtrack for the game, lead vocalist Oliver Sykes contacted Gordon to help produce the song "Parasite Eve" and the release as a whole. In August 2020, the band's keyboardist Jordan Fish teased that the band was planning on releasing a series of releases. Speaking about the releases, Fish stated:

"When we get into the other EPs, it'll give us a chance to maybe get some other people on who are a bit more left-field or a bit more out of the box for our band."

The band's lead vocalist Sykes also stated that they would be releasing four EPs under the "Post Human" name, stating:

"They'll each be totally different with their own sound and mood," he said. "That's one thing we've never really done. There's often been an over-arching theme on our records, but the music has always felt like a collage. That's cool and I like it, but sometimes you want a soundtrack for a certain occasion and emotion."

On 2 November 2020, Fish explained in an interview he got the terminology of the record wrong, because it was not supposed to end up with nine tracks on it, revealing:

"I didn't think it was going to be nine tracks. I guess EP, we probably used the wrong terminology in the first place, I don't think we should have maybe said EP..."

While Sykes was quarantined during the COVID-19 lockdowns in 2020, he frequently listened to rock duo Nova Twins. Members Amy Love and Georgia South had also quarantined separately following the cancellation of their shows in March 2020. Some time after, the duo were contacted by Jason Aalon Butler—owner of Nova Twins' label 333 Wreckords—who told them that Sykes and Fish wanted to talk to them. The following day, Sykes messaged them on Instagram and sent an unfinished version of "1x1". As Sykes needed the track finished within the week, Nova Twins recorded and returned their parts in two days, with South adding "a few weird bass noises on there".

== Composition ==
=== Lyrics and themes ===
Sykes stated that the songs were written to cope with the COVID-19 pandemic.

In an interview with NME, Sykes revealed a lot of background information about Post Human: Survival Horror. "Dear Diary", the introductory song, was originally called "Survival Horror", and he wanted the song to be "fast and punky", as well as lyrically being about going into isolation and lockdown. Sykes expressed how he felt it made him feel like it was a zombie apocalypse, with all of those feelings being written down into a diary to represent about how everyone feels being forced into isolation from society in an arising pandemic.

"Parasite Eve" was originally written about a Japanese virus that Sykes had read about, and how he thought a huge virus could impact the future. He would end up being shocked when COVID-19 arose, since he never thought something like that would happen so soon. The band went back and forth on thinking whether or not it was a good idea to release the song, as they felt it might have been "too offensive", before ultimately deciding to release the song with altered lyrics; for example: "When we forget the infection, will we remember the lesson?" was originally: "If we survive the infection." They eventually released "Parasite Eve", with the reasoning that people need a song like it, even if it is dark. The overall sound and themes of "Parasite Eve" would end up dictating the direction for the rest of the record.

Sykes also explained how "Teardrops" is about the "bad news" people have been fed over the course of the past year, and how he put into perspective how bad everything is, citing the murder of George Floyd. He elaborated that it is easy to get numb to bad news, since there is so much of it overwhelming everyone, having a massive detrimental effect on mental health, because we do not react the way we should towards things as a direct consequence of this. Sykes's perspective on everything plays a vital role in what "Teardrops" means to him and his reflection towards society.

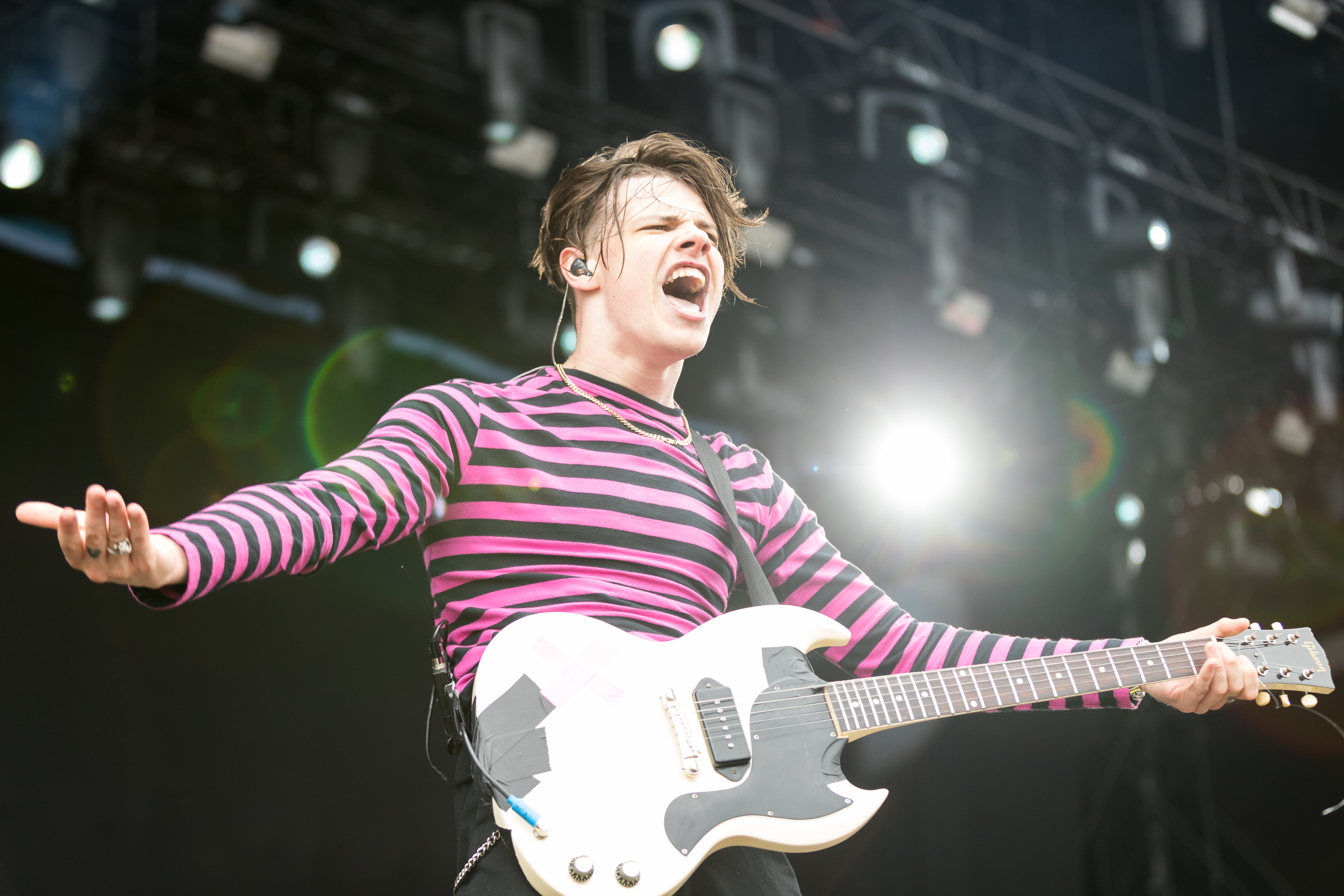
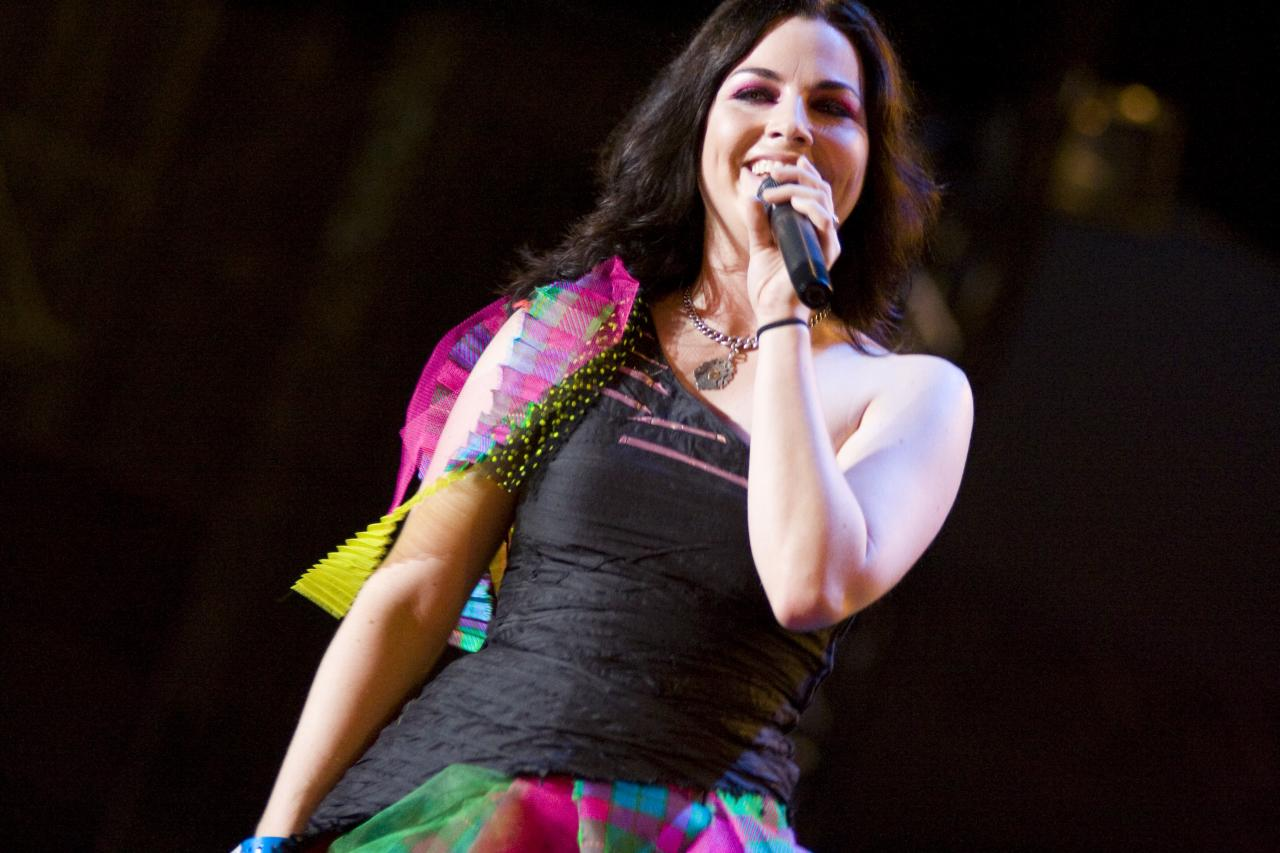
Yungblud (top; 2018; age 20) and Amy Lee of Evanescence (bottom; 2009; age 27) both feature on the record.

"Obey" was written about how people are told to co-operate with the status quo, particularly politically and socially, instead of demanding better. He would express how fear forces us to accept the way things are and how we just obey the system. The song was written from the perspective of the oppressor towards the people being oppressed, citing the example of a warning given by then US president Donald Trump to anti-racist protestors in the wake of the murder of George Floyd. The collaboration with Yungblud started when the band's keyboardist, songwriter, and producer Jordan Fish had the suggestion to get Yungblud on the track as that's what he felt the song needed.

Sykes did not have much to say about "Itch for the Cure (When Will We Be Free?)", although he stated how the themes of the song were directly tied and linked to the follow-up on the record "Kingslayer", featuring Babymetal. The song title for "Itch for the Cure (When Will We Be Free?)" would be a confirmed reference and nod to "Cure for the Itch" off of Linkin Park's Hybrid Theory.

Sykes went on to say about how the idea of "Kingslayer" originally came about when he was playing Call of Duty in Amsterdam, and the "Kingslayer" is what everyone wants to be. He used the idea as an analogy for the idea of then US president Donald Trump condemning ANTIFA as a "terrorist organisation" and the Extinction Rebellion causing chaos, as he felt that people have to go out and do what they feel is right, no matter the cost. Hence the themes and for "Kingslayer" to break the barriers of the reality. Sykes would go on to compare the sound of the song to something off their second studio album Suicide Season, and how the cute vocals of Babymetal on the chorus would make for a perfect contrast on "Kingslayer".

Sykes said that "1x1" was written about "the guilt that we as a society carry for what we've done to other species and ethnicities and other genders", while also taking inspiration from his past history and struggles with drug addiction, citing it as the most personal song on the record to him.

"One Day the Only Butterflies Left Will Be in Your Chest as You March Towards Your Death" features Evanescence vocalist Amy Lee. The song is superficially about a relationship, but the hidden meaning is actually about the relationship between humans and mother nature, which Sykes has described as "abusive".

=== Influences and style ===
Musically, Post Human: Survival Horror has been described by critics as alternative metal, metalcore, electronic rock, nu metal, industrial metal, hard rock, electronica, EDM, and trancecore. The album is culturally cited as playing a significant role in solidifying the emerging nu metal revival movement of the late 2010s within the alternative music scene. Wall of Sound noted "thrash metal inspired riffs" on the song "Dear Diary,". They also compared the song "Teardrops" to Linkin Park and called it a nu metal track. According to The Independent, the song "Kingslayer" "employs thrash and screamo for a nightmare rave..." The song features Japanese metal band Babymetal. During an interview, Fish and Lee Malia revealed that Babymetal originally recorded their parts in English before Sykes asked them to re-record in Japanese.

== Promotion and release ==
On 6 November 2019, the band released a new song titled "Ludens". It was released as the first single off the record and was also part of Death Stranding: Timefall, along with the news that the band are not planning to release an album again and instead wanted to release EPs in the future. On 25 June 2020, the band released the second single "Parasite Eve" along with a music video. It was expected to be released on 10 June 2020, but due to the George Floyd protests and the Black Lives Matter movement, the song was postponed to 25 June. That same day, the band also announced a new project that they have been working on titled Post Human which they said to be four EPs released throughout the next year which when combined would make an album.

On 2 September, the band released the third single, "Obey" in collaboration with English singer Yungblud with its corresponding music video. On 14 October, the band officially announced through social media that Post Human: Survival Horror was set for release on 30 October 2020. The band announced a 2021 UK arena tour in support of the release. On 22 October, a week before the release date, the fourth single "Teardrops" was released alongside an accompanying music video.

== Reception ==
=== Critical reception ===
Professional ratings
Aggregate scores
Source	Rating
AnyDecentMusic?	6.9/10
Metacritic	82/100
Review scores
Source	Rating
AllMusic	3.5/5 stars
Clash	7/10
Gigwise	8/10 stars
The Independent	4/5 stars
Kerrang!	4/5
The Line of Best Fit	7.5/10
NME	4/5 stars
Sputnikmusic	2.7/5
The Times	2/5 stars
Wall of Sound	8.5/10

Post Human: Survival Horror received generally positive reviews from critics. At Metacritic, which assigns a normalised rating out of 100 to reviews from mainstream critics, the album has an average score of 82 out of 100, which indicates "universal acclaim" based on 8 reviews. Josh Gray of Clash was positive towards the release stating, "as indicated by its title, track names...this record boasts some serious Big Video Game Energy, elevated by the presence of Doom...composer Mick Gordon. Gordon helps the band inject some high-octane ferocity back into their music, and tracks like 'Obey' and 'Ludens' sound huge when paired with the rattle of your bullets mowing down wave after wave of aliens/zombies/Animal Crossing villagers." Wall of Sound praised the release saying it: "After years of going softer with their sound, trying new things to prove their worth, Bring Me The Horizon will surprise even the biggest of critic with Post Human: Survival Horror. It has a touch of everything they've been producing over the past decade and really cements them as one of the world's best rock bands getting about today."

Laviea Thomas of Gigwise was positive towards the release and felt that the release "[harnessed] their roots, whilst still keeping it fresh." Andrew Trendell of NME was positive towards the release and stated that some of the songs "[have the] pure aggression [that] harks back to the heavier vibes of 2008's Suicide Season and 2010's There Is a Hell..." Nick Ruskell of Kerrang! considered the release to be "cathartic" and "heavy" and that the release has [elements] of the familiar in amongst the creativity. Neil Z. Yeung of AllMusic praised the release stating "Survival Horror is one of the band's best distillations of their extremes, providing just enough brutality without sacrificing their evolving vision of how melodic and experimental a metal band can be."

The Independent was also positive towards the release, calling it "...a soundtrack fit for the end of the world." Callum Foulds of The Line of Best Fit stated that "...[the release captures] the bewildering phenomenon that is living through a worldwide pandemic." Sputnikmusic was less positive stating "Post Human: Survival Horror...[is] the sonic equivalent to fast food, by which you'll consume it, enjoy it, and forget about it right after you've finished it, but it's fun while it lasts.

=== Accolades ===
Accolades for Post Human: Survival Horror
Publication	Accolade	Rank	Ref.
Alternative Press	Alternative Press's 50 best albums of 2020	—	
Exclaim!	Exclaim!'s 25 best EPs of 2020	—	
Kerrang!	Kerrang!'s 10 best EPs of 2020	1	
NME	NME's 20 best EPs and Mixtapes of 2020	—	
Punktastic	Punktastic's Top 25 albums of 2020	14	
Revolver	Revolver's 25 best albums of 2020	7	
Riff Magazine	Riff Magazine's 75 best albums of 2020	33	

== Commercial performance ==
Post Human: Survival Horror debuted and peaked in the top 40 in over 15 countries worldwide, including top 10 peaks in Australia, Austria, Finland, Germany, Portugal and Switzerland.

In their home country, Post Human: Survival Horror debuted at number five on the UK Albums Chart and number two on the UK Rock & Metal Albums Chart purely on digital formats, selling 3,767 downloads and 5,287 streaming units accumulating a total of 9,024 album equivalent units. Upon being released on physical formats, the record re-entered atop the UK Albums Chart, claiming the band their second UK number one by beating Bicep's Isles to the top spot by selling 14,904 copies after trailing at number two in the midweek update. In the process, it became the first record in nearly 30 years to re-enter atop the charts since Oleta Adams' Circle of One became the first to do so. In July 2021, the British Phonographic Industry certified Post Human: Survival Horror as Silver for 60,000 units and later got certified Gold for 100,000 units in January 2023.

In the United States, the record debuted at number 46 with 14,000 total units (5,225 downloads), becoming the band's first since Suicide Season (2008) to not debut inside the top 40 on the US Billboard 200. It however peaked inside the top 10 at number eight, four and three respectively on the Top Rock Albums, Top Alternative Albums and Top Hard Rock Albums charts. Upon its physical release, Post Human: Survival Horror re-entered the US Billboard 200 at number 171 with 4,225 copies sold.

== Track listing ==
Post Human: Survival Horror track listing
No.	Title	Writer(s)	Length
1.	"Dear Diary,"	Oli Sykes; Jordan Fish; Lee Malia; Matthew Kean; Matthew Nicholls	2:44
2.	"Parasite Eve"	Sykes; Fish; Malia; Kean; Nicholls; Petar Lyondev^{[a]}	4:51
3.	"Teardrops"	Sykes; Fish	3:35
4.	"Obey" (with Yungblud)	Sykes; Fish; Dominic Harrison	3:40
5.	"Itch for the Cure (When Will We Be Free?)"	Sykes; Fish	1:26
6.	"Kingslayer" (featuring Babymetal)	Sykes; Fish; Mk-metal	3:38
7.	"1x1" (featuring Nova Twins)	Sykes; Fish; Amy Love; Georgia South	3:29
8.	"Ludens"	Sykes; Fish	4:40
9.	"One Day the Only Butterflies Left Will Be in Your Chest as You March Towards Your Death" (featuring Amy Lee)	Sykes; Fish; Amy Lee	4:03
Total length:			32:10

Japanese edition bonus tracks
No.	Title	Writer(s)	Length
10.	"Mantra" (live in Tokyo)	Sykes; Fish; Malia; Kean; Nicholls	4:23
11.	"Medicine" (live in Tokyo)	Sykes; Fish; Malia; Kean; Nicholls	3:50
12.	"Ludens" (live in Tokyo)		5:58
Total length:			46:22

Notes

- ^{^[a]} "Parasite Eve" contains a sample of "Erghen Diado", written by Petar Lyondev and performed by the Bulgarian Female Vocal Choir.
- "Parasite Eve" and "Ludens" are remixed and remastered on the physical edition of the album, while on the digital version, the single versions of the songs are used.

== Personnel ==
Credits adapted from the album's liner notes.

Bring Me the Horizon

- Oli Sykes – lead vocals, production (all tracks), engineering (1–7, 9)
- Lee Malia – guitar (1–8)
- Jordan Fish – programming, production (all tracks), backing vocals (1–7, 9), piano (9), engineering (1–7, 9), vocal engineering (8)
- Matt Kean – bass (1–8)
- Matt Nicholls – drums (1–8)

Additional musicians

- Mick Gordon – additional synthesizers, additional percussion, additional production (1, 2, 4–6, 9)
- Toriel – backing vocals (2)
- Yungblud – vocals (4)
- Sam Winfield – gang vocals (4)
- Tom Millar – gang vocals (4)
- Giles Stelfox – gang vocals (4)
- Luke Burywood – gang vocals (4)
- Clayton Deakin – gang vocals (4)
- Jordan Baggs – gang vocals (4)
- Babymetal – vocals (6)
- Amy Love – vocals (7)
- Georgia South – additional bass (7)
- Amy Lee – vocals, background vocals (9)

Additional personnel

- Chris Athens – mastering (all tracks; except 2, 8 on digital version)
- Zakk Cervini – mixing (all tracks; except 2, 8 on digital version), Yungblud recording and engineering (4)
- Carl Bown – drums recording (4)
- Vyacheslav Rychkov – drums recording (5)
- Dan Lancaster – drums engineering (8), mixing (2, 8; digital version only)
- Ted Jensen – mastering (2, 8; digital version only)
- Watametal – Babymetal recording and engineering (6)
- Ben Beetham – Nova Twins recording and engineering (7)
- Phil Gornell – assistant engineering (8)
- Claudio Adamo – assistant engineering (8)
- Alissic – artwork

== Charts ==
=== Weekly charts ===
Weekly chart performance for Post Human: Survival Horror
Chart (2020–2021)	Peak position
Australian Albums (ARIA)	3
Austrian Albums (Ö3 Austria)	7
Belgian Albums (Ultratop Flanders)	18
Belgian Albums (Ultratop Wallonia)	64
Canadian Albums (Billboard)	31
Dutch Albums (Album Top 100)	41
Finnish Albums (Suomen virallinen lista)	7
French Albums (SNEP)	71
German Albums (Offizielle Top 100)	4
Irish Albums (Official Charts)	31
Italian Albums (FIMI)	45
Japanese Albums (Oricon)	16
Japanese Hot Albums (Billboard)	21
New Zealand Albums (RMNZ)	19
Norwegian Albums (VG-lista)	28
Polish Albums (ZPAV)	11
Portuguese Albums (AFP)	4
Scottish Albums (Official Charts)	1
Spanish Albums (Promusicae)	28
Swedish Albums (Sverigetopplistan)	28
Swiss Albums (Schweizer Hitparade)	6
UK Albums (Official Charts)	1
UK Rock & Metal Albums (Official Charts)	1
US Billboard 200	46
US Top Alternative Albums (Billboard)	4
US Top Hard Rock Albums (Billboard)	3
US Top Rock Albums (Billboard)	8

=== Year-end charts ===
Year-end chart performance for Post Human: Survival Horror
Chart (2021)	Position
UK Cassette Albums (OCC)	23

== Certifications ==
Certifications for Post Human: Survival Horror
Region	Certification	Certified units/sales
Poland (ZPAV)	Gold	10,000^{‡}
United Kingdom (BPI)	Gold	100,000^{‡}
^{‡} Sales+streaming figures based on certification alone.

== Release history ==
Release history and formats for Post Human: Survival Horror
Region	Date	Format	Label	Ref.
Various	30 October 2020	Digital download; streaming	Sony; RCA	
Various	22 January 2021	CD; vinyl; cassette	Sony; RCA	
