= Bout It! =

Studio album by Deez Nuts
- Released: 8 April 2013
- Genre: Hardcore punk; rap metal
- Length: 31:46
- Label: Century Media; EMI; UNFD

Deez Nuts chronology
This One's for You (2010)	Bout It! (2013)	Word Is Bond (2015)

Professional ratings
Review scores
Source	Rating
AllMusic	3.5/5 stars
Impericon	5/6

Bout It! is the third studio album by the hardcore punk band Deez Nuts. It was released on 8 April 2013 through Century Media. AllMusic wrote that the album was mainly hardcore punk, edging on metalcore.

== Track listing ==
Bout It! track listing
No.	Title	Length
1.	"Bout It"	3:12
2.	"Shot After Shot"	3:21
3.	"Not a Face in the Crowd" (featuring Freddy Cricien of Madball)	2:42
4.	"Keep On"	2:00
5.	"Popular Demand"	2:59
6.	"Go Fuck Yourself" (featuring Lord Ezec aka. Danny Diablo)	2:37
7.	"Don't Act Like You Don't Already Know"	1:05
8.	"What We Eat Don't Make You Shit"	1:20
9.	"Call to Arms"	0:14
10.	"Streets Are Watching" (featuring Jonathan Blake of On Broken Wings and Mark Heylmun of Suicide Silence)	2:59
11.	"Public Service Announcement" (featuring Hoya Roc of Madball)	0:16
12.	"Unfuckwithable" (featuring Sean Murphy of Verse and Wayne Lozinak of Hatebreed)	2:21
13.	"I.D.K.W.Y.T.Y.A.B.I.K.W.D.G.A.F.A.Y." ("I Don't Know Who You Think You Are; But, I Know We Don't Give a Fuck About You")	0:04
14.	"Life You Live"	3:01
15.	"True Colors"	0:19
16.	"Band of Brothers" (featuring Sam Carter of Architects)	3:16
Total length:		31:46

== Charts ==
Chart performance for Bout It!
Chart (2013)	Peak position
Australian Albums (ARIA)	35
German Albums (Offizielle Top 100)	76
