= Stay True (album) =

Studio album by Deez Nuts
- Released: October 4, 2008
- Recorded: August 11–19, 2008
- Genres: Hardcore punk; rapcore
- Length: 38:26
- Label: Stomp Entertainment
- Producer: JJ Peters

Deez Nuts chronology
Rep Your Hood (2007)	Stay True (2008)	This One's for You (2010)

Stay True is the debut album by Deez Nuts. It was released on October 4, 2008, by Stomp Entertainment. All of the album's instruments and lead vocals were done by JJ Peters. Guest vocals performed by Jamie Hope of ex-The Red Shore, Joel Birch and Ahren Stringer of The Amity Affliction, and Louie Knuxx.

== Track listing ==
All tracks are written by JJ Peters.

No.	Title	Length
1.	"Stay True"	3:24
2.	"Damn Right"	3:00
3.	"Love. Hate." (featuring Jamie Hope)	3:24
4.	"Fuck What You Think"	0:34
5.	"I Hustle Everyday"	3:58
6.	"It's Like That, and That's the Way It Is"	2:18
7.	"Tonight We're Gonna Party..." (skit)	2:15
8.	"Like There's No Tomorrow" (featuring Joel Birch)	2:44
9.	"Your Mother Should've Swallowed You"	3:14
10.	"Move Back" (featuring Louie Knuxx)	3:30
11.	"Never Grow Up"	3:21
12.	"F.T.W."	3:31
13.	"Fight for Your Right" (Beastie Boys cover)	3:13

== Credits ==
- JJ Peters – vocals, guitar, bass, drums
- Joel Birch – backing vocals
- Jamie Hope – backing vocals
- Ahren Stringer – backing vocals
- Todd "Louie Knuxx" Williams – backing vocals
- Roman Koester – bass guitar and mix and master
- Tim Bates - bass guitar and Recording engineer

== Charts ==
Chart (2008)	Peak position
Australian Albums (ARIA Charts)	80
