= Parasite Eve (song) =

2020 single by Bring Me the Horizon

Single by Bring Me the Horizon

from the album Post Human: Survival Horror
- Released: 25 June 2020
- Recorded: 2020
- Studio: Casa do Syko (United Kingdom)
- Genre: Nu metal; electronic rock
- Length: 4:51
- Label: Sony; RCA
- Songwriters: Oliver Sykes; Jordan Fish; Lee Malia; Matt Kean; Matt Nicholls; Petar Lyondev
- Producers: Oliver Sykes; Jordan Fish

Bring Me the Horizon singles chronology
| "Ludens" (2019) | "Parasite Eve" (2020) | "Obey" (2020) |

Audio sample
- file; help

Music video
- "Parasite Eve" on YouTube

"Parasite Eve" is a song by British rock band Bring Me the Horizon. Produced by the band's vocalist Oliver Sykes and keyboardist Jordan Fish and written by the entire band, it was released as the second single from the group's 2020 commercial release Post Human: Survival Horror on 25 June 2020. The song samples "Erghen Diado" written by Petar Lyondev and performed by the Bulgarian Female Vocal Choir; Lyondev is credited as a co-writer.

"Parasite Eve" is the band's second top 20 hit single on the Scottish Singles Chart.

== Promotion and release ==
The track was teased by Oliver Sykes on Instagram. It was expected to be released on 10 June 2020, but due to the George Floyd protests and the Black Lives Matter movement, the song was postponed to 25 June.

== Composition and lyrics ==
"Parasite Eve" has been described as a nu metal and electronic rock song with some elements of electropop. The song was inspired by the Japanese video game of the same name. It was written and composed by the band while in quarantining during the COVID-19 pandemic. The song samples "Erghen Diado" from the album Le Mystère des Voix Bulgares. The lyrics talk about what is happening during the pandemic, saying that "This is a war" between countries for discovering a vaccine. At the same time, Sykes talks about when the pandemic is overcome, while asking "When we forget the Infection, will we remember the lesson?" to the people and the world leaders like U.S. President Donald Trump and Brazil President Jair Bolsonaro that rejected and ignored the gravity of the virus. Musically, it was influenced a lot by Sykes playing the game Doom Eternal, as well as the contributions of the game soundtrack artist Mick Gordon, giving it a futuristic and cyber overlay. Sykes said about the lyrics of the song amid the similarity of the current world situation:

"It was really weird, we'd heard about the pandemic in China, but then the similarities between what we were writing about started to become closer to reality. Every time there was a news story about it, we'd turn to each other and say 'Parasite Eve', not realising the magnitude of it all. We shelved the song for a bit because it felt bit too close to the bone. After sitting on it for a while, we realised that this was a reason to release it now more than ever. In our music we've always wanted to escape, but there's been too much escapism and ignoring the problems in the world. It's not what the world needs. The world needs more and needs to think about it and remember. You can't just brush over it and expect life to go back to normal, because it fucking ain't. In so many ways, we need to change. That's what rock music is about – addressing the dark side and processing it..."

== Music video ==
The music video for "Parasite Eve" was released on the same day as the single was streamed. Directed by Sykes himself, he took inspiration from some of his favorite video games, films and the genre of nu metal. Using masks a friend of his created, each member filmed their video parts separately. This was an effort to stay within the social distancing restrictions set in place. Due to the lockdown restrictions, the band filmed the video with minimal crew and minimal resources.

== Charts ==
=== Weekly charts ===
Weekly chart performance for "Parasite Eve"
| Chart (2020) | Peak position |
|---|---|
| Australia (ARIA) | 82 |
| Canada Digital Songs (Billboard) | 46 |
| Czech Republic Singles Digital (ČNS IFPI) | 48 |
| France (SNEP Sales Chart) | 57 |
| Germany (Deutsche Single Trend Charts) | 4 |
| Hungary (Single Top 40) | 7 |
| New Zealand Hot Singles (RMNZ) | 13 |
| Scottish Singles Sales (Official Charts) | 17 |
| UK Singles (Official Charts) | 28 |
| UK Rock & Metal (Official Charts) | 1 |
| US Digital Song Sales (Billboard) | 27 |
| US Hot Rock & Alternative Songs (Billboard) | 10 |

=== Year-end charts ===
Year-end chart performance for "Parasite Eve"
| Chart (2021) | Position |
|---|---|
| US Hot Hard Rock Songs (Billboard) | 31 |

== Certifications ==
Certifications for "Parasite Eve"
| Region | Certification | Certified units/sales |
|---|---|---|
| Australia (ARIA) | Gold | 35,000^{‡} |
| Brazil (Pro-Música Brasil) | Gold | 20,000^{‡} |
| United Kingdom (BPI) | Silver | 200,000^{‡} |
| United States (RIAA) | Gold | 500,000^{‡} |
^{‡} Sales+streaming figures based on certification alone.
