= Oli Sykes =

British singer (born 1986)

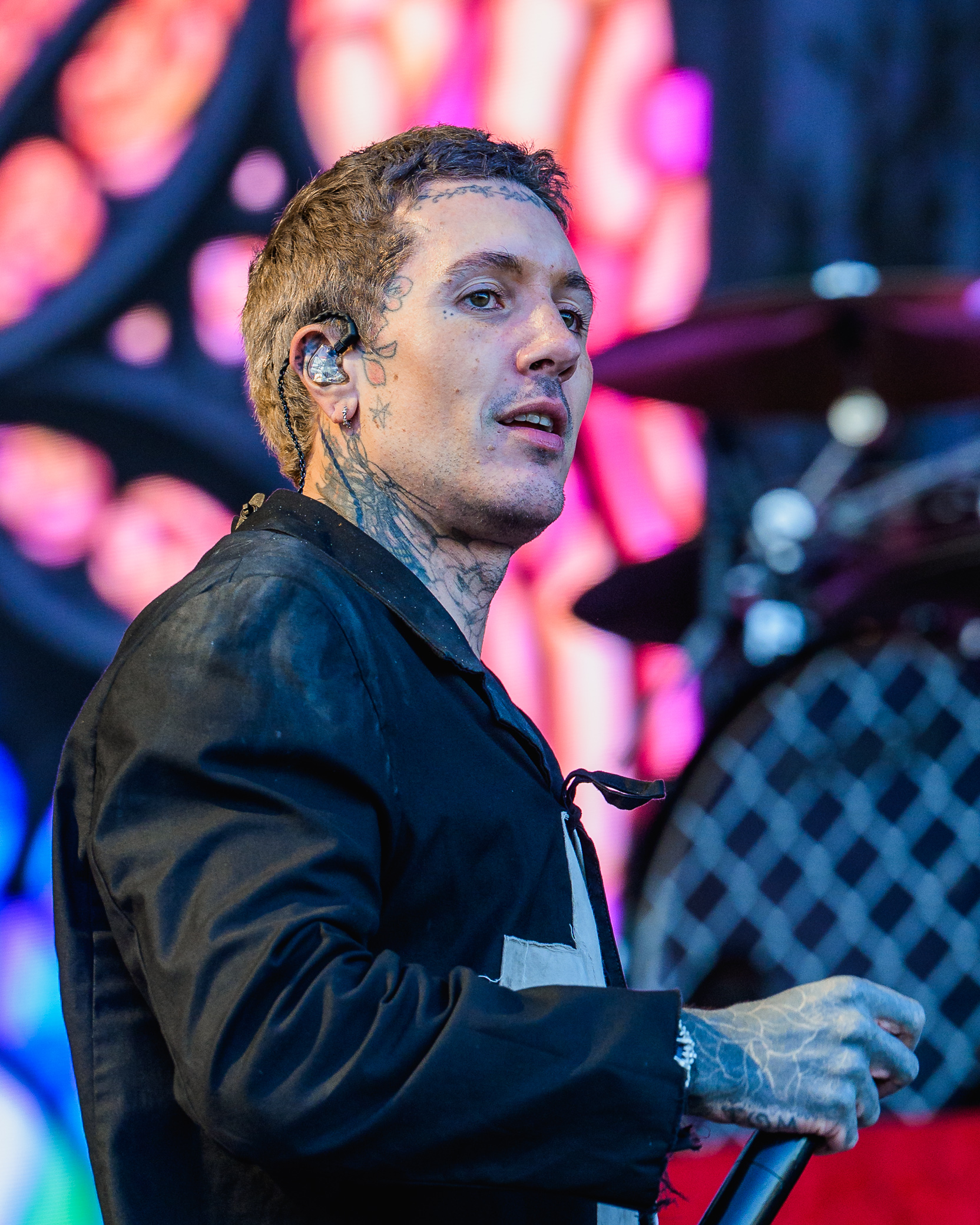
- Sykes with Bring Me the Horizon at Tons of Rock 2026
- Born: Oliver Scott Sykes; 20 November 1986 (age 39); Ashford, Kent, England
- Citizenship: United Kingdom; Australia (Note: Sykes spent many years during his young childhood in Australia. When brought up in an interview with The Project in 2022, Sykes confirmed he had an Australian passport.); Brazil
- Occupations: Singer; songwriter; businessman; record producer
- Years active: 2000–present
- Spouses: Hannah Pixie Snowdon (m. 2015; div. 2016) Alissa Salls (m. 2017)
- Children: 2
- Musical career
- Origin: Sheffield, South Yorkshire, England
- Genres: Metalcore; alternative metal; alternative rock; post-hardcore; electronic rock; pop rock; hard rock; deathcore
- Instruments: Vocals; keyboards
- Member of: Bring Me the Horizon

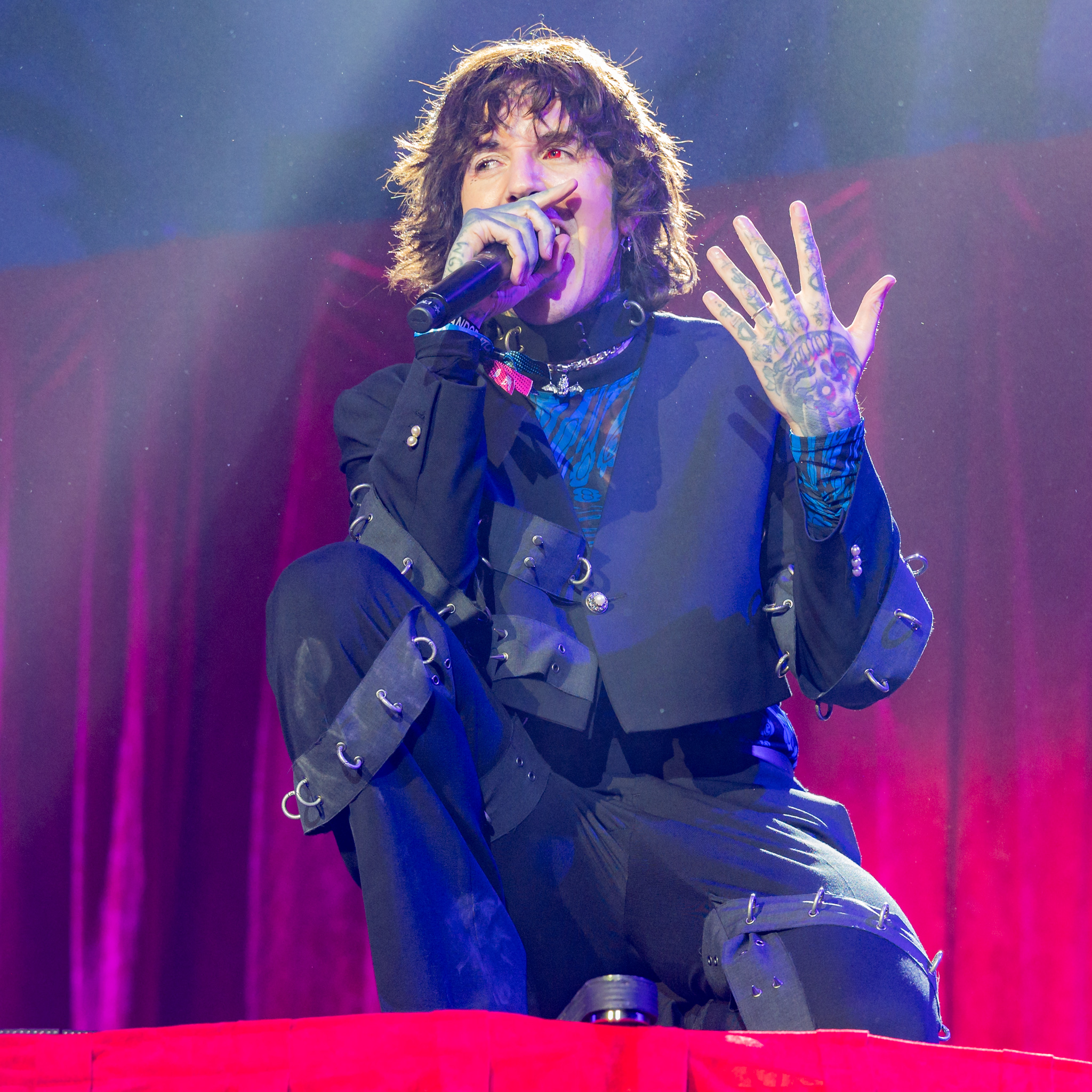
Sykes with Bring Me the Horizon at Rock im Park 2023

Oliver Scott Sykes (born 20 November 1986) is an English musician, and the lead vocalist and primary lyricist of the rock band Bring Me the Horizon. He founded apparel company Drop Dead Clothing and opened a vegan bar and restaurant in Sheffield.

== Early life ==
Sykes was born on 20 November 1986, in Ashford, Kent, England. As an infant, he moved to Australia with his parents, Ian and Carol Sykes, living between Adelaide and Perth during a period of about six years. The family returned to the United Kingdom when Sykes was about eight, settling in Sheffield, South Yorkshire. As a teenager, he attended Stocksbridge High School then Barnsley College.

== Career ==
=== Womb 2 Da Tomb, Purple Curto and Olisaurus pseudonym (2000–2004) ===
In early 2000, while still in school, he began crafting compilation CDs and short tracks under the name Quakebeat. He also played in the mock hip-hop band "Womb 2 Da Tomb" with his brother Tom Sykes and fellow Bring Me the Horizon member Matt Nicholls, and in metal band "Purple Curto" with Neil Whiteley, as the drummer/vocalist under the pseudonym "Olisaurus", which he would later use when releasing solo material.

=== Bring Me the Horizon (2004–present) ===
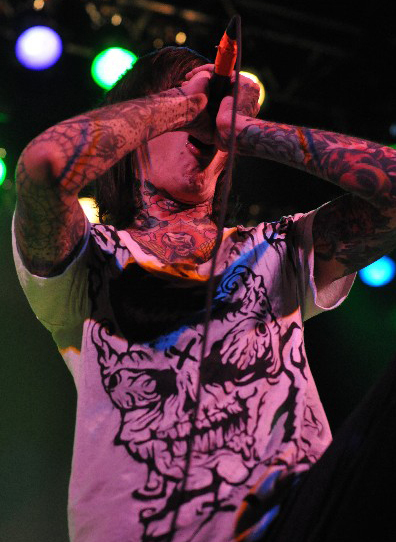
Sykes performing in 2008

In 2004, Sykes formed Bring Me the Horizon. The band released their debut EP This Is What the Edge of Your Seat Was Made For in 2004, then releasing their debut studio album, Count Your Blessings in 2006.

Their second studio album, Suicide Season, was released on 29 September 2008. During a tour in 2008, Bring Me the Horizon and the British metalcore band Architects filmed two videos. The first showed a fight between Sykes and Architects' lead singer Sam Carter, while the second showed an ambulance with Sykes supposedly inside. The videos were uploaded to YouTube, leading to outrage from many Bring Me the Horizon fans, and resulting in hate mail and death threats being sent to Carter. However, it was later revealed that the videos were a stunt staged by both bands, and that they are in fact good friends. Sykes said, "All-day events can get boring very fast so we conjured up the first idiotic thing we could think of and made it as unbelievable as possible."

Their third studio album There Is a Hell Believe Me I've Seen It. There Is a Heaven Let's Keep It a Secret. was released on 4 October 2010, followed by fourth studio album Sempiternal on 1 April 2013, which features the new member Jordan Fish for the album. In June 2013, Sykes and Bring Me the Horizon were sued by the parents of a 12-year-old girl due to injuries received in the mosh pit while watching the band's performance during the Warped Tour 2013. This led to Sykes announcing via Twitter that legally he was no longer able to start any form of moshing activities during his concerts. However, Sykes later stated that the suit had been dropped and that moshing was not going to be banned.

The band released their fifth studio album That's the Spirit on 11 September 2015, and their sixth album Amo on 25 January 2019. On 27 December 2019, they released their commercial release Music to Listen To.... On 30 October 2020, they released another commercial release, Post Human: Survival Horror.

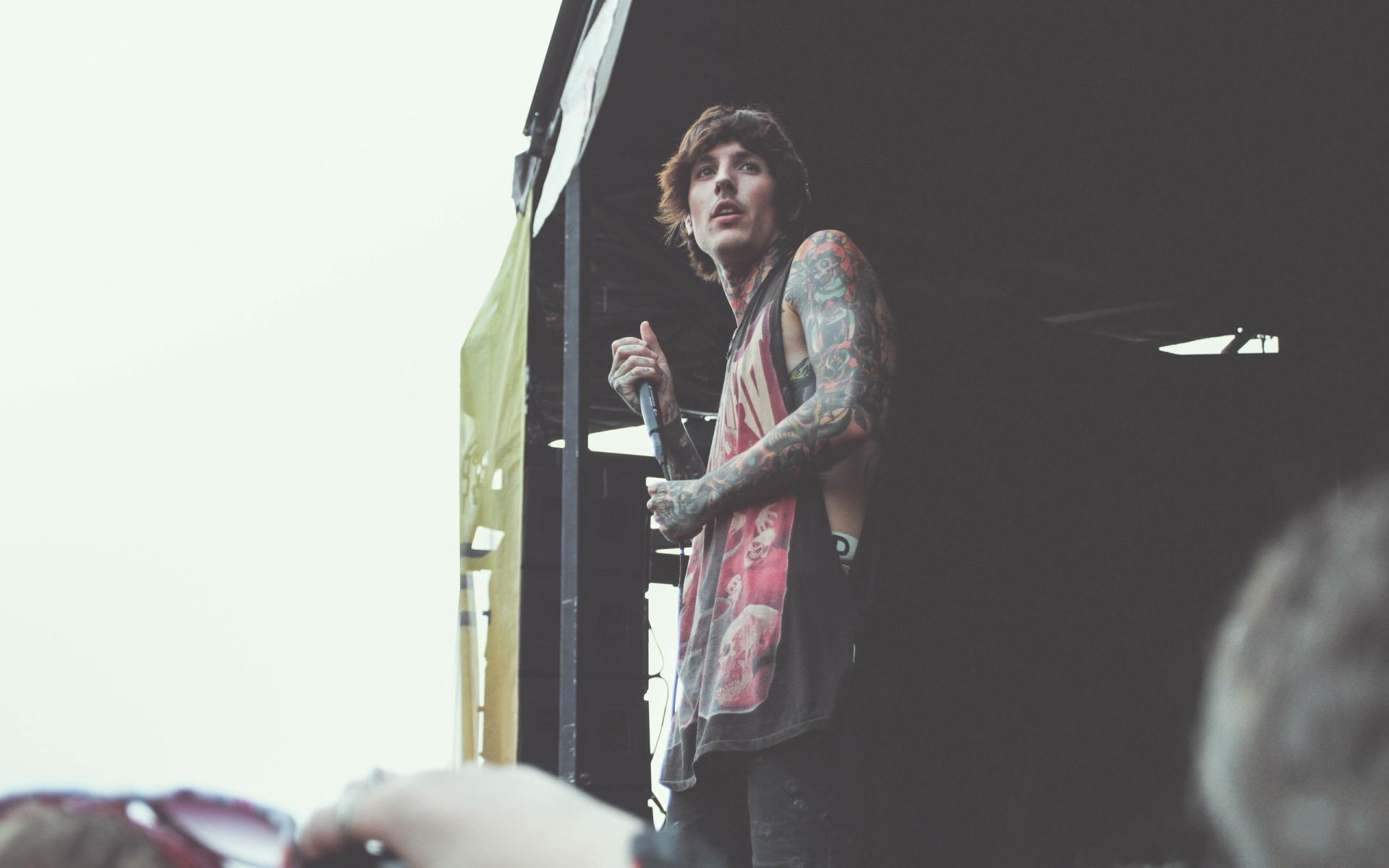
Sykes performing in 2013

=== Collaborations and musical projects ===
Sykes has been featured on You Me at Six's "Bite My Tongue", Architects' "Even If You Win, You're Still a Rat", Admiral's Arms' "Dawn of the New Age" and Deez Nuts's "If You Don't Know, You Know Now". He is also featured in a music video that accompanied "All I Want", a song by American rock band A Day to Remember.

In 2017, Sykes was featured as guest vocalist on the song "Silence Speaks" with English metalcore band While She Sleeps. Sykes was briefly featured in the music video for Charli XCX's 2017 song "Boys" along with other artists including Brendon Urie, Denzel Curry, Charlie Puth and Stormzy.

Sykes has also collaborated with DJ Skrillex as the backing vocals of the song "Visions", featured on the Bring Me the Horizon album There Is a Hell Believe Me I've Seen It. There Is a Heaven Let's Keep It a Secret.. Skrillex has also remixed a Bring Me the Horizon song "The Sadness Will Never End" off Suicide Season which the remix was featured on the Cut Up! version of the album. On 27 October 2017, Sykes performed with Linkin Park at Linkin Park and Friends: Celebrate Life in Honor of Chester Bennington. He performed the song "Crawling" with DJ and record producer Zedd on percussion.

=== Other ventures ===
Sykes is the founder and owner of the alternative clothing line Drop Dead Clothing (stylized as DROP DEAD). On 1 February 2013, Sykes launched Kickstarter project to fund a graphic novel created by him and Drop Dead Clothing artist Ben Ashton-Bell, entitled Raised by Raptors. With a £15,000 goal, the project exceeded its target within weeks of launching, attaining a final total of £39,223. In July 2018, Sykes opened a vegan restaurant/bar in Sheffield called "Church - Temple of Fun". The restaurant has an arcade and live music.

== Influences and legacy ==
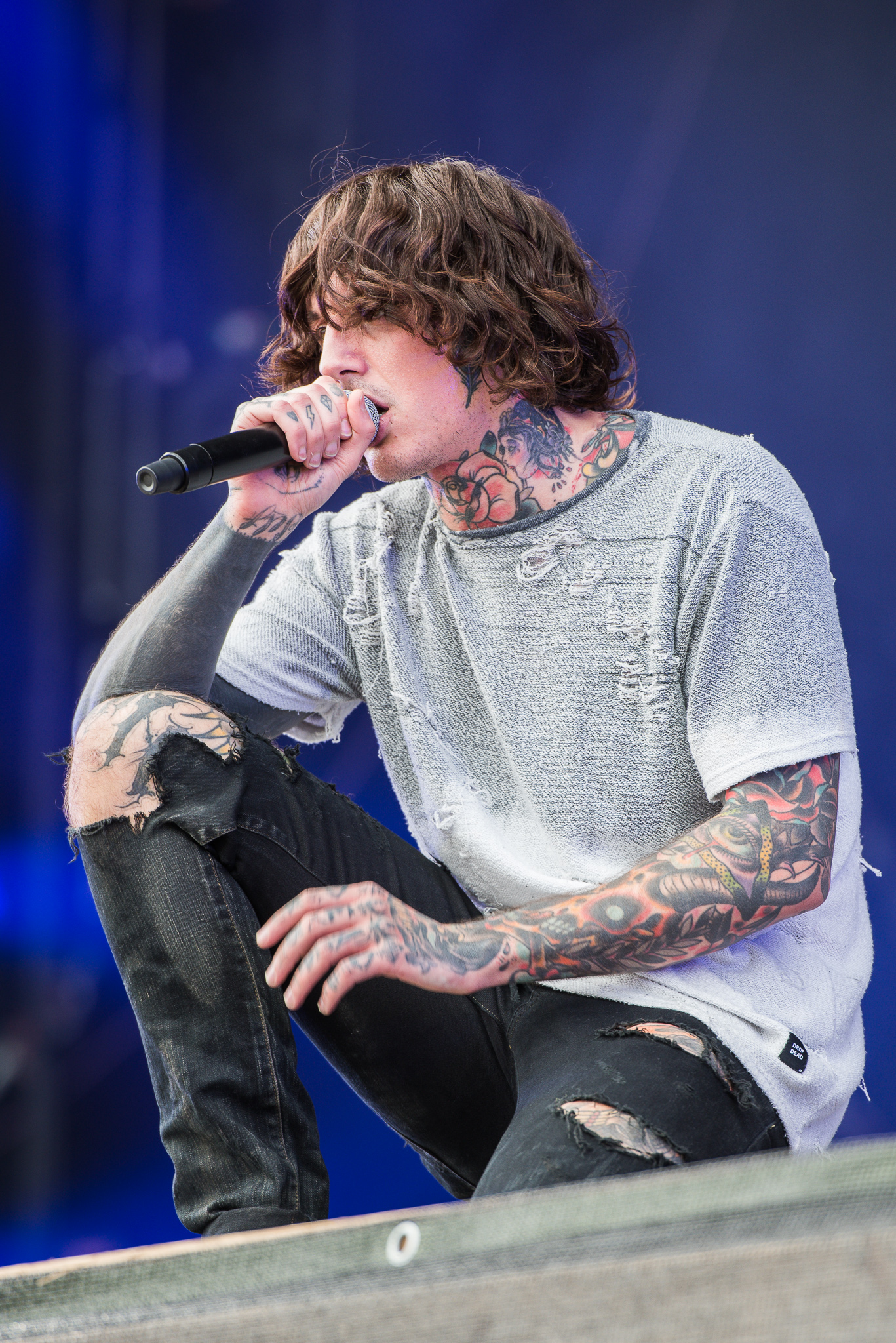
Sykes in 2016

Sykes has cited Glassjaw, Pantera, Black Flag, Misfits, Linkin Park, Simple Plan, Every Time I Die, Skycamefalling, Poison the Well, Norma Jean, Slipknot and The Dillinger Escape Plan as influences.

In 2006, when asked about the lyrics of Count Your Blessings, as they had been criticised for their content fixated on heartbreak or other themes that were called "shallow and meaningless", he responded "My life's never been that bad so I've not got that much to talk about". Sykes said in 2012 interview that lyrics have a strong feeling of catharsis for him. He mainly draws from personal experience and has likened the band's live performances to being therapeutic.

The main character of 2016 French film A Taste of Ink is an admirer of Oliver Sykes and Bring Me the Horizon. He is a post-hardcore singer and wears as a tribute to Oliver Sykes a Michael Jordan black jersey. The French title Compte tes blessures is inspired by the first album of the band Count Your Blessings.

== Personal life ==
Since the age of 12, Sykes has suffered from a form of night terrors known as sleep paralysis, which is the inability to move or speak while falling asleep, or upon waking.

Sykes became a vegetarian in 2003 at age 16 after watching a documentary about animal cruelty online: "When I saw how animals are tortured on factory farms, I couldn't justify being a part of that cruelty." He went on to become one of the faces for PETA, eventually designing charity T-shirts with the slogan "Meat Sucks" via his Drop Dead Clothing line. He turned vegetarian at age 16 before turning vegan 15 years later. His passion for veganism can be seen in his venture 'Church', an arcade bar with a fully vegan menu, opened in 2018 and based in Sheffield's Kelham Island.

Sykes is an outspoken atheist, stating "I don't believe in God. I was asked to believe in him when I was in a shitty place. I couldn't understand why I needed a god or, in my opinion, something that doesn't exist." In an interview with Radio.com in 2013, he also stated "In my opinion, I don't think believing in God is a victimless crime. It's not that I'm right and everyone else is wrong. If it was just people believing in God had no effect on the world, then it wouldn't matter. Then you can believe in what you want, if you want an imaginary friend that lives in the clouds that's fine. But it's the fact that it does have an effect on other people and other things and the whole world is in turmoil mainly because of religion, at least a massive part of it."

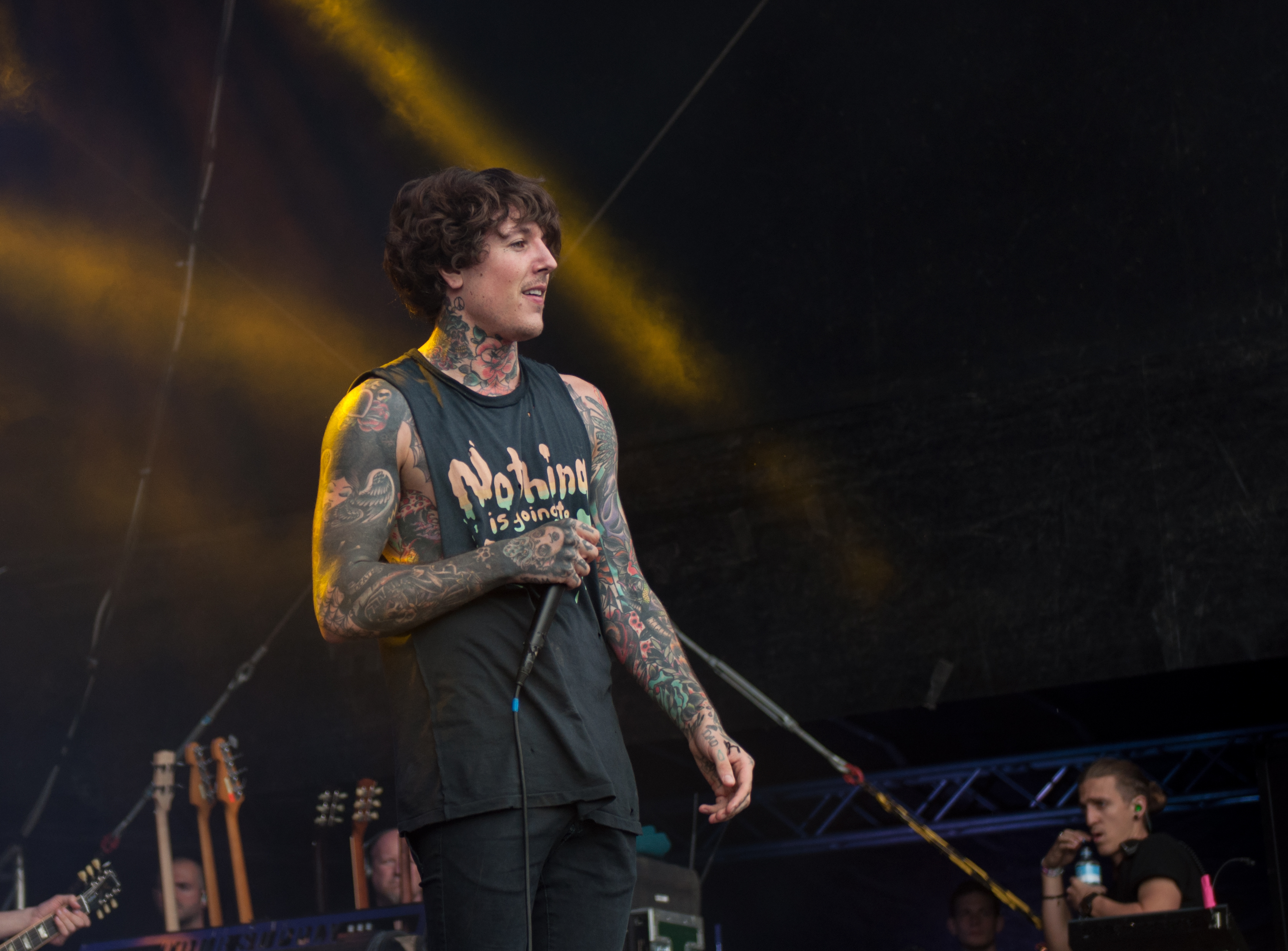
Sykes performing in 2014

After receiving the Album of the Year award at the first Alternative Press Music Awards in 2014, Sykes revealed a history of addiction and abuse of the drug ketamine. Addressing the crowd, he said "My band wanted to kill me, my parents wanted to kill me, my fucking brother wanted to kill me," and also admitted, "I went to rehab for a month, and you guys were sending me texts and e-mails. When I got out of that rehab, I didn't want to scream anymore, I wanted to sing from the fucking rooftops."

In 2007, a female fan accused Sykes of urinating on her and accused him and his bandmates of assaulting her. He was put on trial and pleaded not guilty. The fan took a photo of her face, which appeared to be covered in blood. An employee of venue Rock City in Nottingham, England, said: "After the gig, two girls tried to get on the tour bus. Later on, the singer, Oliver Sykes, tried it on with one of the girls. When she said no, he called her a dyke and first pissed on her before him and the rest of the band threw her and her friend off the bus. Once off the bus, someone within the band threw an empty bottle of Jagermeister at the girl's head". Sykes strongly denied the allegations. According to record label Visible Noise Records, "numerous versions of the alleged incident have been posted online". Charges against Sykes were dropped due to a lack of evidence.

On 12 July 2015 in Tuscany, Italy, Sykes married model and tattoo artist Hannah Pixie Snowdon. In 2016, Sykes announced that he and Snowdon had separated. In May 2019, Sykes alleged that their relationship ended due to Snowdon's infidelity, and referred to her as his "ex-wife". Snowdon, despite admitting to having been unfaithful, alleges that Sykes was also unfaithful as well as abusive in a 2016 Instagram post. Snowdon claims that Sykes "slapped and spat" on her and that she "wasn't the first girl this entire pattern happened to."

On 22 July 2017, Sykes married Brazilian model Alissa Salls. In March 2021, Sykes shared a photo on Instagram confirming he stayed in Brazil with his wife for the entirety of the COVID-19 pandemic to that point, that he had acquired a CPF number, and had bought a house in the city of Taubaté, countryside of the state of São Paulo, where he was living with her. In March 2023, Sykes got his Brazilian National Migration Registry card as a permanent resident of the country. In May 2025, Sykes and Salls revealed through their personal Instagram accounts, that she was expecting twins, a girl and a boy, alongside a gender reveal video. On 18 July 2025, Salls announced that she had given birth to their son and daughter.

== Discography ==
=== Bring Me the Horizon ===
- This Is What the Edge of Your Seat Was Made For (EP) (2004)
- Count Your Blessings (2006)
- Suicide Season (2008)
- There Is a Hell Believe Me I've Seen It. There Is a Heaven Let's Keep It a Secret. (2010)
- Sempiternal (2013)
- That's the Spirit (2015)
- Amo (2019)
- Music to Listen To... (2019)
- Post Human: Survival Horror (2020)
- Post Human: Nex Gen (2024)

=== Singles featured on ===
Year	Song	Album/EP	Artist
2009	"Dawn of the New Age"	Stories Are Told	Admiral's Arms
2010	"If You Don't Know, Now You Know"	This One's For You	Deez Nuts
2011	"Bite My Tongue"	Sinners Never Sleep	You Me at Six
2017	"Silence Speaks"	You Are We	While She Sleeps
2021	"No More Friends"	Episodes: Season 1	Olivia O'Brien
2021	"Obliterate"	Where the Body Goes	Lotus Eater
2021	"Salt"	Salt	Daine
2021	"Vampir"	Kiss of Death	IC3PEAK
2022	"Believe the Hype"	Let's Hope Heteros Fail, Learn and Retire	Alice Longyu Gao
2023	"Happier"	Non-album single	Yungblud
2026	"If the Sun Burns out Tonight" (featuring Grabbitz, Oli Sykes and Courtney LaPlante)	Non-album single	Valorant

=== Music videos ===
Year	Song	Artist	Director	Type	Link
2011	"All I Want"	A Day to Remember	Drew Russ	Performance	Video on YouTube
2011	"Bite My Tongue"	You Me at Six	Tim Mattia	Performance	Video on YouTube
2017	"Silence Speaks"	While She Sleeps	Tom Welsh and Taylor Fawcett	Performance	Video on YouTube
2017	"Boys"	Charli XCX	Charli XCX and Sarah McColgan	Cameo	Video on YouTube
2021	"Salt"	daine	Hiball	Performance	Video on YouTube
2022	"Maybe"	Machine Gun Kelly	Marc Klasfeld	Performance	Video on YouTube
2022	"Fallout"	Masked Wolf	Unknown	Performance	Video on YouTube
2022	"Bad Life"	Sigrid	Raja Virdi	Performance	Video on YouTube

== Accolades ==
Publication	Accolade	Year	Rank	Ref.
Alternative Press	Best Vocalist	2013	3	

== Bibliography ==
=== As writer ===
- Raised by Raptors (2013–present)
