= List of songs recorded by Bring Me the Horizon =

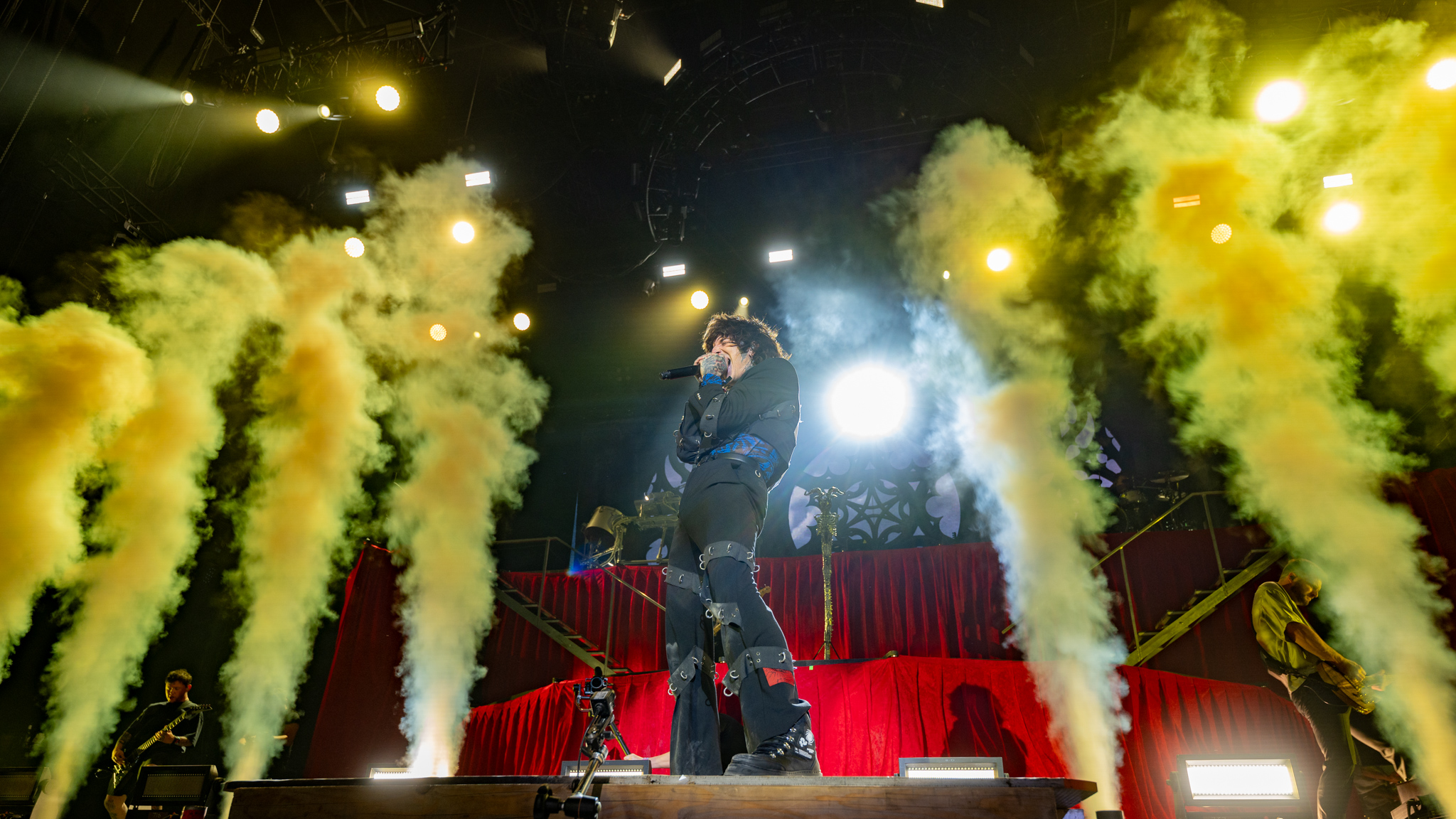
Bring Me The Horizon performing at Rock am Ring.

British rock band Bring Me the Horizon has recorded material for seven studio albums and two commercial releases, the most recent being Post Human: Nex Gen, released in 2024. The band was formed in Sheffield, South Yorkshire in 2004 by Oli Sykes, guitarists Lee Malia and Curtis Ward, bassist Matt Kean and drummer Matt Nicholls. The band independently released their demo album The Bedroom Sessions locally in mid-2004, gaining some local traction until they were noticed by several labels and were signed to Visible Noise and Thirty Days of Night. Via the labels, they released their debut EP This Is What the Edge of Your Seat Was Made For on Visible Noise in late 2004 in Australia and 2005 in their home country where it reached number 41 on the UK Budget Albums Chart and was branded as deathcore by critics. Their subsequent debut album Count Your Blessings continued this sound and was released in 2006, it ended up cracking the UK Albums Chart, peaking at number 93 and debuting inside the top ten of the UK Rock & Metal Albums Chart. Due to the hype surrounding the band in online circles on platforms such as MySpace, they gained a quick following with the release of singles such as "Pray for Plagues" and "For Stevie Wonder's Eyes Only (Braille)", which lead to them being presented the 2006 Kerrang! Award for "Best British Newcomer" shortly after the album's release. The band would later fizzle out their early deathcore sound with the release of their follow-up second album Suicide Season in 2008 that would more prominently be known as metalcore, it would also end up becoming their first album to chart on the US Billboard 200. The album would also feature their first collaborations such as Sam Carter of Architects and JJ Peters of Deez Nuts. In 2009, Ward left the band due to personal differences, with rhythm guitarist Jona Weinhofen joining in his place.

In 2010, the band entered the studio for the third time to record There Is a Hell Believe Me I've Seen It. There Is a Heaven Let's Keep It a Secret.. It was released that October to mostly positive reviews from critics, who praised the symphonic experimentation while they primarily retained the metalcore influences from Suicide Season. In 2013, Weinhofen left the band while new keyboardist Jordan Fish joined the band, reinventing their sound and introducing electronic elements as heard on their fourth studio album Sempiternal (2013) that was released to universal acclaim among fans and critics alike. It became a commercial success, being their first UK Top 5 album peaking at number 3, number 11 in the US while also topping the Australian Albums Chart and UK Rock & Metal Albums Chart for the second consecutive album running. The lead single "Shadow Moses", became the first song by the band to reach the Top 100 on the UK Singles Chart, while the other singles "Can You Feel My Heart" and "Sleepwalking" experienced similar success by being certified silver, gold and platinum in several markets.

In 2015, the band released their fifth studio album That's the Spirit, which to date is their greatest commercial release worldwide. It spawned its first platinum-selling record in the UK for 300,000 units, while also being certified Gold in the US and several other markets. It also marked the turn in a commercial mainstream rock sound for the band, which aided their first UK Top 40 hit in "Drown" where it peaked at number 17, that remains as their highest charting hit in their home country to this day. "Throne" became the first song by the band to go platinum in the UK as certified by the British Phonographic Industry. Only one of the seven released singles failed to be certified by the BPI, "Oh No".

The band later released their sixth studio album Amo and the first commercial release Music to Listen To... in 2019. The subsequent releases marked the transition for the band as pop rock. Amo's lead single "Mantra", as well as the album as a whole, was the first released material by the band to be nominated at the Grammy Awards. It became their first chart-topping album in the UK, followed by their most recent commercial release Post Human: Survival Horror which spawned three UK Top 40 hits in the likes of "Parasite Eve", "Obey" in collaboration with British singer Yungblud, and "Teardrops". Survival Horror is the first of four commercial releases under the Post Human banner. The follow-up Nex Gen was released as their seventh studio album in May 2024.

== Songs ==
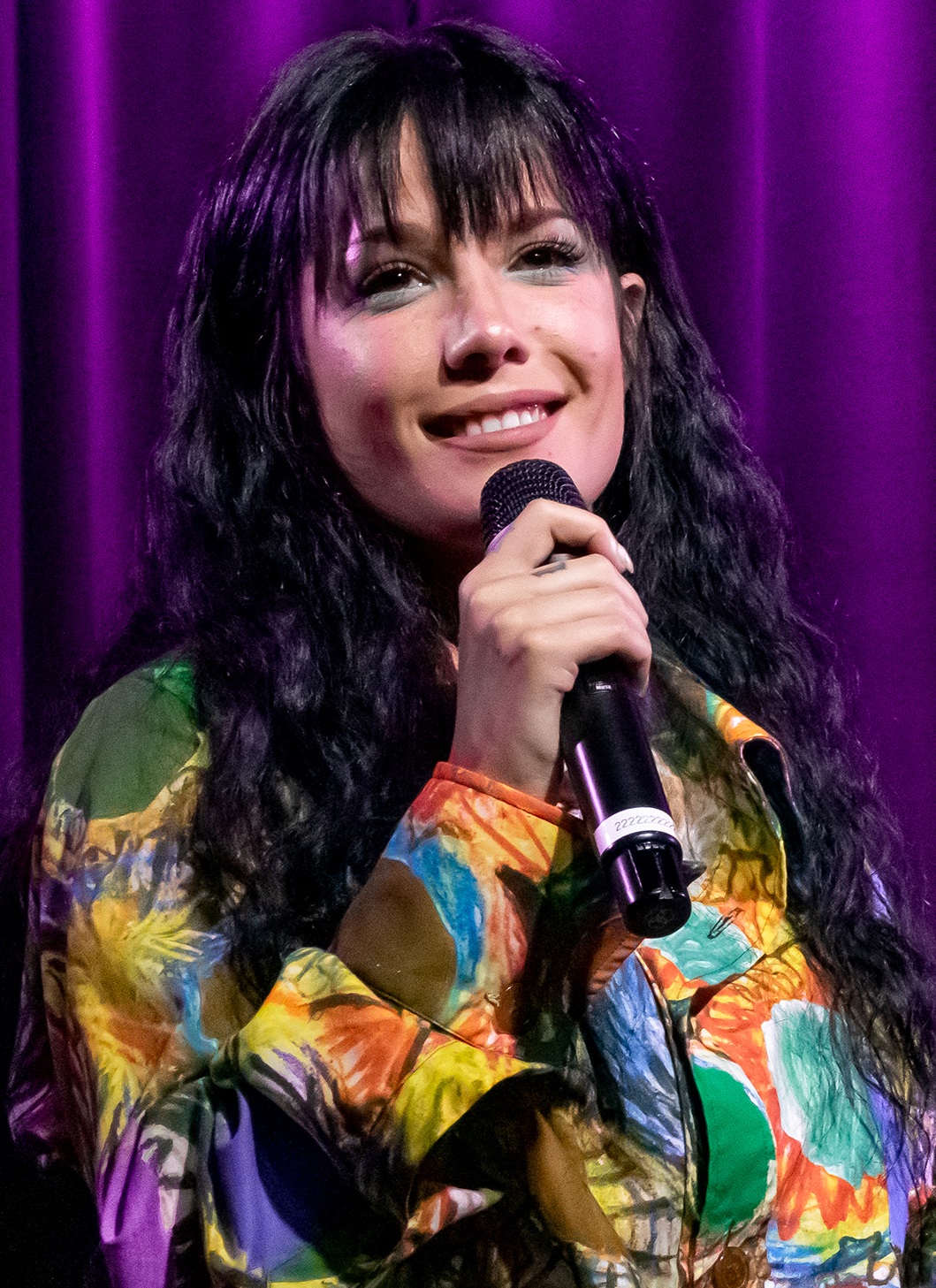
Halsey appears as a feature on "¿" off their 2019 record Music to Listen To.

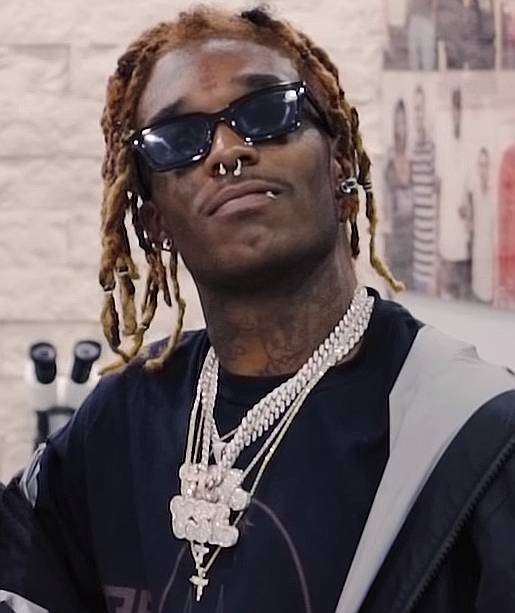
Lil Uzi Vert appears as a feature on "Amen!", off of their seventh studio album Post Human: Nex Gen.

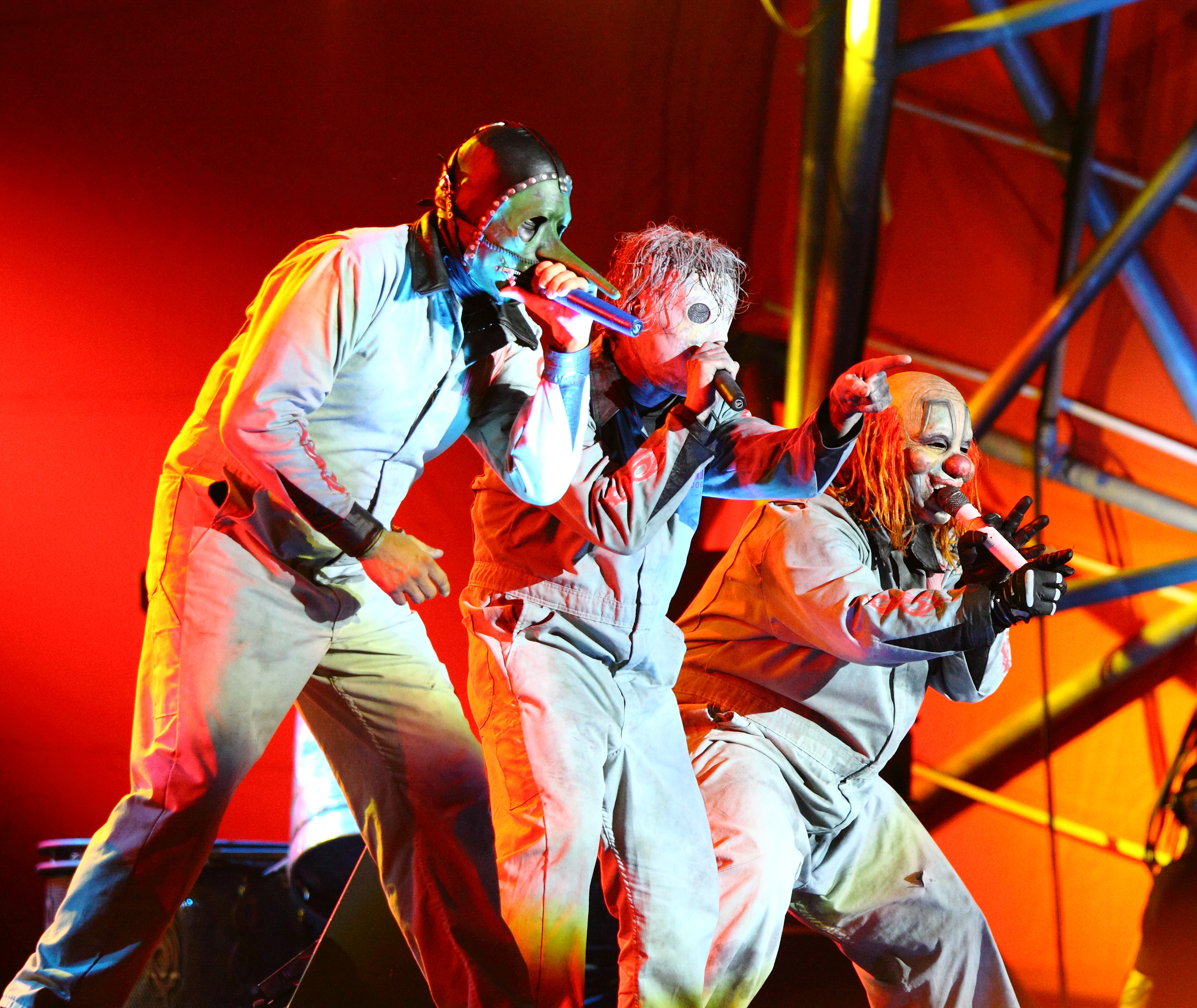
Bring Me the Horizon recorded a cover of Slipknot's "Eyeless" that appears as a bonus track on their debut album Count Your Blessings.

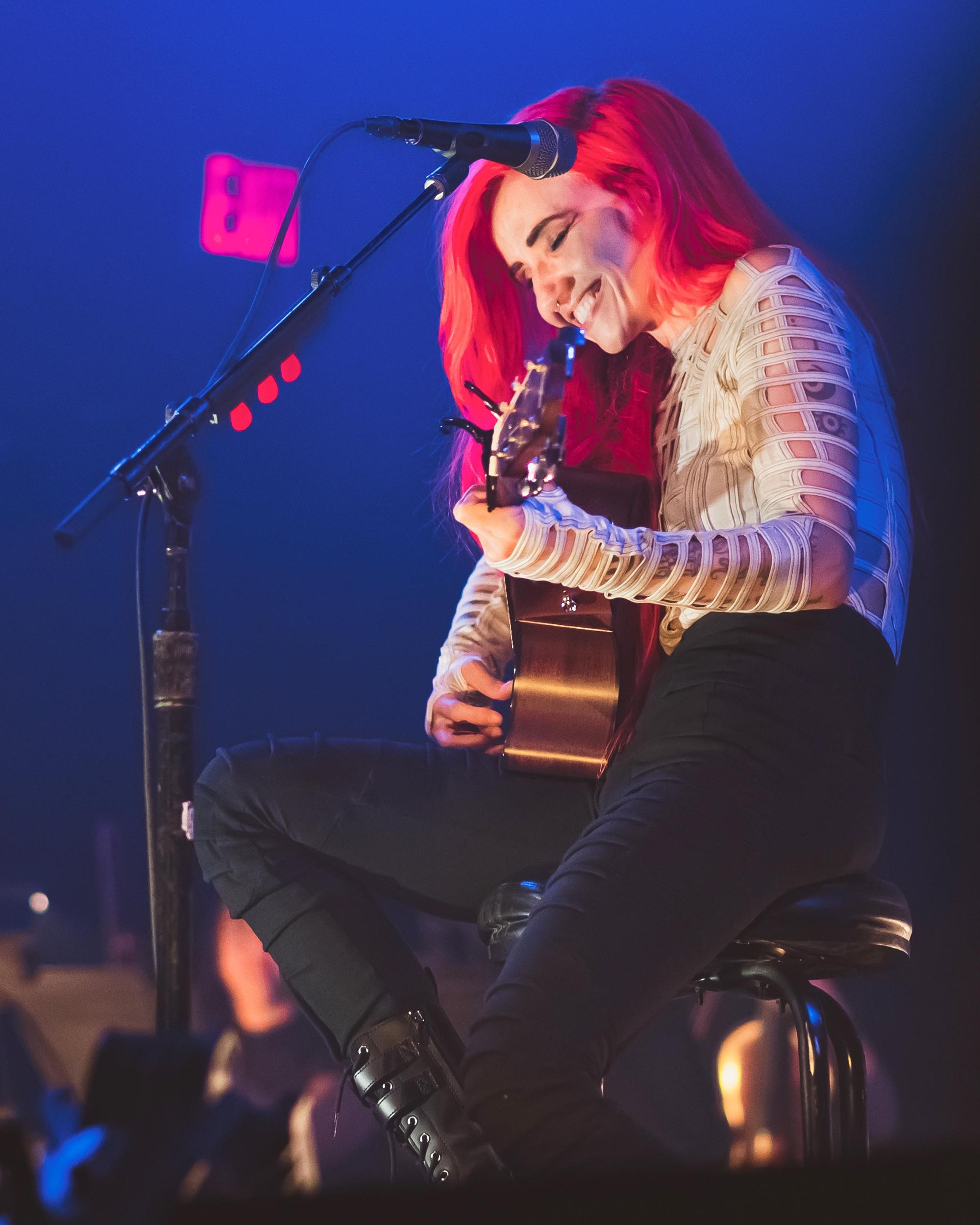
Lights contributed to several songs on There is a Hell..., performing as a guest feature on "Crucify Me" and "Don't Go".

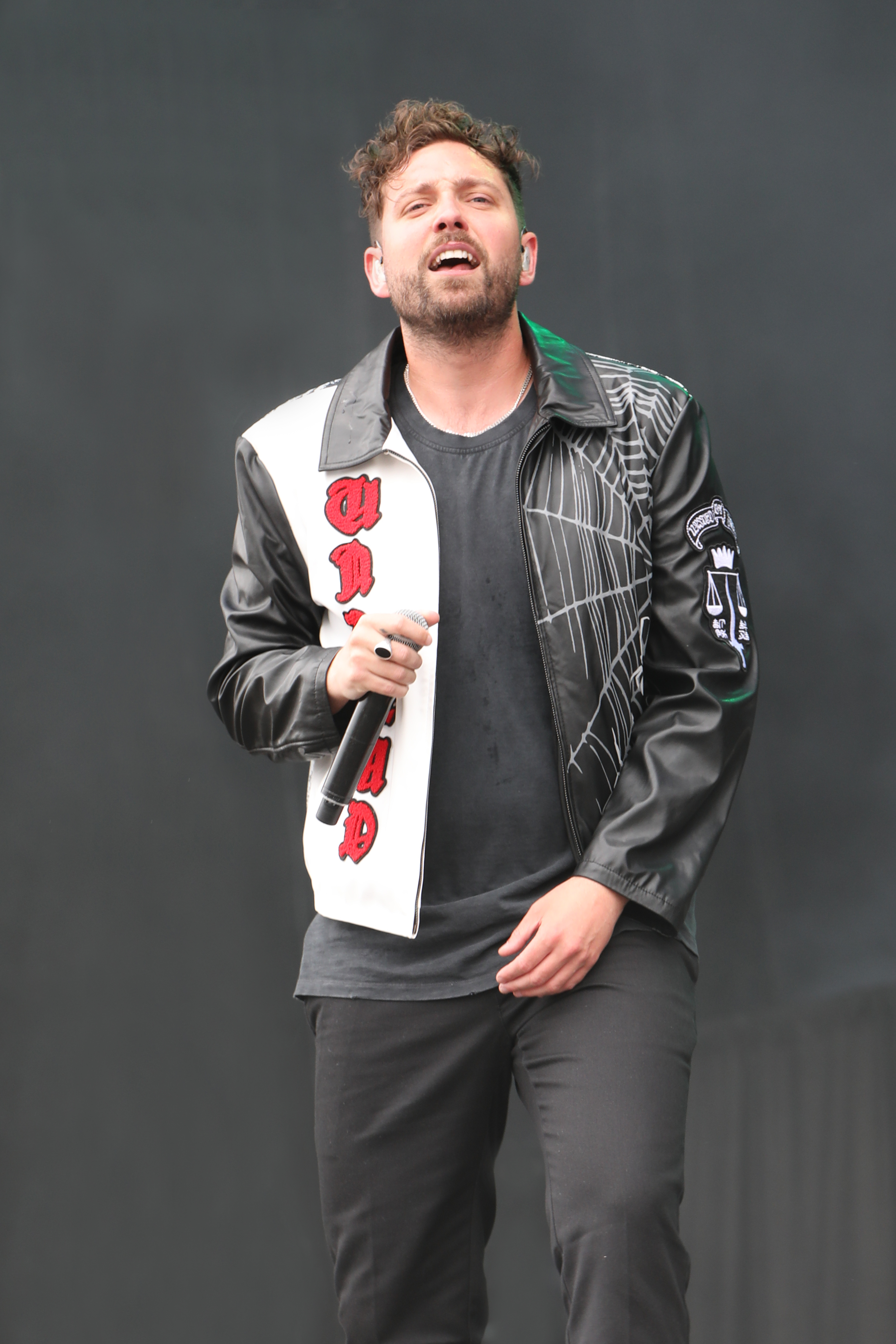
Josh Franceschi, the frontman of You Me at Six performed as a guest feature on "Fuck", off their third studio album There is a Hell....

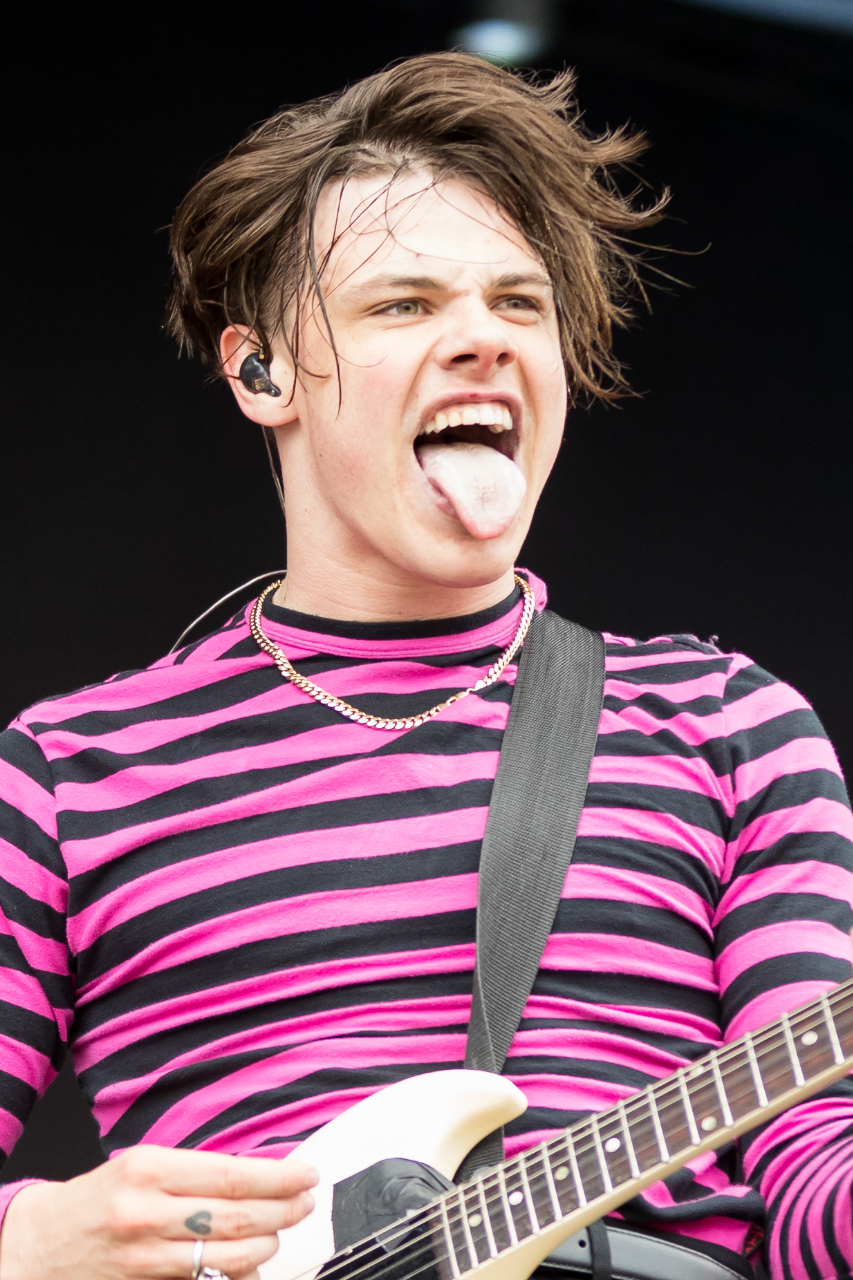
English singer Yungblud co-writes and appears in collaboration on "Obey" off their 2020 release Post Human: Survival Horror.

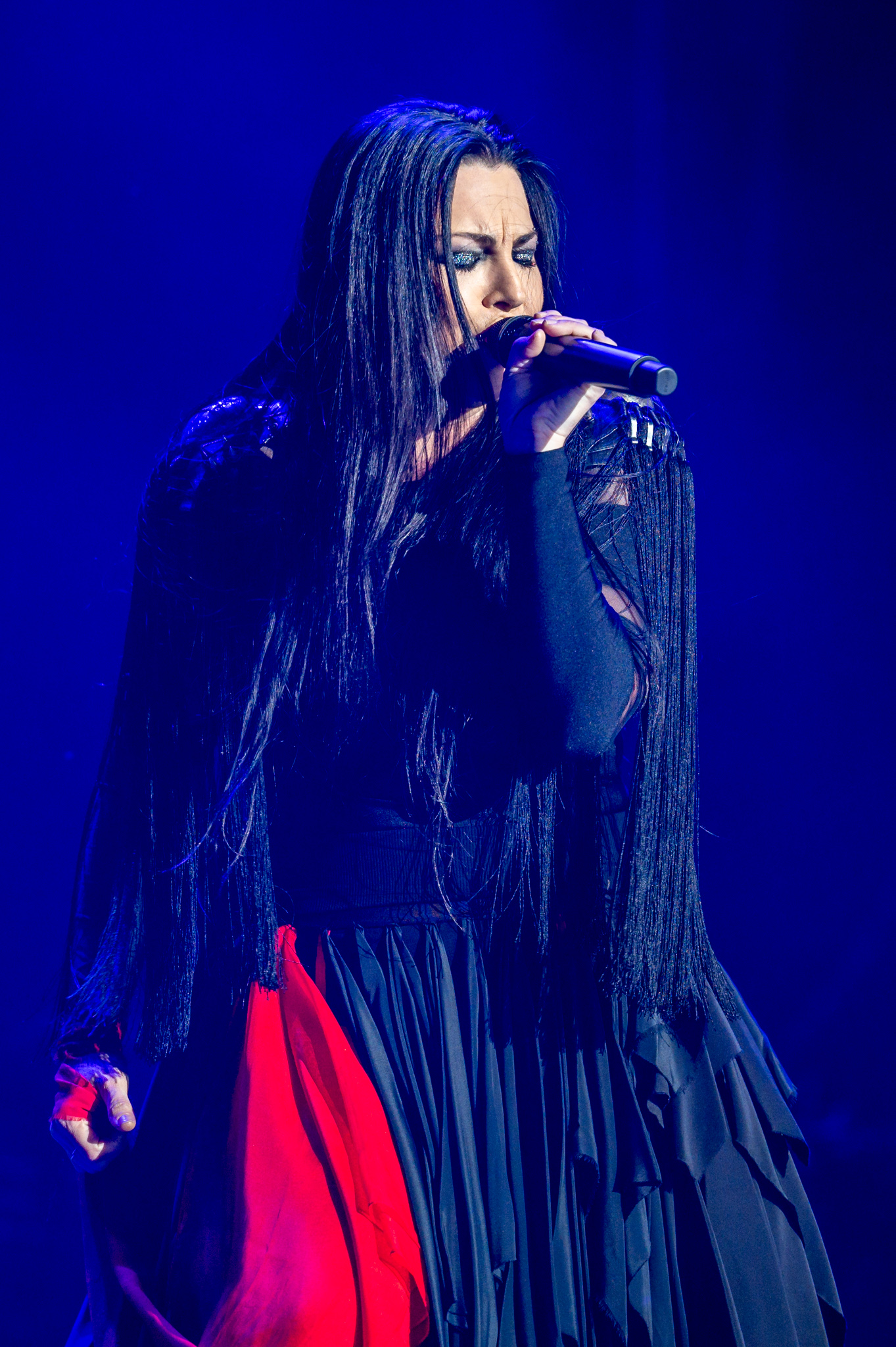
Evanescence frontwoman Amy Lee has a retrospective co-writing credit on "Nihilist Blues due to a lawsuit where the band got sued for unintentionally plagiarising Evanescence's song "Can't Look Back". The suit led to a collaboration between the two artists where Lee has a guest feature on "One Day The Only Butterflies Left Will Be In Your Chest As You March Towards Your Death" from Post Human: Survival Horror.

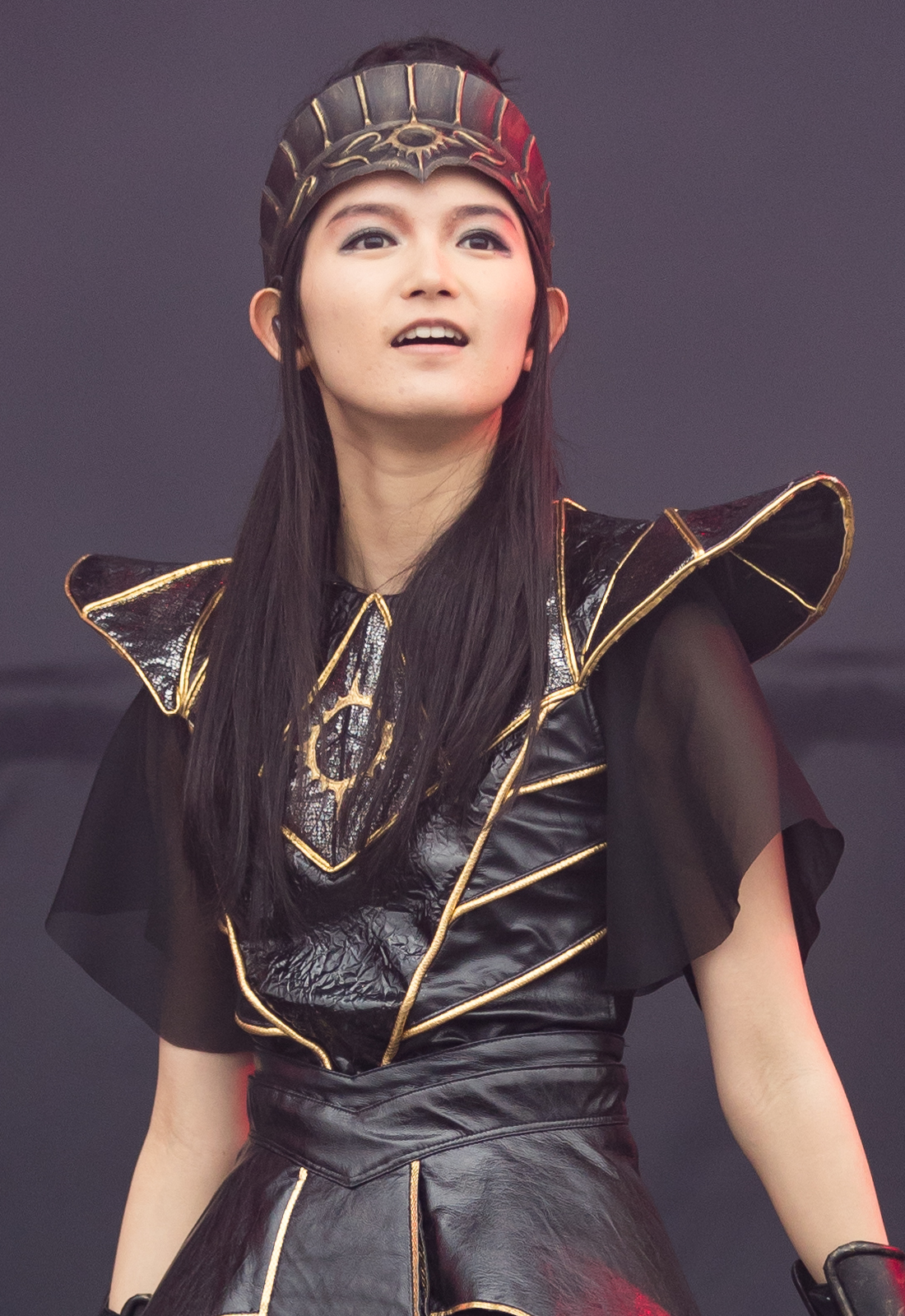
On behalf of Babymetal, Su-metal sung as a featured vocalist on the critically acclaimed "Kingslayer" from Post Human: Survival Horror.

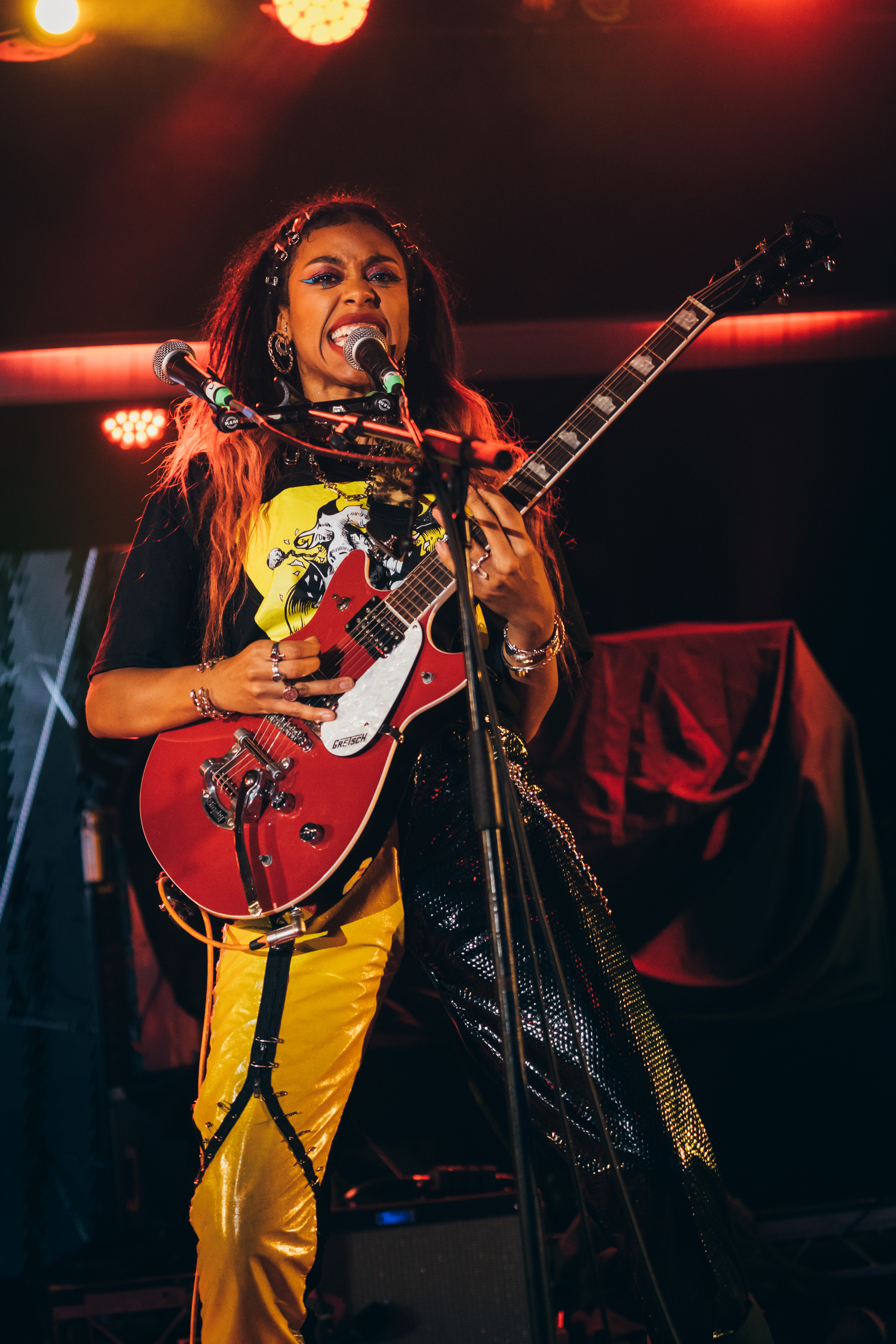
British rock duo Nova Twins featured on "1x1" on Post Human: Survival Horror.

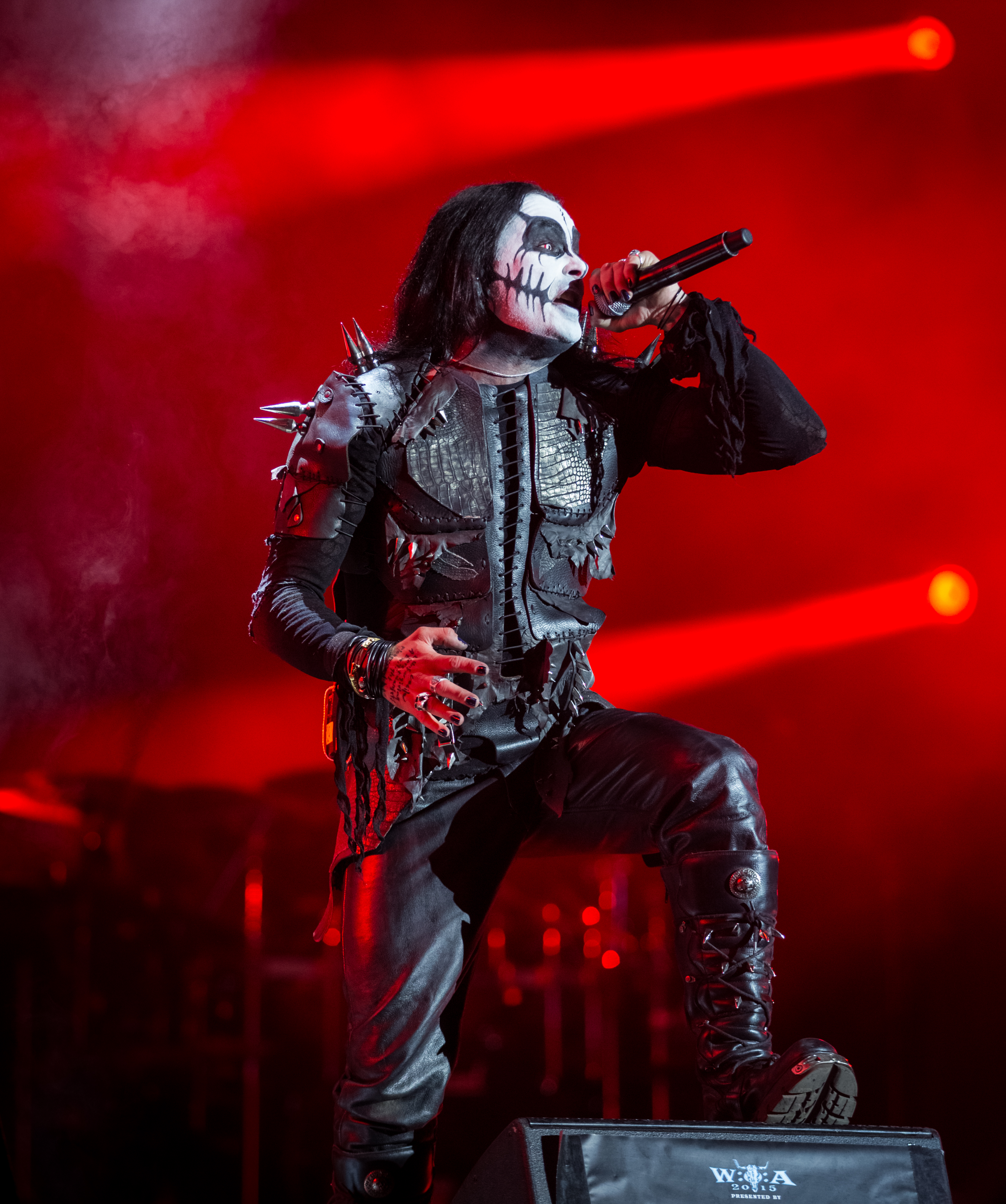
Dani Filth of British heavy metal band Cradle of Filth provided guest vocals on "Wonderful Life" from their sixth studio album Amo.

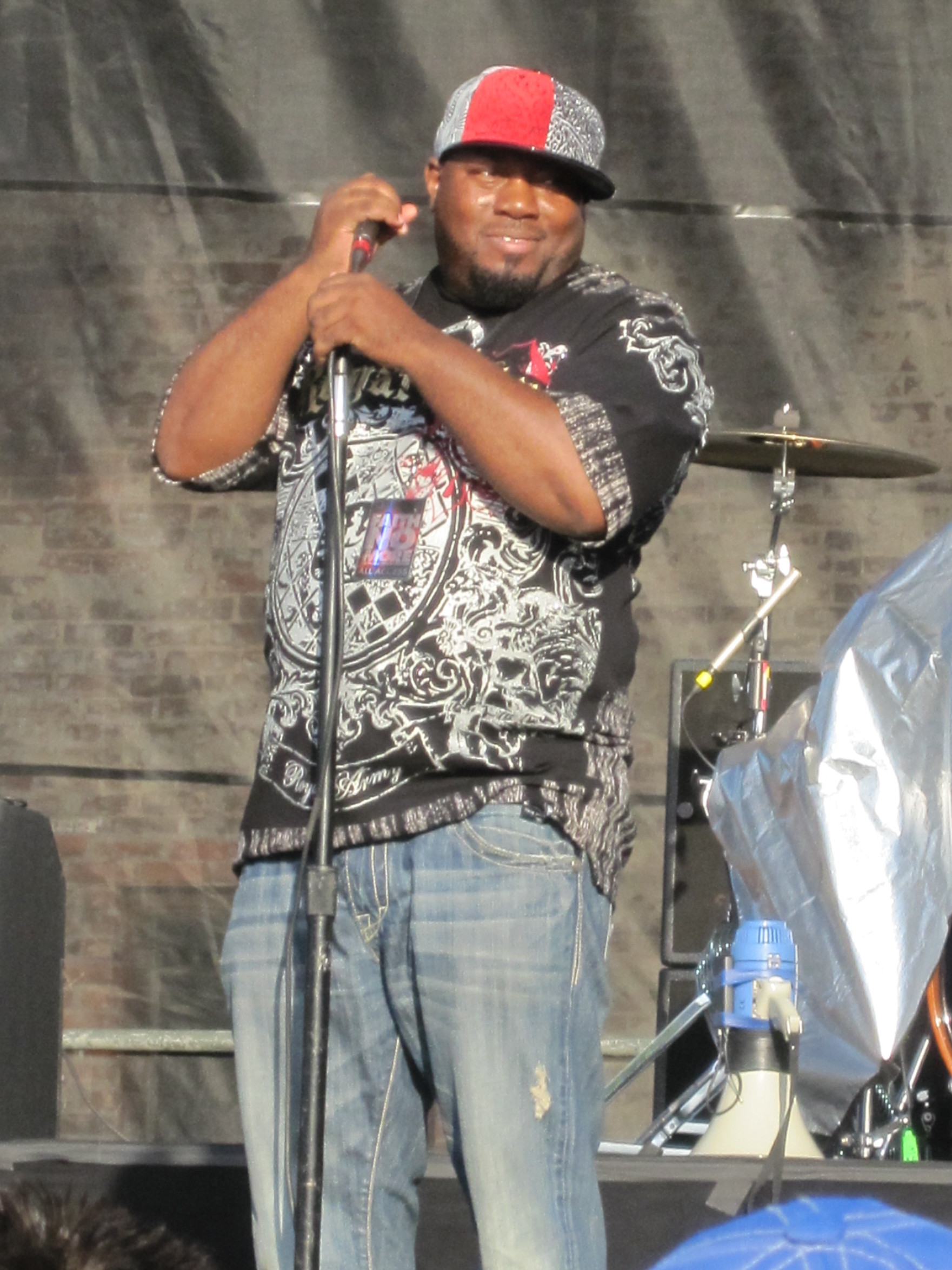
Former member of American hip-hop group The Roots, Rahzel featured as a guest vocalist by rapping on "Heavy Metal" from their 2019 studio album Amo.

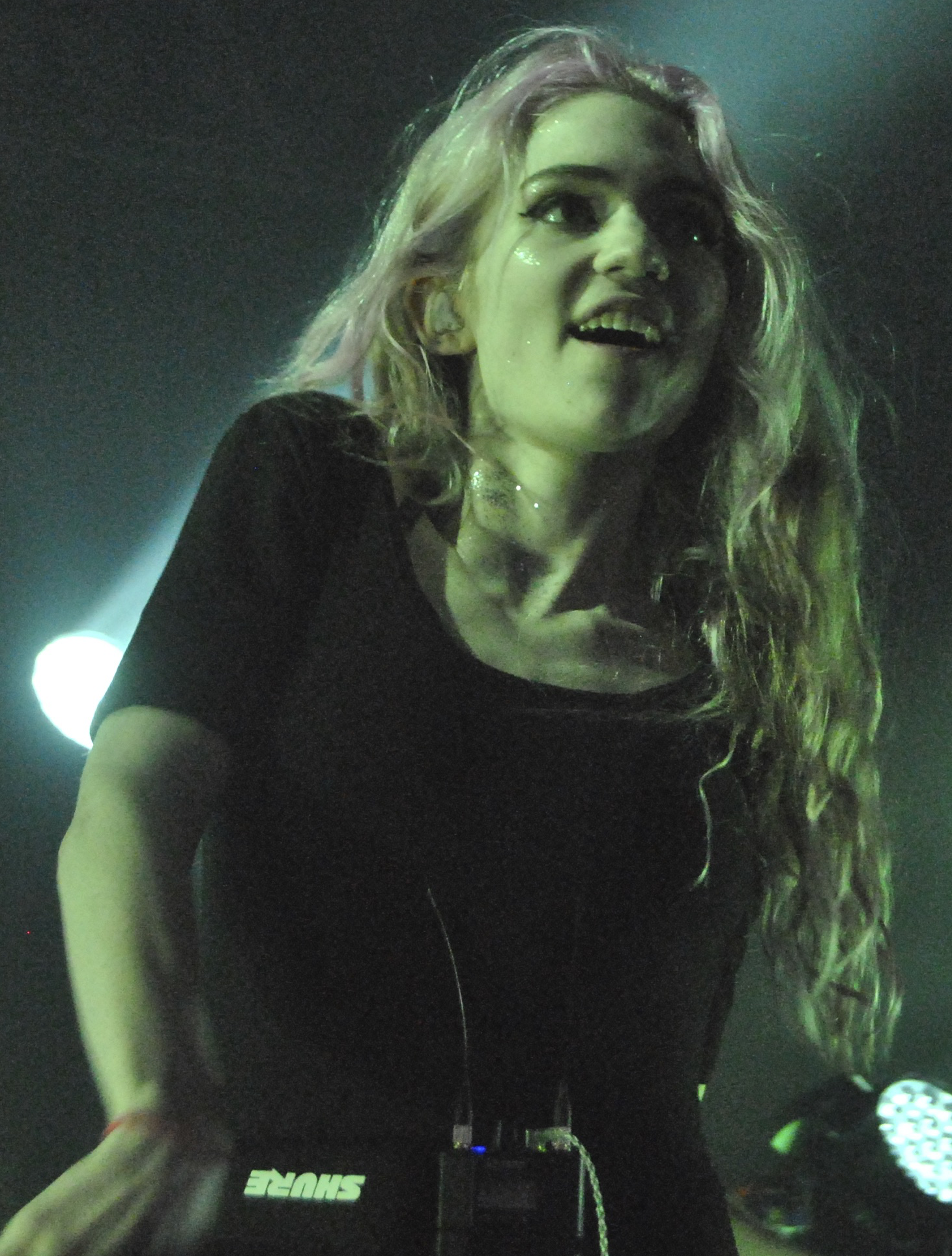
Canadian singer Grimes once stated in an interview that she loved the band's music, so the band later sent her "Nihilist Blues" to which she sang on that was featured on their album Amo.

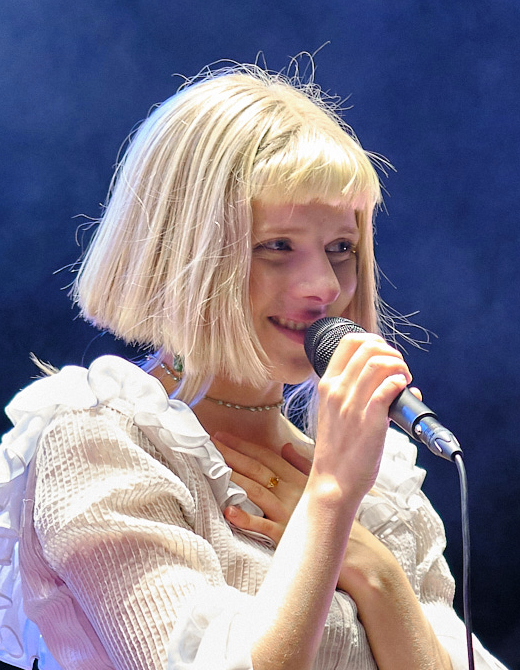
Norwegian singer Aurora was featured as a guest vocalist on "Limousine" from the band's seventh studio album Post Human: Nex Gen.

Key
†	Indicates single release
#	Indicates promotional single release

Song	Writer(s)	Album	Year	Ref.
"1x1" (featuring Nova Twins)	Oli Sykes; Jordan Fish; Amy Love; Georgia South	Post Human: Survival Horror	2020	
"¿" (featuring Halsey)	Sykes; Fish; Ashley Frangipane	Music to Listen To...	2019	
"±ªþ³§" (featuring Yonaka)	Sykes; Fish; Dan Lancaster; Theresa Jarvis; Alex Crosby	Music to Listen To...	2019	
"[OST] Dreamseeker"	Sykes; Lee Malia; Matt Kean; Matt Nicholls	Post Human: Nex Gen	2024	
"[OST] PUSS-E"	Sykes; Mikael Söderström	Post Human: Nex Gen	2024	
"[OST] (Spi)ritual"	Sykes; Malia; Kean; Nicholls	Post Human: Nex Gen	2024	
"A Bullet W- My Name On" (featuring Underoath)	Sykes; Malia; Kean; Nicholls; Aaron Gillespie; Spencer Chamberlain	Post Human: Nex Gen	2024	
"A Devastating Liberation"	Sykes; Fish; Simon Dobson	Music to Listen To...	2019	
"A Lot Like Vegas"	Sykes; Malia; Kean; Nicholls; Curtis Ward	Count Your Blessings	2006	
"Alligator Blood"	Sykes; Malia; Kean; Nicholls; Jona Weinhofen	There Is a Hell Believe Me I've Seen It. There Is a Heaven Let's Keep It a Secret.	2010	
"And the Snakes Start to Sing"	Sykes; Fish; Malia	Sempiternal	2013	
"Amen!" (featuring Lil Uzi Vert and Daryl Palumbo)	Sykes; Fish; Malia; Zakk Cervini	Post Human: Nex Gen	2023	
"Anthem"	Sykes; Malia; Kean; Nicholls; Weinhofen	There Is a Hell Believe Me I've Seen It. There Is a Heaven Let's Keep It a Secret.	2010	
"Antivist"	Sykes; Fish; Malia	Sempiternal	2013	
"Avalanche"	Sykes; Fish; Malia; Kean; Nicholls	That's the Spirit	2015	
"Blacklist"	Sykes; Malia; Kean; Nicholls; Weinhofen	There Is a Hell Believe Me I've Seen It. There Is a Heaven Let's Keep It a Secret.	2010	
"Blasphemy"	Sykes; Fish; Malia; Kean; Nicholls	That's the Spirit	2015	
"Blessed with a Curse"	Sykes; Malia; Kean; Nicholls; Weinhofen	There Is a Hell Believe Me I've Seen It. There Is a Heaven Let's Keep It a Secret.	2010	
"Black & Blue"	Sykes; Malia; Ward; Kean; Nicholls	Count Your Blessings	2006	
"Can You Feel My Heart"	Sykes; Fish; Malia	Sempiternal	2013	
"Candy Truck / You Expected: LAB Your Result: Green"	Sykes; Fish	Music to Listen To...	2019	
"Chasing Rainbows" (Note: "Chasing Rainbows" was released as a bonus track on the deluxe edition bonus disc of Sempiternal.)	Sykes; Fish; Malia	Sempiternal	2013	
"Chelsea Smile"	Sykes; Malia; Ward; Kean; Nicholls	Suicide Season	2008	
"The Comedown"	Sykes; Malia; Ward; Kean; Nicholls	Suicide Season	2008	
"Crooked Young"	Sykes; Fish; Malia	Sempiternal	2013	
"Crucify Me" (featuring Lights)	Sykes; Malia; Kean; Nicholls; Weinhofen	There Is a Hell Believe Me I've Seen It. There Is a Heaven Let's Keep It a Secret.	2010	
"Darkside"	Sykes; Fish; Malia; Kean; Nicholls; Cervini; Andrew Goldstein	Post Human: Nex Gen	2023	
"Dead Dolphin Sounds 'Aid Brain Growth in Unborn Child' Virtual Therapy / Nature Healing 2 Hours" (featuring Toriel)	Sykes; Fish; Lancaster; Alissa Salls	Music to Listen To...	2019	
"Dear Diary,"	Sykes; Fish; Malia; Kean; Nicholls	Post Human: Survival Horror	2020	
"Deathbeds" (featuring Hannah Snowdon) (Note: "Deathbeds" was released as a bonus track on the deluxe edition bonus disc of Sempiternal.)	Sykes; Fish; Malia	Sempiternal	2013	
"Death Breath"	Sykes; Malia; Ward; Kean; Nicholls	Suicide Season	2008	
"Dehumanized"	Sykes; Malia	Count Your Blessings | Repented	2026	
"Diamonds Aren't Forever"	Sykes; Malia; Ward; Kean; Nicholls	Suicide Season	2008	
"Die4U"	Sykes; Fish; BloodPop; Rami Yacoub; Madison Love	Post Human: Nex Gen	2021	
"Dig It"	Sykes; Malia; Kean; Nicholls	Post Human: Nex Gen	2024	
"Don't Go" (featuring Lights)	Sykes; Malia; Kean; Nicholls; Weinhofen	There Is a Hell Believe Me I've Seen It. There Is a Heaven Let's Keep It a Secret.	2010	
"Don't Look Down" (featuring Orifice Vulgatron)	Sykes; Fish; Malia	Drive Soundtrack	2014	
"Doomed"	Sykes; Fish; Malia; Kean; Nicholls	That's the Spirit	2015	
"Dragon Slaying"	Sykes; Malia; Ward; Kean; Nicholls	The Bedroom Sessions	2004	
"Drown"	Sykes; Fish; Malia; Kean; Nicholls	That's the Spirit	2014	
"Empire (Let Them Sing)"	Sykes; Fish; Malia	Sempiternal	2013	
"Eyeless" (Note: "Eyeless" is a Slipknot cover and was released as a bonus track on the Hot Topic edition of Count Your Blessings.)	Corey Taylor; Josh Brainard; Paul Gray; Joey Jordison; Shawn Crahan; Mick Thomson; Chris Fehn; Sid Wilson; Craig Jones	Count Your Blessings	2006	
"Fifteen Fathoms, Counting"	Sykes; Malia; Ward; Kean; Nicholls	Count Your Blessings	2006	
"Follow You"	Sykes; Fish; Malia; Kean; Nicholls	That's the Spirit	2015	
"Football Season Is Over" (featuring JJ Peters of Deez Nuts)	Sykes; Malia; Ward; Kean; Nicholls	Suicide Season	2008	
"For Stevie Wonder's Eyes Only (Braille)"	Sykes; Malia; Ward; Kean; Nicholls	Count Your Blessings	2006	
"Fresh Bruises"	Sykes; Fish; Malia; Kean; Nicholls	Amo	2019	
"The Fox and the Wolf" (featuring Josh Scogin of The Chariot)	Sykes; Malia; Kean; Nicholls; Weinhofen	There Is a Hell Believe Me I've Seen It. There Is a Heaven Let's Keep It a Secret.	2010	
"Fuck" (featuring Josh Franceschi of You Me at Six)	Sykes; Malia; Kean; Nicholls; Weinhofen	There Is a Hell Believe Me I've Seen It. There Is a Heaven Let's Keep It a Secret.	2010	
"Go to Hell, for Heaven's Sake"	Sykes; Fish; Malia	Sempiternal	2013	
"Happy Song"	Sykes; Fish; Malia; Kean; Nicholls	That's the Spirit	2015	
"Heavy Metal" (featuring Rahzel)	Sykes; Fish; Malia; Kean; Nicholls	Amo	2019	
"Home Sweet Hole"	Sykes; Malia; Kean; Nicholls; Weinhofen	There Is a Hell Believe Me I've Seen It. There Is a Heaven Let's Keep It a Secret.	2010	
"Hospital for Souls"	Sykes; Fish; Malia	Sempiternal	2013	
"The House of Wolves"	Sykes; Fish; Malia	Sempiternal	2013	
"Itch for the Cure (When Will We Be Free?)"	Sykes; Fish	Post Human: Survival Horror	2020	
"I Apologise If You Feel Something"	Sykes; Fish; Malia; Kean; Nicholls	Amo	2019	
"I Don't Know What to Say"	Sykes; Fish; Malia; Kean; Nicholls	Amo	2019	
"In the Dark"	Sykes; Fish; Malia; Kean; Nicholls	Amo	2019	
"It Never Ends"	Sykes; Malia; Kean; Nicholls; Weinhofen	There Is a Hell Believe Me I've Seen It. There Is a Heaven Let's Keep It a Secret.	2010	
"It Was Written in Blood"	Sykes; Malia; Ward; Kean; Nicholls	Suicide Season	2008	
"(I Used to Make Out With) Medusa"	Sykes; Malia; Ward; Kean; Nicholls	Count Your Blessings	2006	
"Join the Club" (Note: "Join the Club" was released as a bonus track on the deluxe edition bonus disc of Sempiternal.)	Sykes; Fish; Malia	Sempiternal	2013	
"Kingslayer" (featuring Babymetal)	Sykes; Fish; Mk-metal	Post Human: Survival Horror	2020	
"Kool-Aid"	Sykes; Malia; Nicholls; Lancaster; Cervini; Dai Dai	Post Human: Nex Gen	2024	
"Like Seeing Spiders Running Riot on Your Lover's Grave" (featuring Happyalone)	Sykes; Fish; Fionn Tobin; Paddy Hennessy	Music to Listen To...	2019	
"Limousine" (featuring Aurora)	Sykes; Malia; Kean; Nicholls; Aurora Aksnes	Post Human: Nex Gen	2024	
"Liquor & Love Lost"	Sykes; Malia; Ward; Kean; Nicholls	Count Your Blessings	2006	
"Lost"	Sykes; Fish; Malia; Kean; Nicholls	Post Human: Nex Gen	2023	
"Ludens"	Sykes; Fish	Post Human: Survival Horror	2020	
"Mantra"	Sykes; Fish; Malia; Kean; Nicholls	Amo	2018	
"Medicine"	Sykes; Fish; Malia; Kean; Nicholls	Amo	2019	
"Medusa" (Demo)	Sykes; Malia; Ward; Kean; Nicholls	The Bedroom Sessions	2004	
"Memorial"	Sykes; Malia; Kean; Nicholls; Weinhofen	There Is a Hell Believe Me I've Seen It. There Is a Heaven Let's Keep It a Secret.	2010	
"Mother Tongue"	Sykes; Fish; Malia; Kean; Nicholls	Amo	2019	
"N/A"	Sykes; Malia; Kean; Nicholls	Post Human: Nex Gen	2024	
"Nihilist Blues" (featuring Grimes)	Sykes; Fish; Malia; Kean; Nicholls; Amy Lee; Terry Balsamo; Tim McCord; Will Hunt	Amo	2019	
"No Need for Introductions, I've Read About Girls Like You on the Backs of Toilet Doors"	Sykes; Malia; Ward; Kean; Nicholls	Suicide Season	2008	
"Obey" (with Yungblud)	Sykes; Fish; Dominic Harrison	Post Human: Survival Horror	2020	
"Off The Heezay" (Demo)	Sykes; Malia; Ward; Kean; Nicholls	The Bedroom Sessions	2004	
"Off the Heezay"	Sykes; Malia; Ward; Kean; Nicholls	Count Your Blessings	2006	
"Oh No"	Sykes; Fish; Malia; Kean; Nicholls	That's the Spirit	2015	
"One Day the Only Butterflies Left Will Be in Your Chest as You March Towards Your Death" (featuring Amy Lee)	Sykes; Fish; Lee	Post Human: Survival Horror	2020	
"Ouch"	Sykes; Fish; Malia; Kean; Nicholls	Amo	2019	
"Parasite Eve"	Sykes; Fish; Malia; Kean; Nicholls; Petar Lyondev	Post Human: Survival Horror	2020	
"Pray for Plagues"	Sykes; Malia; Ward; Kean; Nicholls	Count Your Blessings	2006	
"Rawwwrr!"	Sykes; Malia; Ward; Kean; Nicholls	This Is What the Edge of Your Seat Was Made For	2004	
"RE: They Have No Reflections"	Sykes; Malia; Ward; Kean; Nicholls	This Is What the Edge of Your Seat Was Made For	2004	
"R.I.P. (Duskcore Remix)"	Sykes; Malia; Kean; Nicholls	Post Human: Nex Gen	2024	
"Run"	Sykes; Fish; Malia; Kean; Nicholls	That's the Spirit	2015	
"The Sadness Will Never End" (featuring Sam Carter of Architects)	Sykes; Malia; Ward; Kean; Nicholls	Suicide Season	2008	
"Seen It All Before"	Sykes; Fish; Malia	Sempiternal	2013	
"Shadow Moses"	Sykes; Fish; Malia	Sempiternal	2013	
"Shed Light"	Sykes; Malia; Ward; Kean; Nicholls	The Bedroom Sessions	2004	
"Sleepwalking"	Sykes; Fish; Malia	Sempiternal	2013	
"Sleep with One Eye Open"	Sykes; Malia; Ward; Kean; Nicholls	Suicide Season	2008	
"Slow Dance"	Sykes; Malia; Ward; Kean; Nicholls	Count Your Blessings	2006	
"Steal Something"	Sykes; Fish; Dobson; Will Harvey	Music to Listen To...	2019	
"Strangers"	Sykes; Fish; Malia; BloodPop; Caroline Ailin	Post Human: Nex Gen	2022	
"Sugar Honey Ice & Tea"	Sykes; Fish; Malia; Kean; Nicholls	Amo	2019	
"Suicide Season"	Sykes; Malia; Ward; Kean; Nicholls	Suicide Season	2008	
"Teardrops"	Sykes; Fish	Post Human: Survival Horror	2020	
"Tell Slater Not to Wash His Dick"	Sykes; Malia; Ward; Kean; Nicholls	Count Your Blessings	2006	
"Throne"	Sykes; Fish; Malia; Kean; Nicholls	That's the Spirit	2015	
"Top 10 Statues That Cried Blood"	Sykes; Fish; Malia; Kean; Nicholls; Goldstein	Post Human: Nex Gen	2024	
"Traitors Never Play Hangman"	Sykes; Malia; Ward; Kean; Nicholls	This Is What the Edge of Your Seat Was Made For	2004	
"True Friends"	Sykes; Fish; Malia; Kean; Nicholls	That's the Spirit	2015	
"Underground Big {HEADFULOFHYENA}" (featuring Bexey and Lotus Eater)	Sykes; Fish; Lancaster; Baek Ye Jin; Cameron Humphrey; Douglas Park; George Mejer	Music to Listen To...	2019	
"Visions"	Sykes; Malia; Kean; Nicholls; Weinhofen	There Is a Hell Believe Me I've Seen It. There Is a Heaven Let's Keep It a Secret.	2010	
"What You Need"	Sykes; Fish; Malia; Kean; Nicholls	That's the Spirit	2015	
"Who Wants Flowers When You're Dead? Nobody."	Sykes; Malia; Ward; Kean; Nicholls	This Is What the Edge of Your Seat Was Made For	2004	
"Who Wants Flowers When You're Dead? Nobody." (Demo)	Sykes; Malia; Ward; Kean; Nicholls	The Bedroom Sessions	2004	
"Why You Gotta Kick Me While I'm Down?"	Sykes; Fish; Malia; Kean; Nicholls	Amo	2019	
"Wonderful Life" (featuring Dani Filth)	Sykes; Fish; Malia; Kean; Nicholls	Amo	2018	
"Wonderwall" (Note: "Wonderwall" is an Oasis cover and was released as a part of the Spotify Singles in January 2025.)	Noel Gallagher	Spotify Singles	2025	
"Youtopia"	Sykes; Malia; Kean; Nicholls; Cervini; Lancaster	Post Human: Nex Gen	2024	
"Youtopia" (Earthcore remix)	Sykes; Malia; Kean; Nicholls; Cervini; Lancaster; Daisuke Ehaha; Sione Teumohenga	Spotify Singles	2025	
