= Live at the Royal Albert Hall (Bring Me the Horizon album) =

Live album by Bring Me the Horizon
- Released: 2 December 2016
- Recorded: 22 April 2016
- Venue: Royal Albert Hall, London, England
- Genre: Alternative rock; alternative metal; metalcore; symphonic metal
- Length: 83:33
- Label: Sony; RCA

Bring Me the Horizon chronology
| That's the Spirit (2015) | Live at the Royal Albert Hall (2016) | Amo (2019) |

Bring Me the Horizon video chronology
| Live at Wembley (2015) | Live at the Royal Albert Hall (2016) | L.I.V.E. in São Paulo (2026) |

Live at the Royal Albert Hall is the second live album and video by British rock band Bring Me the Horizon. It was recorded on 22 April 2016 at the Royal Albert Hall, with accompaniment from the Parallax Orchestra conducted by Simon Dobson. The album was released on 2 December 2016 through the crowdfunding platform PledgeMusic, with all proceeds being donated to Teenage Cancer Trust.

== Concert and response ==
On 26 November 2015, it was announced that Bring Me the Horizon would be performing at the Teenage Cancer Trust concerts at the Royal Albert Hall in London on 22 April 2016, being accompanied for the first time by a full live orchestra and choir. Tickets for the show went on sale on 4 December 2015. American rock band PVRIS performed as the opening act. Bring Me the Horizon performed alongside Parallax Orchestra conducted by Simon Dobson, and gave live debuts for That's the Spirit tracks "Avalanche" and "Oh No", as well as performing "It Never Ends" and "Empire (Let Them Sing)" (from There Is a Hell... and Sempiternal, respectively) for the first time since 2014.

Response to the concert was widely positive. Writing for The Independent, Steve Anderson awarded it four out of five stars, praising the performances of both the band's recent, more subtle material and their earlier, heavier songs. Similarly, Tomas Doyle of Rock Sound hailed the show as "a special, special night", highlighting "It Never Ends" as the best song. Metal Injection's Greg Kennelty proclaimed that "Like 'em or not, Bring Me the Horizon performed a fantastic set". Following the success of the show, Fish hinted at the possibility of completing a full tour with an orchestra, noting that "It seems almost a bit of a shame to go to all this effort for months and months for just one night".

== Promotion and release ==
In March 2016, it was announced that the show would be recorded and later released as a live video album, with all proceeds from the release going to Teenage Cancer Trust. After being initially slated for a 1 September 2016 release, the album was issued on 2 December 2016 on double CD, triple LP, double DVD, Blu-ray and digital download.

== Track listing ==
All lyrics are written by Oliver Sykes; all music is composed by Bring Me the Horizon, except where noted.

| No. | Title | Original album | Length |
|---|---|---|---|
| 1. | "Intro (Overture: At the Earth's Curve)/Doomed" (intro composed by Simon Dobson) | That's the Spirit | 7:24 |
| 2. | "Happy Song" | That's the Spirit | 4:43 |
| 3. | "Go to Hell, for Heaven's Sake" | Sempiternal | 5:09 |
| 4. | "Avalanche" | That's the Spirit | 5:29 |
| 5. | "It Never Ends" | There Is a Hell... | 6:07 |
| 6. | "Sleepwalking" | Sempiternal | 4:57 |
| 7. | "Empire (Let Them Sing)" | Sempiternal | 4:14 |
| 8. | "Throne" | That's the Spirit | 4:05 |
| 9. | "Shadow Moses" | Sempiternal | 5:09 |
| 10. | "True Friends" | That's the Spirit | 6:15 |
| 11. | "Follow You" | That's the Spirit | 3:54 |
| 12. | "Can You Feel My Heart" | Sempiternal | 6:00 |
| 13. | "Antivist" | Sempiternal | 4:32 |
| 14. | "Drown" | That's the Spirit | 7:09 |
| 15. | "Oh No" | That's the Spirit | 8:26 |
| Total length: | | | 83:33 |

== Personnel ==
Bring Me the Horizon

- Oli Sykes – lead vocals
- Jordan Fish – keyboards, programming, percussion, backing vocals
- Lee Malia – lead guitar
- Matt Kean – bass
- Matt Nicholls – drums, drum machine

Additional musicians

- John Jones – rhythm guitar
- Simon Dobson – conducting
- Will Harvey – violin
- Beatriz Carbonell – violin
- Claire Sledd – violin
- Lucy McKay – violin
- Elena Abad – violin
- Jess Coleman – violin
- Will Newell – violin
- Emma Fry – violin
- Jess Wadey – violin
- Conor Masterson – violin
- Olivia Holland – violin
- Iryna Glyeboya – violin
- Zami Jalil – viola
- Raisa Zapryanova – viola
- Emma Purslow – viola
- Ting-Ru Lai – viola
- Sophia Rees – viola
- Niamh Sanders – viola
- Maddie Cutter – cello
- Bethan Lloyd – cello
- Jobine Seikman – cello
- Fraser Bowles – cello
- Alexandra Marshall – cello
- Alice Grote – cello
- Alexander Verster – double bass
- Jess Ryan – double bass
- Sam Kinrade – trumpet
- Victoria Rule – trumpet
- Oli Hickie – French horn
- Stephen Craigen – French horn
- Laurie Truluck – French horn
- Tom Bettley – French horn
- Ben Thorpe – trombone
- Jane Salmon – trombone
- Ross Anderson – bass trombone
- George Ellis – tuba
- Zara Jealous – flute, piccolo
- Alex Griffiths – flute
- Eleanor Tinlin – oboe
- Stephanie Oatridge – oboe
- Antonia Lazenby – bassoon
- Tom Moss – contra bassoon
- Dan Hillman – clarinet, alto saxophone, baritone saxophone
- Will Gibson – clarinet
- Alexander Rider – harp
- Molly Lopresti – tuned percussion
- Beth Higham-Edwards – timpani
- Kat Marsh – choral vocals
- Dan Lancaster – choral vocals
- Christina Piper – choral vocals
- Julia Webb – choral vocals
- Josh Bevan – choral vocals
- Richard Thorp – choral vocals
- Mickael Picquerey – choral vocals
- Luke Holmes – choral vocals
- Catrina McTigue – choral vocals
- Emma Fish – choral vocals
- Patrick James Pearson – choral vocals
- Matthew Reynolds – choral vocals
- Rio Hellyer – choral vocals
- Elani Evangelou – choral vocals

== Charts ==
Chart performance for Live at the Royal Albert Hall
| Chart (2020) | Peak position |
|---|---|
| UK Album Downloads (OCC) | 87 |
