= Live at Wembley (Bring Me the Horizon album) =

Live album by Bring Me the Horizon
- Released: 22 June 2015
- Recorded: 5 December 2014
- Venue: Wembley Arena (London, England)
- Genre: Metalcore; post-hardcore
- Length: 1:26:26
- Label: Sony; RCA

Bring Me the Horizon chronology
Sempiternal (2013)	Live at Wembley (2015)	That's the Spirit (2015)

Bring Me the Horizon video chronology
Live at Wembley (2015)	Live at Royal Albert Hall (2016)

Live at Wembley is the first live album and video by British rock band Bring Me the Horizon. It was recorded live on 5 December 2014 during the headline show at Wembley Arena in Wembley, London. The opening acts were Young Guns, Issues, and Sleepwave. The live album was released on 22 June 2015 with very few copies made, and selling out very quickly. This was the first time the band had played the song "Pray for Plagues" in over three years, and was played alongside ex-rhythm guitarist, Curtis Ward, whom they had not performed with since his departure in 2009.

== Track listing ==
All lyrics are written by Oliver Sykes; all music is composed by Bring Me the Horizon.

No.	Title	Original album	Length
1.	"Intro"		0:30
2.	"Shadow Moses"	Sempiternal	4:54
3.	"Go to Hell, for Heaven's Sake"	Sempiternal	4:21
4.	"The House of Wolves"	Sempiternal	4:28
5.	"Diamonds Aren't Forever"	Suicide Season	5:02
6.	"It Never Ends"	There Is a Hell...	5:54
7.	"And the Snakes Start to Sing"	Sempiternal	5:58
8.	"Alligator Blood"	There Is a Hell...	5:15
9.	"Empire (Let Them Sing)"	Sempiternal	4:00
10.	"Chelsea Smile"	Suicide Season	6:42
11.	"Pray for Plagues"	Count Your Blessings	5:13
12.	"Blessed with a Curse"	There Is a Hell...	5:28
13.	"Antivist"	Sempiternal	4:03
14.	"Sleepwalking"	Sempiternal	5:42
15.	"Hospital for Souls"	Sempiternal	7:02
16.	"Drown"	That's the Spirit	4:23
17.	"Can You Feel My Heart"	Sempiternal	7:31
Total length:			1:26:26

Notes

- Track 16 was originally released as a non-album single and later re-recorded and released on That's the Spirit.

== Personnel ==
Bring Me the Horizon

- Oli Sykes – lead vocals
- Jordan Fish – keyboards, programming, percussion, backing vocals
- Lee Malia – lead guitar
- Matt Kean – bass
- Matt Nicholls – drums
- John Jones – rhythm guitar
- Curtis Ward – rhythm guitar on track 11

== Charts ==
Chart (2015)	Peak position
Austrian Albums (Ö3 Austria Top 40)	6
German Albums (GfK)	50
Swedish Albums (Sverigetopplistan)	5
Swiss Albums (Swiss Hitparade)	3
UK Official Music Video (OCC)	1
