= Shadow Moses =

Shadow Moses may refer to:

- Shadow Moses, a fictional location and site of the 'Shadow Moses Incident' in the video game Metal Gear Solid
- "Shadow Moses" (song), a 2013 song by Bring Me the Horizon
