= Antivist =

Promotional single by Bring Me the Horizon

from the album Sempiternal
- Released: 19 February 2013
- Genre: Metalcore; nu metal
- Length: 3:13
- Label: Sony; RCA; Epitaph
- Songwriters: Oliver Sykes; Lee Malia; Jordan Fish
- Producer: Terry Date

"Antivist" is a song by British rock band Bring Me the Horizon. Written by vocalist Oliver Sykes, guitarist Lee Malia and keyboardist Jordan Fish, it was produced by Terry Date and featured on the band's 2013 fourth studio album Sempiternal. Although it was not released as a single, the song is considered to be one of the band's most popular tracks, and it continues to be performed live on a regular basis.

== Composition and lyrics ==
According to Bring Me the Horizon bassist Matt Kean, "Antivist" was originally written "as a joke ... when everyone was kind of like bored", but was later worked on for inclusion on Sempiternal due to its "super aggressive" nature providing a different element for the album. Vocalist Oliver Sykes has also noted the song's origins as "almost a joke", explaining that he first came up with the hook "Middle fingers up! If you don't give a fuck!", which he described as "the most nu metal mosher lyrics of all time" when sharing it with keyboardist Jordan Fish.

Speaking in an interview with website Thrash Hits, Sykes explained that "Antivist" is intended to act as "a bit of a social commentary", adding that "It's not even about us, it's just our generation – they're lazy, sit on their arse and think they're doing something". The interviewer described the track as "emphatically negative". The frontman added to this description in a track-by-track feature published by Metal Hammer magazine, explaining that the song is inspired by "slacktivists" and giving the example of "online people that just talk shit on Twitter".

The lyrics to "Antivist" are said to be inspired by the band's former guitarist and backing vocalist Jona Weinhofen, who left in early 2013 after almost four years with the band. Introducing the song before one of its earliest live performances in February 2013, vocalist Oliver Sykes proclaimed that "This song is called 'Antivist'. It goes out to Jona Weinhofen", whilst at the same time "flipping the bird".

Musically, "Antivist" has been identified as noticeably different from much of the rest of Sempiternal by commentators. Loudwire writer Spencer Kaufman highlighted it as the "angriest" song on the album, describing it as an "unrelenting track that literally offers up the middle finger to the world". Similarly, BBC Music's Mike Diver dubbed it "the rawest track you'll hear on a charting album in 2013". Dean Brown of PopMatters noted that the song features "Slipknot-esque [guitar] riffs", describing it as "a startling moment of reality-fuelled anger". Alternative Press writer Dan Slessor simply described it as "pure hatred unleashed".

== Promotion and release ==
Prior to the release of Sempiternal, Bring Me the Horizon gave fans the chance to listen to "Antivist" by sharing a dedicated website on social media. The track was successfully "unlocked" and made available for free online streaming on SoundCloud and YouTube on 19 February 2013. According to set list aggregation website setlist.fm, "Antivist" is the fourth most-played song by Bring Me the Horizon, behind singles "Chelsea Smile", "Diamonds Aren't Forever" (both from Suicide Season) and "Shadow Moses" (also from Sempiternal). The song was featured on the band's debut live video album, 2015's Live at Wembley, as well as their second, 2016's Live at the Royal Albert Hall.

== Live performances ==
Bring Me the Horizon often bring a guest, usually a fan, on stage for live performances of "Antivist". Notable guests that have performed the song alongside the band include Noah Sebastian of Bad Omens (Cardiff, January 2024), IV of Sleep Token (Brisbane, April 2024), and Will Ramos of Lorna Shore (Hellfest, June 2026).

== Critical reception ==
Media response to "Antivist" was generally positive. Laurence Green for musicOMH noted that "Antivist delivers a withering salvo of expletives ... [which] drip with a venom and furiousity [sic] so distilled, it could cut glass". Writing for the NME, David Renshaw proposed that "Antivist" (as well as "The House of Wolves") "[typified] the album's muscular and impressive anthemics". Dean Brown of PopMatters praised Lee Malia's guitar work and Oliver Sykes's vocal performance, while BBC Music's Mike Diver praised Terry Date's production work for making the song "gleam with an instant accessibility". Music Feeds columnist Mike Hohen reviewed the song as "a fairly catchy jam that features one of the biggest c-bomb's I've personally ever heard by a metalcore band – it's pretty awesome". The Shields Gazette dubbed it a highlight of Sempiternal alongside lead single "Shadow Moses".

Other writers criticised the inclusion of "Antivist" on Sempiternal. Reviewing the album for Exclaim!, Bradley Zorgdrager claimed that the song "water[s] down what could have been a much stronger offering". Similarly, Dom Lawson of The Guardian highlighted it as evidence of poor lyrical content on the record, suggesting that "the petulance of the otherwise invigorating Antivist is particularly cringeworthy". AbsolutePunk writer Drew Beringer dubbed it "the only misstep on the album", but reassured readers that it was "a slight one at that".
