= Immanu El =

- Origin: Jönköping, Sweden
- Genres: Dream Pop, Post-rock
- Years active: 2004–present
- Labels: Glitterhouse Records, And The Sound Records, Thomason Sounds
- Members: Claes Strängberg - Guitar/Vox; Per Strängberg - Guitar; Jonatan Josefsson - Drums; David Lillberg - Guitar/Keys/Samples
- Website: www.immanu-el.com

Immanu El (often typeset as IMMANU EL) is a dream pop / post-rock band formed based in Stockholm, Sweden.

== History ==
Immanu El started as a musical experiment in 2004 by 16-year-old Claes Strängberg, who was soon joined by his twin brother Per and friends David Lillberg, Jonatan Josefsson. After a few concerts in Sweden, supporting such bands as Logh and Loney, Dear, Immanu El was booked to perform at Rookiefestivalen in Hultsfred, a festival hosted by Hultsfredsfestivalen (Rockparty) - the biggest Swedish music festival at the time and an opportunity for unsigned bands to perform at a major event. The band released their first demo EP titled Killerwhale in 2005, before they signed with Swedish independent record label And the Sound Records and Japanese label Thomason Sounds (Inpartmaint) in 2006.

The first full-length album They'll Come, They Come was released in August 2007 and the band moved from the outskirts of Jönköping to Gothenburg. Immanu El started to perform shows outside Sweden and made their first European tours in 2008 and 2009. The second album Moen was released 2009 with a limited vinyl LP released by the German record label Kapitän Platte. The release of Moen was followed by more tours in Europe and the third album In Passage was released in 2011, also in cooperation with Kapitän Platte who released the vinyl edition. During 2012/2013 the band made several tours and made their first shows outside Europe. Immanu El performed at SXSW in Austin, Reeperbahn Festival in Hamburg, Filter's Culture Collide Festival in LA, CMJ Music Marathon in New York, Canadian Music Week in Toronto and Strawberry Festival in Beijing and Shanghai. In May 2013, the album They'll Come, They Come was released in a new edition by And The Sound Records and the German label partner Kapitän Platte. After more than 300 concerts in +30 countries, the band took a short break before starting to work on their album Hibernation

Hibernation was the first record to be recorded outside Sweden - Immanu El hired the Swedish Grammy nominated producer Johan Eckeborn and recorded the album in Zoo Studios outside Florence, Italy in 2014. The band signed a new record deal with the German label Glitterhouse Records and released the album in late 2016. The album was funded by fans through a Kickstarter campaign. Before the release, Immanu El supported Explosions In The Sky for two shows in Hamburg and Berlin during their European tour. Immanu El made two tours after the album release in 2017 - one in Europe and one in Asia. By this time three of the band's four members had moved to Stockholm.

In 2018 Immanu El announced the recording of the band's fifth full-length album Structures. The album was recorded and produced in the band's studio in Stockholm and was announced in 2019 to be released later during the year.

Original band members Michael Persson (drums) and Emil Karlsson (bass guitar) left the band in 2009 and 2012, replaced by Jonatan Josefsson (drums) and Robin Ausberg (bass guitar). Robin Ausberg left the band in 2015 and is not replaced. Alexander Grönlund has been touring and recording bass guitar with the band since 2016.

== Discography ==
=== Studio albums ===
- They'll Come, They Come (2007)
- Moen (2009)
- In Passage (2011)
- Hibernation (2016)
- Structures (2019)
- Distance (2021)
- Woven Light (2026)

=== Guest appearances ===
- Sempiternal (Bring Me the Horizon) - backing vocals (2013)

== Members ==
- Claes Strängberg - vocals, guitar
- Per Strängberg - guitar
- David Lillberg - keyboards, piano
- Jonatan Josefsson - drums
