= Can You Feel My Heart =

Single by Bring Me the Horizon

from the album Sempiternal
- Released: 8 October 2013
- Recorded: 2012
- Genre: Hard rock; emo; electronica
- Length: 3:47
- Label: Sony; RCA; Epitaph
- Songwriters: Oliver Sykes; Lee Malia; Jordan Fish
- Producer: Terry Date

Bring Me the Horizon singles chronology
"Go to Hell, for Heaven's Sake" (2013)	"Can You Feel My Heart" (2013)	"Drown" (2014)

Music video
- "Can You Feel My Heart" on YouTube

Audio sample
- file; help

"Can You Feel My Heart" is a song by British rock band Bring Me the Horizon. Written by vocalist Oliver Sykes, guitarist Lee Malia and keyboardist Jordan Fish, it was produced by Terry Date and appears as the opening track on the band's 2013 fourth studio album Sempiternal. The song was also released as the fourth and final single from the album on 8 October 2013, reaching number five on the UK Rock & Metal Singles Chart.

== Promotion and release ==
The song was released in October 2013 as the fourth and final single from Sempiternal, backed with remixes of the song by Enter Shikari (under their "Shikari Sound System" alias) and electronic producer Jakwob. It was later included as the closing track on the band's first live video album, Live at Wembley, released in 2015, and is also featured on their second, 2016's Live at the Royal Albert Hall. In June 2014, "Can You Feel My Heart" was featured on the soundtrack of the video game EA Sports UFC.

== Composition and lyrics ==
"Can You Feel My Heart" was one of the first Bring Me the Horizon songs written with keyboardist Jordan Fish, prior to his official addition to the band in 2013. Speaking to Sugarscape.com, bassist Matt Kean recalled that "When we were writing this song it was the first time we kinda realised that Jordan ... was having a big impact on the writing", suggesting that it influenced the band's change in direction on the rest of Sempiternal. Vocalist Oliver Sykes confirmed this in a track-by-track feature with Metal Hammer, proclaiming that "This was the turning point; it was the first one that Jordan really got his teeth into, and obviously you can hear that because it’s very heavy on the electronica". The song's lyrics were written by Sykes, who has explained that it is "all about admittance, admitting you have a problem, and admitting something's wrong". Alternative Press labelled that this track is an emo song. Writing for Music Feeds, Mike Hohnen described that this track has also a combination of elements from electronic and hard rock. Further explaining the song, Sykes explained:

"'Can You Feel My Heart' is all about admittance, admitting you have a problem and admitting something's wrong, that's the first step of the whole album. In my life, I had to admit certain things to go further. They all deal with different topics."

== Music video ==
The music video for "Can You Feel My Heart", directed by Richard Sidwell and Alistair Legrand, was filmed in Los Angeles, California and released on 16 August 2013. The Guardian, who premiered the video, described it as "suitably ostentatious" for the song, outlining that it "follows a distressed looking man who is chased by evil beings wearing doctor masks of black Plague". Noisecreep's Amy Sciaretto added that the masked people "[stalk] and then [perform] an exploratory procedure on an unsuspecting young gentleman who bleeds thick, black blood", extracting something from his stomach. In a feature published in April 2015, Kerrang! ranked it the fifth best Bring Me the Horizon music video.

== Critical reception ==
Multiple critics praised "Can You Feel My Heart" as a good illustration of the album, in particular the presence of electronic elements driven by the addition of keyboardist Jordan Fish to the band. Dean Brown of PopMatters explained that "Where the swathes of artificial electronica on [previous album] There Is a Hell... sounded disengaged from the music, Jordan Fish's contributions here are seamlessly incorporated and audible from the bright beginnings of opener "Can You Feel My Heart"". BBC Music's Mike Diver noted that the track, alongside earlier single "Sleepwalking", "present[s] new, synthetic textures to the forefront of the BMTH mix". Other reviews published by AllMusic, Alternative Press and Exclaim! identified the Sempiternal opener as a highlight of the album. The Guardian writer Dom Lawson was less positive, criticising the song's "dubstep swagger and overwrought synths".

"Can You Feel My Heart" has also been included in several commentators' lists of the best Bring Me the Horizon songs – Alternative Press included it at number two on their list in May 2015, Loudwire ranked it at number six in May 2014, and AXS named it the seventh best in May 2015. Metal Hammer writer Luke Morton ranked it the fifth best song by the band, highlighting it as "the point the metal game changed" due to its use of electronics, which he claimed was "the finest use of electronics ever in a BMTH song". In 2019, Billboard ranked the song number eight on their list of the 10 greatest Bring Me the Horizon songs, and in 2022, Kerrang! ranked the song number six on their list of the 20 greatest Bring Me the Horizon songs.

== Commercial performance ==
"Can You Feel My Heart" debuted on the UK Rock & Metal Singles Chart at number 26 on 7 April 2013, following the release of Sempiternal. It later reached its peak position in the top five of the chart on 20 October, after it was released as the album's fourth and final single, and spent a total of 12 weeks in the top 40. The song re-entered the chart in January 2021, and climbed back to its peak position on 22 January 2021. In the United States, the single reached number 26 on the Billboard Mainstream Rock chart and number 39 on the Hot Rock Songs chart.

== In popular culture ==
In early 2021, the song gained popularity on the video sharing platform TikTok, possibly due to TikTok star Jeris Johnson remixing the song of his own accord and its users using the song for their videos. The song became widely used in various internet memes following its resurgence in popularity, in particular, memes featuring Russian bodybuilder and model Ernest Khalimov (also known as the "Giga Chad") and "ItzMeFraz". As a result, the song was ranked number one on Billboard's Hard Rock Streaming Songs, becoming the first song released after the year 2000 to achieve the feat. Johnson's remix caught the band's attention, with Sykes commenting "Holy shit we love this Jeris. Check ur inbox. Let's do something". The full song was released on 5 March 2021.

In 2023, "Can You Feel My Heart" was sampled in the song "Automotivo Bibi Fogosa" by Brazilian female singer Bibi Babydoll and sound producer DJ Brunin XM, which went viral on TikTok and topped the chart in Ukraine during the Russian invasion of Ukraine.

== Track listing ==
All songs written by Oliver Skyes, Lee Malia, and Jordan Fish.

Digital download
No.	Title	Length
1.	"Can You Feel My Heart"	3:48
2.	"Can You Feel My Heart" (Shikari Sound System remix)	4:24
3.	"Can You Feel My Heart" (Jakwob remix)	4:33
Total length:		12:45

7" picture disc
No.	Title	Length
1.	"Can You Feel My Heart"	3:49
2.	"Can You Feel My Heart" (Shikari Sound System remix)	4:26
Total length:		8:15

== Personnel ==
Personnel taken from Sempiternal liner notes.

Bring Me the Horizon

- Oli Sykes – vocals
- Lee Malia – guitars
- Matt Kean – bass
- Matt Nicholls – drums
- Jordan Fish – programming

Additional musicians

- Capital Voices – choir vocals

== Charts ==
Chart performance for "Can You Feel My Heart" (2013–15)
Chart (2013–15)	Peak position
UK Physical Singles (OCC)	8
UK Rock & Metal Singles (OCC)	5
US Hot Rock & Alternative Songs (Billboard)	39
US Mainstream Rock (Billboard)	26

Chart performance for "Can You Feel My Heart" (2021)
Chart (2021)	Peak position
Czech Republic Singles Digital (ČNS IFPI)	96
Global 200 (Billboard)	186
Slovakia (Singles Digitál Top 100)	94
UK Rock & Metal (Official Charts)	5

== Certifications ==
Certifications for "Can You Feel My Heart"
Region	Certification	Certified units/sales
Australia (ARIA) Jeris Johnson remix	2× Platinum	140,000^{‡}
Canada (Music Canada)	Platinum	80,000^{‡}
Germany (BVMI)	Gold	300,000^{‡}
Italy (FIMI)	Gold	50,000^{‡}
New Zealand (RMNZ)	Platinum	30,000^{‡}
Portugal (AFP)	Gold	10,000^{‡}
United Kingdom (BPI)	Platinum	600,000^{‡}
^{‡} Sales+streaming figures based on certification alone.
