= Sleepwalking (Bring Me the Horizon song) =

Single by Bring Me the Horizon

from the album Sempiternal
- Released: 1 March 2013
- Length: 3:50
- Label: Sony; RCA; Epitaph
- Songwriters: Oliver Sykes; Lee Malia; Jordan Fish; Jona Weinhofen
- Producer: Terry Date

Bring Me the Horizon singles chronology
"Shadow Moses" (2013)	"Sleepwalking" (2013)	"Go to Hell, for Heaven's Sake" (2013)

Music video
- "Sleepwalking" on YouTube

"Sleepwalking" is a song by British rock band Bring Me the Horizon. Written by the band's vocalist Oliver Sykes, guitarists Lee Malia and Jona Weinhofen, and keyboardist Jordan Fish, it was produced by Terry Date and appeared on the band's fourth studio album Sempiternal, released in 2013. The song was released as the second single from the album on 1 March 2013, reaching number three on the UK Rock & Metal Singles Chart.

== Promotion and release ==
"Sleepwalking" was released as a digital download on 1 March 2013, and was later released on 10" picture disc for Record Store Day in April. The song was featured as BBC Radio 1's "Hottest Record" on 28 February 2013. In addition to Sempiternal, the song was also featured on the band's debut live video album, 2015's Live at Wembley, as well as their second, 2016's Live at the Royal Albert Hall.

== Composition and lyrics ==
"Sleepwalking" has been noted by many commentators for its notably more mellow tone compared to Bring Me the Horizon's previous singles. Spencer Kaufman of Loudwire, for example, noted that the song "showcases [the band's] more melodic side", praising the "beautiful bridge in the middle of the track". Similarly, the ticket merchant AXS claimed that the song "showcased that [Bring Me the Horizon] could write more poppy songs that still maintained the aggressive style they have been known for", while Mike Hohnen of Music Feeds explained that the track "[hones] in on a far more mellow, ambient vibe". Speaking in a track-by-track overview of Sempiternal with Metal Hammer, the vocalist Oliver Sykes described "Sleepwalking" as "one of the more commercial songs on the record" and "one of [the band's] best-written songs".

According to Loudwire's Sarai C., "Sleepwalking" begins "with an electronic melody which evolves into a powerful minor chord progression, paired with Sykes' perfectly executed vocals", and also features some nu metal influence. Hohnen of Music Feeds noted that the track features a "dominant role" for keyboards, accompanied by irregular drum patterns. Gregory Adams of Exclaim! proposed that the style of the song "heads towards an electronics-assisted, Linkin Park-ish melancholia". Bram Teitelman of Metal Insider also compared the song's style to that of Linkin Park, criticising its lack of "heaviness" to some extent.

== Music video ==
The music video for "Sleepwalking" was released on 4 March 2013. Directed by A Nice Idea Every Day and Richard Sidwell, it depicts a sleepwalker "[traversing] wintery landscapes and a seagull-infested dock whilst in the land of nod", while Bring Me the Horizon "perform the somnambulist-inspired tune for a bunch of depressed pint-sippers in a pub". In the video, Bring Me the Horizon frontman Oliver Sykes is seen wearing a T-shirt featuring the logo of American death metal band Death.

== Critical reception ==
"Sleepwalking" received praise from the majority of music critics. Dan Slessor of Alternative Press identified the song, in addition to "Go to Hell, for Heaven's Sake" and "Seen It All Before" as a highlight of Sempiternal. BBC Music's Mike Diver proposed that "Sleepwalking" and opening track "Can You Feel My Heart" introduce "new, synthetic textures to the forefront of" the band's sound. Reviewing Sempiternal for PopMatters, Dean Brown praised the addition of Jordan Fish's keyboards to the band's sound, particularly on "Sleepwalking" and "And the Snakes Start to Sing", which he claimed "splash[ed] colour" onto the songs' "sparse sections".

In a list of the best Bring Me the Horizon songs published in May 2014, Sarai C. of the music website Loudwire ranked "Sleepwalking" as the band's third best track. The writer claimed that "it shows the outstanding musicianship that [the band] have developed", praising its electronic melody, chord progression and vocal performance. Alternative Press also ranked it at number three on their list of the group's top songs, hailing it as "a master class on how to write a song that will dominate rock radio without sacrificing any of your band's personality". Writer Dan Slessor claimed that it features "perhaps the most rousing chorus in [the band's] catalog, a stuttering breakdown ... a sublime bridge ... [and a] gigantic climax". AXS also included the song at number five on its list of the band's best tracks, while Metal Hammer writer Luke Morton ranked it the seventh best, praising its accessible and anthemic nature.

== Commercial performance ==
"Sleepwalking" debuted at number four on the UK Rock & Metal Singles Chart on 10 March 2013, before rising to its peak position of number three the following week. Outside of the UK, "Sleepwalking" reached number 14 on the US Billboard Mainstream Rock chart.

== Track listing ==
Digital download
No.	Title	Length
1.	"Sleepwalking"	3:50
2.	"Sleepwalking" (instrumental version)	3:50
Total length:		7:40

== Charts ==
Chart performance for "Sleepwalking"
Chart (2013–14)	Peak position
UK Singles (OCC)	122
UK Physical Singles (OCC)	48
UK Rock & Metal (Official Charts)	3
US Rock & Alternative Airplay (Billboard)	47

== Certifications ==
Certifications for "Sleepwalking"
Region	Certification	Certified units/sales
Australia (ARIA)	Platinum	70,000^{‡}
United Kingdom (BPI)	Gold	400,000^{‡}
^{‡} Sales+streaming figures based on certification alone.
