= Go to Hell, for Heaven's Sake =

Single by Bring Me the Horizon

from the album Sempiternal
- Released: 6 June 2013
- Genre: Metalcore; symphonic metal
- Length: 4:02
- Label: Sony; RCA; Epitaph
- Songwriter(s): Oliver Sykes; Lee Malia; Jordan Fish
- Producer(s): Terry Date

Bring Me the Horizon singles chronology
"Sleepwalking" (2013)	"Go to Hell, for Heaven's Sake" (2013)	"Can You Feel My Heart" (2013)

Music video
- "Go to Hell, for Heaven's Sake" on YouTube

"Go to Hell, for Heaven's Sake" is a song by British rock band Bring Me the Horizon. Written by vocalist Oliver Sykes, guitarist Lee Malia and keyboardist Jordan Fish, it was produced by Terry Date and featured on the band's 2013 fourth studio album Sempiternal. The song was also released as the third single from the album on 6 June 2013, reaching number 22 on the US Billboard Mainstream Rock chart.

== Promotion and release ==
The song was released as the third single from Sempiternal on 7" picture disc on 6 June 2013, backed with a remix of the song produced by Rogue. ClashMusic.com praised the remix as "the sort of once-over that'll have bass-heads beaming".

In addition to Sempiternal, "Go to Hell, for Heaven's Sake" was also featured on the band's debut live video album, 2015's Live at Wembley, as well as their second, 2016's Live at the Royal Albert Hall.

== Composition and lyrics ==
The writing and recording process for "Go to Hell, for Heaven's Sake" was slightly different to the normal approach adopted by Bring Me the Horizon – speaking to Sugarscape.com, bassist Matt Kean recalled that "for this one, instead of going into a room to jam and play the songs we would pre-record riffs or keyboard parts ... then if there was a good part we'd record it on the computer directly". Speaking about the song to Metal Hammer in a track-by-track commentary of Sempiternal, vocalist Oliver Sykes proclaimed that the band "were after a faster, more fun song to pick up the pace", calling it "probably the funnest track on the CD".

Noisecreep's Greg Srisavasdi claimed that "Go to Hell, for Heaven's Sake" is "an aggressive verbal attack on an unnamed recipient". Describing the style of the track, Loudwire's Joe DiVita outlined that "The song ... is a balance of softer moments and higher energy moments like the hook-laden chorus. Atmospheric synthesizers provide a somber atmosphere to the edgier lyrics that deal with loss and angst".

== Music video ==
The music video for "Go to Hell, for Heaven's Sake" was directed by Stuart Birchall and released on 5 September 2013. The video depicts the band performing in a chapel alongside imagery intended to illustrate the song's lyrics, including "empty swings swaying back and forth, a pin piercing a voodoo doll, religious symbols, and a raven sitting on a tree branch". Loudwire's Joe DiVita praised the band's "intense" performance in the video. An earlier video was released in August featuring footage of the band performing on the 2013 Warped Tour.

== Critical reception ==
"Go to Hell, for Heaven's Sake" reached number 22 on the Billboard Mainstream Rock chart. Dean Brown of PopMatters compared the style of "Go to Hell, for Heaven's Sake" to that of Linkin Park, praising the band for "rejuvenat[ing] the stale dynamic for the year 2013". Alternative Press identified the song as a highlight of Sempiternal. Loudwire ranked it the eighth best Bring Me the Horizon song in May 2014, hailing it as "a faultless representation of how the band has evolved over the past decade".

== Track listing ==
No.	Title	Length
1.	"Go to Hell, for Heaven's Sake"	4:03
2.	"Go to Hell, for Heaven's Sake" (Rogue remix)	4:48
Total length:		8:51

== Charts ==
Chart performance for "Go to Hell, for Heaven's Sake"
Chart (2013)	Peak position
UK Physical Singles (OCC)	26
US Mainstream Rock (Billboard)	22
