= It Never Ends =

Single by Bring Me the Horizon

from the album There Is a Hell Believe Me I've Seen It. There Is a Heaven Let's Keep It a Secret.
- Released: 20 August 2010
- Genre: Metalcore
- Length: 4:34
- Label: Visible Noise; Epitaph
- Songwriters: Oliver Sykes; Lee Malia; Jona Weinhofen; Matt Kean; Matt Nicholls
- Producers: Fredrik Nordström; Henrick Udd

Bring Me the Horizon singles chronology
"The Sadness Will Never End" (2009)	"It Never Ends" (2010)	"Visions" (2011)

Music video
- "It Never Ends" on YouTube

"It Never Ends" is a song by British rock band Bring Me the Horizon. Produced by Fredrik Nordström and Henrick Udd, it was featured on the band's 2010 third studio album There Is a Hell Believe Me I've Seen It. There Is a Heaven Let's Keep It a Secret. The song was released as the lead single from the album on 20 August 2010, and was the band's first song to chart when it reached number 103 on the UK Singles Chart, number 3 on the UK Rock & Metal Singles Chart and number 11 on the UK Independent Singles Chart.

== Promotion and release ==
Bring Me the Horizon released the first trailer for There Is a Hell... on 13 August 2010, which featured a clip of "It Never Ends". The song was released as the lead single from the album a week later, when it was made available for online streaming and digital download. According to set list aggregation website setlist.fm, "It Never Ends" is the sixth most-played song by Bring Me the Horizon.

After almost two years without a live performance by the band, "It Never Ends" was included in the set list at the band's landmark show at the Royal Albert Hall in April 2016 with the Parallax Orchestra and is featured on the live video album Live at the Royal Albert Hall. The song's performance at the Royal Albert Hall was praised by multiple critics: The Independent columnist Steve Anderson noted that "The live strings on [the song] added a richness to the blistering down-tuned intro while providing the perfect counterpoint to Sykes' guttural screams and chugging breakdown", while Tomas Doyle of Rock Sound highlighted it as the best song of the set.

== Composition and lyrics ==
The musical composition of "It Never Ends" is characterised by the use of choral vocals (performed by The Fredman Choristers) and electronic instruments: Metal Hammer writer Luke Morton claims that the track marks Bring Me the Horizon's "first foray into experimenting with high-end electronics and production". He also notes that the song's "punked-up, infectious, snarling chorus is juxtaposed early on by the ethereal choral vocals that float through the whole album". This contrast is described as a blend of "delicacy with brutality" by AbsolutePunk's Drew Beringer, who notes that the song "starts lightly" and features "chilling" choral vocals and orchestration which contribute to the "huge track".

Previewing There Is a Hell... for Metal Hammer, Terry Bezer outlined the arrangement of the song by explaining that "Thunderous fretwork over the top of luscious keyboard strings again give way to a full-throttle burst of pace". He also noted Matt Nicholls's "Thunderous, floor-shaking beating and double-bass pedal rolls", which he said "combine to create the feeling that rhinos are steamrollering across your chest". Beringer also highlighted the song's guitar riffs, describing them as "electrifying", while Morton called them "crunching" and "destructive". Bezer concluded his overview of "It Never Ends" by highlighting the "throat-shredding" vocals in the song's outro, which he described as "devastating".

Beringer claims that the lyrical content of "It Never Ends" relates to vocalist Oliver Sykes's "past struggles", while author Ben Welch suggests that the song's lyrics "reflect [a] sense of having fallen prey to the temptations of the fast life", pointing specifically to the music industry as the main influence. Loudwire columnist Sarai C. adds that the song "tells [Sykes's] story of dealing with his personal life and fame" and alludes to "the difficult time in his life where he felt his demons were overwhelming and ultimately incapacitating him". All Access magazine's Natalie Perez outlined that "the lyrics are filled with emotional regret with patches of sorrow that will forever remain open for the untold truth".

== Music video ==
The music video for "It Never Ends" was directed by Plastic Kid (an alias for Danish director Jakob Printzlau), who also produced the artwork for There Is a Hell... It was released in August 2010, at the same time as the single. Reviewing the video for the website Bloody Disgusting in 2013, Jonathan Barkan outlined that it "shows singer Oliver Sykes being driven in an ambulance to a rundown hospital, a gang of demonic, vampiric creatures in hot pursuit", adding that it is "filled with gore, cartoony visuals, gritty filters, and sharp editing". Offering a more detailed interpretation, biographer Ben Welch proposed that the figures pursuing Sykes in the video represent the music industry, including sex, business, the law, drugs and the press. Rock Sound praised the video as "insane", "bonkers" and "brilliant", while Kerrang writer Emily Carter ranked it the fourth best video released by the band as of April 2015.

== Critical reception ==
Media response to "It Never Ends" was widely positive. In the unofficial Bring Me the Horizon biography Heavy Sounds from the Steel City, author Ben Welch proposed that the song "was a perfect example of the expanded sound [the band] had been reaching for", praising the inclusion of "bruising riffing and agitated drum work" in addition to the "atmospheric" verses, "spine-tingling" choral vocals and "huge hook".

Prior to the album's release, Drew Beringer of AbsolutePunk proposed that "It Never Ends" was the band's "best song yet", while Metal Hammer writer Terry Bezer praised it for featuring "one of the best choruses of [Oliver Sykes's] career to date". John Longbottom of Kerrang! magazine described it as "probably BMTH's most banging, floor-filling, jam-pumping, pit-starting, sing-alonging-est-song". Sarai C. ranked it the seventh best song by the band as of May 2014, praising the use of the choir and string instruments to add "a dark ambiance to the sinister message" of the track, while Luke Morton of Metal Hammer included it at number 9 on his list of the band's best songs. In 2019, Billboard ranked the song number one on their list of the 10 greatest Bring Me the Horizon songs, and in 2022, Kerrang! ranked the song number seven on their list of the 20 greatest Bring Me the Horizon songs.

== Commercial performance ==
"It Never Ends" was the first song by Bring Me the Horizon to register on a chart, debuting at number 103 on the UK Singles Chart in the week of 4 September 2010. In the same week it also registered on the UK Rock & Metal Singles Chart at number 3, and on the UK Independent Singles Chart at number 11.

== Charts ==
Chart (2010)	Peak position
Australia Hitseekers (ARIA)	12
Scotland Singles (OCC)	81
UK Singles (OCC)	103
UK Independent Singles (OCC)	11
UK Rock & Metal (OCC)	3
