= Simon Dobson =

English composer (born 1981)

Simon Dobson (born 1981) is an English composer particularly noted for his brass band compositions.

== Biography ==
Dobson was born in Birmingham, England. Having grown up in a brass banding family, he was educated at Launceston College where he was taught by the influential Rob Strike. Dobson moved to London at age 18 on a scholarship to study composition under Timothy Salter, Theo Verby and George Benjamin, at the Royal College of Music.

While at college, Dobson wrote music for many different ensembles including, wind orchestra, string orchestra, percussion ensemble and the RCM symphony orchestra. He received his first commission, from the London Philharmonic Orchestra in 2002 during his second year of study. In 2004 he was a featured composer at the world-famous Three Choirs Festival and composed Sinewave, a contemporary work based on electronic music.

In 2002 Dobson also won the European Brass Band composers' competition in Brussels, which led to his being commissioned to write the test work for the 2003 English regional Fourth section brass band competition, Lydian Pictures. A number of other commissions followed including a work for the national youth brass band finals of Great Britain, including a march for the BBC Music Live festival, and Brass Band Heritage Trust.

At RCM, Dobson was part of a group of students who formed 'Zone One Brass', a championship section band which he conducted for four years before moving away from London in 2004 after earning his B.Mus and graduating to the sounds of his own fanfare.

In 2007, Simon Dobson wrote the set piece for the European Brass band championships 'B' section, and his work The Drop, (based on Drum 'n' Bass DJ techniques), has been performed a number of times in some major concert venues, including the Birmingham Symphony Hall.

He has been Composer in Residence with both the Leyland Band, the Brighouse and Rastrick and the Fairey Band.

Dobson also works as a freelance conductor and is well known for his work with youth ensembles and players. His conducting led him to coach many of London's championship standard bands, taking him nationwide, as well as to Norway for the Norwegian Brass band championships in the NM 2008–11 and Switzerland. He worked with former national youth champions Mount Charles Youth Band, as well as the Devon County Youth band and the Cornwall Youth Brass Band, for whom he wrote his composition Penlee.

Dobson played horn in the Dirty Pop band, 'Men of Splendour', performing all over England, playing festival crowds in excess of 10,000 people. As a conductor, he conducted 'Zone One Brass', his own band, including at Buckingham Palace. Dobson continues to compose many different types of music, such as Drum 'n' Bass, Dub, Jazz, Breakbeat and, more recently, animated film scores, as well as providing film music for timelapse film company, Lobster Pictures Ltd. His music is published by Faber, London. Dobson was the winner of the Denis and Maud Wright conducting award and now holds the post of Assistant Musical Director at the National Youth Brass Band of Great Britain, studying under Bramwell Tovey.

Simon Dobson has undertaken judging and adjudication work. He judged the 2010 Scottish open brass band championships in Perth; on this occasion he was judging performances of his own piece ... and when the river told .... He also judged the Swiss National Brass band championships in the Stravinsky hall in Montreux. In April 2011 he returned to Montreux with the Fairey (Geneva) Band to hear them perform the world première of his latest composition 'A Symphony of Colours' at the European Brass Band Championships.

In May 2011 Dobson's work Penlee (based on the Penlee lifeboat disaster) was voted in at number 106 in the Classic FM Hall of Fame. It was the highest new entry of any genre and Dobson was the seventh highest living composer in the 300-strong list. This work has been used worldwide as a test piece in brass band competitions; it was the set work for the Swiss national finals and the North American championships.

Dobson has played trumpet for various funk/soul/jazz and hip hop bands, working for producers across the southwest and recording studio sessions for bands such as The King Blues. He appears on three of the album tracks on their new album Punk & Poetry and produced the track 5 Bottles of Shampoo. The album charted at number 31 in the UK charts.

Dobson has received various commissions, notably from the Fairey (Geneva) Brass Band to compose 'A Symphony of Colours' for their entry to the European Brass Band Championships. Upcoming works include 'Another World's Hell' for a major brass and wind festival in Switzerland and performances at the RNCM festival of brass as well as performances at the 2013 Australian Brass Band Championships in Perth.

He performs as part of 'The Badcore Horns', a session horns for hire collective of which he is a founding member. Recently they have recorded for various artist such as Granville Sessions, Madness, Jag Harps, We are the Ocean, Dry The River, Electric Swing Circus, Canterbury, Kat Marsh, Andreas Moe, Luke Concannon, Lazy Habits and many more.

In 2012 Simon Won a British Composer of the year Award (BASCA) for his work 'A Symphony of Colours', and in 2014 Simon prepares to release his first solo album 'Euneirophrenia'.

In October 2014 Simon will see the premier of his first feature-length film soundtrack. Commissioned by the British Film Institute for the 105 minute long WWI epic 'The Battles of Coronel and the Falkland Islands'. The soundtrack will be performed to film by live orchestra during the Archive Gala concert of the London Film Festival at the Queen Elizabeth Hall.

On April 22, 2016, Dobson conducted the Parallax Orchestra accompanying Bring Me the Horizon at the Teenage Cancer Trust concerts at the Royal Albert Hall in London. The show's overture At the Earth's Curve was entirely composed by Dobson, and the show marked the first time for Bring Me the Horizon to ever play live with an orchestra and choir.

On October 2 and 3, 2017, Dobson also conducted the Parallax Orchestra who accompanied Alter Bridge at the Royal Albert Hall in London. Besides conducting the orchestra, Dobson also contributed in creating orchestral arrangements for several of songs in the band catalog.

== Awards ==
- 1997, Winner, Brass Section, Cornwall Young Composer Competition
- 2002, Winner, European Composers' Competition, Brussels, Belgium
- 2002, Newcomer of the Year, 4BarsRest
- 2012, British Composer of the Year Award (Brass Band/Wind Band), BASCA
- 2014, British Composer of the Year Award (Brass Band/Wind Band), BASCA
