= Sempiternal =

Studio album by Bring Me the Horizon
- Released: 1 April 2013
- Recorded: June–September 2012
- Studios: Angelic Studio in Brackley, Northamptonshire
- Genres: Metalcore; post-hardcore; alternative rock; electronicore; hard rock; alternative metal
- Length: 45:31
- Labels: RCA; Epitaph
- Producer: Terry Date

Bring Me the Horizon chronology
The Chill Out Sessions (2012)	Sempiternal (2013)	Live at Wembley (2015)

Singles from Sempiternal
- 1. "Shadow Moses" Released: 11 January 2013; 2. "Sleepwalking" Released: 1 March 2013; 3. "Go to Hell, for Heaven's Sake" Released: 6 June 2013; 4. "Can You Feel My Heart" Released: 8 October 2013

Sempiternal is the fourth studio album by British rock band Bring Me the Horizon. It was released on 1 April 2013 worldwide through RCA Records, a subsidiary label of Sony Music, and 2 April 2013 in the United States and Canada through Epitaph Records. It is the first album to feature former Worship keyboardist Jordan Fish and the first with guitarist Lee Malia playing both lead and rhythm parts.

Written and recorded throughout 2012, Sempiternal showed the band pull diverse influences from nu metal, electronic music, ambient music and pop. "Sempiternal" is an archaic English word denoting the concept of "everlasting time" that can never actually come to pass. It stems from the Latin word "sempiternus" (a concatenation of root "semper" and suffix "aeternum").

The album spawned four singles ("Shadow Moses"; "Sleepwalking"; "Go to Hell, for Heaven's Sake"; and "Can You Feel My Heart"). The album made its debut at No. 3 on the UK Album Chart and is their second successive album to top the ARIA Charts in Australia. It also managed to reach No. 11 on the US Billboard 200 with 27,522 first week sales, making Sempiternal the band's highest-charting album in America until That's the Spirit debuted at No. 2 in 2015. Upon its release, the album received critical acclaim.

== Background ==
In 2011, Bring Me the Horizon were finishing up the tour that was held in support of the band's previous album There Is a Hell Believe Me I've Seen It. There Is a Heaven Let's Keep It a Secret. Afterward, they had intentions to issue a remix extended play consisting of electronica remixes of tracks off the album, all done by British electronic producer Draper, aiming for a tentative January 2012 release. However, because of the band's situation with their then-label Visible Noise, it was cancelled. Later that year, in July, it was announced that the band would be releasing their fourth album on RCA Records.

Although the band's split from Visible Noise wasn't strictly aggressive, the band wanted to join a major record label due to the lack of resources and support an independent label could offer during the album's development and promotion. An example of this is where front-man Oliver Sykes and his brother, Tom, who directed the movie wanted to release a "behind-the-scenes" documentary of Bring Me the Horizon's tour called "Lads on Tour". This was to be a part of a re-release of their third album. However, this didn't happen as Visible Noise couldn't pay for certain parts of the film. RCA Records have given Bring Me the Horizon lengthy support since their signing, the label introduces their signing of Bring Me the Horizon with the statement "signing you is as important as signing Metallica".

== Writing and recording ==
Most albums we go away somewhere remote and record. It didn't work out as well for us this time because we liked that before as we were always touring, and we needed somewhere quiet to go. But this time, we had a bit of time to chill out before that, so we didn't need it as much. It took us so long to get into the writing process this time because we had that massive tour, and we hadn't written for so long. It takes a while each time – a few months – to find that first song, and be like 'this is it', because we always start off by believing that this album is going to be completely different to the last, but we never know why, and we never have that vision, but it's always about finding that first song that's going to represent the album, and that took us a while.

— Singer Oliver Sykes in an interview.

In 2012, the band decided to stop both their touring and media appearances, choosing to fully focus on writing and recording their next album. Rhythm guitarist Jona Weinhofen is quoted as saying "we're not very good at getting motivated to write on tour". The album was written in the Lake District, this keeps with the band's tradition of favouring isolation to write their music. Previous examples of where they've written was Arboga, Sweden for Suicide Season and rural Scotland for There Is a Hell. They felt that they didn't need the isolated environment as much since they had a couple of months to rest after the tour for their previous album. However this posed as an obstacle for the band as they had too long of a break from song writing. The band initially wanted to begin recording the album in May 2012, however, Sykes believed it was too soon and that the band should just demo for a few months instead.

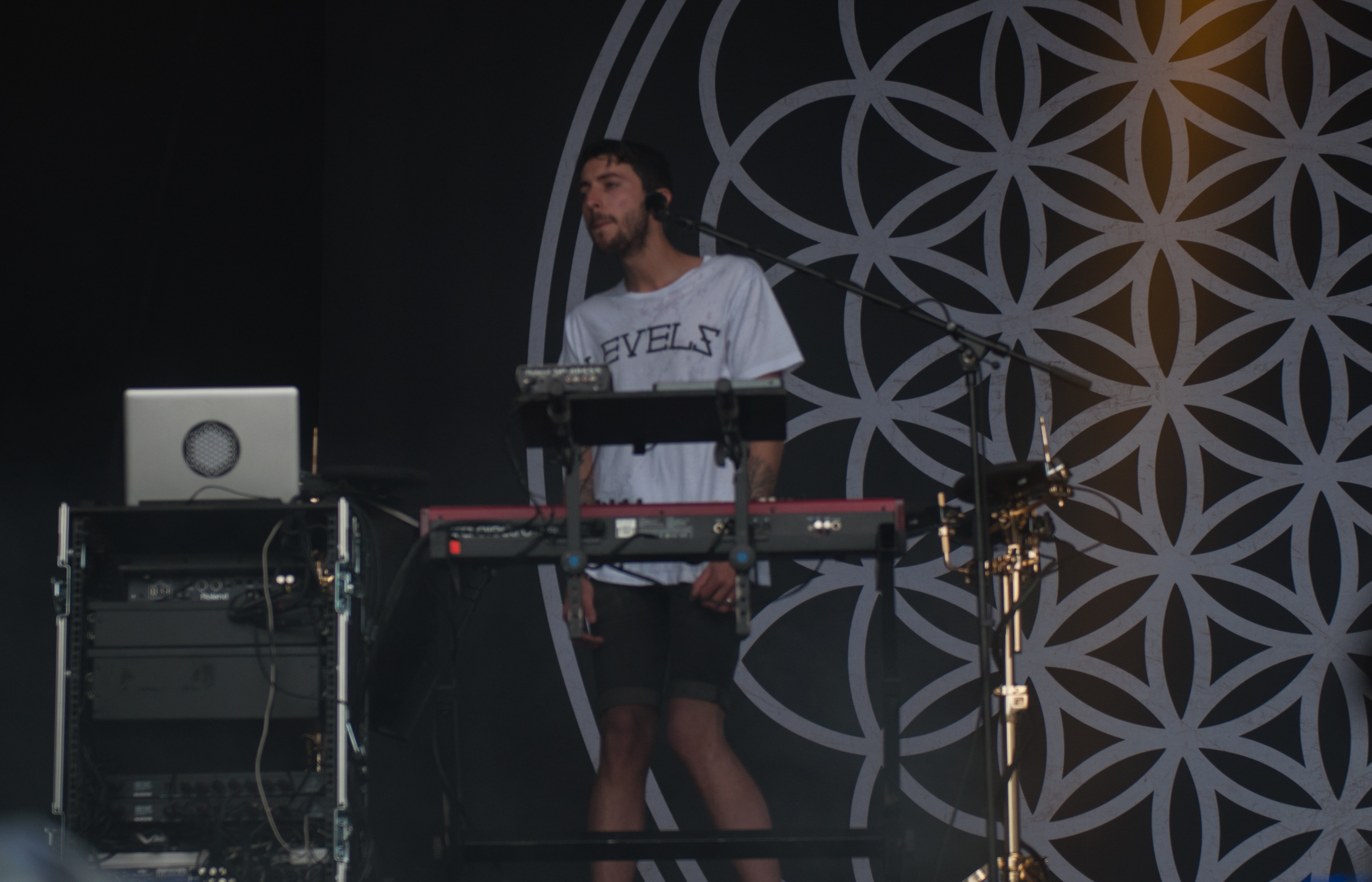
Jordan Fish originally joined the group as a session musician. But his role grew to having a significant role in Sempiternal's sound.

The band posted several images of themselves recording at a Top Secret Studio Location, which was later revealed to be the Angelic Studio in Banbury, Oxfordshire. The band announced that by September they would be entering the studio for pre-production of the album. In an interview with The Guardian Sykes stated that a majority of the album was recorded on his laptop.

Vocalist Oli Sykes revealed in an interview with Kerrang! that Jordan Fish of Worship had been working closely with Bring Me the Horizon in the studio, helping write the album and contribute electronics. His role developed over the course of writing the album as he was initially there to be instructed by the band in what to do but he slowly started to have more say in the album's writing. As his role continued he eventually became "essential" to the framework of the album and that he became "one of the leaders in terms of composition". Sykes has said how both Fish, lead guitarist Lee Malia and himself would spend days writing in his own home. Throughout the development of the album he was never announced as an official member of the band but would tour with the band in support of Sempiternal. However, in early 2013 Rock Sound magazine confirmed Fish had left Worship and joined Bring Me the Horizon to become a six piece band. By the middle of September it was announced that Terry Date, who is known for his work with bands like Deftones, Limp Bizkit and Pantera would be the album's producer. Sykes said he admires Date's production work shown on White Pony and Chocolate Starfish and the Hot Dog Flavored Water. Sykes believes that some of the work Date has done on the band's production makes Bring Me the Horizon sound like a completely different band.

Although the band had previously worked with other artists (like Canadian synthpop artist Lights) the band decided against introducing guest, except for members of post-rock band Immanu El who did backing vocals across the album. On 3 November 2012, the band invited fans and the Drop Dead Clothing team to enter Angelic Studios to record the gang vocals for Sempiternal. Jordan Fish acted as a conductor for the crowd. Guitarist Jona Weinhofen left the band before the release of Sempiternal in 2013, but contributed guitar parts that were included on the album. and was present for the first live performance of Shadow Moses at The Leadmill in Sheffield in 2012

== Composition ==
=== Influences, style and themes ===
Despite Sykes' doubts about joining a major record label and how it would affect the band's musical output (believing they would try to convince Bring Me the Horizon to release something more radio friendly), RCA and Sony pushed the band to "write the heaviest album they can". However, instead of going for a heavier sound, Bring Me the Horizon pooled more diverse influences in preparation for the writing of Sempiternal. During the development of the album, Sykes said that he and Jordan Fish were inspired by all the music they heard throughout their daily life and thought about how it applied to their style. Taking influence from ambient music, dance, reggae, pop music, nu metal and both the soundscapes and "weird pianos" from film soundtracks. Sykes had stated specifically that Danny Boyle films like 28 Days Later and The Beach were influences, saying: "Before we [Bring Me the Horizon] wrote the album, we would play his 28 Days Later theme tune." The album is also seen as taking the electronic elements that have progressively surfaced in the band's career and incorporating them into the foundation of the songs.

The album has been cited as metalcore, post-hardcore, alternative rock, electronicore, hard rock, and alternative metal, and has been cited as having a more "pop rock sound" while having a "metalcore edge".

Describing the album as blending pieces of their previous three albums and then creating "a whole new sound" Sykes summarises the album as having been "massively" influenced by various electronic music genres. He also commented on how the album would explore similar territory as their third album There Is a Hell. This was due to the fact that the ground covered by the album gave room for further experimentation. The sound of the album is seen as still being as aggressive as their typical work but having choruses that are "made for arenas" and a lot of electronic-influenced hooks. Sykes also sees the album as possessing a very euphoric "happy sad" feeling and this is shown where one of the tracks on the album surfaced to sound like the soundtrack to the end of the world.

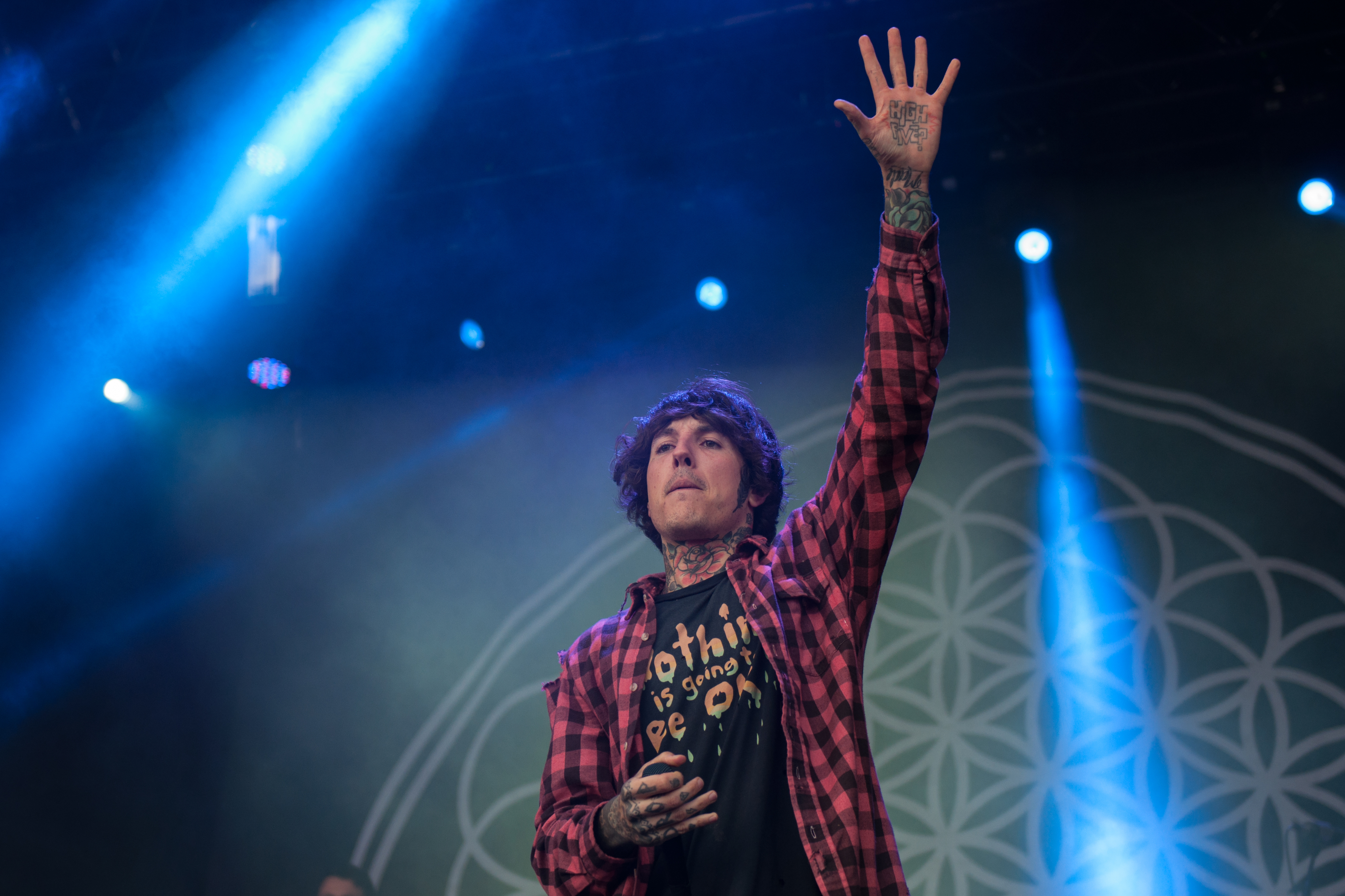
The lyrics on Sempiternal mainly deal with Sykes' journey through rehabilitation from ketamine.

The album's track listing is arranged to fuel a conceptual interpretation. The album, which is penned by Sykes, is lyrically more positive and tongue-in-cheek in comparison to the dark lyricisms of the previous album, There Is a Hell. The album's lyrics are also focused on self-reflective themes of analysing the consequences of someone's actions on people's lives and transforming them into apologies and described as having "a more considerate, contemplative and self-aware demeanour". Sykes explained that while There Is a Hell examined mannerisms such as dealing with great amounts of depression, Sempiternal examines learning how to deal with that stress. Despite the proclaimed positivity of the album in an interview with Kerrang! magazine where they review the songs track by track Sykes makes several references to "a problem" which cohesively binds the tracks themes together. The lyrics are also cited as possessing anti-religious connotations, with Sykes summarising this by saying "I'm an atheist so it's all about not believing in God. Before the album I was put in a position where I was asked to believe in God to get better, I was in a shitty place and I was asked to put my faith in God". The lyrical structure is also seen as following a "yin-and-yang". Heard in songs like "Can You Feel My Heart", where the lyrics polarise with "the higher I get, the lower I sink".

=== Tracks ===
The introductory song "Can You Feel My Heart" was a musical experiment which helped sculpt the style of Sempiternal. The song was the first song which Fish "really got his teeth into" which is shown in the heavy use of electronica. The song's looped vocal pattern was created by Fish as Sykes couldn't think of lyrics that fit in the chorus, but they then became a significant part of the song's structure. The song starts with cascading walls of electronica breaking into a mid-tempo song. The song is credited by Sykes as "admitting you have a problem, and admitting some thing's wrong. That's the first step of the whole album."

"The House of Wolves" is a song about Sykes dealing with pressures to become religious to help overcome personal problems. Lee Malia described the song as having a more Suicide Season inspired sound and having a Glassjaw-influenced chorus.

The song on the album titled "Antivist" was reportedly written about former guitarist Jona Weinhofen. The first time it was played, Sykes made the following statement: "This song is called 'Antivist.' It goes out to Jona Weinhofen." However, in later interviews when asked directly about the song and its meaning the band members revealed that its not strictly about Weinhofen (although he did serve as an inspiration), but rather deals with modern-day people's hypocrisy, particularly on the Internet; where people either state reckless negative opinions and argue with other people which "not actually helping" or on the contrary preach whatever they feel is right to change the world for the better while at the same time behaving in a manner that belies their own statements (thus making them "ANTI-vists" instead of activists).

== Promotion and release ==
On 5 November 2012, the band announced that they had hosted a website domain for the album sempiternal.info in which they release an audio clip of "Shadow Moses" and displayed a video which eventually forms a symbol which became a part of the album's cover art. This was the Flower of Life, a geometric design consisting of overlapping circles, and is the main feature of its album cover. On 9 November, the band played a free gig in their home town of Sheffield before co-headlining the UK Warped Tour Festival in London with Lostprophets. On 14 January 2013, an "Album Teaser" video was released on Bring Me the Horizon's Vevo account. At the end of this video it was revealed that the album was scheduled to be released on 29 April 2013. All formats/editions of the album can be pre-ordered. Several different packages are available, with some including a t-shirt.

On 23 February 2013, Sempiternal was leaked onto the internet two months before the release date. This, however, received a positive response from the band as they prepared something due to the "phenomenal demand". This then led to the band streaming the album online until its release date, which was pushed forward from 29 and 30 April to 1 and 2 April for Worldwide and North American release, respectively. When asked about the leak of Sempiternal, Sykes commented by saying: "I'd make a play for it happening because I was so sure. Music is free now, if you don't want to pay for music then you don't pay for music. Everyone takes that privilege. As a musician you've got to accept that nowadays."

=== Singles ===
The first single from the album, "Shadow Moses", debuted on Daniel P. Carter's Rock Show on BBC Radio 1 on 4 January 2013. "Shadow Moses" was officially released as a single on iTunes on 14 January 2013, reaching No. 80 in the Official UK Singles Chart, their first top 100 entry. On 18 February 2013, the band announced that they will release the song "Antivist" as a new song, given that enough people tweet #antivist. The new song's artwork was displayed in .GIF format on the website antivistreveal.com. On 19 February 2013, "Antivist" was released on SoundCloud and YouTube. Prior to its promotional release, the song was not a single.

On 4 March 2013, the band released the second music video from Sempiternal which was "Sleepwalking" on YouTube via the band's Vevo channel and Epitaph Record's channel. The band announced on their Facebook and Twitter pages that their third single would be "Go to Hell, for Heaven's Sake" and would officially release the song as a single on 10 June.

=== Tours and performances ===
Bring Me the Horizon embarked on their headline tour of the United States in support of Sempiternal. The tour, known as The American Dream Tour had permanent support from Of Mice & Men and Issues, while Letlive were the opening act for the majority of the tour and Northlane opened on 11 of the dates in their absence.

They finished their last Sempiternal show on 5 December 2014 at the Wembley Arena. This marked the end of the Sempiternal-focused era of Bring Me the Horizon and the break they used to make a new album.

== Reception ==
=== Critical reception ===
Professional ratings
Aggregate scores
Source	Rating
Metacritic	81/100
Review scores
Source	Rating
AbsolutePunk	(80%)
AllMusic	4/5 stars
Alternative Press	4.5/5 stars
Classic Rock	3.5/5 stars
Kerrang!	5/5
Loudwire	4.5/5 stars
Metal Hammer	4.5/5 stars
NME	(8/10)
PopMatters	7/10 stars
Shields Gazette	(7/10)

Upon its release, the album was met with critical acclaim. At Metacritic, which assigns a normalised rating out of 100 to reviews from mainstream music critics, the album received an average score of 81, based on 12 reviews, which indicates "universal acclaim".

AllMusic gave the album a positive review saying, "Bring Me the Horizon have been working slowly but surely to refine their sound for years now, and with Sempiternal, it feels like their patience and hard work are finally beginning to pay dividends." In a positive review of the album, Drew Beringer of AbsolutePunk said the album "has just as much substance as it has style." In a positive review, Alternative Press praised Sykes' vocals saying, "Sykes' increased vocal range also proves a formidable addition to their arsenal" calling the album "cohesive and engaging."

Classic Rock complemented the album's more "genuine" calling the album "[more] dramatic and emotional than...ever have before." Kerrang! gave the album a positive review writing that, "Sempiternal sounds like a record that wants the world – that's all of it, not just the bits where longhairs dwell – which is refreshing for a metal record in 2013."

In 2023, a decade after the release, Metal Hammer described Sempiternal as "the most influential metal album of its generation", stating that it was the album that "rewrote the narrative around Bring Me The Horizon, and that took them to greatness." In 2024, John Hill of Loudwire named it the best metalcore album of 2013. It was cited as the band's best album by Bryan Rolli of Loudwire in 2025.

=== Accolades ===
Publication	Country	Accolade	Year	Rank
Metal Hammer	UK	100 Greatest Metal Albums of the 21st Century	2016	3
Kerrang!	UK	The 25 Best Rock Albums of 2013	2014	1
Metal Hammer	UK	Top 50 Albums of 2013	2013	6
Alternative Press	US	10 Essential Albums of 2013	2013	9
musicOMH	UK	Top 100 Albums of 2013	2013	65
Loudwire	US	Best Metal Album of 2013 – 3rd Annual Loudwire Music Awards	2013	—N/a

Awards

Year	Nominee / work	Award	Result
2013 Kerrang! Awards	Bring Me the Horizon	Best Album	Nominated
2014 Alternative Press Awards	Bring Me the Horizon	Best Album	Won

== Commercial performance ==
The album debuted in the United Kingdom at number three on the album chart and number one on the rock chart with over 9,000 copies sold in its first week. In the US, projections of the album selling between 24,000 and 27,000 in its first week were confirmed as it sold over 27,000, achieving a place of number 11 on the US Billboard 200. The album was certified gold by the RIAA on 26 April 2016 for surpassing 500,000 sales though the RIAA misspelled the band's name and certified the album as "Beyond the Horizon".

== Track listing ==
All tracks are written by Oliver Sykes, Lee Malia and Jordan Fish, with additional co-writers where noted.

No.	Title	Writer(s)	Length
1.	"Can You Feel My Heart"		3:47
2.	"The House of Wolves"		3:25
3.	"Empire (Let Them Sing)"		3:45
4.	"Sleepwalking"	Jona Weinhofen	3:50
5.	"Go to Hell, for Heaven's Sake"		4:02
6.	"Shadow Moses"		4:03
7.	"And the Snakes Start to Sing"		5:01
8.	"Seen It All Before"		4:07
9.	"Antivist"		3:13
10.	"Crooked Young"		3:34
11.	"Hospital for Souls"		6:44
Total length:			45:31

Deluxe edition bonus disc – The Deathbeds EP
No.	Title	Length
1.	"Join the Club"	3:06
2.	"Chasing Rainbows"	4:00
3.	"Deathbeds" (featuring Hannah Snowdon)	4:57
Total length:		12:03

Japanese edition bonus tracks
No.	Title	Length
12.	"Join the Club"	3:06
13.	"Deathbeds" (featuring Hannah Snowdon)	4:57
14.	"Sleepwalking" (Instrumental)	3:50
Total length:		57:24

iTunes deluxe edition bonus tracks
No.	Title	Length
12.	"Join the Club"	3:06
13.	"Chasing Rainbows" (US iTunes deluxe edition exclusive)	4:00
14.	"Deathbeds" (featuring Hannah Snowdon)	4:57
15.	"The Studio Tapes" (iTunes deluxe edition exclusive video)	12:29
Total length:		1:10:03

== Personnel ==
Personnel taken from Sempiternal liner notes.

Bring Me the Horizon

- Oli Sykes – vocals
- Lee Malia – guitar
- Matt Kean – bass
- Matt Nicholls – drums
- Jordan Fish – programming
- Jona Weinhofen – guitar (6)

Additional personnel

- Terry Date – production, recording
- Kevin Mills – engineering
- Tom A.D. Fuller – additional engineering
- Luke Gibbs – assistant engineering
- David Bendeth – mixing
- Brian Robbins – mixing, digital editing
- Mitch Milan – digital editing
- Dan Graziano – digital editing
- Ted Jensen – mastering

Additional musicians

- Capital Voices – choir vocals (tracks 1, 6 and 10)
- Chris Clad – violin (tracks 6 and 10)
- Dermot Crehan – violin (tracks 6 and 10)
- Freddie August – violin (tracks 6 and 10)
- Peter Hanson – violin (tracks 6 and 10)
- Alex Balanescu – violin (tracks 6 and 10)
- Simon Fisher – violin (tracks 6 and 10)
- Manon Derome – violin (tracks 6 and 10)
- Virginia Slater – viola (tracks 6 and 10)
- Katie Wilkinson – viola (tracks 6 and 10)
- Tim Grant – viola (tracks 6 and 10)
- Martin Loveday – cello (tracks 6 and 10)
- Vikki Mathews – cello (tracks 6 and 10)
- Andy Saiker – gang vocals (tracks 2–7, 9 and 11)
- Ed Fenwick – gang vocals (tracks 2–7, 9 and 11)
- Adam Day – gang vocals (tracks 2–7, 9 and 11)
- Katherine Parrott – gang vocals (tracks 2–7, 9 and 11)
- Mike Plews – gang vocals (tracks 2–7, 9 and 11)
- Sarah Lewin – gang vocals (tracks 2–7, 9 and 11)
- Nesta Rixon – gang vocals (tracks 2–7, 9 and 11)
- Mara Rixon – gang vocals (tracks 2–7, 9 and 11)
- Reece Coyne – gang vocals (tracks 2–7, 9 and 11)
- Luka Spiby – gang vocals (tracks 2–7, 9 and 11)
- Dave Holland – gang vocals (tracks 2–7, 9 and 11)
- Emma Taylor – gang vocals (tracks 2–7, 9 and 11)
- Jenny Millard – gang vocals (tracks 2–7, 9 and 11)
- Yazmin Beckett – gang vocals (tracks 2–7, 9 and 11)
- Jack Beakhust – gang vocals (tracks 2–7, 9 and 11)
- Glen Brown – gang vocals (tracks 2–7, 9 and 11)
- Demi Scott – gang vocals (tracks 2–7, 9 and 11)
- Julia Beaumont – gang vocals (tracks 2–7, 9 and 11)
- Chloe Mellors – gang vocals (tracks 2–7, 9 and 11)
- Janice Nicholls – gang vocals (tracks 2–7, 9 and 11)
- Damien Bennett – gang vocals (tracks 2–7, 9 and 11)
- Richard Nicholls – gang vocals (tracks 2–7, 9 and 11)
- Corey Leary – gang vocals (tracks 2–7, 9 and 11)
- Tom Sykes – gang vocals (tracks 2–7, 9 and 11)
- Brendan Dooney – gang vocals (tracks 2–7, 9 and 11)
- Chris Stokes – gang vocals (tracks 2–7, 9 and 11)
- Jonathon Shaw – gang vocals (tracks 2–7, 9 and 11)
- Sam Hudson – gang vocals (tracks 2–7, 9 and 11)
- Jade Higgins – gang vocals (tracks 2–7, 9 and 11)
- Brigitta Metaxas – gang vocals (tracks 2–7, 9 and 11)
- Ian Sykes – gang vocals (tracks 2–7, 9 and 11)
- Carol Sykes – gang vocals (tracks 2–7, 9 and 11)
- Daniel Stokes – gang vocals (tracks 2–7, 9 and 11)
- Jack Jones – gang vocals (tracks 2–7, 9 and 11)
- Jordan Rudge – gang vocals (tracks 2–7, 9 and 11)
- Jake O'Neill – gang vocals (tracks 2–7, 9 and 11)
- Brad Wood – gang vocals (tracks 2–7, 9 and 11)
- Alex Fisher – gang vocals (tracks 2–7, 9 and 11)
- Suzanne Malia – gang vocals (tracks 2–7, 9 and 11)
- Dave Malia – gang vocals (tracks 2–7, 9 and 11)
- Gill Malia – gang vocals (tracks 2–7, 9 and 11)
- Ian Middleton – gang vocals (tracks 2–7, 9 and 11)
- Claes and Per Strängberg of Immanu El – additional vocals (tracks 4, 6, 7, 8 and 11)
- Hannah Snowdon – guest vocals on "Deathbeds"

== Charts ==
=== Weekly charts ===
Weekly chart performance for Sempiternal
Chart (2013)	Peak position
Australian Albums (ARIA)	1
Austrian Albums (Ö3 Austria)	17
Belgian Albums (Ultratop Flanders)	149
Belgian Albums (Ultratop Wallonia)	200
Canadian Albums (Billboard)	22
Finnish Albums (Suomen virallinen lista)	10
French Albums (SNEP)	84
German Albums (Offizielle Top 100)	22
Irish Albums (IRMA)	33
Japanese Albums (Oricon)	142
New Zealand Albums (RMNZ)	10
Norwegian Albums (VG-lista)	27
Scottish Albums (Official Charts)	5
Swedish Albums (Sverigetopplistan)	32
Swiss Albums (Schweizer Hitparade)	69
UK Albums (Official Charts)	3
UK Album Downloads (Official Charts)	4
UK Rock & Metal Albums (Official Charts)	1
US Billboard 200	11
US Independent Albums (Billboard)	2
US Top Alternative Albums (Billboard)	2
US Top Hard Rock Albums (Billboard)	5
US Top Rock Albums (Billboard)	3

Chart (2026)	Peak position
Greek Albums (IFPI)	88
Hungarian Physical Albums (MAHASZ)	37

=== Year-end charts ===
Year-end chart performance for Sempiternal
Chart (2013)	Position
Australian Albums (ARIA)	69
UK Albums (OCC)	163
US Top Rock Albums (Billboard)	67
US Top Hard Rock Albums (Billboard)	27

== Certifications ==
Certifications for Sempiternal
Region	Certification	Certified units/sales
Australia (ARIA)	Platinum	70,000^{‡}
Canada (Music Canada)	Gold	40,000^{‡}
Germany (BVMI)	Gold	100,000^{‡}
New Zealand (RMNZ)	Gold	7,500^{‡}
Poland (ZPAV)	Platinum	20,000^{‡}
United Kingdom (BPI)	Platinum	300,000^{‡}
United States (RIAA)	Gold	500,000^{‡}
^{‡} Sales+streaming figures based on certification alone.
