= Shadow Moses (song) =

Single by Bring Me the Horizon

from the album Sempiternal
- Released: 11 January 2013
- Genre: Metalcore
- Length: 4:03
- Label: Sony; RCA; Epitaph
- Songwriters: Oliver Sykes; Lee Malia; Jordan Fish
- Producer: Terry Date

Bring Me the Horizon singles chronology
"Visions" (2011)	"Shadow Moses" (2013)	"Sleepwalking" (2013)

Music video
- "Shadow Moses" on YouTube

"Shadow Moses" is a song by British rock band Bring Me the Horizon. Written by vocalist Oliver Sykes, guitarist Lee Malia and keyboardist Jordan Fish, it was produced by Terry Date and featured on the band's 2013 fourth studio album Sempiternal. The song was released as the lead single from the album on 11 January 2013, reaching number 82 on the UK Singles Chart and number 2 on the UK Rock & Metal Singles Chart.

One of the first songs written for Sempiternal, "Shadow Moses" features the use of the album's title several times throughout the song. The track is named after the main setting of the 1998 video game Metal Gear Solid, the closing theme of which is referenced in the song's opening vocal line. "Shadow Moses" was critically acclaimed upon its release and is one of the band's most frequently-performed songs at live shows.

== Promotion and release ==
"Shadow Moses" received its worldwide premiere on BBC Radio 1's Rock Show with Daniel P. Carter on 4 January 2013, before it was released as the lead single from Sempiternal the following week in the form of a digital download. Due to the popularity of the song, the band's North American label Epitaph Records uploaded it to their YouTube channel a week earlier than they had planned. In addition to Sempiternal, the song was also featured on the band's debut live video album, 2015's Live at Wembley, as well as their second, 2016's Live at the Royal Albert Hall. In October 2015, "Shadow Moses" was featured as a playable song on the music video game Guitar Hero Live.

== Composition and lyrics ==
"Shadow Moses" was originally written with the intention of possibly releasing it for free prior to the release of Sempiternal, according to Bring Me the Horizon vocalist Oliver Sykes, before management reportedly opposed the idea and encouraged the band to save it for the album. Both Sykes and drummer Matt Nicholls have described it as "the 'safest' track on the album".

The song's chorus features the line "Can you tell from the look in our eyes? We're going nowhere! We live our lives like we're ready to die! We're going nowhere!", which upon its release in January 2013 Loudwire's Chad Childers claimed had "already worked masterfully as an audience call-and-response in the band's recent live performances". It also includes the title of the album in the phrase "This is sempiternal!", which when linked to the "We're going nowhere!" line produces "a rather dreary thought", according to Childers. The song features two references to the 1998 video game Metal Gear Solid – the title is a reference to the game's main setting, and the opening choral vocal line is based on "The Best Is Yet to Come", the game's closing theme (originally performed by Aoife Ní Fhearraigh).

The song also features the album title in the lyric "This is sempiternal!". The line has famously been misheard as "This is sandpit turtle!", leading to an Internet meme. Matt Nicholls stated in an interview with MTV UK that "Someone texted me it and I thought it was the funniest thing I'd ever heard, and then went to tell the guys they were all like... 'Yeah we know, everyone's saying it!'"

Childers described the musical style of "Shadow Moses" as featuring "the requisite force, aggression and driving guitar work that one would expect from Bring Me the Horizon, along with a chorus that's incredibly infectious". According to mixing engineer David Bendeth, the song was always intended to be released as the album's lead single, and accordingly was the first song from the collection completed.

== Music video ==
The music video for "Shadow Moses" was released on 22 January 2013. Directed by German duo A Nice Idea Every Day and filmed on the island of Rügen, it depicts the band performing against a number of "stark backdrops [including] a snow-covered field [and] an ocean shore in winter", filmed with a "quick-cutting camera trick" that produces the feeling of motion sickness. The filming technique, known as "camera shift", is described as producing "a mesmerising and unbalancing side to side motion". Reception to the video was positive – Loudwire's Chad Childers described it as "unique", "striking" and "eye-catching", while Marc Zanotti of Music Feeds praised it for "capturing the single's aggressive energy".

== Critical reception ==
Many critics hailed "Shadow Moses" as one of the best songs on Sempiternal. Artistdirect's Rick Florino awarded the song 4.5 out of 5 stars, proclaiming that it "rips and stomps with a laser-sighted precision that undeniably hits the mark over and over again". PopMatters writer Dean Brown dubbed it "one of Sempiternal's heaviest additions", praising guitarist Lee Malia's "Slipknot-esque riffs" and frontman Oliver Sykes's vocals. Dom Lawson of The Guardian also praised Sykes's performance on "Shadow Moses".

In May 2014, Loudwire named it the best Bring Me the Horizon song to date, claiming that the track "revolutionised not only [the band's] reputation in metalcore, but the genre itself". AXS and Alternative Press also included "Shadow Moses" in their features on the band's top songs, at #2 and #10, respectively.

"Shadow Moses" was nominated for Best Single and Best Video at the 2013 Kerrang! Awards, although lost out to Fall Out Boy's "The Phoenix" and Pierce the Veil's "King for a Day", respectively. The song was voted as the second best single of 2013 by Alternative Press readers, and was also nominated for Song of the Year at the Revolver Golden Gods Awards 2014, although "Lift Me Up" by Five Finger Death Punch ultimately won.

== Commercial performance ==
"Shadow Moses" debuted at its peak position of number two on the UK Rock & Metal Singles Chart on 20 January 2013. It remained in the top 40 throughout February and March, returning to the top 10 upon the release of Sempiternal in April. The single also spent two weeks on the UK Singles Chart, peaking at number 82.

== Charts ==
Chart performance for "Shadow Moses"
Chart (2013)	Peak position
Scottish Singles Sales (Official Charts)	86
UK Singles (Official Charts)	82
UK Rock & Metal (Official Charts)	2

== Certifications ==
Certifications for "Shadow Moses"
Region	Certification	Certified units/sales
Australia (ARIA)	Platinum	70,000^{‡}
United Kingdom (BPI)	Silver	200,000^{‡}
^{‡} Sales+streaming figures based on certification alone.
