= Bring Me the Horizon discography =

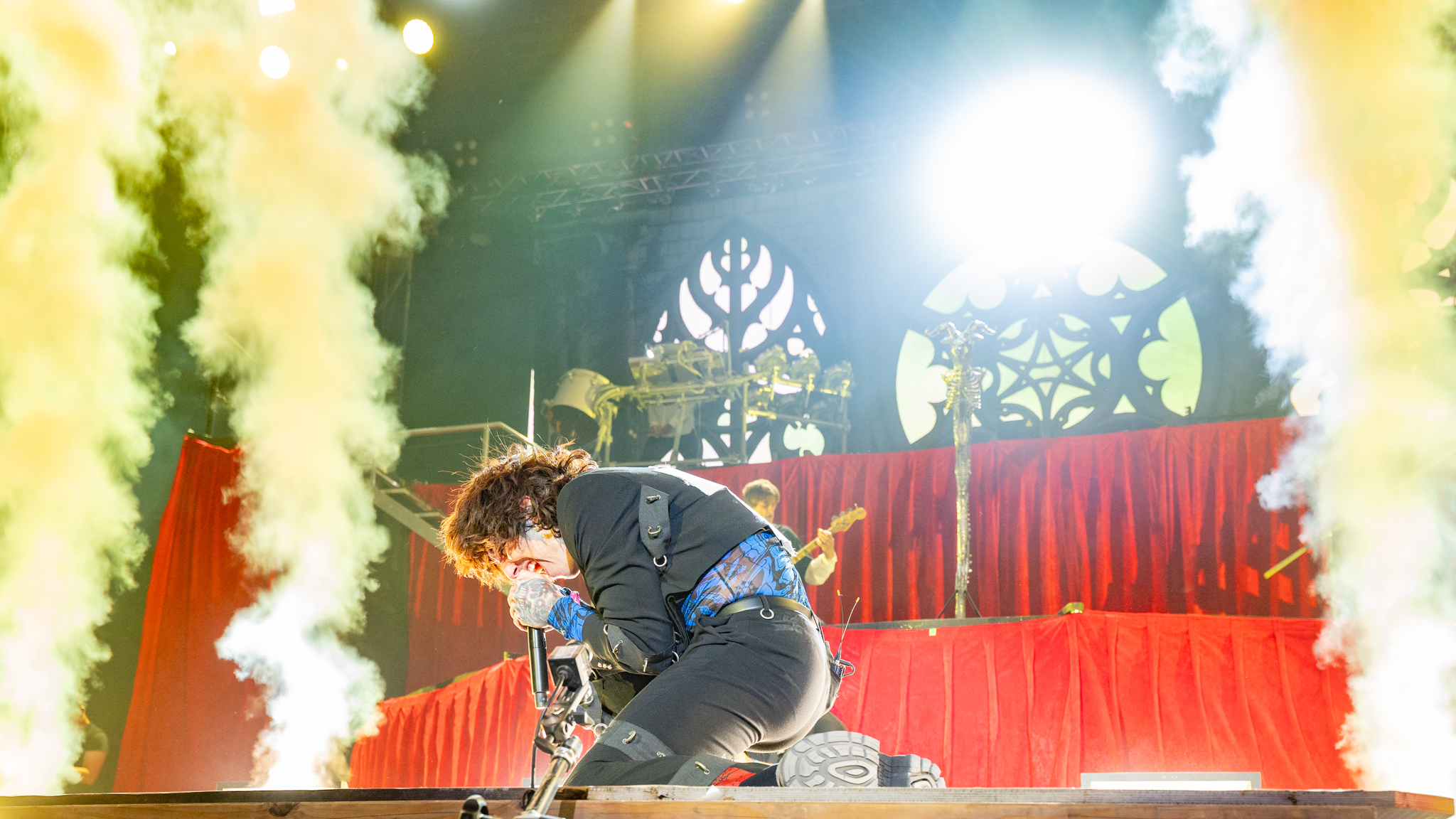
- Bring Me the Horizon at Rock im Park (2023)
- Studio albums: 7
- Extended plays: 2
- Live albums: 3
- Compilation albums: 3
- Singles: 48
- Video albums: 3
- Music videos: 42
- Promotional singles: 1
- Remix albums: 2
- Demo albums: 1
- Other releases: 2
- Other appearances: 3

British rock band Bring Me the Horizon have released seven studio albums, three live albums, three compilation albums, two remix albums, two extended plays (EPs), one demo album, 48 singles, one promotional single, three video albums, 42 music videos, two other releases and three other appearances. Formed in Sheffield, United Kingdom in 2004 by vocalist Oliver Sykes, guitarists Lee Malia and Curtis Ward, bassist Matt Kean, and drummer Matt Nicholls, the band released their debut EP This Is What the Edge of Your Seat Was Made For on Thirty Days of Nights Records in 2005, which reached number 41 on the UK Budget Albums Chart. After signing with British independent record label Visible Noise, the group released their debut full-length studio album Count Your Blessings in 2006, which reached the top 100 of the UK Albums Chart and the top 10 of the UK Rock & Metal Albums Chart. The 2008 follow-up Suicide Season reached the UK top 50 and charted in the United States for the first time when it reached number 107 on the Billboard 200. In November 2009, an expanded version of the album titled Suicide Season Cut Up! was released, featuring remixes and videos.

Ward left the band in early 2009 and was replaced by Jona Weinhofen. The new lineup released There Is a Hell Believe Me I've Seen It. There Is a Heaven Let's Keep It a Secret. in 2010, which reached number 13 on the UK Albums Chart and number 17 on the US Billboard 200. The album's lead single "It Never Ends" was also the band's first to chart, reaching number 103 on the UK Singles Chart, while the track "Blessed with a Curse" reached the top 10 of the UK Rock & Metal Singles Chart. Weinhofen left the group in early 2013 and was replaced by keyboardist Jordan Fish. Now signed with RCA Records and Sony Music, Bring Me the Horizon released their fourth album Sempiternal a few months later, which reached number three on the UK Albums Chart and was certified gold in the United Kingdom, the United States, and Australia. Three singles from the album—"Sleepwalking", "Go to Hell, for Heaven's Sake", and "Can You Feel My Heart"—reached the top 30 of the US Mainstream Rock Songs chart. The band's debut EP and first three albums were later released as a limited edition vinyl box set in November 2014.

In 2014, the group released the single "Drown", which was the band's first to reach the top 20 of the UK Singles Chart and top the UK Rock & Metal Singles Chart. A re-recorded version of "Drown" was later included on the band's fifth album That's the Spirit, which was released in September 2015 and peaked at number two in both the UK and the US. Four further singles—"Happy Song", "Throne", "True Friends", and "Follow You"—later topped the UK Rock & Metal Singles Chart. The band's first live video album, Live at Wembley, was also released in 2015. Live at the Royal Albert Hall, recorded in April 2016 with a full orchestra, followed in December 2016. The band released the singles "Mantra" and "Wonderful Life" in August and October 2018, respectively, while the singles "Medicine", "Mother Tongue", and "Nihilist Blues" were released in January 2019. Bring Me the Horizon's sixth studio album Amo was released on 25 January 2019. The album continues Bring Me the Horizon's progression into the genres of pop rock, hard rock, alternative rock, and electronic rock, while also incorporating elements of pop and electronica. Amo would become Bring Me the Horizon's first UK chart topper on the UK Albums Chart by debuting at number one and eventually be certified gold in their home country by the BPI.

Post Human: Survival Horror would continue this trend by peaking at number one in the UK after being released on physical formats on 22 January 2021. This would chart higher after debuting at number five in October 2020 solely on digital formats. Post Human: Survival Horror got certified silver in the UK in the backend of July 2021, as well as gifting Bring Me the Horizon three UK top 40 hits in 2020 with the likes of "Parasite Eve", their highest-charting single since "Drown" in 2014, debuting at number 28 on the UK Singles Chart. "Obey", a collaboration with British rock singer Yungblud, and "Teardrops" being the other singles from the record to debut and peak within the top 40 on the UK Singles Chart. Despite not being released as a single, the song "Kingslayer", a collaboration with Japanese metal band Babymetal, has become a critical and commercial success, charting at number 51 on the UK Singles Chart and receiving sales certifications in several countries.

== Albums ==
=== Studio albums ===
List of studio albums, with selected chart positions and certifications
Title	Album details	Peak chart positions										Sales	Certifications
Title	Album details	UK	AUS	AUT	CAN	FIN	GER	IRL	NZ	SWE	US	Sales	Certifications
Count Your Blessings	Released: 30 October 2006; Label: Visible Noise, Earache; Formats: CD, DL, LP	93	—	—	—	—	—	—	—	—	—	UK: 62,204	BPI: Silver
Suicide Season	Released: 18 November 2008; Label: Visible Noise, Epitaph; Formats: CD, CD+, DL, LP	47	28	—	—	—	—	—	—	27	107	EU: 75,000	BPI: Silver
There Is a Hell Believe Me I've Seen It. There Is a Heaven Let's Keep It a Secret.	Released: 4 October 2010; Label: Visible Noise, Epitaph; Formats: CD, DL, LP, USB	13	1	48	22	—	52	72	—	30	17	UK: 54,105; AUS: 3,600; US: 20,200	BPI: Gold
Sempiternal	Released: 1 April 2013; Label: RCA, Epitaph; Formats: CD, DL, LP	3	1	17	22	10	22	33	10	32	11	UK: 108,914; US: 283,000	BPI: Platinum; ARIA: Platinum; BVMI: Gold; MC: Gold; RIAA: Gold; RMNZ: Gold
That's the Spirit	Released: 11 September 2015; Label: Sony, Columbia, RCA; Formats: CD, DL, LP	2	1	4	1	9	6	4	2	3	2	UK: 442,686	BPI: Platinum; ARIA: Platinum; BVMI: Gold; GLF: Gold; MC: Gold; RIAA: Gold; RMNZ: Gold
Amo	Released: 25 January 2019; Labels: Sony, RCA; Format: CD, CS, DL, LP, USB	1	1	5	12	7	3	15	9	16	14	UK: 100,424	BPI: Gold
Post Human: Nex Gen	Released: 24 May 2024; Label: Sony, RCA; Formats: CD, CS, DL, LP	2	2	2	37	17	4	26	8	27	36	UK: 122,658	BPI: Gold; ARIA: Gold
"—" denotes a release that did not chart or was not issued in that region.

=== Live albums ===
List of live albums, with selected chart positions
Title	Album details	Peak chart positions				
Title	Album details	UK	UK Down	AUS	AUT	GER
Live at Wembley	Released: 22 June 2015; Labels: Live Here Now, RCA, Sony; Formats: BR, CD, DVD-V	—	—	—	—	—
Live at the Royal Albert Hall	Released: 2 December 2016; Labels: Live Here Now, RCA, Sony; Formats: BR, CD, DVD-V, DL, LP	—	87	—	—	—
L.I.V.E. in São Paulo	Released: 10 April 2026; Labels: RCA, Sony; Formats: BR, CD, DVD-V, DL, LP	55	—	19	5	6

=== Compilation albums ===
List of compilation albums, with selected chart positions and certifications
Title	Album details	Peak chart positions			Certifications
Title	Album details	SCO	UK Sales	UK Rock	Certifications
Count Your Blessings / This Is What the Edge of Your Seat Was Made For	Released: 29 April 2009; Label: Earache; Formats: CD, EP, LP	—	—	—	
Limited Edition Vinyl Box Set	Released: 24 November 2014; Label: Visible Noise; Format: LP	—	—	—	
2004–2013	Released: 24 November 2017; Labels: Epitaph, BMG; Formats: CD, DL, LP	99	67	7	BPI: Gold
"—" denotes a release that did not chart or was not issued in that region.

=== Remix albums ===
List of remix albums, with selected chart positions
Title	Album details	Peak chart positions						
Title	Album details	UK	UK Dance	UK Down.	UK Indie	UK Indie Break	AUS	US
Suicide Season Cut Up!	Released: 2 November 2009; Label: Visible Noise; Formats: CD+, CD+DVD-V	120	8	98	12	3	—	165
Lo-files	Released: 11 July 2025; Label: Sony; Formats: DL, 2×LP	—	—	34	—	—	91	—

=== Re-recorded albums ===
List of re-recorded albums
Title	Album details	Peak chart positions										Sales
Title	Album details	UK	AUS	AUT	BEL (FL)	FIN	GER	NL	NZ	SCO	SWE	Sales
Count Your Blessings | Repented	Released: 10 July 2026; Label: Sony; Formats: CD, DL, CS, LP	6	5	3	6	19	2	13	24	4	9	UK: 11,327

== Extended plays ==
List of extended plays, with selected chart positions
Title	Extended play details	Peak chart positions
Title	Extended play details	UK Bud.
This Is What the Edge of Your Seat Was Made For	Released: 25 September 2004; Label: Thirty Days of Night, Visible Noise; Formats: CD, DL, 12"	41
The Chill Out Sessions (collaboration with Draper)	Released: 22 November 2012; Label: None (self-released); Format: DL	—

== Other commercial releases ==
List of commercial releases, with selected chart positions
Title	Release details	Peak chart positions										Sales	Certifications
Title	Release details	UK	AUS	AUT	CAN	FIN	GER	IRL	NZ	SWE	US	Sales	Certifications
Music to Listen To...	Released: 27 December 2019; Labels: Sony, RCA; Format: DL	— (Note: Music to Listen To... did not enter the UK Albums Chart, but peaked at number 24 on the UK Album Downloads Chart.)	— (Note: Music to Listen To... did not enter the Australian Albums Chart, but peaked at number 11 on the Australian Digital Albums.)	—	—	—	—	—	—	—	—		
Post Human: Survival Horror	Released: 30 October 2020; Labels: Sony, RCA; Formats: CD, DL, LP	1	3	7	31	7	4	31	19	28	46	UK: 140,464	BPI: Gold
"—" denotes a release that did not chart or was not issued in that region.

== Singles ==
=== As lead artist ===
List of singles as lead artist, with selected chart positions, showing year released and album name
Title	Year	Peak chart positions										Certifications	Album
Title	Year	UK	UK Rock	AUS	BEL (FL)	CZ	GER	HUN	NZ Hot	SCO	US Rock	Certifications	Album
"Pray for Plagues"	2007	—	—	—	—	—	—	—	24	—	—		Count Your Blessings
"For Stevie Wonder's Eyes Only (Braille)"	2008	—	—	—	—	—	—	—	—	—	—		Count Your Blessings
"It Never Ends"	2010	103	3	— (Note: "It Never Ends" did not enter the ARIA Singles Chart, but peaked at number 12 on the Australia Hitseekers chart.)	—	—	—	—	—	81	—		There Is a Hell Believe Me I've Seen It. There Is a Heaven Let's Keep It a Secret.
"Visions"	2011	—	—	—	—	—	—	—	—	—	—		There Is a Hell Believe Me I've Seen It. There Is a Heaven Let's Keep It a Secret.
"Shadow Moses"	2013	82	2	—	—	—	—	—	—	86	—	BPI: Silver; ARIA: Platinum	Sempiternal
"Sleepwalking"	2013	122	3	—	—	—	—	—	—	—	— (Note: "Sleepwalking" did not enter the Hot Rock & Alternative Songs chart, but peaked at number 47 on the Rock Airplay chart.)	BPI: Gold; ARIA: Platinum	Sempiternal
"Go to Hell, for Heaven's Sake"	2013	— (Note: "Go to Hell, for Heaven's Sake" did not enter the UK Singles Chart, but peaked at number 26 on the UK Physical Singles Chart.)	—	—	—	—	—	—	—	—	— (Note: "Go to Hell, for Heaven's Sake" did not enter the Hot Rock & Alternative Songs chart, but peaked at number 22 on the Mainstream Rock chart.)		Sempiternal
"Can You Feel My Heart" (Solo or Jeris Johnson remix)	2013	— (Note: "Can You Feel My Heart" did not enter the UK Singles Chart, but peaked at number 8 on the UK Physical Singles Chart.)	5	—	—	96	— (Note: "Can You Feel My Heart" did not enter the German Singles Chart, but peaked at number 13 on the Deutsche Single Trend Chart.)	—	—	—	39	BPI: Platinum; AFP: Gold; ARIA: 2× Platinum; BVMI: Gold; MC: Platinum; RMNZ: Platinum	Sempiternal
"Drown"	2014	17	1	27	— (Note: "Drown" did not enter the Flanders Ultratop 50, but peaked at number 30 on the Ultratip chart.)	—	90	38	—	11	11	BPI: Gold; ARIA: Platinum; PMB: Gold	That's the Spirit
"Happy Song"	2015	55	1	68	—	—	—	—	—	35	19	BPI: Gold; ARIA: Platinum; PMB: Gold	That's the Spirit
"Throne"	2015	51	1	58	— (Note: "Throne" did not enter the Flanders Ultratop 50, but peaked at number 29 on the Ultratip chart.)	—	—	—	—	39	12	BPI: Platinum; ARIA: 2× Platinum; BVMI: Gold; MC: Gold; PMB: Platinum; RMNZ: Platinum	That's the Spirit
"True Friends"	2015	91	1	—	— (Note: "True Friends" did not enter the Flanders Ultratop 50, but peaked at number 74 on the Ultratip chart.)	—	—	—	—	—	22	BPI: Silver; ARIA: Platinum; PMB: Gold	That's the Spirit
"Follow You"	2016	95	1	—	— (Note: "Follow You" did not enter the Flanders Ultratop 50, but peaked at number 32 on the Ultratip chart.)	—	—	—	—	—	34	BPI: Silver; AMPROFON: Gold; ARIA: Gold; PMB: Gold	That's the Spirit
"Avalanche"	2016	97	7	—	— (Note: "Avalanche" did not enter the Ultratip Singles Chart, but charted as an "extra tip" on the Ultratip Bubbling Under chart.)	—	—	—	—	—	—	BPI: Silver; ARIA: Gold	That's the Spirit
"Oh No"	2016	166	10	—	—	43	—	—	—	—	—		That's the Spirit
"Mantra"	2018	55	1	113	— (Note: "Mantra" did not enter the Flanders Ultratop 50, but peaked at number 7 on the Ultratip chart.)	93	— (Note: "Mantra" did not enter the German Singles Chart, but peaked at number 10 on the Deutsche Alternative Singles Chart.)	14	35	45	15	BPI: Silver; ARIA: Platinum; PMB: Gold	Amo
"Wonderful Life" (featuring Dani Filth)	2018	— (Note: "Wonderful Life" did not enter the UK Singles Chart, but peaked at number 89 on the UK Singles Sales Chart.)	8	—	— (Note: "Wonderful Life" did not enter the Flanders Ultratop 50, but peaked at number 30 on the Ultratip chart.)	—	—	—	—	83	33	ARIA: Gold; PMB: Gold	Amo
"Medicine"	2019	42	2	—	— (Note: "Medicine" did not enter the Ultratip Singles Chart, but charted as an "extra tip" on the Ultratip Bubbling Under chart.)	—	— (Note: "Medicine" did not enter the German Singles Chart, but peaked at number 14 on the Deutsche Single Trend Chart.)	—	20	56	9	BPI: Silver; ARIA: Gold; PMB: Gold	Amo
"Mother Tongue"	2019	68	4	—	— (Note: "Mother Tongue" did not enter the Ultratip Singles Chart, but charted as an "extra tip" on the Ultratip Bubbling Under chart.)	16	—	—	27	—	23	PMB: Gold	Amo
"Nihilist Blues" (featuring Grimes)	2019	77	5	—	—	—	—	—	29	—	45		Amo
"Sugar Honey Ice & Tea"	2019	—	14	—	—	—	—		36	—	47	PMB: Gold	Amo
"In the Dark"	2019	—	15	—	—	—	—	—	34	—	48	PMB: Gold	Amo
"Ludens"	2019	75	2	— (Note: "Ludens" did not enter the ARIA Singles Chart, but peaked at number 37 on the ARIA Digital Track Chart.)	—	—	—	14	35	53	13	ARIA: Gold; PMB: Gold	Post Human: Survival Horror
"Parasite Eve"	2020	28	1	82	— (Note: "Parasite Eve" did not enter the Ultratip Singles Chart, but charted as an "extra tip" on the Ultratip Bubbling Under chart.)	48	— (Note: "Parasite Eve" did not enter the German Singles Chart, but peaked at number 4 on the Deutsche Single Trend Chart.)	7	13	17	10	BPI: Silver; ARIA: Gold; PMB: Gold; RIAA: Gold	Post Human: Survival Horror
"Obey" (with Yungblud)	2020	37	1	99	— (Note: "Obey" did not enter the Ultratip Singles Chart, but charted as an "extra tip" on the Ultratip Bubbling Under chart.)	—	—	39	29	31	21	BPI: Silver; ARIA: Gold	Post Human: Survival Horror
"Teardrops"	2020	39	1	— (Note: "Teardrops" did not enter the ARIA Singles Chart, but peaked at number 42 on the ARIA Digital Track Chart.)	— (Note: "Teardrops" did not enter the Ultratip Singles Chart, but charted as an "extra tip" on the Ultratip Bubbling Under chart.)	99	— (Note: "Teardrops" did not enter the German Singles Chart, but peaked at number 6 on the Deutsche Single Trend Chart.)	—	23	62	16	BPI: Silver; ARIA: Gold; PMB: Gold; RIAA: Gold	Post Human: Survival Horror
"Die4U"	2021	41	1	— (Note: "Die4U" did not enter the ARIA Singles Chart, but peaked at number 27 on the ARIA Digital Track Chart.)	—	—	— (Note: "Die4U" did not enter the German Singles Chart, but peaked at number 10 on the Deutsche Single Trend Chart.)	—	27	×	23		Post Human: Nex Gen
"Strangers"	2022	60	6	— (Note: "Strangers" did not enter the ARIA Singles Chart, but peaked at number 32 on the ARIA Digital Track Chart.)	—	53	— (Note: "Strangers" did not enter the Official German Charts, but peaked at number 5 on the German Rock Airplay Chart.)	—	36	×	28	BPI: Silver; PMB: Gold	Post Human: Nex Gen
"Lost"	2023	29	1	— (Note: "Lost" did not enter the ARIA Singles Chart, but peaked at number 19 on the ARIA New Music Singles Chart.)	—	—	— (Note: "Lost" did not enter the Official German Charts, but peaked at number 22 on the German Rock Airplay Chart.)	—	10	×	22	BPI: Silver; PMB: Gold	Post Human: Nex Gen
"Amen!" (featuring Lil Uzi Vert and Daryl Palumbo)	2023	— (Note: "Amen!" did not enter the UK Singles Chart, but peaked at number 43 on the UK Singles Sales Chart.)	—	— (Note: "Amen!" did not enter the ARIA Singles Chart, but peaked at number 48 on the ARIA Digital Track Chart.)	—	—	—	—	35	×	42		Post Human: Nex Gen
"Darkside"	2023	31	2	— (Note: "Darkside" did not enter the ARIA Singles Chart, but peaked at number 23 on the ARIA Digital Track Chart.)	—	—	— (Note: "Darkside" did not enter the Official German Charts, but peaked at number 9 on the German Rock Airplay Chart.)	—	17	×	42	BPI: Silver; PMB: Gold	Post Human: Nex Gen
"Kool-Aid"	2024	21	1	— (Note: "Kool-Aid" did not enter the ARIA Singles Chart, but peaked at number 18 on the ARIA Digital Track Chart.)	—	—	— (Note: "Kool-Aid" did not enter the German Singles Chart, but peaked at number 14 on the Deutsche Single Trend Chart.)	—	5	×	25	BPI: Silver	Post Human: Nex Gen
"Top 10 Statues That Cried Blood"	2024	41	2	—	—	—	—	—	13	×	37		Post Human: Nex Gen
"Wonderwall" (Oasis cover)	2025	—	30	—	—	—	—	—	—	×	— (Note: "Wonderwall" did not enter the US Hot Rock & Alternative Songs chart, but peaked at number 11 on the Hot Hard Rock Songs chart.)		Spotify Singles
"Black & Blue"	2026	—	—	—	—	—	—	—	23	×	— (Note: "Black & Blue" did not enter the US Hot Rock & Alternative Songs chart, but peaked at number 9 on the Hot Hard Rock Songs chart.)		Count Your Blessings: Repented
"Dehumanized"	2026	— (Note: "Dehumanized" did not enter the UK Singles Chart or the UK Singles Sales Chart, but peaked at number 91 on the UK Singles Downloads Chart.)	11	— (Note: "Dehumanized" did not enter the ARIA Singles Chart, but peaked at number 45 on the ARIA Digital Track Chart.)	—	—	—	—	11	×	— (Note: "Dehumanized" did not enter the US Hot Rock & Alternative Songs chart, but peaked at number 1 on the Hot Hard Rock Songs chart.)		Count Your Blessings: Repented
"—" denotes a release that did not chart or was not issued in that region. "x" denotes periods where charts no longer exist or were archived.

=== As featured artist ===
List of singles as featured artist, showing year released and album name
Title	Year	Peak chart positions										Certifications	Album
Title	Year	UK	AUS	AUT	BEL (FL)	CAN	CZ	GER	US	US Rock	WW	Certifications	Album
"Let's Get the Party Started" (Tom Morello featuring Bring Me the Horizon)	2021	—	—	—	—	—	—	—	—	— (Note: "Let's Get the Party Started" did not enter the US Hot Rock & Alternative Songs but peaked at number 25 on the Hot Hard Rock Songs chart.)	—		The Atlas Underground Fire
"Bad Habits" (Ed Sheeran featuring Bring Me the Horizon)	2022	—	—	—	—	—	—	—	—	19	—		= (Tour edition)
"Maybe" (Machine Gun Kelly featuring Bring Me the Horizon)	2022	39	38	40	—	36	30	68	68	6	69	BPI: Silver; MC: Gold	Mainstream Sellout
"Fallout" (Masked Wolf featuring Bring Me the Horizon)	2022	— (Note: "Fallout" did not enter the UK Singles Chart, but peaked at number 29 on the UK Rock & Metal Singles Chart.)	—	—	—	—	—	—	—	— (Note: "Fallout" did not enter the US Hot Rock & Alternative Songs, but peaked at number 14 on the Hot Hard Rock Songs chart.)	—		Non-album single
"Bad Life" (Sigrid featuring Bring Me the Horizon)	2022	50	—	—	49	—	9	— (Note: "Bad Life" did not enter the German Singles Chart, but peaked at number 77 on the Deutsche Digital Singles Chart.)	—	—	—	BPI: Silver	How to Let Go
"Wish I Could Forget" (with Slander and Blackbear)	2023	—	—	—	—	—	—	—	—	— (Note: "Wish I Could Forget" did not enter the US Hot Rock & Alternative Songs, but peaked at number 19 on the Hot Dance/Electronic Songs chart.)	—		Non-album singles
"Code Mistake" (with Corpse)	2023	—	—	—	—	—	—	—	—	35	—		Non-album singles
"Werewolf" (Lil Uzi Vert featuring Bring Me the Horizon)	2023	— (Note: "Werewolf" did not enter the UK Singles Chart, but peaked at number 19 on the UK Rock & Metal Singles Chart.)	—	—	—	—	—	—	81	5	—		Pink Tape
"Slave to the Rithm" (with Illenium)	2026	—	—	—	—	—	—	—	—	—	—		Odyssey
"—" denotes a release that did not chart or was not issued in that region.

=== Promotional singles ===
List of promotional singles as lead artist, showing year released and album name
Title	Year	Album
"Antivist"	2013	Sempiternal

== Other charted and certified songs ==
List of charted songs, with selected chart positions, showing year released, album name and certifications
Title	Year	Peak chart positions							Certifications	Album
Title	Year	UK	UK Indie	UK Rock	UK Stre.	BEL (FL)	NZ Hot	US Rock	Certifications	Album
"Fuck" (featuring Josh Franceschi)	2010	—	—	25	—	—	—	—		There Is a Hell Believe Me I've Seen It. There Is a Heaven Let's Keep It a Secret.
"Blessed with a Curse"	2011	—	41	9	—	—	—	—		There Is a Hell Believe Me I've Seen It. There Is a Heaven Let's Keep It a Secret.
"Deathbeds" (featuring Hannah Snowdon)	2013	—	—	33	—	—	—	—		Sempiternal
"Doomed"	2015	87	—	4	62	—	—	41	BPI: Silver; AMPROFON: Gold; ARIA: Gold	That's the Spirit
"What You Need"	2015	118	—	—	88	— (Note: "What You Need" did not enter the Ultratip Singles Chart, but charted as an "extra tip" on the Ultratip Bubbling Under chart.)	—	—		That's the Spirit
"Blasphemy"	2015	137	—	8	96	—	—	—		That's the Spirit
"Run"	2015	143	—	9	97	—	—	—		That's the Spirit
"Ouch"	2019	—	—	10	—	—	—	—		Amo
"Fresh Bruises"	2019	—	—	17	—	—	—	—		Amo
"I Don't Know What to Say"	2019	—	—	14	—	—	—	—		Amo
"Kingslayer" (featuring Babymetal)	2020	51	—	2	—	—	24	26	BPI: Silver; ARIA: Gold; PMB: Gold; RIAA: Gold	Post Human: Survival Horror
"1x1" (featuring Nova Twins)	2020	55	—	3	—	—	21	30	PMB: Gold	Post Human: Survival Horror
"Dear Diary,"	2020	—	—	4	—	—	34	37		Post Human: Survival Horror
"One Day the Only Butterflies Left Will Be in Your Chest as You March Towards Your Death" (featuring Amy Lee)	2020	—	—	14	—	—	—	—		Post Human: Survival Horror
"Itch for the Cure (When Will We Be Free?)"	2020	—	—	15	—	—	—	—		Post Human: Survival Horror
"Youtopia"	2024	50	—	6	—	—	19	—		Post Human: Nex Gen
"Limousine" (featuring Aurora)	2024	57	—	7	—	—	17	48		Post Human: Nex Gen
"A Bullet w/ My Name On" (featuring Underoath)	2024	—	—	13	—	—	28	—		Post Human: Nex Gen
"N/A"	2024	—	—	10	—	—	—	—		Post Human: Nex Gen
"R.I.P."	2024	—	—	21	—	—	—	—		Post Human: Nex Gen
"Dig It"	2024	—	—	31	—	—	—	—		Post Human: Nex Gen
"(OST) (Spi)ritual"	2024	—	—	27	—	—	—	—		Post Human: Nex Gen
"(OST) P.U.S.S.-E"	2024	—	—	36	—	—	—	— (Note: "(OST) P.U.S.S.-E" did not enter the US Hot Rock & Alternative Songs chart, but peaked at number 40 on the US Hot Dance/Electronic Songs chart.)		Post Human: Nex Gen
"Pray for Plagues"	2026	—	—	—	—	—	24	—		Count Your Blessings | Repented
"Tell Slater Not to Wash His Dick"	2026	—	—	—	—	—	39	—		Count Your Blessings | Repented
"—" denotes a release that did not chart or was not issued in that region.

== Videos ==
=== Video albums ===
List of video albums, with selected chart positions
Title	Album details	Peak chart positions				
Title	Album details	UK	AUT	GER	SWE	SWI
Live at Wembley	Released: 22 June 2015; Labels: RCA, Sony; Formats: BR, DVD	1	6	50	5	3
Live at the Royal Albert Hall	Released: 2 December 2016; Labels: RCA, Sony; Formats: BR, DL, DVD-V	—	—	—	—	—
L.I.V.E. in São Paulo	Released: 10 April 2026; Labels: RCA, Sony; Formats: BR, DL, DVD-V	—	—	—	—	—
"—" denotes a release that did not chart or was not issued in that region.

=== Music videos ===
List of music videos, showing director(s) and year released
Title	Year	Director(s)	Ref.
"Traitors Never Play Hangman"	2007	Unknown	
"Pray for Plagues"	2007	Popcore Film and Kenny Lindström	
"For Stevie Wonder's Eyes Only (Braille)"	2008	Perrone Salvatore	
"The Comedown"	2008	Adam Powell	
"Chelsea Smile"	2009	Adam Powell	
"Diamonds Aren't Forever"	2009	Khaled Lowe	
"The Sadness Will Never End"	2009	Adam Powell	
"It Never Ends"	2010	Plastic Kid	
"Anthem"	2010	Shane Davey	
"Blessed with a Curse"	2011	Toxic	
"Visions"	2011	Plastic Kid	
"Alligator Blood"	2011	Stuart Birchall	
"Crucify Me"	2012	Dave Cleeve	
"Shadow Moses"	2013	Nicholas Abbott	
"Sleepwalking"	2013	A Nice Idea Every Day, Richard Sidwell	
"Go to Hell, for Heaven's Sake"	2013	Stuart Birchall	
"Can You Feel My Heart"	2013	Richard Sidwell and Alistair Legrand	
"Drown"	2014	Plastic Kid	
"Throne"	2015	Oliver Sykes and Plastic Kid	
"True Friends"	2015	Oliver Sykes	
"Follow You"	2016	Oliver Sykes and Frank Borin	
"Avalanche"	2016	Tom Sykes	
"Oh No"	2016	Isaac Eastgate	
"Mantra"	2018	Alex Southam	
"Wonderful Life"	2018	Theo Watkins	
"Medicine"	2019	Oliver Latta	
"Nihilist Blues"	2019	Oliver Sykes and Polygon	
"Mother Tongue"	2019	Chris Muir	
"Sugar Honey Ice & Tea"	2019	Oliver Sykes and Brian Cox	
"In the Dark"	2019	Oliver Sykes and Brian Cox	
"Ludens"	2019	Oliver Sykes	
"Parasite Eve"	2020	Oliver Sykes	
"Obey"	2020	Oliver Sykes	
"Teardrops"	2020	Oliver Sykes	
"Die4U"	2021	Oliver Sykes	
"Strangers"	2022	Thomas James	
"Lost"	2023	Oliver Sykes and Jensen Noen	
"Amen!"	2023	Weston Allen	
"Kool-Aid"	2024	Jensen Noen and Masaki Watanabe	
"Top 10 Statues That Cried Blood"	2024	Harry Lindley	
"Wonderwall"	2025	Oliver Sykes	
"Dehumanized"	2026	Eric Richter and Oliver Sykes	

== Other appearances ==
List of other appearances, showing year released and album name
Title	Year	Album	Ref.
"Don't Look Down" (featuring Orifice Vulgatron)	2014	Radio 1 Rescores: Drive	
"Ludens"	2019	Death Stranding: Timefall	
"Moon Over the Castle"	2022	Find Your Line: Official Music from Gran Turismo 7	
"Strangers" (acoustic)	2023	Earth/Percent x Earth Day 2023 Compilation Album	
"Throne"	2026	Ghost of Yōtei	
