= Roskilde Festival 2019 =

The Roskilde Festival 2019 was held on 29 June to 6 July 2019 in Roskilde, Denmark. The headliners included Bob Dylan, Travis Scott, Robyn, and The Cure.

== Line-up ==
Headline performers are listed in Boldface. Artists listed from latest to earliest set times.

=== Orange Stage ===
| Wednesday | Thursday | Friday | Saturday |
|---|---|---|---|
| **Cardi B**; **Bob Dylan With His Band**; Silvana Imam; Sing-Along | **Travis Scott**; **MØ**; Empire of the Sun; Jorge Ben Jor | **Robyn**; ~~**Chance the Rapper**~~; **Wu-Tang Clan**; **Vampire Weekend**; Bring Me the Horizon | **The Cure**; **Janelle Monáe**; Bikstok Røgsystem |

Orange Stage set lists
Cardi B
1. "Get Up 10"
2. "Press"
3. "Backin' It Up"
4. "Money Bag"
5. "No Limit"
6. "She Bad"
7. "Money"
8. "MotorSport"
9. "Drip"
10. "Please Me"
11. "Girls Like You"
12. "Ring"
13. "Be Careful"
14. "Twerk"
15. "Thotiana"
16. "Taki Taki"
17. "Wish Wish"
18. "Clout"
19. "I Like It"
20. "Finesse"
21. "Bartier Cardi"
22. "Bodak Yellow"
Bob Dylan
1. "Things Have Changed"
2. "It Ain't Me Babe"
3. "Highway 61 Revisited"
4. "Simple Twist of Fate"
5. "Cry a While"
6. "Honest with Me"
7. "Make You Feel My Love"
8. "Pay in Blood"
9. "Like a Rolling Stone"
10. "Early Roman Kings"
11. "Girl from the North Country"
12. "Love Sick"
13. "Thunder on the Mountain"
14. "Soon After Midnight"
15. "Gotta Serve Somebody"

Encore

16. "Blowin' in the Wind"
17. "It Takes a Lot to Laugh, It Takes a Train to Cry"
Travis Scott
1. "Stargazing"
2. "Carousel"
3. "Highest in the Room"
4. "4 AM"
5. "Way Back"
6. "Mamacita"
7. "Butterfly Effect"
8. "No Bystanders"
9. "Upper Echelon"
10. "90210"
11. "Love Galore"
12. "Wake Up"
13. "Skeletons"
14. "AstroThunder"
15. "R.I.P. Screw"
16. "Zeze"
17. "The London"
18. "Pick Up the Phone"
19. "Antidote"
20. "Can't Say"
21. "Goosebumps"
22. "Sicko Mode"
MØ
1. "Purple Like the Summer Rain"
2. "Imaginary Friend"
3. "I Want You"
4. "Kamikaze"
5. "Pilgrim"
6. "Get It Right"
7. "Red Wine"
8. "West Hollywood"
9. "Waste of Time"
10. "Glass"
11. "Nights with You"
12. "Nostalgia"
13. "Say You'll Be There" (Spice Girls cover)
14. "Turn My Heart to Stone"
15. "Beautiful Wreck"
16. "Blur"
17. "Mercy"
18. "Way Down"
19. "Lean On"

Encore

20. "Never Wanna Know"
21. "Don't Leave"
22. "Final Song"
Robyn
1. "Send to Robin Immediately"
2. "Honey"
3. "Indestructible"
4. "Ever Again"
5. "Be Mine!"
6. "Because It's in the Music"
7. "Between the Lines"
8. "Love Is Free"
9. "Don't Fucking Tell Me What to Do"
10. "Dancing On My Own"
11. "Missing U"
12. "Call Your Girlfriend"

Encore

13. "With Every Heartbeat"
14. "Who Do You Love?"
Vampire Weekend
1. "Sunflower"
2. "Unbelievers"
3. "Cape Cod Kwassa Kwassa"
4. "Holiday"
5. "This Life"
6. "Step"
7. "Sympathy"
8. "NEW DORP. NEW YORK" (SBTRKT cover)
9. "How Long?"
10. "Harmony Hall"
11. "Diane Young"
12. "Cousins"
13. "A-Punk"
14. "Ya Hey"
15. "Jerusalem, New York, Berlin"
Bring Me the Horizon
1. "Mantra"
2. "The House of Wolves"
3. "Medicine"
4. "Wonderful Life"
5. "Shadow Moses"
6. "Happy Song"
7. "Mother Tongue"
8. "Can You Feel My Heart"
9. "Nihilist Blues"
10. "Antivist"
11. "Follow You"
12. "Drown"
13. "Throne"
The Cure
1. "Shake Dog Shake"
2. "From the Edge of the Deep Green Sea"
3. "Just One Kiss"
4. "Lovesong"
5. "Last Dance"
6. "Pictures of You"
7. "High"
8. "A Night Like This"
9. "Burn"
10. "Fascination Street"
11. "Never Enough"
12. "Push"
13. "In Between Days"
14. "Just Like Heaven"
15. "Play for Today"
16. "A Forest"
17. "Primary"
18. "Want"
19. "39"
20. "One Hundred Years"

Encore

21. "Lullaby"
22. "The Caterpillar"
23. "The Walk"
24. "Friday I'm in Love"
25. "Close to Me"
26. "Why Can't I Be You?"
27. "Boys Don't Cry"
Bikstok Røgsystem
1. "Tyveknægt"
2. "Græder for dem"
3. "Kugledans"
4. "Unger"
5. "Delirium"
6. "DK's koner"
7. "Firseren"
8. "Gongolagoz"
9. "Radio"

Encore

10. "Cigar"

=== Arena ===
| Wednesday | Thursday | Friday | Saturday |
|---|---|---|---|
| Christine and the Queens; Skepta; Tears for Fears | Spleen United; Brockhampton; **Robert Plant and the Sensational Space Shifters**; Bombino; Testament; Søren Huss | Death Grips; **Underworld**; Johnny Marr; ~~Hugo Helmig~~; Hans Philip; Jungle; Inna de Yard | Cypress Hill; Behemoth; Jorja Smith; Noel Gallagher's High Flying Birds; Scarlet Pleasure; Catfish and the Bottlemen |

=== Avalon ===
| Wednesday | Thursday | Friday | Saturday |
|---|---|---|---|
| Power Trip; Rosalía; Santrofi; Maggie Rogers | Shame; Jon Hopkins; Fatoumata Diawara; Neneh Cherry; Parquet Courts; Sharon Van Etten; Barselona | Bantou Mentale; Lydmor; The Garifuna Collective; Julia Holter; Spiritualized; Aldous Harding; Jada | Gaye Su Akyol; Marina; Converge; Philip H. Anselmo & The Illegals; Zeitkratzer; Džambo Aguševi Orchestra; Khruangbin |

=== Apollo ===
| Wednesday | Thursday | Friday | Saturday |
|---|---|---|---|
| Hatari; Sheck Wes; JPEGMafia; Farveblind | Blawan; Amnesia Scanner; Giorgia Angiuli; Denzel Curry; Lemaitre; Joey Purp; Aurora; Artigeardit | Octavian; Sophie; Throwing Snow; Nicola Cruz; Saweetie; Ross from Friends; Sushi x Kobe; Cupcakke | DJ Koze; The Comet Is Coming; Alma; Lizzo; FLOHIO; Fouli; ÌFÉ; Koffee and the Raggamuffins Band |

=== Pavilion ===
| Wednesday | Thursday | Friday | Saturday |
|---|---|---|---|
| Carpenter Brut; Fontaines D.C.; Rolling Blackouts Coastal Fever; Ulver | Full of Hell & The Body; Speaker Bite Me; La Dispute; The Maurice Louca Elephantine Band; Julien Baker; ~~Lucy Dacus~~; Penelope Isles; Nanook; Vinicio Capossela | Baest; Sons of Kemet XL; Misery Index; Black Midi; Weyes Blood; Lankum; Lowly; Descartes a Kant | Kikagaku Moyo; Petrol Girls; Girlpool; Sofiane Saidi & Mazalda; Whores.; The Armed; Saz'iso |

=== Gloria ===
| Wednesday | Thursday | Friday | Saturday |
|---|---|---|---|
| Pardans; Ghetto Kumbé; Baby in Vain x Corpus | Amyl and the Sniffers; Asmâa Hamzaoui & Bnat Timbouktou; Crack Cloud; Tirzah; Cult Leader; Konstrukt; Sibusile Xaba; Stella Donnelly; Sing-Along | 700 Bliss; Heave Blood & Die; Rival Consoles; Yves Tumor; Astrid Sonne; Karkhana; Dawda Jobarteh feat. CTM; Sidney Gish; Sing-Along | K-X-P; La Payara; Tássia Reis; Croatian Amor; Clan Caiman; Liraz; Nakhane; Madame Gandhi; Sing-Along |
