= In the Dark (Bring Me the Horizon song) =

Single by Bring Me the Horizon

from the album Amo
- Released: 21 October 2019
- Genre: Pop rock; electronic rock; electropop
- Length: 4:31
- Label: Sony; RCA
- Songwriter(s): Jordan Fish; Matt Kean; Oliver Sykes; Matt Nicholls; Lee Malia
- Producer(s): Oliver Sykes; Jordan Fish

Bring Me the Horizon singles chronology
"Sugar Honey Ice & Tea" (2019)	"In the Dark" (2019)	"Ludens" (2019)

Music video
- "In the Dark" on YouTube

"In the Dark" is a song by British rock band Bring Me the Horizon. Produced by the band's vocalist Oliver Sykes and keyboardist Jordan Fish, it is featured on the group's 2019 sixth studio album Amo. The track was released as the seventh and final single from the album on 21 October 2019.

== Composition ==
"In the Dark" has been described by critics as pop rock, electronic rock, and electropop. It was written by the band's lead vocalist Oliver Sykes, guitarist Lee Malia, bassist Matt Kean, drummer Matt Nicholls and keyboardist Jordan Fish. It was produced by Sykes and Fish. Speaking about the song to Kerrang!, Fish stated what the song was about:

"This is one of the more poppy ones. Or at least it’s not very heavy, or got rock guitars. It's from the perspective of someone who's found out their lover's been cheating. It's musically very different for us. We're so proud of it. We wanted to make sure it was positioned quite early in the record so it wouldn't get lost. And while it's poppy, it's still quite dark. We don't worry about what people might think of that. It's not a healthy mind-set to be in when you're trying to write music. We try not to let what people might expect from us affect us creatively, but at the same time we do still like heavy music. So it's a consideration. No-one wants to completely alienate their existing fans. I'm sure it'll take people a minute to get it, but I have so much confidence in the album in general that I know they'll come around."

== Promotion and release ==
On 18 October 2019, the band revealed a teaser on their social media accounts for a video that used music from "In the Dark" with the caption "r u ready?" This caused fans to believe that the band was about to release a music video for the single, which was announced to be released on 21 October 2019.

== Music video ==
The video for "In the Dark" was released on 21 October 2019 and was directed by frontman Oliver Sykes and Brian Cox.

The music video stars and revolves around American actor Forest Whitaker. Whitaker's daughter was a fan of the band and he and his daughter attended a gig together in 2017, the band met Whitaker and his daughter backstage after the concert. They kept in contact and wanted to do something together. It was revealed that Whitaker was initially pinned to play the protagonist in "Mantra" but had to pull out due to scheduling conflicts. Sykes revealed that Whitaker contacted him when they were about to shoot the video for "In the Dark" and everything then fell into place.

Speaking about the concept of the video and his thoughts around it, Sykes told NME:

"I guess it's meant to be a representation of the grieving process. It's a visual metaphor for what the song is talking about. When it comes to the grieving process, we all try to ignore that feeling – but it's important to grieve. Even if something's happened for the best, you need to take that moment to feel something. Some people lose a whole world to grief sometimes, while others just don't grieve. Sometimes we're just too scared to face our emotions."

== Charts ==
Chart performance for "In the Dark"
Chart (2019)	Peak position
New Zealand Hot Singles (RMNZ)	34
UK Rock & Metal (OCC)	15
US Hot Rock & Alternative Songs (Billboard)	48

== Certifications ==
Certifications for "In the Dark"
Region	Certification	Certified units/sales
Brazil (Pro-Música Brasil)	Gold	20,000^{‡}
^{‡} Sales+streaming figures based on certification alone.
