= Chelsea Smile (song) =

2009 single by Bring Me the Horizon

Promotional single by Bring Me the Horizon

from the album Suicide Season
- Released: January 2009
- Genre: Metalcore
- Length: 5:02 (album version); 4:12 (video version)
- Label: Visible Noise; Epitaph
- Composers: Oli Sykes; Lee Malia; Curtis Ward; Matt Kean; Matt Nicholls
- Lyricist: Oli Sykes
- Producers: Fredrik Nordström; Henrik Udd

Bring Me the Horizon singles chronology
"For Stevie Wonder's Eyes Only (Braille)" (2008)	"Chelsea Smile" (2009)	"Diamonds Aren't Forever" (2009)

Music video
- "Chelsea Smile" on YouTube

"Chelsea Smile" is a song by British rock band Bring Me the Horizon. Produced by Fredrik Nordström and Henrik Udd, it was featured on the band's 2008 second studio album Suicide Season. The song was also released as the second music video from the album in January 2009. Travie McCoy and KC Blitz produced remixes of the track for the album's special edition reissue, Suicide Season Cut Up!, which was released in 2009.

== Background ==
"Chelsea Smile" has been identified as evidence of Bring Me the Horizon's musical development on Suicide Season; Exclaim! writer Dave Synyard praised it, alongside "It Was Written in Blood", for featuring "catchier rhythms, lessened guttural vocals and more structured songwriting, as opposed to reverting to a technical onslaught of guitar riffs". When asked about this change in approach in relation to the two songs, vocalist Oliver Sykes explained that "I think it's good when a band can be really heavy and still have catchy hooks and riffs without it being cheesy and typical", adding that the band were "trying to make the heaviest and catchiest music possible".

For the Cut Up! portion of the 2009 special edition reissue of Suicide Season, remixes of "Chelsea Smile" were produced by Jamie Kossoff and Jon Courtney under their KC Blitz moniker, as well as Gym Class Heroes frontman Travie McCoy. According to set list aggregation website setlist.fm, "Chelsea Smile" is the song performed most frequently at Bring Me the Horizon concerts. It has been included in the set lists of several high-profile shows, including the band's performances at Wembley Arena in 2014 (documented on the live video album Live at Wembley), Reading and Leeds Festivals in 2015 and Alexandra Palace as part of the That's the Spirit Tour in 2015.

== Music video ==
The music video for "Chelsea Smile" was directed by Adam Powell, who also worked on the video for earlier Suicide Season track "The Comedown". It was filmed and released in early January 2009, alongside a series of four behind the scenes videos which were uploaded periodically to the band's Myspace page. The video features a brief appearance from the members of Canadian hardcore punk band Cancer Bats, who are shown playing poker during the opening scene. Kerrang! included it at number 9 on their list of the band's best music videos in April 2015, praising its high-energy party vibe. The video was later included on the Cut Up! special edition reissue of Suicide Season.

== Critical reception ==
AllMusic's Tom Forget praised "Chelsea Smile" as a highlight of Suicide Season, describing it as "Intricately constructed and refreshingly unpredictable". Dan Slessor of the Alternative Press named it the best Bring Me the Horizon song, praising its "armor-plated juddering, deranged energy, titanic breakdown and insidiously catchy hooks". Loudwire's Sarai C. ranked it at number two on her feature of the band's best songs, highlighting its importance to the development of the group's sound and the metalcore genre in general, moving away from its deathcore roots. Metal Hammer writer Luke Morton ranked it the sixth best song by the band, describing it as "one of the nastiest songs to ever be called catchy" and praising its "brutalising breakdowns" and "primal screams". In 2019, Billboard ranked the song number seven on their list of the 10 greatest Bring Me the Horizon songs, and in 2022, Kerrang! ranked the song number four on their list of the 20 greatest Bring Me the Horizon songs. In 2024, Ultimate Guitar said it was "one of the most instantly recognizable tunes of metalcore's MySpace era."

== Personnel ==
Credits adapted from Tidal.

Bring Me the Horizon

- Oliver Sykes – lead vocals, keyboards, programming
- Lee Malia – lead guitar
- Curtis Ward – rhythm guitar
- Matt Kean – bass
- Matt Nicholls – drums

Additional personnel

- Fredrik Nordström – production, mixing
- Henrik Udd – production, mixing
- Peter In De Betou – mastering
