= Sugar Honey Ice & Tea =

Single by Bring Me the Horizon

from the album Amo
- Released: 26 July 2019
- Genre: Pop metal
- Length: 4:22
- Label: Sony; RCA
- Songwriter(s): Jordan Fish; Matt Kean; Oliver Sykes; Matt Nicholls; Lee Malia
- Producer(s): Oliver Sykes; Jordan Fish

Bring Me the Horizon singles chronology
"Nihilist Blues" (2019)	"Sugar Honey Ice & Tea" (2019)	"In the Dark" (2019)

Music video
- "Sugar Honey Ice & Tea" on YouTube

"Sugar Honey Ice & Tea" is a song by British rock band Bring Me the Horizon. Produced by the band's vocalist Oliver Sykes and keyboardist Jordan Fish, it is featured on the group's 2019 sixth studio album Amo. The track was released as the sixth single from the album on 26 July 2019.

== Composition ==
"Sugar Honey Ice & Tea" has been described as a pop metal song.

== Promotion and release ==
The track was shared by the band through cryptic clips on their social media accounts. These cryptic clips showed someone applying makeup on themselves in a weird manner with the caption reading "tomorrow". This would immediately stir up interest which had the band release the official video for "Sugar Honey Ice & Tea" the following day, alongside the scheduled single on 26 July 2019.

== Music video ==
The official video for the song was released alongside the single on 26 July 2019. It was directed by frontman and primary songwriter, Oliver Sykes, and Brian Cox. The video would feature various different live performances of the band performing the song live, as well as other unsettling trippy imagery and animation to intertwine with the song alongside Sykes performing the song on guitar in a green screen area.

== Charts ==
Chart performance for "Sugar Honey Ice & Tea"
Chart (2019)	Peak position
New Zealand Hot Singles (RMNZ)	36
UK Rock & Metal (OCC)	14
US Hot Rock & Alternative Songs (Billboard)	47

== Certifications ==
Certifications for "Sugar Honey Ice & Tea"
Region	Certification	Certified units/sales
Brazil (Pro-Música Brasil)	Gold	20,000^{‡}
^{‡} Sales+streaming figures based on certification alone.
