= Kerrang! Awards 2019 =

British music awards ceremony

Kerrang! - The Awards 2019
- Sponsored by: Marshall Amplification; Rizla; Vans
- Date: 19 July 2019
- Venue: Islington Assembly Hall
- Country: United Kingdom
- Presented by: Kerrang!

Highlights
- Most wins: Metallica (2)
- Most nominations: Architects (3)
- Website: kerrang.com/vote

The 2019 edition of the Kerrang! Awards, a ceremony recognising achievements in rock music over the preceding twelve months, took place on June 19, 2019. As has long been the case for the Kerrang! Awards, the winners for the major categories were determined by fan votes from a shortlist of nominees, itself determined by a period of open fan nominee submissions.

Architects received the most nominations with three, namely 'Best Album', 'Best British Act', and 'Best British Live Act'. The band would ultimately walk away with only the latter award, winning it for the second consecutive year.

The event was also notable for the 'Hall of Fame' award being awarded for the first time since 2014, with Skunk Anansie winning the distinction. Feeder's frontman Grant Nicholas, who presented the band with their award, would two months later see his own band inducted into Kerrang! Radio's Hall of Fame.

The ceremony was not broadcast live but was streamed online the following evening before being uploaded to the Kerrang! YouTube channel.

== Winners and Nominees ==
Best Album (presented by Kelly Osbourne)	Best Song (presented by Employed to Serve)
Ghost – Prequelle; Behemoth – I Loved You at Your Darkest; Bring Me the Horizon – Amo; Architects – Holy Hell; Greta Van Fleet – Anthem of the Peaceful Army	Fever 333 – Burn It; Bring Me the Horizon – Mantra; Rammstein – Deutschland; Frank Iero – Young and Doomed; Slipknot – All Out Life
Best British Breakthrough	Best International Breakthrough (presented by Matt Berry)
Idles; Yonaka; Scarlxrd; Black Peaks; Svalbard	SWMRS; Angel Du$t; The Interrupters; Simple Creatures; Vein
Best British Act	Best International Act (presented by Roger Taylor)
Bring Me the Horizon; Architects; Biffy Clyro; Enter Shikari; Iron Maiden	Metallica; Foo Fighters; Panic! at the Disco; Rammstein; Slipknot
Best British Live Act (presented by Caleb Shomo)	Best International Live Act
Architects; Don Broco; Employed to Serve; Enter Shikari; Frank Carter & the Rattlesnakes	Metallica; Fever 333; Ghost; Mastodon; Parkway Drive
Special Achievement awards
Kerrang! Hall of Fame: Skunk Anansie (presented by Grant Nicholas); Kerrang! Icon: Motörhead; Kerrang! Inspiration: Jimmy Page (presented by Royal Blood)

== Multiple nominations and awards ==
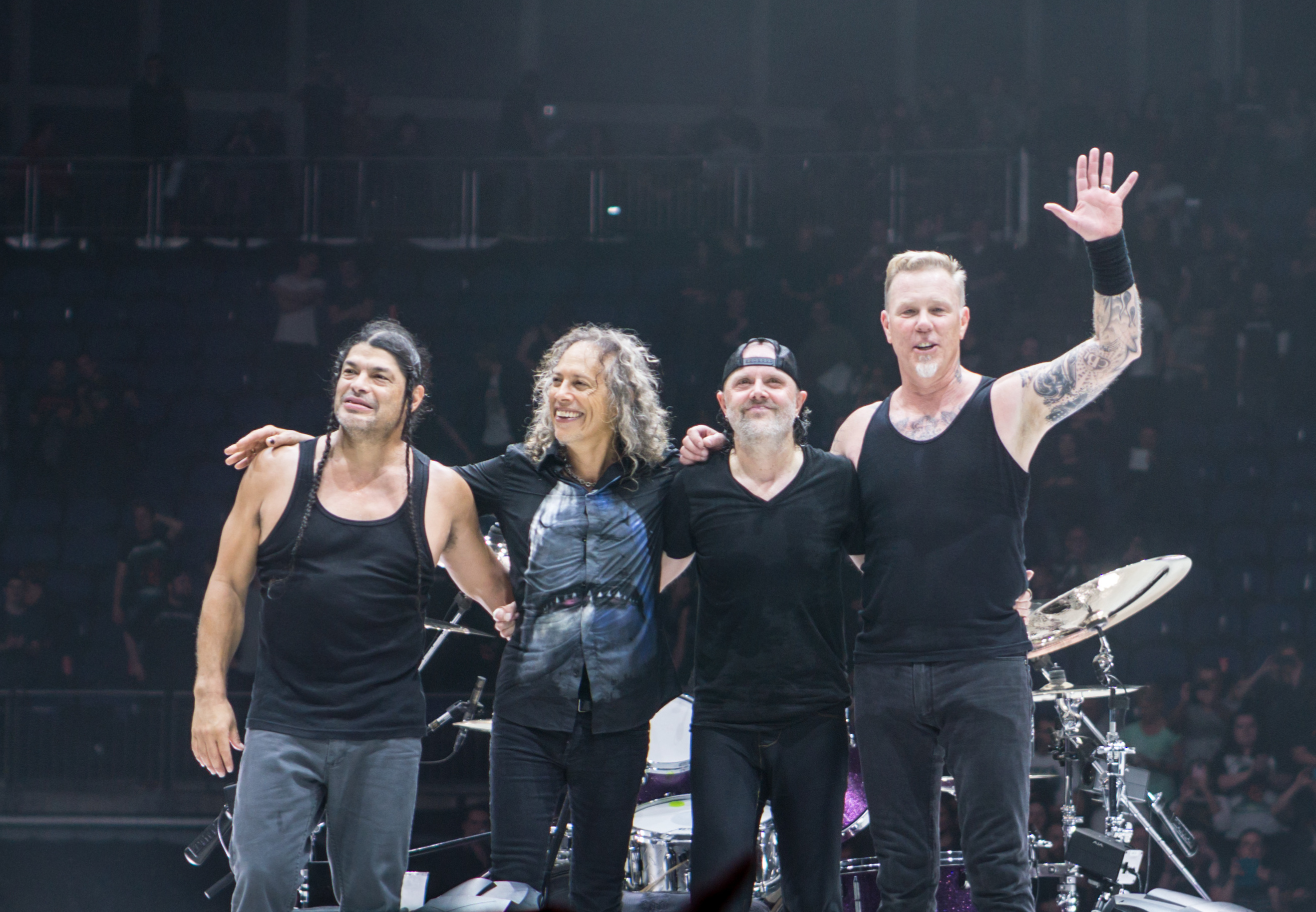
Metallica (pictured in London, 2017) won the most awards of the night

The following artists received multiple nominations:

Three:

- Architects

Two:

- Bring Me the Horizon
- Enter Shikari
- Ghost
- Metallica
- Slipknot
- Rammstein

The following artists received multiple awards:

Two:

- Metallica
