= Amo (Bring Me the Horizon album) =

- Physical cover

Studio album by Bring Me the Horizon
- Released: 25 January 2019
- Studio: Sphere and MDDN Studios; Los Angeles, US; The Cinnamons; Sheffield, South Yorkshire
- Genre: Pop rock; electronic rock; electropop; alternative rock; hard rock
- Length: 51:54
- Label: Sony; RCA
- Producer: Oli Sykes; Jordan Fish

Bring Me the Horizon chronology
Live at the Royal Albert Hall (2016)	Amo (2019)	Music to Listen To... (2019)

Singles from Amo
- 1. "Mantra" Released: 21 August 2018; 2. "Wonderful Life" Released: 21 October 2018; 3. "Medicine" Released: 3 January 2019; 4. "Mother Tongue" Released: 22 January 2019; 5. "Nihilist Blues" Released: 24 January 2019; 6. "Sugar Honey Ice & Tea" Released: 26 July 2019; 7. "In the Dark" Released: 21 October 2019

Digital cover
- Artwork used for digital streaming services

Amo (stylised in lowercase) is the sixth studio album by British rock band Bring Me the Horizon. Originally scheduled for release on 11 January 2019, it was released on 25 January 2019. The album was announced on 22 August 2018, a day after the release of the lead single "Mantra". It was produced by vocalist Oli Sykes and keyboardist Jordan Fish, and was written and recorded primarily in Los Angeles.

The album was preceded by five singles. The lead single, "Mantra", was released on 21 August 2018. The second single, "Wonderful Life" featuring Dani Filth of Cradle of Filth, was released on 21 October 2018. The third single, "Medicine", was released on 3 January 2019. The fourth single, "Mother Tongue", was released on 22 January 2019. The fifth single, "Nihilist Blues" featuring Grimes, was released on 24 January 2019. "Sugar Honey Ice & Tea" was released as the album's sixth single on 26 July 2019. "In the Dark" was released as the album's seventh single on 21 October 2019.

The band embarked on the First Love World Tour in 2019 in support of the album. In the 22 August 2018 issue of Kerrang!, they described the album as "varied", "free", "weird" and "mental", with NME noting that "Mantra" continues the electronic and pop rock elements featured on the band's previous studio album, That's the Spirit (2015). "Mantra" subsequently debuted at number one on the UK Rock & Metal Chart, and its video was released on 24 August. Upon its release, the album was met with critical acclaim and was later nominated for a Kerrang! Award for Best Album as well as the Grammy Award for Best Rock Album.

== Background and promotion ==
The album, named after the Portuguese word for "I love", (Note: Sykes stated in an NME interview: "Obviously 'Amo' is Portuguese for 'I love', obviously there's the 'ammunition' part and then in European Portuguese it means 'master'. It sounds happy, but there are all these hidden meanings that make it more complex.") was first promoted by an advertising campaign of billboards across London and other cities worldwide with symbols used by the band in the past on them, along with the words "Do you wanna start a cult with me?", which are lyrics from "Mantra". A website titled joinmantra.org was also launched that stated "Salvation will return", and a phone number that when called featured various audio clips at different times, including one of a woman named Samantha stating "They're making me do this. I didn't know what I was getting myself into."

The song "Mantra" was subsequently premiered on BBC Radio 1, with Sykes saying to Annie Mac: "It's basically—we've gone off and recorded some stuff and this is the first thing we've wanted to show people of our return. It's quite different but it's got similarities—it's what we wanted to share with the world." Sykes stated that "Mantra" is "not really" representative of the sound of the whole album, also saying "every song on the record is completely different. It’s a lot more experimental than our last record."

On 21 October, the band released their second single "Wonderful Life" featuring Dani Filth, along with the tracklist for Amo. That same day, the band announced that the album release date has been delayed to 25 January 2019.

On 3 January 2019, the band released the third single "Medicine" and its corresponding music video. On 22 January, the band released their fourth single "Mother Tongue". On 24 January, the band released their fifth single "Nihilist Blues" featuring Grimes. On 26 July, the band released the sixth single "Sugar Honey Ice & Tea" alongside an accompanying music video. On 21 October, the band released the seventh single "In the Dark" alongside an accompanying music video featuring Forest Whitaker.

== Composition ==
=== Influences, style and themes ===
Sykes stated about the album: "amo is a love album that explores every aspect of that most powerful emotion. [...] It deals with the good the bad and the ugly, and as a result we've created an album that's more experimental, more varied, weird, and wonderful than anything we've done before." He later commented that Amo is a concept album about love, as "Everything boils down to love in the end". Sykes also said that some of the lyrical content concerns his divorce. The genres of the album has been described as pop rock, electronic rock, electropop, synth-pop, EDM, alternative rock, electronica, hard rock, pop metal, and pop. The album also contains elements of hip hop and trap.

== Reception ==
=== Critical reception ===
Professional ratings
Aggregate scores
Source	Rating
AnyDecentMusic?	6.9/10
Metacritic	85/100
Review scores
Source	Rating
AllMusic	3.5/5 stars
Consequence of Sound	B
Exclaim!	7/10
The Independent	4/5 stars
The Guardian	3/5 stars
Kerrang!	5/5
Metal Injection	7.5/10
NME	5/5 stars
Substream Magazine	3.5/5 stars
Wall of Sound	7.5/10

Amo received critical acclaim from music critics. At Metacritic, which assigns a normalised rating out of 100 to reviews from mainstream critics, the album has an average score of 85 out of 100 based on 12 reviews, indicating "universal acclaim". AllMusic gave the album a positive review saying, "Amo is a genre-bending thrill ride that marks a brave new era for the band." The Independent called the album "catchy and eclectic" but also said that "amo won't satisfy all of BMTH's fans...[but will] bring in some new ones." NME praised the album calling the interludes "dark and mechanical" and "exciting signposts to the future". In a positive review, Substream Magazine saying, "The way that Bring Me The Horizon weaves through genres and dives into them further is challenging."

Wall of Sound rated the album 7.5/10 and said: "Remember how frontman Oli Sykes trolled fans into thinking the band were going to be included on Justin Bieber's 2016 Purpose Tour through the UK? Well, it's kind of like he/they have taken that joke seriously and gone down the path to see what happens, but realistically, they've been progressing towards something like this since the Sempiternal album cycle finished." Dave Simpson at The Guardian compared it to Linkin Park's A Thousand Suns, stating "the likes of 'Medicine', 'Mother Tongue' and 'In the Dark' are anodyne pop that is liable to alienate the band's fanbase and makes an uneasy fit with their desire to experiment. Other tracks lose their way in processed vocals and unfamiliar styles". Lukas Wojcicki of Exclaim! scored the album 7/10 stating: "conversely, the songs that dive head first into electronics, fully embracing this new territory, are some of the album's best and most memorable."

In a positive review, Consequence of Sound wrote, "In U2 terms, That's the Spirit was BMTH's Achtung Baby, where they introduced a new sound, and amo is their Zooropa, where they've taken that sonic evolution one step further." Kerrang! praised the album saying, "Amo's ability to be so many things to so many people is what truly impresses throughout." Metal Injection gave the album a positive review, saying, "if you're open to electronic music and pop as well as rock and metal, you'll most likely enjoy amo."

=== Accolades ===
Publication	Accolade	Rank	Ref.
Alternative Press	Alternative Press's 50 best albums of 2019	—	
Gaffa	Gaffa's best albums of 2019	10	
Gigwise	Gigwise's 51 best albums of 2019	32	
Kerrang!	Kerrang!'s 50 best albums of 2019	3	
Loudwire	The 50 Best Rock Albums of 2019	—	
Loudwire	The Best Hard Rock Album of Each Year Since 1970	1	
Metal Hammer	Metal Hammer's 50 best albums of 2019	44	
NME	The 50 best albums of 2019	11	
NME	NME's best albums of 2010s	99	

== Track listing ==
All tracks are written by Oli Sykes, Lee Malia, Jordan Fish, Matt Kean, and Matt Nicholls, except where noted.

Amo track listing
No.	Title	Writer(s)	Length
1.	"I Apologise If You Feel Something"		2:19
2.	"Mantra"		3:53
3.	"Nihilist Blues" (featuring Grimes)	Amy Lee; Terry Balsamo; Tim McCord; William Hunt	5:25
4.	"In the Dark"		4:31
5.	"Wonderful Life" (featuring Dani Filth)		4:34
6.	"Ouch"		1:49
7.	"Medicine"		3:47
8.	"Sugar Honey Ice & Tea"		4:21
9.	"Why You Gotta Kick Me When I'm Down?"		4:28
10.	"Fresh Bruises"		3:18
11.	"Mother Tongue"		3:37
12.	"Heavy Metal" (featuring Rahzel)		4:00
13.	"I Don't Know What to Say"		5:52
Total length:			51:54

Japanese tour edition bonus tracks
No.	Title	Length
14.	"Throne" (originally appears on That's the Spirit)	3:11
15.	"Happy Song" (originally appears on That's the Spirit)	3:59
16.	"Drown" (originally appears on That's the Spirit)	3:42
17.	"Avalanche" (originally appears on That's the Spirit)	4:22
18.	"Shadow Moses" (originally appears on Sempiternal)	4:03
19.	"Sleepwalking" (originally appears on Sempiternal)	3:50
20.	"Can You Feel My Heart" (originally appears on Sempiternal)	3:47
Total length:		77:28

Notes

- All track titles are stylised in lowercase except for "Mantra", which is stylised in all caps.
- Track 6 is mislabeled as "Ounch" on vinyl releases.

== Personnel ==
Credits taken from Amo liner notes.

Bring Me the Horizon

- Oli Sykes – vocals, production
- Lee Malia – guitars
- Jordan Fish – programming, backing vocals, production, engineering
- Matt Kean – bass
- Matt Nicholls – drums

Additional musicians

- Grimes – guest vocals on track 3
- Alissic – guest vocals on track 4
- Dani Filth – guest vocals on track 5
- Rahzel – guest vocals and beatboxing on track 12
- Choir Noir – additional vocals
- Parallax Orchestra – orchestra

Additional personnel

- Romesh Dodangoda – engineering
- Dan Lancaster – mixing
- Ted Jensen – mastering
- Alejandro Baima, Francesco Cameli, Nick Mills and Daniel Morris – engineering assistance
- Rhys May – mixing engineering
- Matt Ash and Craig Jennings – art
- Darren Oorloff – design
- Pretty Puke – photography

== Charts ==
=== Weekly charts ===
Weekly chart performance for Amo
Chart (2019)	Peak position
Australian Albums (ARIA)	1
Austrian Albums (Ö3 Austria)	5
Belgian Albums (Ultratop Flanders)	2
Belgian Albums (Ultratop Wallonia)	22
Canadian Albums (Billboard)	12
Czech Albums (ČNS IFPI)	6
Dutch Albums (Album Top 100)	12
Finnish Albums (Suomen virallinen lista)	7
French Albums (SNEP)	49
German Albums (Offizielle Top 100)	3
Hungarian Albums (MAHASZ)	26
Irish Albums (IRMA)	15
Italian Albums (FIMI)	20
Japanese Albums (Oricon)	28
Lithuanian Albums (AGATA)	29
New Zealand Albums (RMNZ)	9
Norwegian Albums (VG-lista)	19
Polish Albums (ZPAV)	17
Portuguese Albums (AFP)	8
Scottish Albums (OCC)	1
Spanish Albums (Promusicae)	19
Swedish Albums (Sverigetopplistan)	16
Swiss Albums (Schweizer Hitparade)	6
UK Albums (OCC)	1
UK Rock & Metal Albums (OCC)	1
US Billboard 200	14
US Top Alternative Albums (Billboard)	2
US Top Hard Rock Albums (Billboard)	2
US Top Rock Albums (Billboard)	3

=== Year-end charts ===
Year-end chart performance for Amo
Chart (2019)	Position
Australian Albums (ARIA)	75
Belgian Albums (Ultratop Flanders)	147
UK Albums (OCC)	79
US Top Rock Albums (Billboard)	99
US Top Hard Rock Albums (Billboard)	41

== Certifications ==
Certifications for Amo
Region	Certification	Certified units/sales
Poland (ZPAV)	Gold	10,000^{‡}
Russia (NFPF)	Gold	5,000^{*}
United Kingdom (BPI)	Gold	100,000^{‡}
^{*} Sales figures based on certification alone.^{‡} Sales+streaming figures based on certification alone.
