= Islington Assembly Hall =

London concert hall

Coordinates: 51°32′30″N 0°06′09″W

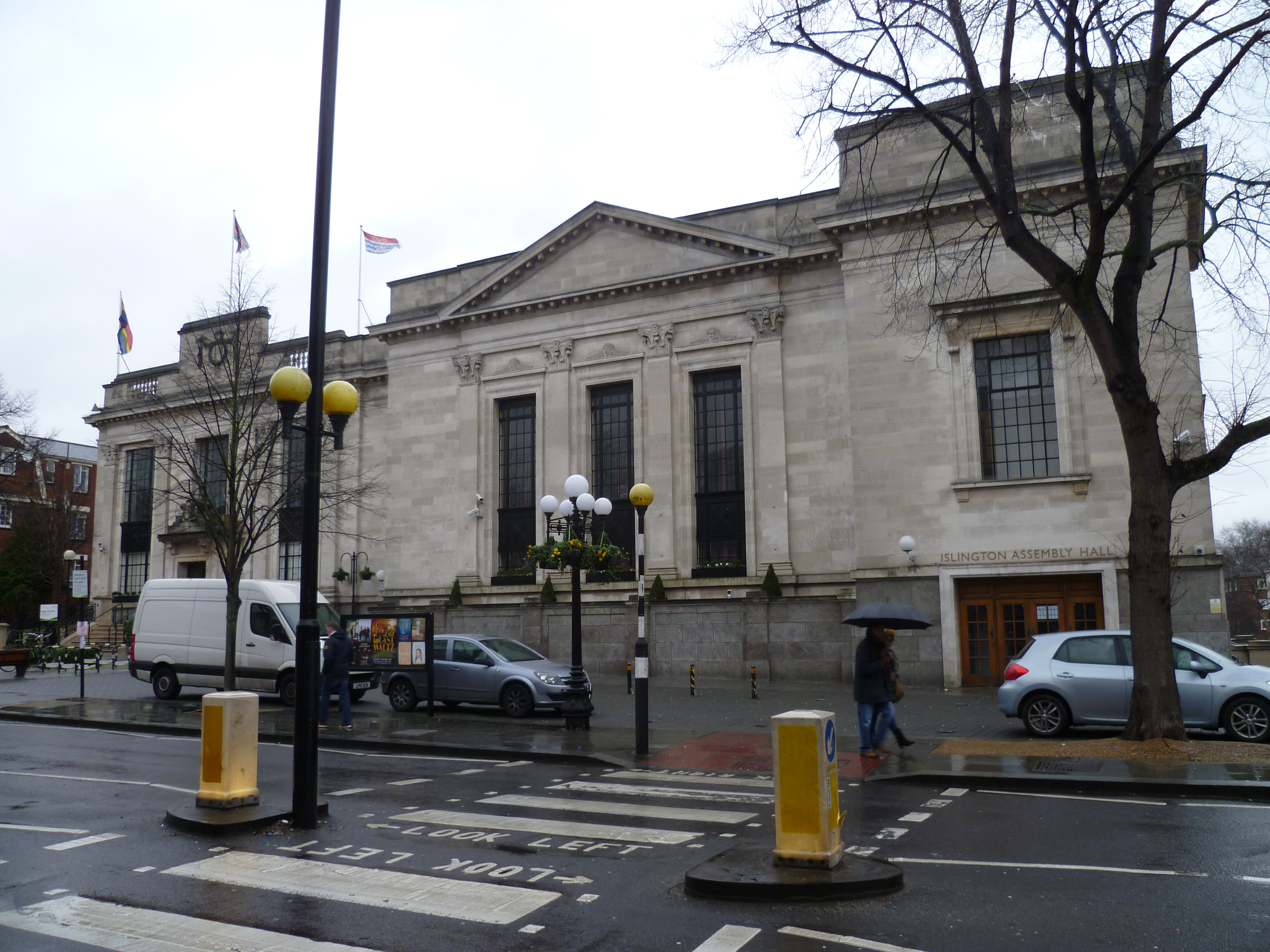
- Interactive map of Islington Assembly Hall
- Address: Upper Street, Islington, London
- Capacity: 890
- Type: Music venue

Website
- islingtonassemblyhall.co.uk

Islington Assembly Hall is a live music venue and events space on Upper Street, Islington, London. It forms part of the Islington Town Hall complex. It has a capacity of 890 for live events, including seating for 200 in its balcony. Events other than music shows, such as public meetings, also take place there.

== History ==
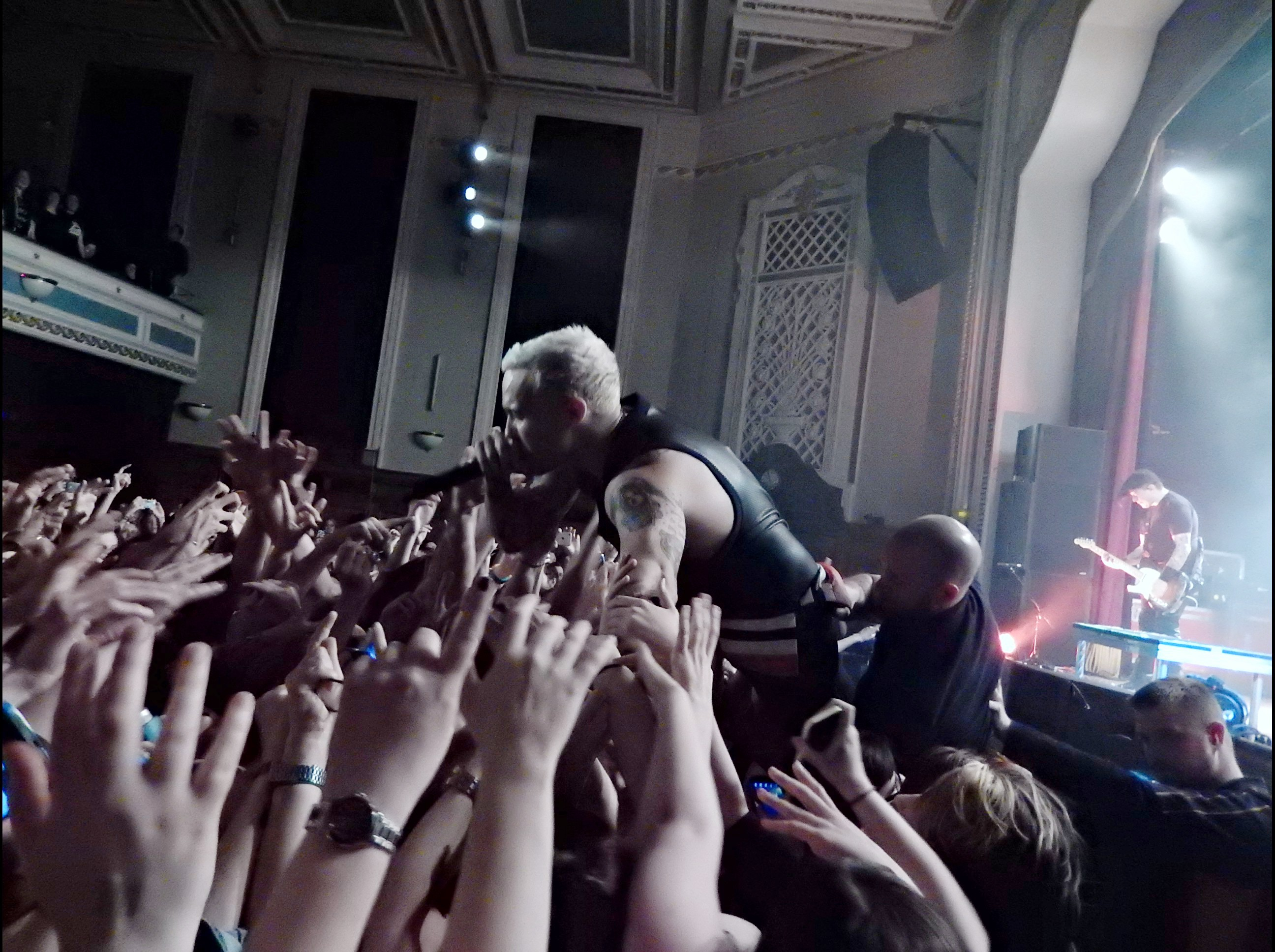
Fall Out Boy at Islington Assembly Hall in 2015

The assembly hall, which was designed with many art deco features, including clocks, paintings and decorative panels, opened in March 1930.

Owned and managed by the local authority, the building hosted events such as variety shows, tea dances and weddings. Performers in the post-war era included the singers Diana Dors, George Formby and Chris Farlowe.

It closed in the mid-1980s and was then used as storage space for around 30 years until Islington Council funded its refurbishment, and it reopened in 2010, almost 80 years to the day since it first opened.

The venue hosted the 2019 Kerrang! Awards, a ceremony celebrating achievements in rock music.
