= Medicine (Bring Me the Horizon song) =

2019 single by Bring Me the Horizon

Single by Bring Me the Horizon

from the album Amo
- Released: 3 January 2019
- Genre: Pop; pop rock; electropop; alternative rock; pop metal
- Length: 3:47
- Label: Sony; RCA
- Songwriter(s): Jordan Fish; Matt Kean; Oliver Sykes; Matt Nicholls; Lee Malia
- Producer(s): Oliver Sykes; Jordan Fish

Bring Me the Horizon singles chronology
"Wonderful Life" (2018)	"Medicine" (2019)	"Mother Tongue" (2019)

Music video
- "Medicine" on YouTube

"Medicine" is a song by British rock band Bring Me the Horizon. Produced by the band's vocalist Oliver Sykes and keyboardist Jordan Fish, it is featured on the group's 2019 sixth studio album Amo. The track was released as the third single from the album on 3 January 2019.

== Composition and lyrics ==
"Medicine" has been described as a pop, pop rock, electropop, alternative rock, and pop metal song. It has aggressive and directly angry lyrics, contrasting with romantic love songs like "Mother Tongue". The song centres around Oliver Sykes' last relationship with Hannah Snowdon. Their marriage ended in a messy divorce in early 2016. While Sykes has explained that the song "Ouch" also talks about that situation, keyboardist Jordan Fish revealed that "Medicine" is "connected to that too." Fish said of the song's lyrics:

"It's about people who are negative influences and how when they leave your life things get much better. It's a mixture of the electronic and radio-friendly elements of our band, but it's still got characteristics of some of the bigger songs we've done before. You'd need to ask Oli who exactly that's about, but I can think of a few people it might be about."

== Music video ==
The music video for "Medicine" was released on the same day as the single was streamed. It is an effects-laden clip, courtesy of animator Extraweg and art director Oliver Latta. According to music website Consequence of Sound, the video shows "a statue-like bust of singer Oli Sykes' head as it is engorged by a plague of demon-like representations of himself". AltPress described it as "freaky, CGI".

== Personnel ==
Credits adapted from Tidal.

Bring Me the Horizon

- Oliver Sykes – lead vocals, production, composition
- Lee Malia – guitars, composition
- Matt Kean – bass, composition
- Matt Nicholls – drums, composition
- Jordan Fish – keyboards, synthesizers, programming, percussion, backing vocals, production, composition

Additional musicians

- Choir Noir – choir

Additional personnel

- Romesh Dodangoda – engineering
- Francesco Cameli – assistant engineering
- Alejandro Baima – assistant engineering
- Daniel Morris – assistant engineering
- Ted Jensen – mastering
- Rhys May – mixing
- Dan Lancaster – mixing

== Charts ==
Chart performance for "Medicine"
Chart (2019)	Peak position
Japan Digital Singles Chart (Oricon)	33
Japan Download Songs (Billboard)	44
Japan Hot Overseas (Billboard)	13
New Zealand Hot Singles (RMNZ)	20
Scotland (OCC)	56
UK Singles (OCC)	42
UK Rock & Metal (OCC)	2
US Hot Rock & Alternative Songs (Billboard)	9
US Rock & Alternative Airplay (Billboard)	46

== Certifications ==
Certifications for "Medicine"
Region	Certification	Certified units/sales
Australia (ARIA)	Gold	35,000^{‡}
Brazil (Pro-Música Brasil)	Gold	20,000^{‡}
United Kingdom (BPI)	Silver	200,000^{‡}
^{‡} Sales+streaming figures based on certification alone.
