= Nihilist Blues =

2019 song by British rock band Bring Me the Horizon featuring vocalist Grimes

Single by Bring Me the Horizon featuring Grimes

from the album Amo
- Released: 24 January 2019
- Genre: Synth-pop; electronic rock; electropop; trance
- Length: 5:25
- Label: Sony; RCA
- Songwriter(s): Jordan Fish; Matt Kean; Oliver Sykes; Matt Nicholls; Lee Malia; Amy Lee; Terry Balsamo; Tim McCord; William Hunt
- Producer(s): Oliver Sykes; Jordan Fish

Bring Me the Horizon singles chronology
| "Mother Tongue" (2019) | "Nihilist Blues" (2019) | "Sugar Honey Ice & Tea" (2019) |

Grimes singles chronology
| "We Appreciate Power" (2018) | "Nihilist Blues" (2019) | "Pretty Dark" (2019) |

Music video
- "Nihilist Blues" on YouTube

"Nihilist Blues" (stylised in all lowercase) is a song by British rock band Bring Me the Horizon featuring Canadian singer Grimes. Produced by the band's vocalist Oliver Sykes and keyboardist Jordan Fish, it is featured on the group's 2019 sixth studio album Amo. The track was released as the fifth single from the album on 24 January 2019. Evanescence have a songwriting credit, as it lifts vocal melodies from "Never Go Back".

== Composition and lyrics ==
"Nihilist Blues" has been described as a synth-pop, electronic rock, electropop, and trance song. The song talks principally about nihilism, focusing on the meaninglessness of life, existential crises and pessimism. According to an interview from Impericon, the song is Oliver Sykes' personal favourite one. Musically, "Nihilist Blues" sets inspiration from old disco and EDM songs. Fish commented about the collaboration:

"This is an example of us really going for it on this record. It's like this dark rave song or something—it's absolutely mental, and it might be my favourite on the whole album. I'm sure people will hear it and go, "What the fuck?" but whatever. It's very different in sound for us. We're big fans of Grimes and she loved the song. She actually sent it back with all these added elements which we weren't expecting, but she's super-creative and she'd completely gone to town on it. That elevated the song to a whole new level. She's someone we respect, and not really someone you'd expect to find working with a metal band. Or a rock band. Or whatever it is we are..."

== Music video ==
The music video for "Nihilist Blues" was released on the same day the single was streamed. AltPress described it as "a glitchy new way forward" for the band.

== Personnel ==
Credits adapted from Tidal.

Bring Me the Horizon

- Oliver Sykes – lead vocals
- Jordan Fish – keyboards, programming, percussion, backing vocals
- Lee Malia – guitars
- Matt Kean – bass
- Matt Nicholls – drums

Additional musicians

- Grimes – vocals
- Madilyn Eve Cutter – cello
- Gavin Kibble – cello
- Rachael Lander – cello
- Max Ruisi – cello
- Choir Noir – choir vocals
- Jessica Price – double bass
- Lewis Reed – double bass
- Alexander Verster – double bass
- Oliver Hickie – French horn
- Simon Dobson – strings, trumpet
- Parallax Orchestra – strings
- Ross Anderson – trombone
- Jane Salmon – trombone
- Victoria Rule – trumpet
- Anisa Arslanagic – viola
- Mark Gibbs – viola
- Benjamin Kaminski – viola

Additional personnel

- Dan Lancaster – mixing
- Rhys May – mixing
- Ted Jensen – mastering
- Roman Dodangoda – engineering
- Peter Miles – engineering
- Robbie Nelson – engineering
- Alejandro Baima – assistant engineering
- Francesco Cameli – assistant engineering
- Daniel Morris – assistant engineering
- Conor Panayi – assistant engineering

== Charts ==
Chart performance for "Nihilist Blues"
| Chart (2019) | Peak position |
|---|---|
| New Zealand Hot Singles (RMNZ) | 29 |
| UK Singles (OCC) | 77 |
| UK Rock & Metal (OCC) | 5 |
| US Hot Rock & Alternative Songs (Billboard) | 45 |
