= Wonderful Life (Bring Me the Horizon song) =

Single by Bring Me the Horizon featuring Dani Filth

from the album Amo
- Released: 21 October 2018
- Genre: Nu metal; hard rock
- Length: 4:34
- Label: Sony; RCA
- Songwriters: Jordan Fish; Matt Kean; Oliver Sykes; Matt Nicholls; Lee Malia
- Producers: Oliver Sykes; Jordan Fish

Bring Me the Horizon singles chronology
"Mantra" (2018)	"Wonderful Life" (2018)	"Medicine" (2019)

Music video
- "Wonderful Life" on YouTube

"Wonderful Life" is a song by British rock band Bring Me the Horizon featuring Cradle of Filth vocalist Dani Filth. Produced by the band's vocalist Oliver Sykes and keyboardist Jordan Fish, it is featured on the group's 2019 sixth studio album Amo. The track was released as the second single from the album on 21 October 2018.

== Promotion and release ==
The track was teased by Oliver Sykes on an Instagram live stream. After searching the tease on Shazam, fans discovered the name for the leaked song as "WONDERFUL LIFE" featuring Cradle of Filth vocalist Dani Filth as a guest. After it, Sykes posted a video on his Instagram account announcing the "Wonderful Life" release date to be 21 October on Radio 1.

== Composition and lyrics ==
"Wonderful Life" has been described as a nu metal and hard rock song. The song shows a troubled narrator barely holding on to life but constantly referring to it as wonderful. The narrator, who seems to hold a dark and depressing view of the world around him, still enjoys the mundane and often gloomy aspects of everydayness. Sykes said of the song's lyrics:

"The lyrics for 'Wonderful Life' were done freestyle in the studio. It's stream of consciousness-type stuff about getting old and out of touch, being off tour and loving the mundane things in life, I guess because it's so novel when your life is mainly spent on the road. Things like weekly shops and mowing your lawn are quite nice. People who spend most of their lives away from home can surely relate. I guess on top of that there's this inner crisis I have of being a boring person but still having a desire to go wild inside me every now and again… But, yeah, all in all, it's mostly word vomit... but also some of my favourite lyrics. The beginning is 100 percent legit and the irony was just too good, so we left it like that."

== Music video ==
The music video for "Wonderful Life" was released on the same day as the single was streamed. Directed by Theo Watkins, the video shows clips of the band doing everyday, mundane things. Dani Filth is seen wearing heavy corpse paint and sci-fi-esque stage clothing while eating cereal and shopping at the supermarket. Jordan Fish is shown playing with his son, Oliver Sykes is having his water boiler fixed and sitting on the sofa with his dog, Matt Kean is out running, Lee Malia is seen washing a camper van and mowing his lawn, and Matt Nicholls is shown walking his dog. It features appearances from Fish's real life son, Eliot Fish, and Sykes', Nicholls', and Fish's dogs Luna, Bud, and Bailey.

== Personnel ==
Credits adapted from Tidal.

Bring Me the Horizon

- Oliver Sykes – lead vocals, production, composition
- Lee Malia – guitars, composition
- Matt Kean – bass, composition
- Matt Nicholls – drums, composition
- Jordan Fish – keyboard, synthesizers, programming, percussion, backing vocals, production, composition, programming

Additional musicians

- Dani Filth – guest vocals
- Lewis Reid – contrabass
- Alexander Verster – contrabass
- Jessica Price – contrabass
- Parallax Orchestra – contrabass, strings
- Gavin Kibble – cello
- Rachael Lander – cello
- Max Ruisi – cello
- Madilyn Eve Cutter – cello
- Choir Noir – choir
- Oliver Hickie – French horn
- Ross Anderson – trombone
- Jane Salmon – trombone
- Simon Dobson – trumpet, strings
- Victoria Rule – trumpet
- Anisa Arslanagic – viola
- Benjamin Kaminski – viola
- Mark Gibbs – viola

Additional personnel

- Robbie Nelson – engineering
- Peter Miles – engineering
- Romesh Dodangoda – engineering
- Alejandro Baima – assistant engineering
- Conor Panayi – assistant engineering
- Francesco Cameli – assistant engineering
- Daniel Morris – assistant engineering
- Ted Jensen – mastering
- Rhys May – mixing
- Dan Lancaster – mixing

== In popular culture ==
"Wonderful Life" is featured in the soundtrack for the video game WWE 2K20, as well as one of the theme songs for NXT TakeOver: WarGames (2018).

== Charts ==
Chart performance for "Wonderful Life"
Chart (2018–19)	Peak position
Belgium (Ultratip Bubbling Under Flanders)	30
Scotland Singles (Official Charts)	83
UK Singles Sales (OCC)	89
UK Singles Downloads (Official Charts)	89
UK Rock & Metal (Official Charts)	8
US Hot Rock & Alternative Songs (Billboard)	33

== Certifications ==
Certifications for "Wonderful Life"
Region	Certification	Certified units/sales
Australia (ARIA)	Gold	35,000^{‡}
Brazil (Pro-Música Brasil)	Gold	20,000^{‡}
^{‡} Sales+streaming figures based on certification alone.
