= This Is What the Edge of Your Seat Was Made For =

EP by Bring Me the Horizon
- Released: 25 September 2004
- Recorded: 2004
- Studios: Pristine, Nottingham
- Genres: Metalcore; deathcore; mathcore
- Length: 18:27
- Labels: Thirty Days of Night; Visible Noise; Earache
- Producers: Johnny Carter; Paul Yeadon

Bring Me the Horizon chronology
The Bedroom Sessions (2004)	This Is What the Edge of Your Seat Was Made For (2004)	Count Your Blessings (2006)

This Is What the Edge of Your Seat Was Made For is the first EP by British metal band Bring Me the Horizon. It was released on 25 September 2004, through Thirty Days of Night Records in Australia and on 30 January 2005, through Visible Noise Records in the UK. The Visible Noise re-issue features a slightly altered artwork.

== Background ==
In early 2004, prior to being signed, the band created a 6-track collection of demo recordings. The artwork, which was handmade by vocalist Oliver Sykes, included the name of the EP's title though it's not clear if that was also the finalised title of the demo release. Some of these songs went under different titles and were reworked for the EP, though others were abandoned completely.

This Is What the Edge of Your Seat Was Made For was released on 25 September 2004 in the US through Earache Records. The original pressing, on Thirty Days of Night Records, was a strict run of only 1,000 copies. Its title comes from the first line of lyrics found in the track "Traitors Never Play Hang-Man.". According to an interview with the band, "Traitors Never Play Hang-Man." was originally two different songs. One being "Traitors Never Play Hang-Man", and the other called "We Are All Movie Stars". They played them live one after another to begin with but after a while they decided to join the two songs together into one.

The EP initially had its work being done with this song being two separate songs wherein the EP would be a five-track release that would include the songs: "Who Wants Flowers When You're Dead? Nobody", "Dagger", "Passe Compose", "Traitors Never Play Hang-man." and "We Are All Movie Stars". The artwork was different as well, with the cover featuring the band's logo with a sparrow in the corner of the cover standing about a bottle of leaking love hearts.

== Reception ==
=== Critical reception ===
Professional ratings
Review scores
Source	Rating
AllMusic	2/5 stars
Drowned in Sound	8/10
Gigwise	2/5 stars

This Is What the Edge of Your Seat Was Made For received mixed reviews from critics.

Mike Diver of Drowned in Sound praised the EP, saying it's "full of real promise" and that the "songs are tough, brutal, and more punk than Johnny Rotten undercrackers worn for five days solid."

Reviewing the EP for AllMusic, Eduardo Rivadavia described the release as "pretty boys making ugly music." He referred to the music as "very challenging, but never boring," noting an influence from bands such as Job for a Cowboy and The Red Chord. He concluded his review by saying the band "may just have enough personality to compete." Michelle Evans of Gigwise said the "lyrics and song explanations smack of youthful naivety" and that there's nothing wrong with the EP, "but nothing fantastic either." She called the musicianship good and competent, but not exceptional and un-inspiring.

Jack Rogers writing for Rock Sound reviewed the song "RE: They Have No Reflections" and commented that it is "Scrappy, heavy and completely and utterly debauched".

=== Accolades ===
- The EP won "The Most Brootal E.P of the Year" 2004 in a poll published in the alternative music magazine ABM.
- The track "Who Wants Flowers When You're Dead? Nobody" was included in NME's special edition magazine titled "501 Lost Songs", where it was listed in the metal section of the countdown with eleven other songs by bands such as Metallica, Slipknot and Marilyn Manson.
- Kerrang! included "Who Wants Flowers When You're Dead? Nobody" on its list of "11 lesser known Bring Me the Horizon songs that everyone needs to hear" in 2021.

== Track listing ==
All lyrics are written by Oli Sykes; all music is composed by Bring Me the Horizon.

No.	Title	Length
1.	"RE: They Have No Reflections"	5:42
2.	"Who Wants Flowers When You're Dead? Nobody"	4:54
3.	"Rawwwrr!"	4:14
4.	"Traitors Never Play Hang-Man."	3:37
Total length:		18:27

=== Notes ===
- "RE: They Have No Reflections" is stylised as "re: they have no reflections"
- "Who Wants Flowers When You're Dead? Nobody" is stylised as "who wants flowers when you're dead? nobody"
- "Rawwwrr!" is stylised as "RAWWWRR!"
- "Traitors Never Play Hang-Man." is stylised as "Traitors never Play Hang-man."

== Personnel ==
Bring Me the Horizon

- Oli Sykes – vocals, artwork
- Lee Malia – lead guitar
- Curtis Ward – rhythm guitar
- Matt Kean – bass
- Matt Nicholls – drums

Additional personnel

- Johnny Carter – production
- Paul Yeadon – production, engineering
- Tom Barnes – photography
