= Suicide Season =

Studio album by Bring Me the Horizon
- Released: 29 September 2008
- Recorded: 2008
- Studios: Studio Fredman, Hyssna, Sweden
- Genre: Metalcore
- Length: 42:10
- Labels: Visible Noise; Epitaph
- Producers: Fredrik Nordström; Henrik Udd

Bring Me the Horizon chronology
Count Your Blessings (2006)	Suicide Season (2008)	There Is a Hell... (2010)

Cut Up! edition

Suicide Season is the second studio album by British rock band Bring Me the Horizon. It was released on 29 September 2008 in the United Kingdom and Europe through Visible Noise. The band signed a licensing deal with Epitaph Records on 11 September 2008, with the label releasing the album on 18 November 2008 in the United States.

The album shows a major change musically from their previous releases, starting to shift from their original deathcore sound, to a metalcore approach. This would also be the last album to feature Curtis Ward on rhythm guitar. The band later released a two disc special edition of Suicide Season which features various musicians and producers remixing tracks off the album, entitled Suicide Season: Cut Up!; this was released on 2 November 2009 in the United Kingdom through Visible Noise and on 12 April 2010 in the United States through Epitaph.

Suicide Season did not spawn singles, but "The Comedown", "Chelsea Smile", "Diamonds Aren't Forever" and "The Sadness Will Never End" all were promoted with music videos. The album debuted on the charts of five countries. Critically, the album received a more positive response than the band's preceding debut. While praised for the genre shift, improved musicianship and newfound lyrical maturity compared to the style of 2006's Count Your Blessings, the album continued to receive critique for elements of the lyricism and some were polarized over the change of sound from Count Your Blessings. The album has begun receiving even more favourable retrospective analysis, notably surrounding Bring Me the Horizon's later critical acclaim.

== Background and recording ==
After the release of band's first studio album 2006's Count Your Blessings, the band began experiencing an extremely hateful reaction from people to their music. They cited that very few publications featured them and in drummer Matt Nicholls' opinion, the band had gathered strong hatred from 'proper metalheads'. For example, when the band supported Killswitch Engage in 2007, the crowd began throwing bottles at the band before their set had even started. When preparing the music for Suicide Season, vocalist Oliver Sykes and lead guitarist Lee Malia agreed that this record would be the "make-or-break" factor for the band and that it had to be different from Count Your Blessings.

Suicide Season was written and recorded in Arboga, an isolated Swedish village with producer Fredrik Nordström. Lead vocalist Oliver Sykes described Arboga as "Nowheresville". Sykes considered the isolation Arboga provided as ideal in comparison to the constant activity in Birmingham, the recording location of their first album: "We recorded Count Your Blessings in the middle of Birmingham and it was very easy to get distracted. Arboga is a village with nothing in it apart from a tiny shop and that was it". During the initial recording of the album, Nordström initially was absent from working with the band, in Sykes perspective, he drew his own conclusion based on Count Your Blessings. However, he turned up midway through their recording process and was shocked by the music they had written, and from that point became more involved in the recording process. Nordström also taught the band some basic levels of recording and production so they could work through the night. By the end of the album, he said it was "one of the best CDs he's done in years".

The album cover features a girl holding her intestines. Sykes explains this in an interview, stating: "The whole idea behind the cover is that the girl [on the cover] has her intestines out and it's about spilling your guts basically, and opening up to the world."

Whilst in Arboga, the band caused a controversy and lit an unlit, prepared bonfire in the middle of the forest. They were put in the local paper for destroying a pagan celebration.

The album features guest appearances from vocalist JJ Peters of Deez Nuts, Sam Carter of Architects and Luis Dubuc of The Secret Handshake. (Note: Sam Carter flew over with Rock Sound photographer Tom Barnes)

== Composition ==
=== Influences, style and themes ===
Suicide Season departs from Bring Me the Horizon's previous deathcore sound. The band was subsequently credited for adopting a more eclectic style and moving into a more "straight-up" metalcore sound. In an interview with Metal Hammer magazine, Sykes states that this album is "100% different" from Count Your Blessings. He also says: "We experimented a lot more I think, more with other styles of music we all enjoy, using different instruments and technology, by bringing a lot of digital stuff to the table. Every track is different." Because of this drastic change in sound from Count Your Blessings, they experienced a massive fanbase shift.

Sykes has stated that the band was better focused when in the studio, which made it easier for them to experiment with song writing and to expand their sound: "We didn't really have any other band we wanted to sound like or any other style. We just thought we'd try to do something different and see what comes out. And this is what came out."

The remix album Suicide Season: Cut Up! style has a range of different genres. Oliver Sykes in Interview states that "There's not a song on there that really sounds like the original. What's great though is the diversity of each song. There's dubstep to hip-hop, electro to drum and bass." The dubstep style of the record has been acknowledged in tracks from Tek-one and Skrillex while the hip-hop elements are found in Travis McCoy's remix of "Chelsea Smile". Benjamin Weinman's version of "No Need for Introductions..." is considerably the most unusual with its incorporation of industrial music.

== Promotion and release ==
Visible Noise Records produced a site dedicated to the promotion of the album. It featured a clock counting down to 29 September (the album's release date), and a scroll-over page in which the visitor can reveal an image of the album's artwork.

The band also put a countdown to the release of the album in the United Kingdom. They also headlined in the United Kingdom, Europe, and the United States. The support acts included The Red Shore, Deez Nuts, The Secret Handshake, Dead Swans, The Legacy, Misery Signals, Johnny Truant, The Ghost Inside, and Confide. The album was released on 22 September through Visible Noise. (Note: Suicide Season was released under the Enhanced CD format and includes a music video for "The Comedown", along with downloadable desktop wallpapers.)

The first promotional video from Suicide Season was released on 12 August 2008 on the Visible Noise Myspace page, entitled "The Comedown". On 15 August, "Chelsea Smile" was released on the band's Myspace page.

The CD format of the album features a label stating the name of the album over the intestines on the cover.

It was announced on 27 August 2009 that Bring Me the Horizon would be releasing a remixed version of Suicide Season, titled Suicide Season: Cut Up!, and it was released in the United Kingdom on 2 November 2009 and was later released in the United States on 12 April 2010. The origin of the album concept was that Oliver Sykes asked a friend to remix one of their songs, and the band was very pleased with the end result so the band decided to have all of Suicide Season remixed. Musicians and producers featured on the album include: Ben Weinman from The Dillinger Escape Plan, Skrillex, L'Amour La Morgue, KC Blitz, Utah Saints and Shawn "Clown" Crahan from Slipknot. Guitarist Lee Malia noted how they compiled the release to fulfil a contractual obligation to re-release the album.

In October 2011, it was awarded a gold certification from the Independent Music Companies Association which indicated sales of at least 75,000 copies throughout Europe.

== Critical reception ==
Professional ratings
Review scores
Source	Rating
AbsolutePunk	(67%)
AllMusic	4/5 stars
Decibel	8/10
Metal Hammer	3.5/5 stars
Punknews.org	1.5/5 stars
RockLouder	3/5 stars
Thrash Hits	4.5/6 stars

Upon its release, the album was met with a warmer reception than the band's debut: Count Your Blessings. While some were not so pleased with the change in direction from the earlier deathcore sound of the band's previous album and the lyric writing continued to receive some criticism in certain areas, Suicide Season was generally seen as a notable improvement over their debut record, with praise aimed at the shift in sound to a more refined musical direction rooted in metalcore, the more mature songwriting and the instrumentation, along with its willingness to experiment with elements of other genres. Tom Forget of AllMusic wrote that the album is filled with "Intricately constructed and refreshingly unpredictable songs", citing Bring Me the Horizon as one of Britain's first metalcore bands to "make any waves." Phillip May praised the band's ditching of deathcore and new adoption of metalcore, writing on RockLouder that "One of Suicide Season's greatest assets is its sense of menace. BMTH were always meant to be a terrifying prospect, but Count Your Blessings was so messy its attempts to be something dangerous were laughable. But here, by allowing layers and riffs time to breathe, efforts like the title track prove far more intimidating than any lightning-paced deathcore mush ever could." Ryan Williams of Thrash Hits gave the album a rating of 4.5 out of 6, writing that although some of Sykes' lyrics are "cheap", "It's easy to focus on the obvious and the silly but there are some seriously strong developments to BMTH's newly-matured music. The results are occasionally astounding."

A review on IGN was positive, pointing out that although there are some weak songs on the album, it is "a great departure from their previous effort", and goes on to say "All in all this is an album to write home about."

A review of the album on Punknews.org was far more critical of the album, stating "there is "substance" here—there are guitar solos, tempo changes, gang vocals—but there isn't substance. There's no authenticity; it just seems like the songs were built from a collection of "brutal" ideas written on pieces of paper, put together in a hat, and splashed out on the floor." The album received a 1.5 out of 5 rating. A review on AbsolutePunk was also critical of the album, stating that while some songs were "heavy, but catchy" and "sounds like it would have a room full of people moshing until they drop", at some points it feels like the band is "half-arseing it", going on to say "Sometimes you wish they would throw in some thrash beats, and fast riffing. This can disappoint and I feel like a few solo's [sic] wouldn't go amiss." However, the reviewer concludes by saying "All in all, Suicide Season has impressed me. The boys from BMTH have come back and shown they aren't just a generic haircuts band."

=== Retrospect ===
There isn't an artist in the world who doesn't listen to an album that they've done and go, 'I could have done that better', but I think on the whole, in every aspect of recording and just the way we did it, we did ourselves proud with that album.

— Singer Oliver Sykes in an interview, 2012.

As Bring Me the Horizon received more recognition and acclaim, Suicide Season has been looked upon more fondly than when it was first released. In 2012, when Rock Sound inducted the record into their "Hall of Fame", the band members reflected on Suicide Season positively. Jamie Kossoff, one of the remixers on the Cut Up! edition of the album, noted that electronic and dance music remixes of heavy music were not common before the Cut Up! edition was released.

=== Accolades ===
Publication	Country	Accolade	Year	Rank
Kerrang!	UK	The 50 Heaviest Albums Ever Made	2011	21
Rock Sound	UK	Rock Sound's Hall of Fame	2012	—

== Track listing ==
All lyrics are written by Oli Sykes; all music is composed by Bring Me the Horizon (Oli Sykes, Matt Nicholls, Curtis Ward, Matt Kean, Lee Malia).

No.	Title	Length
1.	"The Comedown"	4:09
2.	"Chelsea Smile"	5:02
3.	"It Was Written in Blood"	4:02
4.	"Death Breath"	4:20
5.	"Football Season Is Over" (featuring JJ Peters)	1:55
6.	"Sleep with One Eye Open"	4:16
7.	"Diamonds Aren't Forever"	3:48
8.	"The Sadness Will Never End" (featuring Sam Carter)	5:22
9.	"No Need for Introductions, I've Read About Girls Like You on the Backs of Toilet Doors."	0:59
10.	"Suicide Season"	8:17
Total length:		42:10

Enhanced material
No.	Title	Length
1.	"The Comedown" (music video)	4:16
2.	"Pray for Plagues" (music video)	4:23

Suicide Season: Cut Up!
No.	Title	Length
1.	"The Comedown" (Robotsonics remix)	5:17
2.	"Chelsea Smile" (KC Blitz remix)	4:12
3.	"It Was Written in Blood" (L'Amour La Morgue remix)	4:57
4.	"Death Breath" (Toxic Avenger remix)	4:33
5.	"Football Season Is Over" (After the Night remix)	3:56
6.	"Sleep with One Eye Open" (Tek-One remix)	4:41
7.	"Diamonds Aren't Forever" (I Haunt Wizards remix)	3:54
8.	"The Sadness Will Never End" (Skrillex remix)	6:02
9.	"No Need for Introductions, I've Read About Girls Like You on the Backs of Toilet Doors." (Ben Weinman remix)	2:45
10.	"Suicide Season" (The Secret Handshake remix)	2:55
11.	"Football Season Is Over" (Utah Saints remix)	5:02
12.	"Sleep with One Eye Open" (Shawn "Clown" Crahan remix)	5:54
13.	"Chelsea Smile" (Travis McCoy remix)	3:42
14.	"Suicide Season" (Outcry Collective remix)	5:05
Total length:		62:55

Enhanced material
No.	Title	Length
1.	"Chelsea Smile" (live in Siberia)	5:55
2.	"The Sadness Will Never End" (live in Siberia)	5:03
3.	"It Was Written in Blood" (live in Siberia)	3:56

Deluxe edition bonus DVD
No.	Title	Length
1.	"Live in Mexico City" (concert)
2.	"Live in Siberia" (concert)
3.	"The Comedown" (music video)	4:35
4.	"Chelsea Smile" (music video)	4:13
5.	"Diamonds Aren't Forever" (music video)	3:59
6.	"The Sadness Will Never End" (music video)	4:42

Notes

Most variants of this release come with one or more printing errors on the front and back:

- Some LP pressings give the band name as "Bring Me Me the Horizon" on the front cover.
- Track 6 is often written as "Sleep wtth One Eye Open" on the tracklist. In the booklet, it's printed correctly.
- Track 7 is sometimes written as "...Back So Toilet Doors" and, more often, as "...Back of Toilet Doors" on the tracklist. In the booklet, it's printed correctly as "...Backs of Toilet Doors" and also includes a dot at the end.

== Personnel ==
Bring Me the Horizon

- Oli Sykes – vocals
- Lee Malia – guitar
- Curtis Ward – guitar
- Matt Kean – bass
- Matt Nicholls – drums

Additional musicians

- JJ Peters of Deez Nuts – guest vocals on "Football Season Is Over"
- Sam Carter of Architects – guest clean vocals on "The Sadness Will Never End"
- The Secret Handshake – samples on "Chelsea Smile"

Additional personnel

- Fredrik Nordström and Henrik Udd – production, mixing
- Peter In De Betou – mastering at Tailormaid, Sweden

== Charts ==
Chart performance for Suicide Season
Chart (2008)	Peak position
Australian Albums (ARIA)	28
Dutch Albums (Album Top 100)	99
Scottish Albums (Official Charts)	58
Swedish Albums (Sverigetopplistan)	27
UK Albums (Official Charts)	47
UK Rock & Metal Albums (Official Charts)	3
US Billboard 200	107
US Heatseekers Albums (Billboard)	2
US Independent Albums (Billboard)	9
US Top Alternative Albums (Billboard)	18
US Top Catalog Albums (Billboard)	17
US Top Hard Rock Albums (Billboard)	17

Chart performance for Suicide Season
Chart (2026)	Peak position
Belgian Albums (Ultratop Flanders)	191
UK Rock & Metal Albums (Official Charts)	4

== Certifications ==
Region	Certification	Certified units/sales
United Kingdom (BPI)	Silver	60,000^{‡}
^{‡} Sales+streaming figures based on certification alone.
