= Mother Tongue (Bring Me the Horizon song) =

2019 single by Bring Me the Horizon

Single by Bring Me the Horizon

from the album Amo
- Released: 22 January 2019
- Genre: Pop rock; dance-pop; pop metal
- Length: 3:37
- Label: Sony; RCA
- Songwriters: Jordan Fish; Matt Kean; Oliver Sykes; Matt Nicholls; Lee Malia
- Producers: Oliver Sykes; Jordan Fish

Bring Me the Horizon singles chronology
"Medicine" (2019)	"Mother Tongue" (2019)	"Nihilist Blues" (2019)

Music video
- "Mother Tongue" on YouTube

"Mother Tongue" is a song by British rock band Bring Me the Horizon. Produced by the band's vocalist Oliver Sykes and keyboardist Jordan Fish, it is featured on the group's 2019 sixth studio album Amo. The track was released as the fourth single from the album on 22 January 2019 and has spent twelve non-consecutive weeks on the UK Rock & Metal Singles Chart as of July 2019.

== Composition and lyrics ==
"Mother Tongue" has been described as a pop rock, dance-pop, and pop metal song. According to Jordan Fish, "Mother Tongue" is the spiritual successor of "Drown". The track is a love song dedicated to Oliver Sykes' wife, Alissa Salls. Fish said of the song:

"Vocal-wise it's quite a big song. There's a little bit of Portuguese in there, which is quite unusual. It's kind of a big, anthemic song. It's probably as close as we get to something like "Drown" on this album. It's a love song, so it's an emotional one."

== Music video ==
The music video for "Mother Tongue" was released via YouTube on 9 May 2019. It was filmed in the city of São Paulo, Brazil.

== Charts ==
Chart performance for "Mother Tongue"
Chart (2019)	Peak position
Czech Republic Airplay (ČNS IFPI)	16
New Zealand Hot Singles (RMNZ)	27
UK Singles (Official Charts)	68
UK Rock & Metal (Official Charts)	4
US Hot Rock & Alternative Songs (Billboard)	23

== Certifications ==
Certifications for "Mother Tongue"
Region	Certification	Certified units/sales
Brazil (Pro-Música Brasil)	Gold	20,000^{‡}
^{‡} Sales+streaming figures based on certification alone.
