= Avalanche (Bring Me the Horizon song) =

Single by Bring Me the Horizon

from the album That's the Spirit
- Released: 27 June 2016
- Genre: Arena rock
- Length: 4:22 (album version); 3:29 (radio edit)
- Label: Sony; RCA
- Songwriters: Oliver Sykes; Jordan Fish; Lee Malia; Matt Kean; Matt Nicholls
- Producers: Jordan Fish; Oliver Sykes

Bring Me the Horizon singles chronology
"Follow You" (2016)	"Avalanche" (2016)	"Oh No" (2016)

Music video
- "Avalanche" on YouTube

"Avalanche" is a song by British rock band Bring Me the Horizon. Produced by keyboardist Jordan Fish and vocalist Oliver Sykes, it was featured on the band's 2015 fifth studio album That's the Spirit. The song was also released as the sixth single from the album on 27 June 2016, reaching number 97 on the UK Singles Chart and number seven on the UK Rock & Metal Singles Chart.

== Promotion and release ==
The first preview of "Avalanche" was released on 31 August 2015 in the form of a 30-second teaser trailer, alongside another for the song "What You Need". The full song was premiered on Annie Mac's show on BBC Radio 1 on 9 September, two days before the release of That's the Spirit. "Avalanche" was not performed live until 22 April 2016, when it received its live debut (along with That's the Spirit closing track "Oh No") at the band's landmark performance at the Royal Albert Hall with the Parallax Orchestra, which was recorded for December's Live at the Royal Albert Hall release. Since this show, the song has made several appearances in the band's live set lists.

== Composition and lyrics ==
According to Bring Me the Horizon vocalist Oliver Sykes, "Avalanche" is the band's attempt at creating "a stadium-sounding anthem" in the vein of bands such as U2. Keyboardist Jordan Fish echoed the influence of 1980s "arena rock" on the song, which Sykes claimed was not intended merely for the purposes of "getting big". Rock Sound writer Andy Biddulph described the song as featuring "rumbling, widescreen rock" and "powerful lyrics", compared its style to that of Linkin Park, particularly in terms of its "huge, open chords and Oli's raking vocal performance". David Renshaw of the NME noted the song's "singalong choruses and driving, expansive production", comparing it in these respects to "Throne".

Lyrically, "Avalanche" is a song about attention deficit hyperactivity disorder (ADHD), with which Sykes was diagnosed prior to the release of That's the Spirit. Identifying the diagnosis as a factor in his recovery from drug addiction, the vocalist noted the lyric "Cut me open and tell me what's inside" as indicative of his headspace at the time of writing the song. In a review of the album for the Alternative Press, Tom Bryant proposed that the lyrics and the music juxtapose with one another, describing the song as "melancholy, epic and uplifting all at once: "I feel like suicide," Sykes sings, but the swelling synths behind him seem to say, "Oh, cheer up."" Fuse's Maria Sherman noted its "self-deprecating chorus".

In a Reddit AMA ("Ask Me Anything"), bassist Matt Kean revealed that "Avalanche" was his favourite song on That's the Spirit. Fish claimed that it was "probably [his] favourite" too in a 2016 interview, despite previously favouring the album's opener "Doomed".

== Music video ==
The music video for "Avalanche" was released on 23 June 2016. Directed by Tom Sykes, brother of the band's vocalist Oliver, it features footage of the band performing live at various shows throughout early 2016, including the landmark show at the Royal Albert Hall in April. Loudwire's Chad Childers outlined that the video "features a mix of day and night shots, with the evening performances giving viewers a glimpse of the light wall that typically backs the band onstage. You also see the full-on energy and vibe of a Bring Me the Horizon show, complete with a crowd separating and staging a wall of death". Speaking about the video, director Sykes described the production process as "a lot of work but extremely rewarding", adding that the brothers had subsequently set up a company called Fun Blood in order to work together on more projects in the future.

== Critical reception ==
Media response to "Avalanche" was generally positive. Andy Biddulph of Rock Sound praised "Avalanche" as a "string-laden, wistful ballad", claiming that it is "ready-made for pyro blasts and sold-out arenas". Tom Bryant of Alternative Press claimed that it reflected the overall message of the album in general: "Everything's screwed, but what are you going to do about it?" Loudwire's Chad Childers described the track as "one of the more anthemic songs in the band's catalog". Amy Gravelle from Gigwise compared it to Bullet for My Valentine for its "weary guitar licks" and "choral build ups", but criticised its "mainstream blunder", calling it a "disappointing lull".

== In popular culture ==
- In 2016, "Avalanche" was used during ITV's UEFA Euros group stage coverage of Italy vs Sweden.

== Commercial performance ==
"Avalanche" entered the UK Rock & Metal Singles Chart at number 7 on 18 September 2015 following the release of That's the Spirit, when it also registered on the main UK Singles Chart for a solitary week at number 97. The song remained in the top 40 of the UK Rock & Metal Singles Chart until December. In the United States, the track reached number 32 on the Billboard Twitter Top Tracks chart.

== Personnel ==
Credits adapted from Tidal.

Bring Me the Horizon

- Oliver Sykes – lead vocals, production, composition, programming
- Lee Malia – guitars, composition
- Matt Kean – bass, composition
- Matt Nicholls – drums, composition
- Jordan Fish – keyboards, synthesizers, programming, percussion, backing vocals, production, composition, engineering

Additional musicians

- Maddie Cutter – cello
- Will Harvey – violin

Additional personnel

- Al Groves – engineering
- Sam Winfield – engineering
- Nikos Goudinakis – assistant engineering
- Ted Jensen – mastering
- Dan Lancaster – mixing

== Charts ==
Chart performance for "Avalanche"
Chart (2015)	Peak position
UK Singles (Official Charts)	97
UK Rock & Metal (Official Charts)	7
US Twitter Top Tracks (Billboard)	32

== Certifications ==
Certifications for "Avalanche"
Region	Certification	Certified units/sales
Australia (ARIA)	Gold	35,000^{‡}
United Kingdom (BPI)	Silver	200,000^{‡}
^{‡} Sales+streaming figures based on certification alone.
