= Oh No (Bring Me the Horizon song) =

Single by Bring Me the Horizon

from the album That's the Spirit
- Released: 18 November 2016
- Genre: Pop rock
- Length: 5:01 (album version); 3:53 (radio edit)
- Label: Sony; RCA
- Songwriters: Oliver Sykes; Jordan Fish; Lee Malia; Matt Kean; Matt Nicholls
- Producers: Jordan Fish; Oliver Sykes

Bring Me the Horizon singles chronology
"Avalanche" (2016)	"Oh No" (2016)	"Mantra" (2018)

Music video
- "Oh No" on YouTube

"Oh No" is a song by British rock band Bring Me the Horizon. Produced by keyboardist Jordan Fish and vocalist Oliver Sykes, it was featured on the band's 2015 fifth studio album That's the Spirit, when it reached number 166 on the UK Singles Chart and number ten on the UK Rock & Metal Singles Chart. It was later released as the seventh and final single from the album on 18 November 2016.

== Promotion and release ==
"Oh No" was not performed live until 22 April 2016, when it received its live debut (along with previous single "Avalanche") at the band's landmark performance at the Royal Albert Hall with the Parallax Orchestra, which was recorded for December's Live at the Royal Albert Hall release. Since this show, the song has made several appearances in the band's live set lists. "Oh No" was released as the seventh single from That's the Spirit on 18 November 2016.

== Composition and lyrics ==
"Oh No" has been described as one of the "softer" tracks on That's the Spirit in reviews of the album. In a pre-release track-by-track feature on the album, Rock Sound writer Andy Biddulph outlined that the song features vocalist Oliver Sykes "singing mournfully ... while the band around him build to a lush, textured chorus", adding that "there's almost no guitar here, but the high-tempo drumming, electronics and hard-hitting subject matter make this band sound heavier than ever". The Guardian writer Lanre Bakare categorised the song as "more dance than nu-metal", noting that it also features a "trance breakdown". The section in question appears near the end of the song and is characterised by the presence of a brass section with a saxophone solo on top. Bradley Zorgdrager of Exclaim! compared the track's style to the work of "post-reunion Fall Out Boy". Upon the release of the song's music video, "Oh No" was dubbed as pop rock by the Ultimate Guitar Archive.

In a track-by-track commentary of That's the Spirit for Spotify, Sykes explained that "'Oh No' is meant to be like this anti-dance song ... it's all about people who live for the weekend and people that's [sic] my age, 30 something or older ... still trying to live like [they're] 18 or 21. They're trying hard to have fun they don't even realise that they're probably not even having any". The song also features references to drug addiction. The "anti-dance" lyrics are intended to juxtapose the dance-heavy style of the song, which the vocalist added is meant to sound "like something you'd hear in a club". Speaking about the brass section and saxophone solo, Sykes explained that he "wanted this final part of the album to feel like when the lights come on at a club or a bar and you get that slightly shitty song feeling. It's like all good things must come to an end."

In a Reddit AMA ("Ask Me Anything"), guitarist Lee Malia revealed that "Oh No" was his favourite song on That's the Spirit.

== Music video ==
The music video for "Oh No" was directed by Isaac Eastgate and released on the Rolling Stone website on 3 November 2016. The video depicts a developing hostage situation, intercut with footage from a recording studio and, later, a "strange, clay-like baby" playing a trumpet. Speaking about the video, Sykes noted that "This is the first video I've took a step back from creatively and let the director take full control", adding that while he was initially "apprehensive" about the idea behind the video, he found that it had "a good balance of humor and meaning" and praised it for leaving the viewer "with a lot of questions".

== Critical reception ==
Media response to "Oh No" was mixed. Rock Sound writer Andy Biddulph claimed that the song's experimental style is "typical of one of the most groundbreaking albums this genre has seen for years", while Eleanor Goodman of Metal Hammer also hailed it as "testament to the band's truly evolutionary spirit". On the other hand, Exclaim! critic Bradley Zorgdrager criticised "Oh No", claiming that it feels "even more misplaced coming after one of the more guitar-driven numbers, 'Blasphemy.'" Reviewing the Royal Albert Hall show for The Independent, Steve Anderson described "Oh No" as "almost Robyn-esque thudding electro", claiming that it "illustrat[ed] what a bizarre journey" the band had taken to that point.

== Commercial performance ==
"Oh No" entered the UK Rock & Metal Singles Chart at number 10 on 18 September 2015 following the release of That's the Spirit, when it also registered on the main UK Singles Chart for a solitary week at number 166. The song remained in the top 40 of the UK Rock & Metal Singles Chart for four weeks. Following the release of the song's music video, "Oh No" re-entered the UK Rock & Metal Singles Chart at number 22.

== Personnel ==
Credits adapted from Tidal.

Bring Me the Horizon

- Oliver Sykes – lead vocals, production, composition, programming
- Lee Malia – guitars, composition
- Matt Kean – bass, composition
- Matt Nicholls – drums, composition
- Jordan Fish – keyboards, synthesizers, programming, percussion, backing vocals, production, composition, engineering

Additional musicians

- Maddie Cutter – cello
- Will Harvey – violin

Additional personnel

- Al Groves – engineering
- Sam Winfield – engineering
- Nikos Goudinakis – assistant engineering
- Ted Jensen – mastering
- Dan Lancaster – mixing

== Charts ==
Chart performance for "Oh No"
Chart (2015–16)	Peak position
Belgium (Ultratop 50 Flanders)	43
Mexico Ingles Airplay (Billboard)	32
UK Singles (OCC)	166
UK Rock & Metal (OCC)	10
