= Mantra (Bring Me the Horizon song) =

Single by Bring Me the Horizon

from the album Amo
- Released: 21 August 2018
- Genre: Hard rock; alternative rock; electronic rock; pop rock; pop metal
- Length: 3:53
- Label: Sony; RCA
- Songwriters: Jordan Fish; Matt Kean; Oliver Sykes; Matt Nicholls; Lee Malia
- Producers: Oliver Sykes; Jordan Fish

Bring Me the Horizon singles chronology
"Oh No" (2016)	"Mantra" (2018)	"Wonderful Life" (2018)

Audio sample
- file; help

Music video
- "Mantra" on YouTube

"Mantra" (often stylised in all caps) is a song by British rock band Bring Me the Horizon. Produced by the band's vocalist Oliver Sykes and keyboardist Jordan Fish, it is featured on the group's 2019 sixth studio album Amo. The track was released as the lead single from the album on 21 August 2018, topping the UK Rock & Metal Singles Chart and spending three weeks at that spot.

== Promotion and release ==
Bring Me the Horizon released "Mantra" as their first new material since That's the Spirit on 21 August 2018, the day before the band's sixth studio album Amo was announced. The song was originally teased with a promotional campaign including a billboard in London, which featured the lyric "Do you wanna start a cult with me?" The billboard also contained a phone number that contained a sample of the track, and the website joinmantra.com was set up to reveal the single's release date. The group performed the track live for the first time at Reading Festival on 23 August, followed by a performance at Leeds Festival the following day.

== Composition and lyrics ==
"Mantra" has been described as a hard rock, alternative rock, electronic rock, pop rock, and pop metal song. Speaking to music magazine Metal Hammer, vocalist Oliver Sykes revealed that "Mantra" was inspired by Wild Wild Country, a documentary about controversial Indian guru Bhagwan Shree Rajneesh, explaining that "As I was watching it and trying to write lyrics at the same time, I was drawing these similarities to cults and love." Moving on to speak about the lyrics, he added that "Starting a relationship – especially a marriage – is like starting a cult, a small two-man cult, because you have to give yourself over completely to this person, you have to trust them, you have to love them unconditionally ... so that's where the thinking behind the song came from".

Musically, "Mantra" is described by NME writer Tom Connick as featuring "a twisted, glitchy electronica intro" followed by a "festival-headline-baiting chorus", contributing to a sound that he claims is "built for huge stages". Connick goes on to claim that the electronic elements of the song "add atmosphere".

== Music video ==
The music video for "Mantra" was released on 24 August 2018, three days after the song was first made available. According to music website Consequence of Sound, the video "depicts frontman Oli Sykes as a cult leader, as his followers hang on his every word". Revolver magazine's John Hill outlined that "The visuals in the video clash repeatedly, elements of video games, late-night infomercials, and church sermons all run on a closed loop next to each other for a vicious effect", describing it as "crazy". Similarly, Emmy Mack of Music Feeds dubbed the video "batshit crazy".

== Reception ==
=== Critical ===
Tom Connick of the NME praised "Mantra" as "an inventive cut of ballsy, bluesy modern rock, fit for stadiums and headline slots", highlighting the electronic elements of the song and the vocal performance of Oliver Sykes. Axl Rosenberg of MetalSucks criticised the song, calling it "drek" and joking, "If you hate everyone in your immediate vicinity, turn your speakers way up and crank 'Mantra'."

=== Accolades ===
In 2019, "Mantra" was nominated for the Best Rock Song category at the 61st Grammy Awards and was also nominated for Best Song at the Kerrang! Awards.

== Personnel ==
Credits adapted from Tidal.

Bring Me the Horizon

- Oliver Sykes – lead vocals, production, composition
- Lee Malia – guitars, composition
- Matt Kean – bass, composition
- Matt Nicholls – drums, composition
- Jordan Fish – keyboards, synthesizers, programming, percussion, backing vocals, production, composition

Additional personnel

- Romesh Dodangoda – engineering
- Ted Jensen – mastering
- Dan Lancaster – mixing

== In popular culture ==
- "Mantra" is featured on the soundtrack for the 2020 video game Watch Dogs: Legion.
- "Mantra" was played during an episode of MTV's 34th season of The Challenge.

== Charts ==
=== Weekly charts ===
Weekly chart performance for "Mantra"
Chart (2018)	Peak position
Australia (ARIA)	113
Australia Digital Tracks (ARIA)	33
Belgium (Ultratip Bubbling Under Flanders)	7
Belgium (Ultratip Bubbling Under Wallonia)	37
Canada Rock (Billboard)	45
Czech Republic Singles Digital (ČNS IFPI)	93
Germany Alternative (Deutsche Alternative Charts)	10
Hungary (Single Top 40)	14
Mexico Ingles Airplay (Billboard)	31
New Zealand Hot Singles (RMNZ)	35
Scottish Singles Sales (Official Charts)	45
Slovakia Singles Digital (ČNS IFPI)	94
UK Singles (Official Charts)	55
UK Rock & Metal (Official Charts)	1
US Hot Rock & Alternative Songs (Billboard)	15
US Rock & Alternative Airplay (Billboard)	23

=== Year-end charts ===
Year-end chart performance for "Mantra"
Chart (2018)	Position
US Hot Rock Songs (Billboard)	92

== Certifications ==
Certifications for "Mantra"
Region	Certification	Certified units/sales
Australia (ARIA)	Platinum	70,000^{‡}
Brazil (Pro-Música Brasil)	Gold	20,000^{‡}
United Kingdom (BPI)	Silver	200,000^{‡}
^{‡} Sales+streaming figures based on certification alone.

== Cover versions ==
In 2020, Japanese girl group Passcode covered the song on their official YouTube channel.
