= Matt Kean (musician) =

British bassist (born 1986)

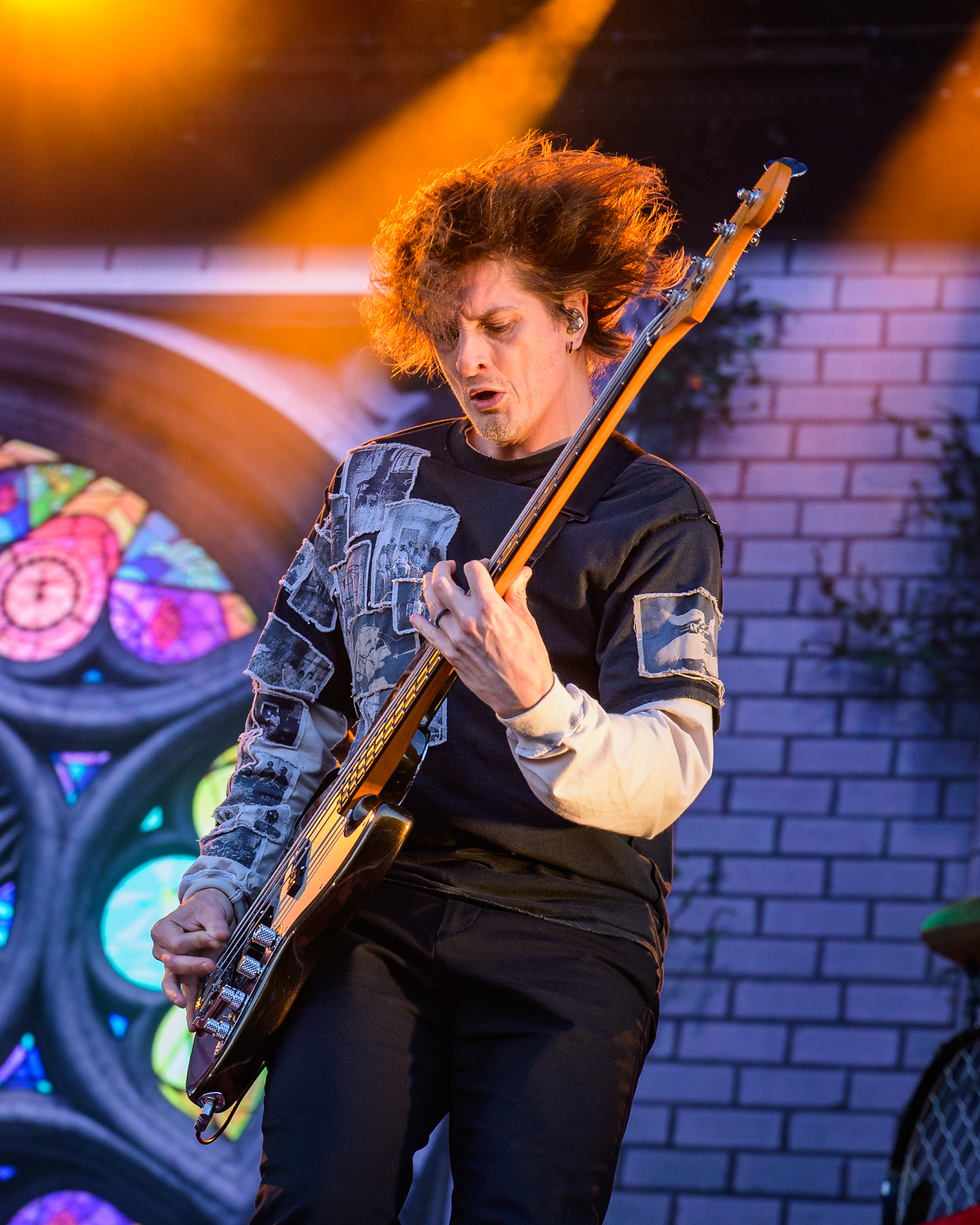
- Kean at Tons of Rock in 2026

Background information
- Born: Matthew Kean; 2 June 1986 (age 40); Sheffield, South Yorkshire, England
- Genres: Metalcore; alternative metal; alternative rock; pop rock; electronic rock; deathcore (early)
- Occupation: Musician
- Instrument: Bass guitar
- Years active: 2004–present
- Member of: Bring Me the Horizon

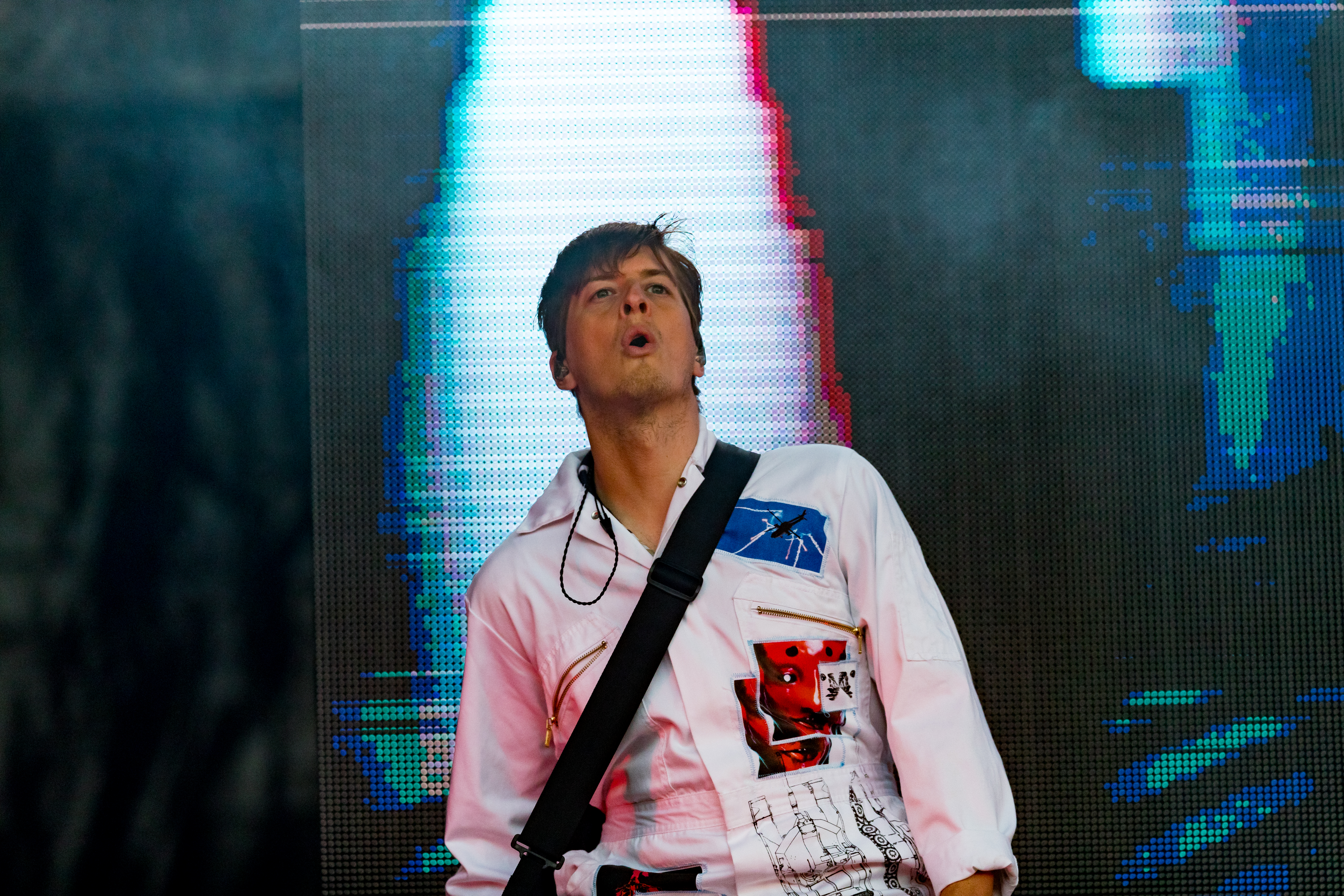
Kean in 2019

Matthew Kean (born 2 June 1986) is a British musician, best known as the bassist of the rock band Bring Me the Horizon. He has been credited on all seven of the band's studio releases.

== Early life ==
Kean was born on 2 June 1986 and was raised in Sheffield, South Yorkshire. Growing up, he wanted to be a footballer, but figured "that was never going to happen." He attended college to study A-levels in biology, physics, and chemistry.

Kean first picked up bass guitar in his college years out of boredom; on his days off, wondering what to do apart from playing on his computer, he decided to purchase a bass. Kean largely played along to songs from bands Blink-182 and Green Day, as well as "anything mainstream...I would go over and over those tabs."

Before joining Bring Me the Horizon, he would watch bandmate Lee Malia and former guitarist Curtis Ward perform in a Metallica tribute band. He ended up joining the band in 2004, after he finished college and leaving local bands he previously played for.

== Career ==
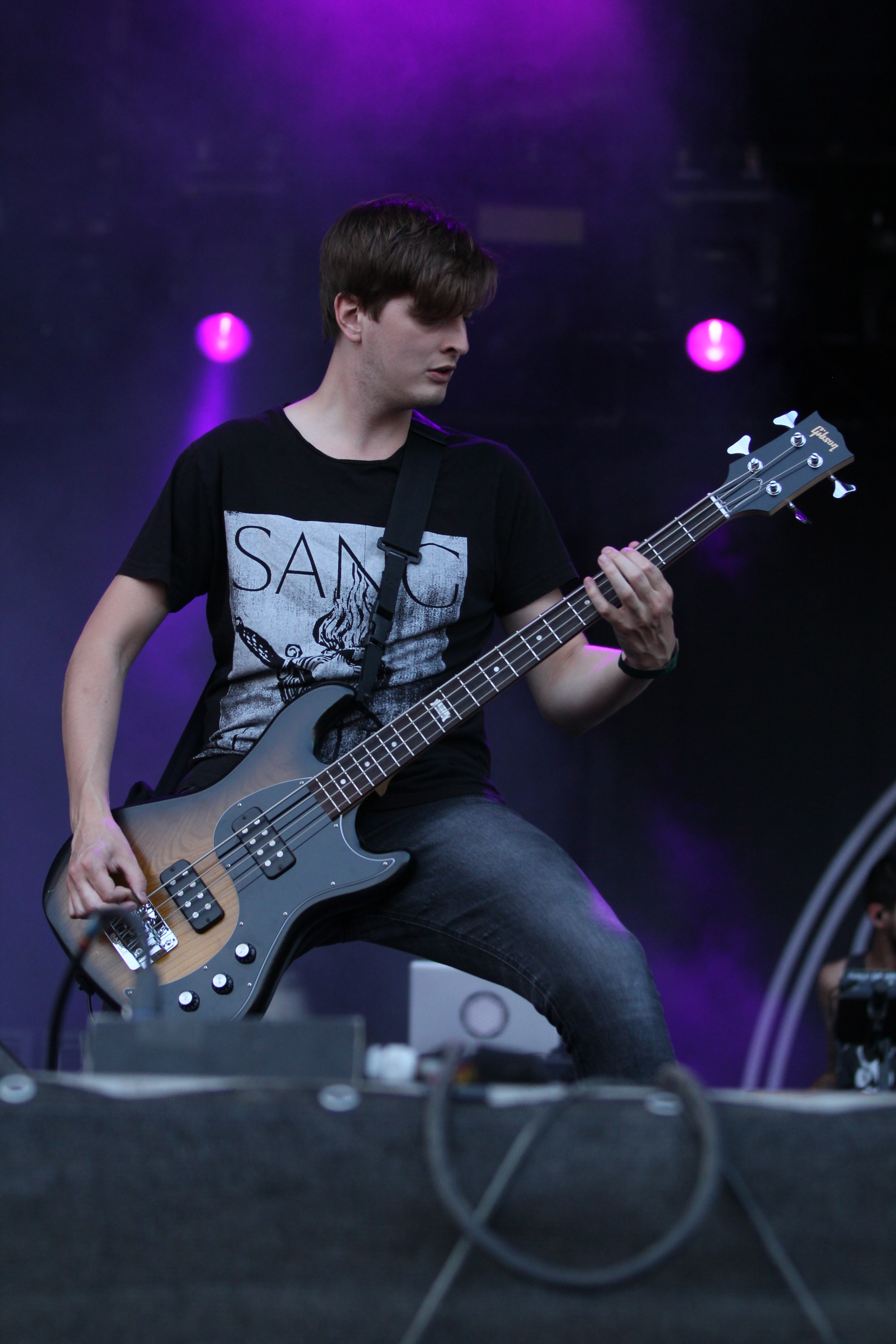
Kean performing in 2014

Bring Me the Horizon formed in 2004, and they released their debut EP, This Is What the Edge of Your Seat Was Made For, later that year. The group released their debut studio album Count Your Blessings, on 30 October 2006. The album peaked at number 93 on the UK Albums Chart. Their second studio album, Suicide Season was released on 29 September 2008. The album reached number 47 on the UK Albums Chart. Their third studio album, There Is a Hell Believe Me I've Seen It. There Is a Heaven Let's Keep It a Secret was released on 4 October 2010. The album debuted at number 13 on the UK Albums Chart. Their fourth studio album, Sempiternal was released on 1 April 2013. It peaked at number three on the UK Albums Chart. The group's fifth studio album, That's the Spirit was released on 11 September 2015. The album peaked at number two on the UK Albums Chart, as well as number two on the Billboard 200, making it the band's first top ten in the US. Their sixth studio album, Amo, was released on 25 January 2019. The album topped the UK Albums Chart. Their seventh studio album, Post Human: Nex Gen was released on 24 May 2024.

Kean, along with Oli Sykes' mother Carol Sykes, also served as the de facto managers of the band during the group's early years until 2008. On 12 December 2016, Kean was selected for the front cover on the 138th edition of Bass Guitar magazine, featuring an exclusive interview with the bassist.

== Equipment ==
The first bass guitar Kean owned was a Peavey starter pack. He later bought an Ibanez bass and used it on tour during the band's early years. Additionally, Kean owns a few Fenders and Sandbergs, as well as an endorsement through Gibson. The brand suggested him try their EB14, which he "immediately liked" because of its sound. On tour, Kean uses four basses including the EB. He also has a blue non-reverse Gibson Thunderbird bass, which is based on a 1965 model. His amp setup consists of an 8x10' cabinet, an Ashdown head and an Ampeg SVT-VR reissue. Kean also uses an EMG Ja Set Pickups. He uses an Ernie Ball Hybrid Coated bass strings with an individual 135. Kean generally does not use effects while playing, preferring to "keep it simple"; however, he has a Tube Screamer pedal and used a plugin from SansAmp on recording "What You Need" from the band's fifth studio album, That's the Spirit. He also used an Empress compressor effects pedal on the song "Oh No".

== Musical style and technique ==
Kean never took bass lessons nor learned music theory, and is entirely self-taught. He has remarked that he was "far behind" in his technique compared to the other Bring Me the Horizon members when the band first formed. On writing bass lines, Kean usually follows along with Malia's guitar parts.

Kean has stated that has no specific influences on bass, but that he was simply interested in music; however, he has expressed appreciation toward bassists such as Billy Sheehan and Matt Freeman of Rancid, as well as Cliff Burton and Jason Newsted of Metallica.

== Personal life ==
Kean is a vegan. He moved to Manchester in his early 20s. During the recording of Sempiternal, Kean lived with former bandmate Jona Weinhofen in a hotel as neither member had a place to stay.

Kean and American musician Tillie announced their engagement in June 2019. In November 2026, Tillie announced her pregnancy with their first child, a girl.

Kean is an avid football fan, and supports Premier League club Manchester City.

== Discography ==
=== Bring Me the Horizon ===
Studio albums

- Count Your Blessings (2006)
- Suicide Season (2008)
- There Is a Hell Believe Me I've Seen It. There Is a Heaven Let's Keep It a Secret. (2010)
- Sempiternal (2013)
- That's the Spirit (2015)
- Amo (2019)
- Post Human: Nex Gen (2024)
