= Architects discography =

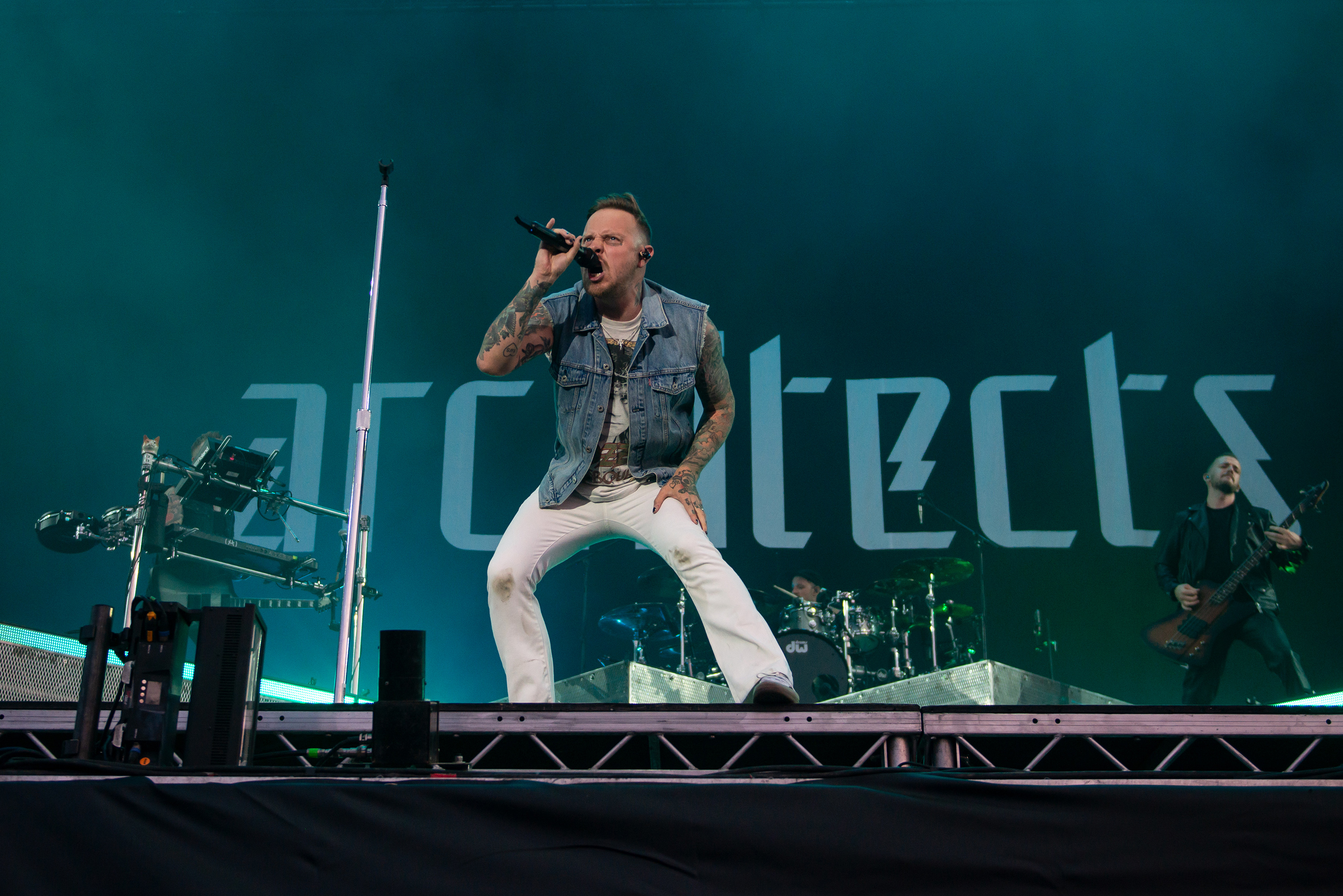
- Architects performing at Hellfest in 2023.
- Studio albums: 11
- Live albums: 2
- Singles: 34
- Video albums: 1
- Music videos: 41
- Split EPs: 1
- Demo albums: 1

The discography of Architects, an English metalcore band, consists of eleven studio albums, one split EP, two live albums, one video album, one demo album, thirty-four singles and 41 music videos. Formed in Brighton in 2004, the group originally consisted of vocalist Matt Johnson, guitarists Tom Searle and Tim Hillier-Brook, bassist Tim Lucas and drummer Dan Searle, who released the band's debut album Nightmares in 2006. In 2007, Johnson was replaced by Sam Carter and Lucas was replaced by Ali Dean, and the band released its second album Ruin. Hollow Crown followed on Century Media Records in 2009, which was the band's first album to register on the UK Albums Chart, reaching number 117. The band released The Here and Now in January 2011, which reached number 57 on the UK Albums Chart and topped the UK Rock & Metal Albums Chart.

Dean briefly left Architects shortly after the release of The Here and Now, but returned a few months later. The band's fifth album Daybreaker was released in 2012, reaching number 42 on the UK Albums Chart and topping the UK Rock & Metal Albums Chart. Hillier-Brook left the band shortly before the release of Daybreaker, with Sylosis frontman Josh Middleton temporarily taking his place. After signing with Epitaph Records, the band issued Lost Forever // Lost Together in 2014, which reached the UK top 20 and charted on the US Billboard 200 for the first time in the band's career, reaching number 125. Later in the year, Adam Christianson joined as the latest in a line of touring guitarists (he previously had a brief stint in 2012), before he would later become an official member of the band in 2015.

In May 2016, Architects released their seventh album All Our Gods Have Abandoned Us. The album reached number 15 in the UK, the top ten in Australia and Germany, and number 109 in the US. The album was the band's last to feature guitarist Tom Searle, who died from cancer on 20 August 2016. Searle's brother Dan, the band's drummer, admitted that "I don't know what will become of Architects", casting doubt on the future of the band. The band announced that they were working on new material in August 2017, and a week later released their first song since Searle's death, "Doomsday". Holy Hell was released on 9 November 2018. Their ninth studio album, For Those That Wish to Exist, was released on 26 February 2021. Its follow-up and the tenth studio album, The Classic Symptoms of a Broken Spirit, was released on 21 October 2022. Their eleventh studio album, The Sky, the Earth & All Between, was released on 28 February 2025.

== Albums ==
=== Studio albums ===
List of studio albums, with selected chart positions and sales figures
Title	Album details	Peak chart positions										Sales
Title	Album details	UK	AUS	AUT	BEL (FL)	CAN	GER	NZ	SCO	SWI	US	Sales
Nightmares	Released: 15 May 2006; Label: In at the Deep End, Distort; Format: CD	—	—	—	—	—	—	—	—	—	—	
Ruin	Released: 25 October 2007; Label: United by Fate, Distort, Century Media; Format: CD	— (Note: Ruin did not enter the UK Albums Chart, but peaked at number 36 on the UK Independent Albums Chart.)	—	—	—	—	—	—	—	—	—	
Hollow Crown	Released: 26 January 2009; Label: United by Fate, Distort, Century Media; Formats: CD, DL	117	—	—	—	—	—	—	—	—	—	
The Here and Now	Released: 19 January 2011; Label: Century Media; Formats: CD, DL	57	—	—	—	—	—	—	63	—	— (Note: The Here and Now did not enter the US Billboard 200, but peaked at number 47 on the US Heatseekers Albums chart.)	
Daybreaker	Released: 28 May 2012; Label: Century Media, Zestone; Formats: CD, DL	42	—	—	182	—	93	—	53	—	— (Note: Daybreaker did not enter the US Billboard 200, but peaked at number 28 on the US Heatseekers Albums chart.)	
Lost Forever // Lost Together	Released: 11 March 2014; Label: Epitaph, UNFD, New Damage; Formats: CD, LP, DL	16	13	30	111	—	36	—	25	—	125	
All Our Gods Have Abandoned Us	Released: 27 May 2016; Label: Epitaph, UNFD; Formats: CD, LP, DL	15	2	17	40	83	8	25	14	27	109	UK: 28,878
Holy Hell	Released: 9 November 2018; Label: Epitaph, UNFD; Formats: CD, LP, DL	18	8	13	34	72	7	—	17	17	89	
For Those That Wish to Exist	Released: 26 February 2021; Label: Epitaph; Formats: CD, LP, DL	1	1	5	16	57	3	—	3	7	80	UK: 12,542
The Classic Symptoms of a Broken Spirit	Released: 21 October 2022; Label: Epitaph; Formats: CD, LP, DL	18	8	24	70	—	12	—	11	17	— (Note: The Classic Symptoms of a Broken Spirit did not enter the US Billboard 200, but peaked at number 38 on the US Top Album Sales chart.)	UK 4,017
The Sky, the Earth & All Between	Released: 28 February 2025; Label: Epitaph; Formats: CD, LP, DL	2	8	5	24	—	3	40	7	9	152	UK: 17,615; US: 90,000
"—" denotes a release that did not chart or was not issued in that region.

=== Live albums ===
List of live albums, with selected chart positions
Title	Album details	Peak chart positions						
Title	Album details	UK	UK Indie	UK Rock	SCO	GER	SWI	US Top Sales
Live at the Royal Albert Hall	Released: 15 February 2022; Label: Epitaph; Formats: 2×LP	65	7	3	8	—	—	—
For Those That Wish to Exist at Abbey Road	Released: 25 March 2022; Label: Epitaph; Formats: CD, DL	— (Note: For Those That Wish to Exist at Abbey Road did not enter the UK Albums Chart, but peaked at number 31 on the UK Albums Sales Chart.)	15	6	31	10	45	87
"—" denotes a release that did not chart or was not issued in that region.

=== Video albums ===
List of video albums
Title	Album details
One Hundred Days	Released: 1 October 2013; Label: Get Deluxe; Formats: DVD, Blu-ray

=== Demo albums ===
List of demo albums
Title	Album details
2005 Demo	Released: 2005; Label: None (self-released); Format: CD

== Split EPs ==
List of split EPs
Title	EP details
Architects & Dead Swans (split with Dead Swans)	Released: 25 February 2008; Label: Thirty Days of Night; Format: 7" vinyl

== Singles ==
List of singles as lead artist, with selected chart positions, showing year released and album name
Title	Year	Peak chart positions								Certifications	Album
Title	Year	UK Sales	UK Down.	UK Indie	UK Rock	US Rock Air.	US Main.	US Rock	US Hard Rock	Certifications	Album
"Day in Day Out"	2010	—	—	41	17	—	—	—	—		The Here and Now
"Learn to Live"	2011	—	—	—	—	—	—	—	—		The Here and Now
"Heartburn"	2011	—	—	—	—	—	—	—	—		The Here and Now
"Devil's Island"	2011	—	—	—	8	—	—	—	—		Daybreaker
"These Colours Don't Run" (featuring Jon Green)	2012	—	—	—	—	—	—	—	—		Daybreaker
"Alpha Omega"	2012	—	—	—	—	—	—	—	—		Daybreaker
"Black Blood"	2013	—	—	—	—	—	—	—	—		Daybreaker
"Naysayer"	2014	—	—	26	3	—	—	—	—		Lost Forever // Lost Together
"Broken Cross"	2014	—	—	—	—	—	—	—	—		Lost Forever // Lost Together
"Colony Collapse"	2014	—	—	—	—	—	—	—	—		Lost Forever // Lost Together
"A Match Made in Heaven"	2016	—	—	—	—	—	—	—	—		All Our Gods Have Abandoned Us
"Gone with the Wind"	2016	—	—	—	—	—	—	—	—		All Our Gods Have Abandoned Us
"Downfall"	2016	—	—	—	—	—	—	—	—		All Our Gods Have Abandoned Us
"Phantom Fear"	2016	—	—	—	—	—	—	—	—		All Our Gods Have Abandoned Us
"Gravity"	2017	—	—	—	—	—	—	—	—		All Our Gods Have Abandoned Us
"Doomsday"	2017	—	—	—	17	—	—	—	—		Holy Hell
"Hereafter"	2018	—	—	—	25	—	—	—	—		Holy Hell
"Royal Beggars"	2018	—	—	—	—	—	—	—	—		Holy Hell
"Modern Misery"	2018	—	—	—	—	—	—	—	—		Holy Hell
"Animals"	2020	76	72	—	19	24	5	42	3	BPI: Silver; RIAA: Gold	For Those That Wish to Exist
"Black Lungs"	2020	—	—	—	—	—	—	—	—		For Those That Wish to Exist
"Dead Butterflies"	2021	—	—	—	—	—	18	—	21		For Those That Wish to Exist
"Meteor"	2021	—	—	—	—	—	—	—	—		For Those That Wish to Exist
"When We Were Young"	2022	93	92	—	—	—	20	—	— (Note: "When We Were Young" did not enter the US Hot Hard Rock Songs chart, but peaked at number 25 on the US Hard Rock Digital Song Sales chart.)		The Classic Symptoms of a Broken Spirit
"Tear Gas"	2022	—	—	—	—	—	28	—	—		The Classic Symptoms of a Broken Spirit
"Deep Fake"	2022	—	—	—	—	—	—	—	—		The Classic Symptoms of a Broken Spirit
"A New Moral Low Ground"	2022	—	—	—	—	—	—	—	—		The Classic Symptoms of a Broken Spirit
"Seeing Red"	2023	97	82	—	—	—	—	—	9		The Sky, the Earth & All Between
"Curse"	2024	94	90	—	—	—	—	—	19		The Sky, the Earth & All Between
"Whiplash"	2024	—	—	—	—	—	—	—	18		The Sky, the Earth & All Between
"Blackhole"	2025	—	—	—	—	—	—	—	7		The Sky, the Earth & All Between
"Everything Ends"	2025	—	—	—	—	16	1	—	16		The Sky, the Earth & All Between
"Brain Dead" (featuring House of Protection)	2025	—	—	—	—	—	—	—	20		The Sky, the Earth & All Between
"Broken Mirror"	2026	—	—	—	—	11	1	—	6		The Sky, the Earth & All Between
"Machine"	2026	—	—	—	—	—	15	—	15		TBA
"—" denotes a release that did not chart or was not issued in that region.

== Other charted songs ==
List of other charted songs, showing year released and album name
Title	Year	Peak chart positions			Album
Title	Year	UK Rock	US Rock	US Hard Rock	Album
"Untitled II"	2014	15	—	—	Lost Forever // Lost Together
"Death Is Not Defeat"	2018	31	—	—	Holy Hell
"Holy Hell"	2018	40	40	—	Holy Hell
"Impermanence" (featuring Winston McCall)	2021	—	—	25	For Those That Wish to Exist
"Elegy"	2025	—	—	19	The Sky, the Earth & All Between
"—" denotes a release that did not chart or was not issued in that region.

== Music videos ==
List of music videos, showing year released and directors names
Title	Year	Director(s)	Ref.
"In the Desert"	2006	Unknown	
"Always"	2008	Adam Powell	
"You'll Find Safety"	2008	Salvatore Perrone	
"Buried at Sea"	2008	Adam Powell	
"Early Grave"	2008	Adam Powell	
"Follow the Water"	2009	Stuart Birchall	
"We're All Alone"	2009	Unknown	
"Day in Day Out"	2010	Stuart Birchall	
"Learn to Live"	2011	Stuart Birchall	
"Heartburn"	2011	Stuart Birchall	
"Delete, Rewind"	2011	Various (live clips)	
"Devil's Island"	2011	Unknown	
"Alpha Omega"	2012	Stuart Birchall	
"These Colours Don't Run"	2012	Stuart Birchall	
"Even If You Win, You're Still a Rat"	2012	Unknown	
"Black Blood"	2013	Red Boss Productions	
"Naysayer"	2014	Carlo Opperman	
"Broken Cross"	2014	James Unwin	
"Gravedigger"	2014	Tom Welsh	
"A Match Made in Heaven"	2016	Stuart Birchall	
"Gone with the Wind"	2016	Jeb Hardwick	
"Downfall"	2016	Jeb Hardwick	
"Gravity"	2017	Lucas Englund	
"Doomsday"	2017	Stuart Birchall	
"Hereafter"	2018	Jeb Hardwick	
"Royal Beggars"	2018	Lewis Cater	
"Modern Misery"	2018	Lewis Cater	
"Death Is Not Defeat"	2018	Jeb Hardwick	
"Animals"	2020	Dan Searle	
"Black Lungs"	2020	Jeb Hardwick	
"Dead Butterflies"	2021	Tom Welsh & Taylor Fawcett	
"Meteor"	2021	Jeb Hardwick	
"When We Were Young"	2022	Dan Searle	
"Tear Gas"	2022	Dan Searle	
"Deep Fake"	2022	Jeb Hardwick	
"A New Moral Low Ground"	2022	Jeb Hardwick	
"Seeing Red"	2023	Dan Searle	
"Whiplash"	2024	Spencer Berlin	
"Blackhole"	2025	Jensen Noen	
"Brain Dead"	2025	Architects, House of Protection & Kevin Garcia	
"Broken Mirror"	2026	Jensen Noen	
"Machine"	2026	Jensen Noen	
