= Live at the Royal Albert Hall (Architects album) =

Live album by Architects
- Released: February 15, 2022
- Recorded: November 21, 2020
- Venue: Royal Albert Hall (London, United Kingdom)
- Genre: Metalcore
- Length: 68:27
- Label: Epitaph
- Producer: Tom Welsh

Architects chronology
For Those That Wish to Exist (2021)	Live at the Royal Albert Hall (2022)	For Those That Wish to Exist at Abbey Road (2022)

Live at the Royal Albert Hall is the first live album by English metalcore band Architects. Recorded at the band's inaugural show at the Royal Albert Hall on 21 November 2020, it was produced by Tom Welsh and was released on 15 February 2022 via Epitaph Records.

== Track listing ==
All lyrics are written by Architects; all music is composed by Architects.

Live at the Royal Albert Hall track listing
No.	Title	Original album	Length
1.	"Nihilist"	All Our Gods Have Abandoned Us	4:21
2.	"Modern Misery"	Holy Hell	4:26
3.	"Discourse is Dead"	For Those That Wish to Exist	3:41
4.	"Broken Cross"	Lost Forever // Lost Together	3:54
5.	"Death Is Not Defeat"	Holy Hell	3:41
6.	"Royal Beggars"	Holy Hell	4:16
7.	"Gone With The Wind"	All Our Gods Have Abandoned Us	3:42
8.	"Mortal After All"	Holy Hell	3:48
9.	"Gravedigger"	Lost Forever // Lost Together	3:55
10.	"Animals"	For Those That Wish to Exist	4:01
11.	"Holy Hell"	Holy Hell	4:19
12.	"Dead Butterflies"	For Those That Wish to Exist	5:00
13.	"Memento Mori"	All Our Gods Have Abandoned Us	2:01
14.	"A Wasted Hymn"	Holy Hell	4:04
15.	"A Match Made In Heaven"	All Our Gods Have Abandoned Us	3:46
16.	"Hereafter"	Holy Hell	4:28
17.	"Doomsday"	Holy Hell	4:48
Total length:			66:27

== Personnel ==
Architects

- Sam Carter – lead vocals
- Josh Middleton – lead guitar, keyboards, backing vocals
- Adam Christianson – rhythm guitar, backing vocals
- Alex "Ali" Dean – bass, keyboards, drum pad
- Dan Searle – drums, percussion, programming, keyboards

== Charts ==
Chart performance for Live at the Royal Albert Hall
Chart (2022)	Peak position
Scottish Albums (OCC)	8
UK Albums (OCC)	65
UK Rock & Metal Albums (OCC)	3
