= The Classic Symptoms of a Broken Spirit =

Studio album by Architects
- Released: 21 October 2022
- Recorded: 2021–2022
- Genre: Alternative metal; industrial metal; metalcore
- Length: 42:24
- Label: Epitaph
- Producer: Dan Searle; Josh Middleton

Architects chronology
| For Those That Wish to Exist at Abbey Road (2022) | The Classic Symptoms of a Broken Spirit (2022) | The Sky, the Earth & All Between (2025) |

Architects studio album chronology
| For Those That Wish to Exist (2021) | The Classic Symptoms of a Broken Spirit (2022) | The Sky, the Earth & All Between (2025) |

Singles from The Classic Symptoms of a Broken Spirit
- 1. "When We Were Young" Released: 20 April 2022; 2. "Tear Gas" Released: 12 July 2022; 3. "Deep Fake" Released: 30 August 2022; 4. "A New Moral Low Ground" Released: 11 October 2022

The Classic Symptoms of a Broken Spirit (stylised in lowercase) is the tenth studio album by English metalcore band Architects. It was released on 21 October 2022 through Epitaph Records. The album was produced by Dan Searle and Josh Middleton. This is the last album to feature lead guitarist Josh Middleton before his departure from the band in May 2023.

== Background and promotion ==
On 20 April 2022, the band released the brand new single "When We Were Young" along with an accompanying music video. The song premiered on BBC Radio 1's Future Sounds with Clara Amfo, along with an interview with Sam Carter afterwards. On 12 July, Architects unveiled the single "Tear Gas" and its corresponding music video. At the same time, they unexpectedly announced the album itself, the album cover, the track list, and release date. On 30 August, the single "Deep Fake" was released. On 11 October, one week before the album release, the band released the fourth and final single "A New Moral Low Ground" along with a music video.

== Critical reception ==
Professional ratings
Aggregate scores
| Source | Rating |
|---|---|
| AnyDecentMusic? | 7.3/10 |
| Metacritic | 77/100 |
Review scores
| Source | Rating |
| The Arts Desk | 4/5 stars |
| Clash | 7/10 |
| Classic Rock | 3.5/5 stars |
| Distorted Sound | 6/10 |
| DIY | 4/5 stars |
| Kerrang! | 4/5 stars |
| The Line of Best Fit | 7/10 |
| Metal Hammer | 3.5/5 stars |
| NME | 4/5 stars |
| Sputnikmusic | 3/5 |

The Classic Symptoms of a Broken Spirit received generally positive reviews from critics. At Metacritic, which assigns a normalized rating out of 100 to reviews from mainstream critics, the album has an average score of 77 out of 100, which indicates "generally favorable reviews" based on 7 reviews. Clash was positive towards the release stating, "Overall, Architects have yet again served up something sharp and evolutionary. While it at times may feel less refined and grand than previous work, the push for new sounds is definitely an exciting change. This is a punchy record sure to spark some vital debates, as well as having a solid slew of crowd-pleasers." Distorted Sound scored the album 6 out of 10 and said: "After the unbeaten success of their last album, Architects knew they had to deliver. Whether or not they did that is down to individual opinion. Whilst there is no denying the band's sheer talent, The Classic Symptoms of a Broken Spirit feels like a very average record overall. There are some musical highlights though, with tracks such as 'Deep Fake', 'Tear Gas' and 'When We Were Young' taking the limelight. The lyrical content is something to be admired too, providing us with some much needed relatability in these unpredictable modern times. It's definitely worth a listen, that's for sure." DIY was also positive towards the release, calling it "...a little unrelenting, but the sheer ferocity of this record illustrates a band intently focused on the future, and breaking through to the next level." Luke Morton of Kerrang! considered the release to be "...a ferocious, fearless record from one of Britain's best." Metal Hammer gave the album a positive review and stated: "This is not the most unique, original Architects album, and it's definitely not going to be considered their most 'worthy', but for all the credibility that some may feel the band have sacrificed, they've done something arguably even harder: they've shown they can write some absolutely shit-hot floor-fillers. Good for them."

Andy Price of NME was positive towards the release and stated that "Buoyed by the energy of getting back in the studio for in-the-flesh writing and recording, the Brighton five-piece's new array of songs make for a fiery and relentless dish. It's an album that solidly caps the canon of a band that has always quested to expand the language of 21st-century metalcore." Kyle Dimond of Rock Sins rated the album 7 out of 10 and said: "Whilst the last record dialled up the discourse, The Classic Symptoms of a Broken Spirit will really have you as a listener questioning what you want out of Architects. In the end, it falls a little short of what they accomplished last time around but does feel more sure of itself in terms of embarking down this road for the foreseeable future." Tom Carr of The Arts Desk stated that "Since 2018's Holy Hell there has been a slow progression in Architects' sound. The naysayers complain they're 'not heavy anymore'. Well here they return bearing sharpened fangs, riffs and intricate drum fills in hand. Though still more refined than their more intricate metalcore work. But the unfiltered sound hits like a heavyweight going for the knockout blow all the same. The UK metal scene is Architects' to make their own, and it's a sight to see." Emma Way of The Line of Best Fit stated that "This is a band still keen to experiment – a flourishing ensemble ahead of the alternative music curve. Architects' rivals might be hanging off their every word for the next instructions of what the future of metalcore looks like – and it just might be more controlled than what they initially expected." Wall of Sound gave the album almost a perfect score 9/10 and saying: "Even with the trickle of singles, I wasn't ready for this as a complete album. The Classic Symptoms of a Broken Spirit is just as angry and violent as any Architects album, while also continuing their quest to widen the audience and spread their message. It's simultaneously more catchy and more dense, which is a difficult feat to pull off like they do here. I can understand why some might not be happy with the shift in sound after the excellence of their previous album, but as its own thing, this is a killer record full of venomous tunes and thoughtful lyrics."

== Track listing ==
All lyrics are written by Dan Searle; all music is composed by Architects.

The Classic Symptoms of a Broken Spirit track listing
| No. | Title | Length |
|---|---|---|
| 1. | "Deep Fake" | 3:33 |
| 2. | "Tear Gas" | 4:17 |
| 3. | "Spit the Bone" | 3:32 |
| 4. | "Burn Down My House" | 4:19 |
| 5. | "Living Is Killing Us" | 3:41 |
| 6. | "When We Were Young" | 3:13 |
| 7. | "Doomscrolling" | 4:21 |
| 8. | "Born Again Pessimist" | 3:31 |
| 9. | "A New Moral Low Ground" | 3:31 |
| 10. | "All the Love in the World" | 4:01 |
| 11. | "Be Very Afraid" | 4:20 |
| Total length: | | 42:24 |

Notes

- All track titles are stylised in lowercase.

== Personnel ==
Credits adapted from album's liner notes.

Architects

- Sam Carter – lead vocals, percussion, additional production, composition
- Josh Middleton – guitars, keyboards, backing vocals, production, composition
- Adam Christianson – guitars, composition
- Alex "Ali" Dean – bass, keyboards, drum pad, composition
- Dan Searle – drums, percussion, programming, keyboards, production, engineering, composition

Additional musicians

- Kat Marsh – choir
- Elio Evangelou – choir
- Vicky Butterfield – choir
- Calvin Thomas – choir
- Jack Hamilton – choir
- Mike Osborne – choir

Additional personnel

- Peter Miles – additional production, drum and choir engineering
- Zakk Cervini – mixing
- Ted Jensen – mastering (Sterling Sound, Nashville, Tennessee)
- Jamie Finch – additional production (5)
- Nik Trekov – engineering, mixing assistant
- Justin Shturtz – mastering

== Charts ==
Chart performance for The Classic Symptoms of a Broken Spirit
| Chart (2022–23) | Peak position |
|---|---|
| Australian Albums (ARIA) | 8 |
| Austrian Albums (Ö3 Austria) | 24 |
| Belgian Albums (Ultratop Flanders) | 70 |
| Belgian Albums (Ultratop Wallonia) | 200 |
| German Albums (Offizielle Top 100) | 12 |
| Scottish Albums (OCC) | 11 |
| Swiss Albums (Schweizer Hitparade) | 17 |
| UK Albums (OCC) | 18 |
| UK Independent Albums (OCC) | 4 |
| UK Rock & Metal Albums (OCC) | 1 |
| US Top Album Sales (Billboard) | 38 |
| US Top Current Album Sales (Billboard) | 31 |
| US Top Hard Rock Albums (Billboard) | 24 |
