= Live at the Royal Albert Hall =

Live at the Royal Albert Hall may refer to any of these live albums recorded at the Royal Albert Hall:

- At the Albert Hall, a 1975 live album by Nana Mouskouri, later reissued as At the Royal Albert Hall
- At the Royal Albert Hall, a 2019 live album by Camel
- Hall of Fame (The Moody Blues album), a 2000 live album recorded at the Royal Albert Hall
- In Concert with The London Symphony Orchestra, a 2000 live album and video recorded by Deep Purple with the London Symphony Orchestra at the Royal Albert Hall
- Live at the Royal Albert Hall (Adele album), a 2011 live album
- Live at the Royal Albert Hall (featuring The Parallax Orchestra), a 2018 live album by Alter Bridge
- Live at the Royal Albert Hall (Architects album), a 2022 live album
- Live at the Royal Albert Hall (Arctic Monkeys album), a 2020 live album
- Live at the Royal Albert Hall (Beth Hart video), a 2018 concert video and live album
- Live at the Royal Albert Hall, a 2001 live video by Bond
- Live at the Royal Albert Hall (Bring Me the Horizon album), a 2016 live album
- Live at Royal Albert Hall 1971, a live album by the Byrds
- Live at the Royal Albert Hall (The Cinematic Orchestra album), a 2008 live album
- Live at the Royal Albert Hall, a 2013 live album by David Bisbal
- Live at the Albert Hall, a 1968 live album by The Dubliners
- Live at the Royal Albert Hall, a 2005 live album of a 1979 concert by Dusty Springfield
- Live at Royal Albert Hall (Eels album), a 2015 live album and video
- Live at the Royal Albert Hall (Emeli Sandé album), a 2013 live album
- Live at the Royal Albert Hall (Emerson, Lake and Palmer album), a 1993 live album
- Live at the Royal Albert Hall (Erasure album), a 2007 live album and a 2008 live video
- Live at the Royal Albert Hall (Joan Armatrading album), a 2011 live album
- Live at the Royal Albert Hall (Ladysmith Black Mambazo album), a 1999 live album
- Live at the Royal Albert Hall (The New Seekers album), a 1972 live album
- Live at the Royal Albert Hall (Nick Cave and The Bad Seeds album), a 2008 live album
- Live at the Royal Albert Hall (Paul Weller album), a 2008 live album
- Live at the Royal Albert Hall (Show of Hands album), a 1996 live album
- Live at the Royal Albert Hall (Snarky Puppy album), 2020
- Live at the Royal Albert Hall, The Red Hot Tour, a 1995 live video by Vanessa-Mae
- Live at the Royal Albert Hall (The Who album), a 2003 live album
- Live at Royal Albert Hall (Yanni video)
- Live from the Royal Albert Hall, a 2009 live album by the Killers
- Live from the Royal Albert Hall (Joe Bonamassa album), a 2009 live album
- Royal Albert Hall October 10 1997, a 1998 live album by Spiritualized
- Slowhand at 70 – Live at the Royal Albert Hall, a 2015 live album by Eric Clapton

== See also ==
- The Bootleg Series Vol. 4: Bob Dylan Live 1966, The "Royal Albert Hall" Concert, a 1998 live album widely referred to as a Royal Albert Hall recording, but was recorded at the Manchester Free Trade Hall
