= Whitemare =

English rock band

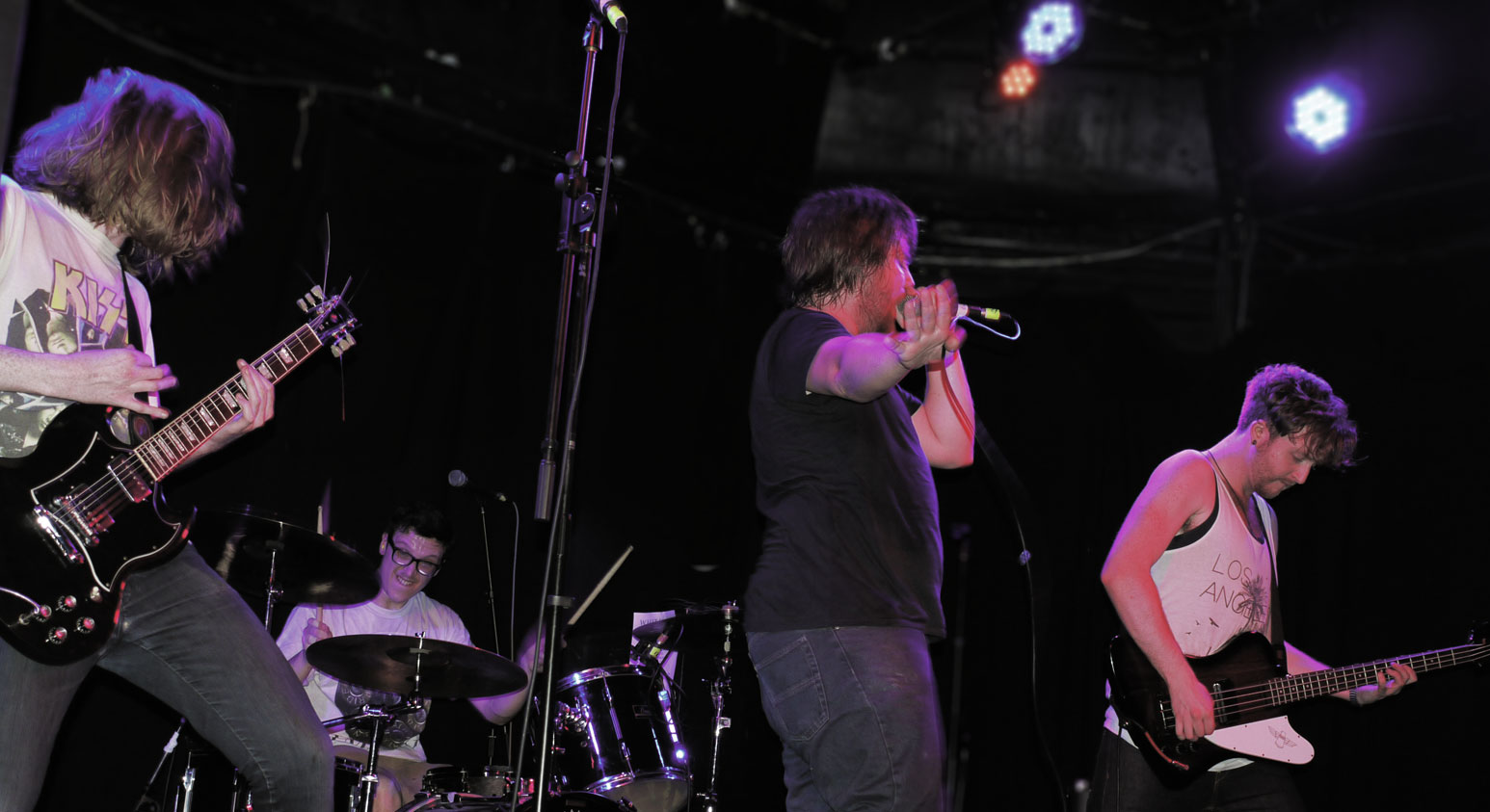
- Whitemare live in 2011. From left to right: Al Kilcullen, Eugene Economou, Matt Johnson and Lewis Porter.

Background information
- Origin: Brighton, England
- Genres: Speed metal, Southern rock, hardcore punk, blues rock, stoner rock, rock and roll
- Years active: 2008–2016
- Labels: Riot House Records, BlackDream Records, Small Town Records
- Past members: Matt Johnson; Al Kilcullen; Eugene Economou; Lewis Porter; Tim Hillier-Brook; Adam 'Burns' Hall; Tristan Macfie; Robin Urbino
- Website: www.facebook.com/whitemareuk

Whitemare was an English rock band from Brighton, formed in 2008. The group's line-up featured ex-Architects vocalist Matt Johnson, ex-Johnny Truant guitarist Al Kilcullen and ex-Centurion drummer Eugene Economou. In 2009, Whitemare recorded a five track EP which was released through Small Town Records, with the band's style being described as a cross between hardcore punk, stoner rock and Southern rock. Whitemare then released their first album, Snider, worldwide on 11 November 2011. The band have been inactive on social media since 2015 and stated "Whitemare has been over for a minute now" in 2023.

== History ==
=== Early line-up ===
At its inception, the band's lineup included Architects guitarist Tim Hillier-Brook on Bass and Adam 'Burns' Hall on second guitar. However, after a short amount of time Tim Hillier-Brook departed Whitemare to focus on the increasing success of Architects, and the band also decided the music would be better suited to a single guitarist rather than two. Subsequent bassists have included Tristen Macfie, Robin Urbino, and the current bassist Lewis Porter as of November 2010.

=== Snider (2011) ===
Whitemare released their debut album, Snider, on 11 November 2011. It was recorded over the course of two days with Gez Walton (ex-The Ghost of a Thousand) mixing and producing. The album received an almost unanimously positive reaction from the UK rock media, being hailed as a promising debut.

== Discography ==
Date of Release	Title	Label
2010	Whitemare (EP)	Small Town Records
2011	Snider	BlackDream Records
2013	Screamer (EP)	BlackDream Records
