= Hollow Crown =

Studio album by Architects
- Released: 26 January 2009
- Recorded: July 2008
- Studio: Outhouse Studios, Reading, Berkshire, UK
- Genre: Metalcore; mathcore
- Length: 41:10
- Label: United by Fate; Distort; Century Media
- Producer: John Mitchell; Ben Humphreys

Architects studio album chronology
| Ruin (2007) | Hollow Crown (2009) | The Here and Now (2011) |

Hollow Crown is the third studio album by English metalcore band Architects. It was recorded at Outhouse Studios, Reading. On their YouTube channel, there are several videos documenting the band's recording sessions. The album was leaked on the internet on 12 January 2009. It was officially released on 26 January 2009 through United by Fate, Distort and Century Media Records. The album was produced by John Mitchell and Ben Humphreys. Kerrang! magazine gave it their maximum rating.

== Background and recording ==
The vocals for the album were recorded in 14 hours. On 18 July 2010, it was announced from the band's Facebook account that they would be re-releasing Hollow Crown (in the UK only) as a deluxe edition on 16 August 2010. The deluxe edition was to include a DVD documentary on their previous 18 months of touring/ recording and a remix of the title track "Hollow Crown" by the guitarist and drummer Tom and Dan Searle.

== Composition ==
=== Style and theme ===
This album marks a change in guitar tuning for the second time, now using C# standard on a majority of the tracks (drop B tuning being used on Ruin) and an alternate tuning similar to C# standard, but with the low C# tuned to G#. This tuning is featured on the tracks "Early Grave" and "Borrowed Time". Also, they use a 7 string baritone (ESP LTD SC-607B Stephen Carpenter Signature) on the track "Dead March", which is tuned to drop A.

Stylistically, the band considered Hollow Crown as a natural progression from its predecessor. Hollow Crown album displays a significant increase in clean vocals from Sam Carter, as well as a change in his harsh vocals, from the lower register on Ruin to more high-pitched screams. Also in this album, there is a further departure from the band's mathcore roots, utilising more traditional song structures, simplified riffs and more melodic musicianship, as well as a fair usage of keyboards and drum programming.

Carter has stated that the lyrics on the album are of a personal nature. He has said that he wrote about everyday life and things that happen to him, these are as simple as sitting in a car with friends or hating girls.

The album title has had different value to each member of the band. Dan Searle in interview was asked why the band gave it the title and he stated to him it refers to "those people you meet in life that earn nothing, but are given everything." During an interview in October 2009, vocalist and lyricist Sam Carter stated that the inspiration for him when picking the name was because despite the band's hard working nature they never seemed to progress, saying "we've always felt like we were a band that worked really, really hard and we never got appreciation for it".

== Critical reception ==
Professional ratings
Review scores
| Source | Rating |
|---|---|
| AbsolutePunk | (83%) |
| AllMusic | 3/5 stars |
| AltSounds | 89% |
| Alter The Press! | 4/5 stars |
| Exclaim! | (favourable) |
| Kerrang! | 5/5 stars |
| Rock Sound | 8/10 |
| Sputnikmusic | 3.5/5 |

The album was well received by critics. Kerrang! magazine described it as a "carefully layered and brilliantly crafted [record]".

In 2012, British publication Rock Sound added Architects' album Hollow Crown into their 101 Modern Classics placed at number 76. They considered the album more of a classic than The Offspring's Americana and Bullet for My Valentine's The Poison. Stating that "back when they were young, hungry and out to impress, Architects wrote this face-melting collection of rippers and made the world sit up."

When Sam Carter was asked in 2018 whether the band would re-visit the album in full in-line for its ten-year anniversary he was dismissive, saying "I don't see us as that band. Also it would never be the original line-up, it would never be what it was. I love Hollow Crown because I was a really angry 18 year old that didn't know how to look after his voice. And that was part of the charm to it."

== Track listing ==
All lyrics are written by Sam Carter; all music is composed by Architects.

| No. | Title | Length |
|---|---|---|
| 1. | "Early Grave" | 3:32 |
| 2. | "Dethroned" | 3:06 |
| 3. | "Numbers Count for Nothing" | 3:50 |
| 4. | "Follow the Water" | 3:40 |
| 5. | "In Elegance" | 4:16 |
| 6. | "We're All Alone" | 3:01 |
| 7. | "Borrowed Time" | 2:30 |
| 8. | "Every Last Breath" | 3:28 |
| 9. | "One of These Days" | 2:34 |
| 10. | "Dead March" | 3:47 |
| 11. | "Left with a Last Minute" | 2:57 |
| 12. | "Hollow Crown" | 4:24 |
| Total length: | | 41:10 |

Bonus track
| No. | Title | Length |
|---|---|---|
| 13. | "To the Death" (2008 re-recording; original version from Nightmares) | 2:38 |

== Personnel ==
Architects

- Sam Carter – lead vocals
- Tom Searle – lead guitar, keyboards, programming
- Tim Hillier-Brook – rhythm guitar
- Alex "Ali" Dean – bass
- Dan Searle – drums, percussion, programming

Additional personnel

- John Mitchell – production, engineering, mixing
- Ben Humphreys – production, engineering
- Matt O'Grady – engineering
- Alan Douches – mastering
- Leander Gloversmith – management
- Janalea Hoffman and George Vallee – publicity
- Melanie Schmidt and Ray Harkins – A&R
- Empty Design – artwork

== Charts ==
| Chart (2009) | Peak position |
|---|---|
| UK Albums (OCC) | 117 |
| UK Rock & Metal Albums (OCC) | 5 |
