= For Those That Wish to Exist =

Studio album by Architects
- Released: 26 February 2021
- Recorded: 2019–2020
- Studios: Brighton Electric, Brighton, East Sussex; Middle Farm Studios, Newton Abbot, Devon
- Genres: Alternative metal; metalcore
- Length: 58:21
- Label: Epitaph
- Producers: Dan Searle; Josh Middleton

Architects chronology
Holy Hell (2018)	For Those That Wish to Exist (2021)	Live at the Royal Albert Hall (2022)

Architects studio album chronology
Holy Hell (2018)	For Those That Wish to Exist (2021)	The Classic Symptoms of a Broken Spirit (2022)

Singles from For Those That Wish to Exist
- 1. "Animals" Released: 20 October 2020; 2. "Black Lungs" Released: 2 December 2020; 3. "Dead Butterflies" Released: 20 January 2021; 4. "Meteor" Released: 8 February 2021

For Those That Wish to Exist is the ninth studio album by English metalcore band Architects. It was released on 26 February 2021 through Epitaph Records. The album was produced by Dan Searle and Josh Middleton.

== Composition ==
=== Style and themes ===
The genres of the album has been described as metalcore and alternative metal, while exploring elements of other genres such as industrial metal, electronic, orchestral, post-rock, and EDM. Specific tracks were noted to have one-off genre influence as well: The track "Black Lungs" was described as nu metal. "Flight Without Feathers" was described as having elements of electropop due to its use of keyboard and sampled beats. Some publications noted that the album had abandoned its metalcore sound. The lyrical content examines the part humans are all playing in the world's slow destruction, and tackles the biggest questions facing the future of our planet. Such concerns have long been prevalent in the music of a band, who have continually championed and shared their platform with causes such as Sea Shepherd, are outspoken critics of activities like fox hunting, and who focus on sustainability in everything from their touring to merch production. The record reportedly "hangs in a limbo between energizing positivity that it is not too late to correct our collective course, and a paralyzing negativity of defeatism; where hope and despondency are bed-fellows triggered daily by the simple act of existence. A reflection of human condition, the line "For Those That Wish to Exist" calls for all of the humanity to rise to challenge established models and strive for a collective betterment."

In an official press release, the band explained that the record was inspired by global uncertainty in 2020 and looming threats to the future of mankind. Drummer and songwriter Dan Searle explaining and summarizing the record:

"This album was me looking at our inability to change to a way of life that would sustain the human race and save the planet. [...] I wanted to look in the mirror and ask ourselves the question of what are we going to do, as opposed to trying to point the finger at politicians. Change has to start on a personal level. The world has developed a culture of wanting someone else to deal with it, when we need to take our own responsibility. It has to start there."

== Release and promotion ==
On 20 October 2020, the band released the first single "Animals" along with an accompanying music video. The following day, the band revealed the tracklist, album's official artwork and announced that the album was set for release on 26 February 2021. On 22 October 2020, the band announced that to promote the album, they would play a special livestream show from the Royal Albert Hall in London on 21 November 2020, with the show to be screened around the world via the streaming service Veeps.

During the livestream, the band debuted two new songs from the album. According to Wall of Sound, "Discourse Is Dead" was the heavier, metalcore-inspired track while "Dead Butterflies" had more of an atmospheric, stadium rock sound behind it. They also debuted their latest single "Animals" live for the first time. On 2 December 2020, the band released the second single "Black Lungs" and its corresponding music video. On 20 January 2021, one month before the album release, the band released the third single "Dead Butterflies" alongside an accompanying music video of their livestream show at the Royal Albert Hall where the song debuted. On 8 February 2021, the band released the fourth single, "Meteor".

== Reception ==
=== Critical reception ===
Professional ratings
Aggregate scores
Source	Rating
AnyDecentMusic?	7.7/10
Metacritic	80/100
Review scores
Source	Rating
Clash	9/10
Dead Press!	10/10 stars
Distorted Sound	9/10
DIY	4/5 stars
Exclaim!	7/10
The Guardian	3/5 stars
The Independent	4/5 stars
Kerrang!	5/5 stars
The Line of Best Fit	7/10
NME	4/5 stars

For Those That Wish to Exist received generally positive reviews from critics. At Metacritic, which assigns a normalized rating out of 100 to reviews from mainstream critics, the album has an average score of 80 out of 100, which indicates "generally favorable reviews" based on 10 reviews. Aggregator AnyDecentMusic? gave the album 7.7 out of 10, based on their assessment of the critical consensus. Clash was positive towards the release stating, "This new release was needed, not just for the fans who have been dying to hear new music, but needed for the music community in general. The current climate is dark, moody, uncertain with the pandemic in mind, but this new album brings joy and happiness in a time where it is needed most." Damon Taylor from Dead Press! rated the album positively calling it: "Ambitious in its scope and armed with an abundance of riffs and hooks, Architects successfully transition into their new chapter whilst not losing their identity." Distorted Sound scored the album 9 out of 10 and said: "For Those That Wish to Exist is a brave new world for Architects, a new chapter for a band who are releasing themselves from the shackles and embracing every nook and cranny of the musical spectrum. It's a phenomenal effort and one which shows that there is still plenty of gas left in the tank. The future is here and Architects stand on the precipice of becoming one of the biggest bands on the planet. And boy, do they more than deserve it." DIY was also positive towards the release, calling it "...a neat summation of the contradiction at the core of Architects' recent career; the bleaker things get, the stronger they emerge." Exclaim! gave it 7 out of 10 and said: "For Those That Wish to Exist proves these guys can successfully diversify their sound."

The Guardian gave the album 3 out of 5 and stated: "For Those Who Wish to Exist proves Architects' ability to oscillate between thoughtful, interesting, finely wrought compositions and gleefully hulking exercises in metal obviousness is still intact. The fact it often feels stultifying regardless proves turning climate anxiety into gratifying entertainment is a very difficult art to master." Paul Travers of Kerrang! considered the release to be "...a long and constantly shifting album. It also sounds like it could be a crucial one in Architects' ongoing evolution." Sophia Simon-Bashall of The Line of Best Fit stated that "It's an album that has something to appeal to any ears, without compromising the true Architects' signature – you just have to be open to it." Dannii Leivers of NME was positive towards the release and stated that "For Those That Wish to Exist isn't exactly the kind of sonic reinvention one-time scene mates Bring Me the Horizon pulled off with 2019's Amo, but it pushes Architects into unexplored territory and a bold new future where even bigger venues and audiences surely await." Wall of Sound gave the album almost a perfect score 9/10 and saying: "To me, the purpose of For Those That Wish to Exist is for the listener to sit on what's being sung/screamed at them and for it to sink in over time. Sure, you're not going to get up and become a planet warrior overnight, but I feel by listening to this album over and over again, you'll subliminally be listening to what Architects are educating us about through their heavy, soothing and beautifully crafted music. From there, you can take your life into your own hands and play your part… but you better hurry up." Loudwire called it one of the best metal albums of 2021.

=== Accolades ===
Publication	Country	Accolade	Rank	Ref.
Kerrang!	UK	The 50 best albums of 2021	3	
Loudwire	US	The 45 Best Rock + Metal Albums of 2021	9	
Metal Hammer	UK	The top 10 metalcore albums of 2021	3	
Revolver	US	25 Best Albums of 2021	12	
Loudwire	US	The 35 Best Metal Songs of 2021 ("Dead Butterflies")	7	

== Commercial performance ==
Once released, the album debuted at number one in Australia and in the United Kingdom. For Those That Wish to Exist debuted and peaked at number 1 in their home country, gifting them their first top ten on the UK Albums Chart as well their first UK chart topper. It sold 12,542 copies in its first week, outselling Maxïmo Park's Nature Always Wins by 550 sales. In the United States, the album peaked at number 80 on the Billboard 200, becoming their highest charting album on the chart by selling 6,750 units in its first week.

== Track listing ==
All lyrics are written by Dan Searle; all music is composed by Architects.

For Those That Wish to Exist track listing
No.	Title	Length
1.	"Do You Dream of Armageddon?"	1:38
2.	"Black Lungs"	3:51
3.	"Giving Blood"	3:32
4.	"Discourse Is Dead"	3:46
5.	"Dead Butterflies"	4:02
6.	"An Ordinary Extinction"	4:07
7.	"Impermanence" (featuring Winston McCall of Parkway Drive)	4:02
8.	"Flight Without Feathers"	3:48
9.	"Little Wonder" (featuring Mike Kerr of Royal Blood)	3:47
10.	"Animals"	4:04
11.	"Libertine"	4:01
12.	"Goliath" (featuring Simon Neil of Biffy Clyro)	4:17
13.	"Demi God"	4:26
14.	"Meteor"	4:01
15.	"Dying Is Absolutely Safe" (featuring Liam Kearley of Black Peaks)	4:59
Total length:		58:21

== Personnel ==
Credits adapted from AllMusic.

Architects

- Sam Carter – lead vocals
- Josh Middleton – lead guitar, backing vocals, production
- Adam Christianson – rhythm guitar, backing vocals
- Alex "Ali" Dean – bass, keyboards, drum pad
- Dan Searle – drums, percussion, programming, production, engineering, vocal production

Additional musicians

- Winston McCall of Parkway Drive – guest vocals on track 7
- Mike Kerr of Royal Blood – guest vocals on track 9
- Simon Neil of Biffy Clyro – guest vocals on track 12
- Liam Kearley of Black Peaks – guest drums on track 15
- Amelie Searle-Desbiens – additional vocals
- Choir Noir – additional vocals
- Alexander Verster – double bass
- Patrick James Pearson – piano
- Tim Lowe – cello
- Ignacio Montero Requena, Jari Kamsula, Palle Schou Nielsen and Susanne Skou – horns
- Fabrice Godin, Jens Vind and Marek Stolarczyk – trombone
- Anders Farstad, Nicholai Andersen and Tristan Button – trumpet
- Edward Bale – viola
- Antonia Kesel and Will Harvey – violin
- Simon Dobson – brass, strings, arrangement
- The Parallax Orchestra – strings

Additional personnel

- Peter Miles – additional production, piano engineering, strings
- Adam "Nolly" Getgood – drum engineering
- Zakk Cervini – mixing
- Chris Athens – mastering
- Robin Adams – vocal editing
- Joachim Hejslet Jørgensen – brass arrangement
- Nick Steinhardt – design
- Giles Smith and Tom Welsh – photography

== Charts ==
Chart performance for For Those That Wish to Exist
Chart (2021)	Peak position
Australian Albums (ARIA)	1
Austrian Albums (Ö3 Austria)	5
Belgian Albums (Ultratop Flanders)	16
Belgian Albums (Ultratop Wallonia)	32
Canadian Albums (Billboard)	57
Czech Albums (ČNS IFPI)	74
Dutch Albums (Album Top 100)	39
Finnish Albums (Suomen virallinen lista)	14
German Albums (Offizielle Top 100)	3
Scottish Albums (Official Charts)	3
Swedish Hard Rock Albums (Sverigetopplistan)	9
Swiss Albums (Schweizer Hitparade)	7
UK Albums (Official Charts)	1
UK Independent Albums (Official Charts)	2
UK Rock & Metal Albums (Official Charts)	1
US Billboard 200	80
US Independent Albums (Billboard)	11
US Top Hard Rock Albums (Billboard)	4
US Top Rock Albums (Billboard)	11
