= Architects (British band) =

British metalcore band

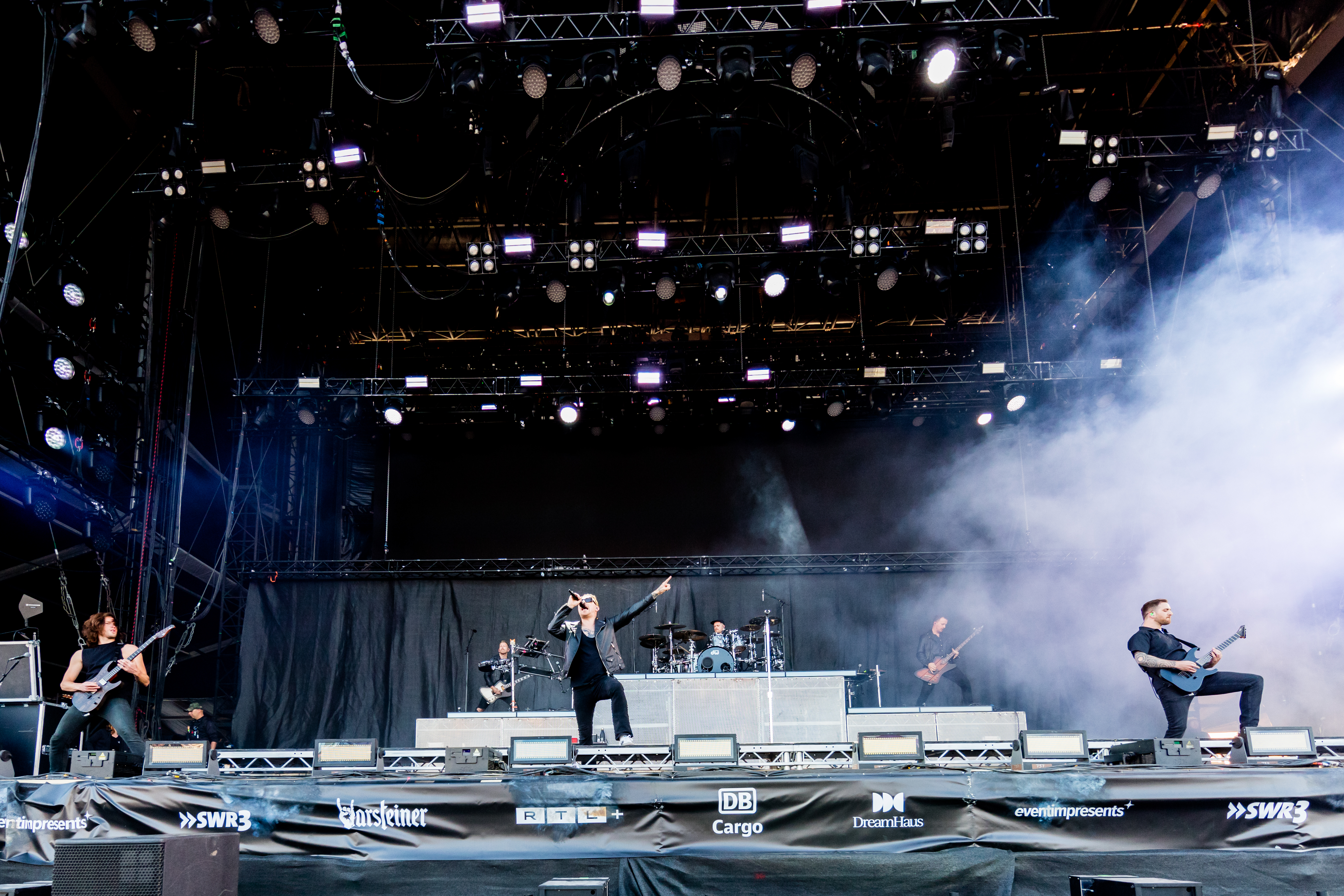
- Architects performing live at Rock am Ring in 2023.

Background information
- Origin: Brighton, East Sussex, England
- Genres: Metalcore; alternative metal; progressive metalcore; mathcore (early)
- Works: Discography
- Years active: 2004–present
- Labels: Epitaph; UNFD; New Damage; Get Deluxe; Zestone; Century Media; Thirty Days of Night; United by Fate; Distort; In at the Deep End
- Members: Dan Searle; Sam Carter; Alex Dean; Adam Christianson
- Past members: Tim Lucas; Matt Johnson; Tim Hillier-Brook; Tom Searle; Josh Middleton
- Website: architectsofficial.com

Architects are an English metalcore band from Brighton, East Sussex formed in 2004 by twin brothers Dan and Tom Searle. The band now consists of Dan Searle on drums, Sam Carter on vocals, Alex Dean on bass, and Adam Christianson on guitar. They have been signed to Epitaph Records since 2013.

Strongly influenced by bands such as The Dillinger Escape Plan, the sound of their first three albums was coarse, chaotic, and rhythmically complex. In 2011, Architects went in a more melodic post-hardcore direction with The Here and Now, alienating some of their fanbase. The following year, they returned towards their original style with Daybreaker, establishing a balance of melody and technical harshness while introducing more politicised lyrics. With the release of their sixth album Lost Forever // Lost Together in 2014, the band achieved lasting popularity and critical acclaim.

Soon after the release of their seventh album, All Our Gods Have Abandoned Us, in 2016, guitarist and principal songwriter Tom Searle died after three years of living with skin cancer, making Dan Searle the only original band member. In September 2017, the band released the single "Doomsday", the last song he was working on before his death, and announced Middleton as their new lead guitarist. The single is featured on Holy Hell, their first album recorded without Tom Searle, which was released in November 2018. Their ninth studio album, For Those That Wish to Exist, was released in 2021, and became their first chart-topper on the UK Albums Chart. Its follow-up, The Classic Symptoms of a Broken Spirit, was released in October 2022. Their eleventh studio album, The Sky, the Earth & All Between, was released on 28 February 2025.

== History ==
=== Formation, Nightmares and line-up changes (2002–2007) ===
All of the original members of Architects grew up around Brighton, East Sussex and were very active within the local music scene prior to forming the band. Sam Carter, who was a drummer and studied drums at the Brighton Institute of Modern Music before joining the band, had performed in multiple local bands as a drummer and sometimes a singer; one of these bands had supported Enter Shikari in Brighton.

Architects was founded in 2004 by drummer Dan Searle and his twin brother, guitarist Tom Searle. The project was called "Counting the Days" until it blossomed into what is now known as "Architects" with original vocalist Matt Johnson, guitarist Tim Hillier-Brook and Tim Lucas on bass guitar. In 2005, the band released a demo which would contain their first recorded material under the name of Architects. It was made available only for family and select friends, and a copy was later auctioned for charity in 2021.

In 2006, the band's original bassist, Tim Lucas, decided to leave the band to pursue his academic career. He was replaced by Alex Dean. The band had travelled around the UK on many tours supporting a number of different bands (including Beecher and Bring Me the Horizon) in support of their debut album Nightmares. Because of the age of the band members in the early years they had to book weeks of holiday off at college to do tours round the country. Just six months after the release of Nightmares, Architects original vocalist Matt Johnson left the band.

=== Arrival of Sam Carter, Ruin and Hollow Crown (2007–2009) ===
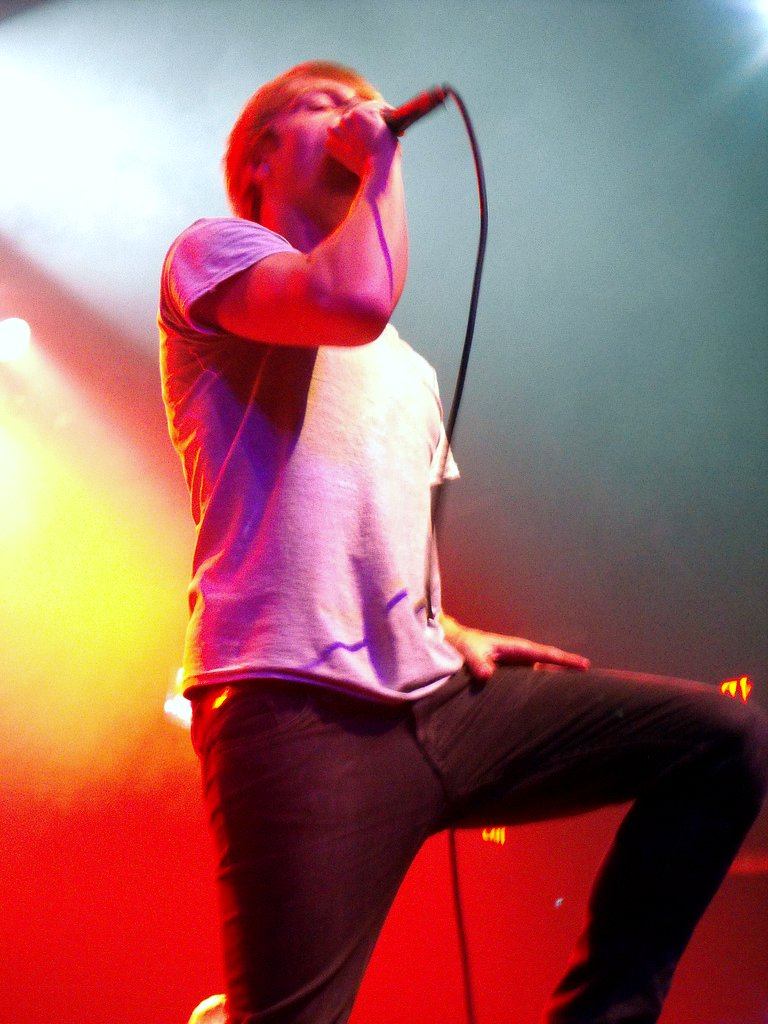
Sam Carter performing in 2009 at the Electric Factory in Philadelphia. Carter joined the band in 2007 after the departure of Matt Johnson.

After Johnson's departure, Dan Searle said that when Johnson left the band, they all saw Sam Carter performing with other local bands and decided it was an "easy choice". Ali Dean approached Carter while he was at work and had a few band practices. When Carter joined as Architects' new lead vocalist he made his on-stage debut by performing the song "The Darkest Tomb". After this amicable departure, Johnson went on to form the band Whitemare with ex-members of Johnny Truant and Centurion, and also briefly Architects guitarist Tim Hillier-Brook on bass. Architects released their second album Ruin on 25 October 2007. Despite releasing their debut album Nightmares the previous year the band felt they had developed as songwriters a lot and wished to release something quicker. Carter felt pressure when writing the lyrics for Ruin as he had a six-week period between joining Architects and going into the studio to record. Dan Searle commented that Carter drew from more personal experience in his lyrics than their previous singer Johnson. They supported Suicide Silence in 2007 on The Cleansing The Nation Tour in the United States.

In early 2008, they released a split EP with UK band Dead Swans, which featured two songs from each artist. Architects' contributed "We're All Alone" and "Broken Clocks", and Dead Swans contributed "In the Half Light" and "Swallow". The song "We're All Alone" was later worked into "Hollow Crown". Architects said that they wanted to release the album in an effort to show people they were still progressing their style. The EP was well received by British music press with review scores of 7/10 from Metal Hammer, 8/10 from Rock Sound, A 7.5 was given by Terrorizer for Architects' side of the EP and four "K"s out of 5 from Kerrang!. The release was followed by a double headed tour of the UK.

In May 2008, Architects announced that they had been signed to Century Media Records for a three album deal. Dean stated that the signing was important for the band "to be part of such an established label and it's absolutely sweet that our records are gonna be out worldwide." Dan Searle described Century Media's support matching "our ambition to push this band as far as we can." The announcement of their signing to Century Media was coupled with the re-release of their second album Ruin globally with the added bonus track "Broken Clocks". In November 2008, the band embarked on the Never Say Die! Tour, a European tour with Parkway Drive as the headline act and also support from Unearth, Despised Icon, Protest the Hero, Whitechapel and Carnifex.

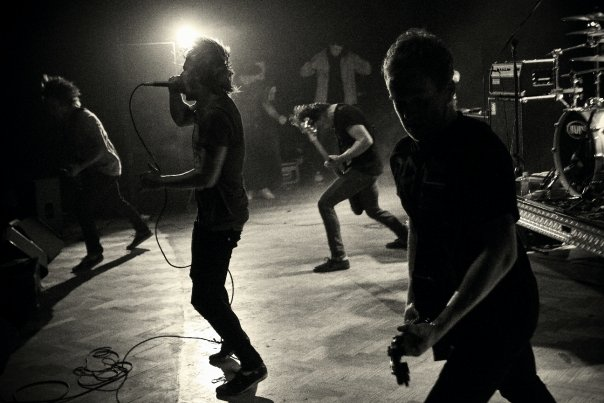
Architects live in Australia in 2009. From left to right: Tom Searle, Carter, Alex Dean and former guitarist Tim Hillier-Brook. Dan Searle is not visible.

On 26 January 2009, Architects made their Century Record debut with their third studio album Hollow Crown. It was released in the United Kingdom and Australia on 26 January 2009, 10 February in the United States and Canada, 20 February in Continental Europe and 21 February in Japan. The band recorded the album in July 2008 after the announcement of joining Century Media's roster. Dan Searle in interview was asked why the band gave it the title and he stated "depending on who you ask in the band! To me it refers to those people you meet in life that earn nothing, but are given everything." For the initial promotion of the album the band completed a 19 date headline tour of the United Kingdom with support from Misery Signals and A Textbook Tragedy. In early 2009, the band supported Parkway Drive along with August Burns Red on the Parkway Drive: The DVD tour in Australia. In October and November 2009, they headlined the second Never Say Die! Tour United Kingdom dates, whereas Despised Icon headlined the Mainland European dates. The line also included Horse the Band, As Blood Runs Black, Iwrestledabearonce, Oceano and The Ghost Inside. In January 2009, Tom Searle had believed the band had toured across North America and Europe in 17 separate tours.

=== The Here and Now, Daybreaker and Hillier-Brook's departure (2010–2012) ===
Architects announced that the first single from the upcoming fourth album would be entitled "Day in Day Out", and was premièred on Daniel P. Carter's BBC Radio 1 podcast The Rock Show on 30 August 2010. The band headlined tours of the UK in October 2010 with Norma Jean, Devil Sold His Soul and Lower Than Atlantis supporting and Australia in December with Comeback Kid as co-headliners and This is Hell and Rolo Tomassi supporting.

On 19 January 2011, Architects' fourth album The Here and Now was released. The album was recorded across 2010 from May till June at The Omen Room Studios in California and featured guest vocals from Andrew Neufeld of Comeback Kid and Greg Puciato of The Dillinger Escape Plan. The album was seen as going in a more commercial direction from the rest of the band's work. The album sold 900 copies in the United States in its first week and debuted at number 47 on the US Top Heatseekers album charts and number 57 on the UK Album Charts. Upon its release the album was well received by critics. Drummer Dan Searle, when describing the sound on the album in an interview, believed it was a massive departure but also a logical progression for the band, saying: "I completely understand that we are “known” for being a technical band but it's just not what we want to write any more, I think if you look at the way we have evolved over the last few records you could see it coming. We started writing technical music when we were 16 and have spent the years since slowly moving away from it, it feels like different people wrote those songs." When looking back at the album in hindsight the band has always seen the period the record was released in as one of difficulty and lack of confidence in themselves.

In February 2011, Architects announced the departure of bassist Alex Dean due to family commitments. On 3 July, it was announced that Dean had rejoined the band. When Dean commented on the short 5-month split from the band he said "I'm very happy to be able to say that I'm back, being able to stay at home for the past few months have given my family and I the opportunity to adjust to what happened last year and I know it's done us all a lot of good." During this period where Dean was not a part of the band, Casey Lagos (Stick to Your Guns) filled in as touring bassist.

In April 2011, Bring Me the Horizon, as part of the ongoing support for their third album on their international There Is a Hell... Tour, brought Architects alongside Parkway Drive who supported them across two continents. It started with a European tour, starting in the United Kingdom with The Devil Wears Prada as the opening support for the UK and dubstep group Tek-one opening for the remainder of continental Europe. On 28 April, Matt Nicholls broke his arm while playing football with members of Bring Me the Horizon, Parkway Drive and Architects, and instead of cancelling the tour Architects' drummer Dan Searle filled in as the drummer, this meant that Bring Me the Horizon's setlist was halved in length. This European tour lasted until late August. Architects, Parkway Drive and Deez Nuts supported Bring Me the Horizon in North America across September and October.

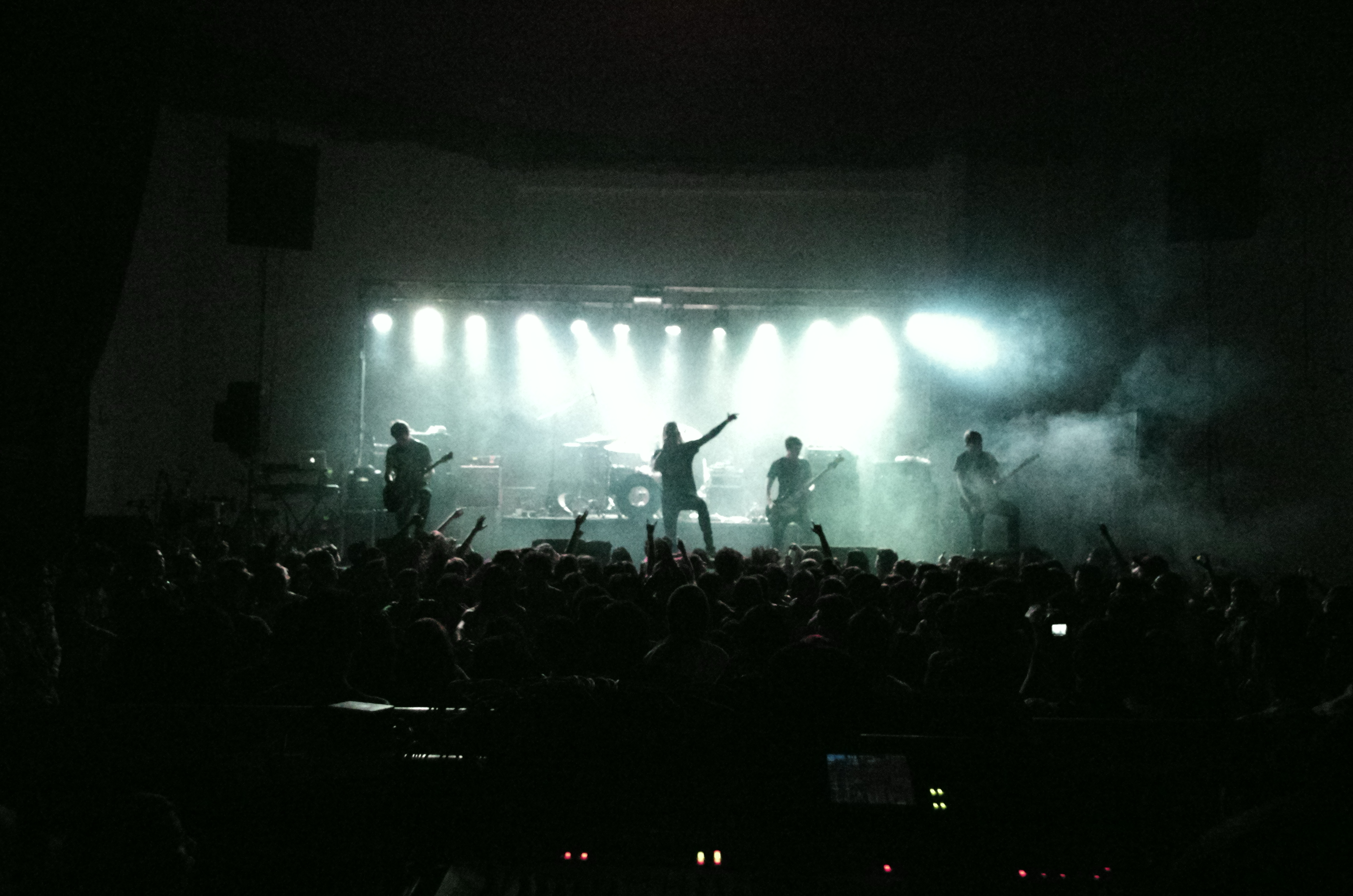
Architects performing in Bogotá, Colombia at the Teatro Metro Bogota on 27 April 2012

On 4 December, Architects released a new single entitled "Devil's Island". The song was for an at the time unnamed follow up album to The Here and Now. The single was announced in early November, a month before its actual release. As an iTunes bonus b-side song "Untitled" was added into the single download. In addition to its announcement it was streamed on the band's Facebook page. Both the song and the music video that accompanied the release talk about and deal with the 2011 England riots, with the music video featuring clips of the riots. The single itself was well received by critics for its return to the mathcore style of their third album, Hollow Crown. J.J. Nattrass of Bring the noise UK said that "the Track is sweeping and melodic in parts, whilst bursting with high tempo and visceral raw energy in others." In December 2011, the band embarked on a five-day UK headline tour with supporting acts Heights, Tek-One and Deaf Havana as part of supporting the single.

Architects' fifth studio album Daybreaker was released on 28 May 2012 in Europe and 5 June 2012 in the USA. On 16 April 2012, after the album was fully recorded, it was announced that Tim Hillier-Brook would be leaving the band to pursue other projects. Josh Middleton, the frontman of British metal band Sylosis became a touring guitarist until the band decided on a new fifth member. Daybreaker received a mixed reception from critics. Negative critics stated the album's songs were "catchy and occasionally compelling" but "identical and formulaic". The band promoted the Daybreaker album though a collection of 75 shows in 25 countries (over 4 continents, including: Southeast Asia, Australia, North America and Europe), called the Daybreaker Almost World Tour

=== One Hundred Days documentary and Lost Forever // Lost Together (2013–2015) ===
In 2013, the band promoted Daybreaker further, primarily in the United States, first supporting Enter Shikari in the US in March with Crossfaith and then as part of the American Warped Tour 2013 in June. They also played the main stage at Download Festival 2013 at Donington Park, Leicestershire, United Kingdom. Before their large touring schedule in the United States the band wasn't confident in performing as they were "tired of losing money" with their tours in the country and that "[the band] were about ready to give up on America". Architects announced that they were recording their sixth full-length album in September. The band announced they were doing a third tour of the United States in 2013 in November and December with co-headliners Protest The Hero and support from The Kindred and Affiance, as well as plans to go to Australia before 2013 had finished. Architects' final performance in support of Daybreaker is their first performance in India at the Saarang culture festival on 11 January 2014 with Romanian rock band Grimus. (Note: Architects also gave away the cash prize to the festival's "Decibles" competition winners Chromosome.)

In mid-April 2013, Architects released a trailer of their documentary One Hundred Days: The Story of Architects Almost World Tour. Directed by Tom Welsh, the documentary is a story about Architects' Almost World Tour. The funding for the film was done as a community funded project on indiegogo. The band decided to release the film since they had left Century Media. After the target amount had been reached for the film Architects posted a song clip of a new song, "Black Blood", online. The band's split from Century Media was after their contract expired and due to "a daily occurrence" of falling out. They then joined Epitaph Records roster for both an opportunity to break the American market and because of an admiration for bands on their roster like Every Time I Die and Converge.

Their sixth studio album, Lost Forever // Lost Together, was released on 11 March 2014, produced by Henrik Udd and recorded at the Gothenburg based studio Studio Fredman. Two singles were released to promote the record "Naysayer", "Broken Cross"; and a music video for "Gravedigger". In the support of the record's release Architects toured Europe in March and April with Stray from the Path and Northlane as main supports. They then completed a co-headline tour of the United States with Letlive in April and May; and then have lined up a supporting tour of The Amity Affliction in Australia, including two headline shows of their own in the country, and a Canadian tour in August and September.

In 2014, it was reported that all members of the band went vegan after watching several documentaries on the subject. On 18 February 2015, it was announced by Sam Carter that touring musician Adam Christianson had become a full-time member of Architects.

=== All Our Gods Have Abandoned Us and Tom Searle's death (2015–2017) ===
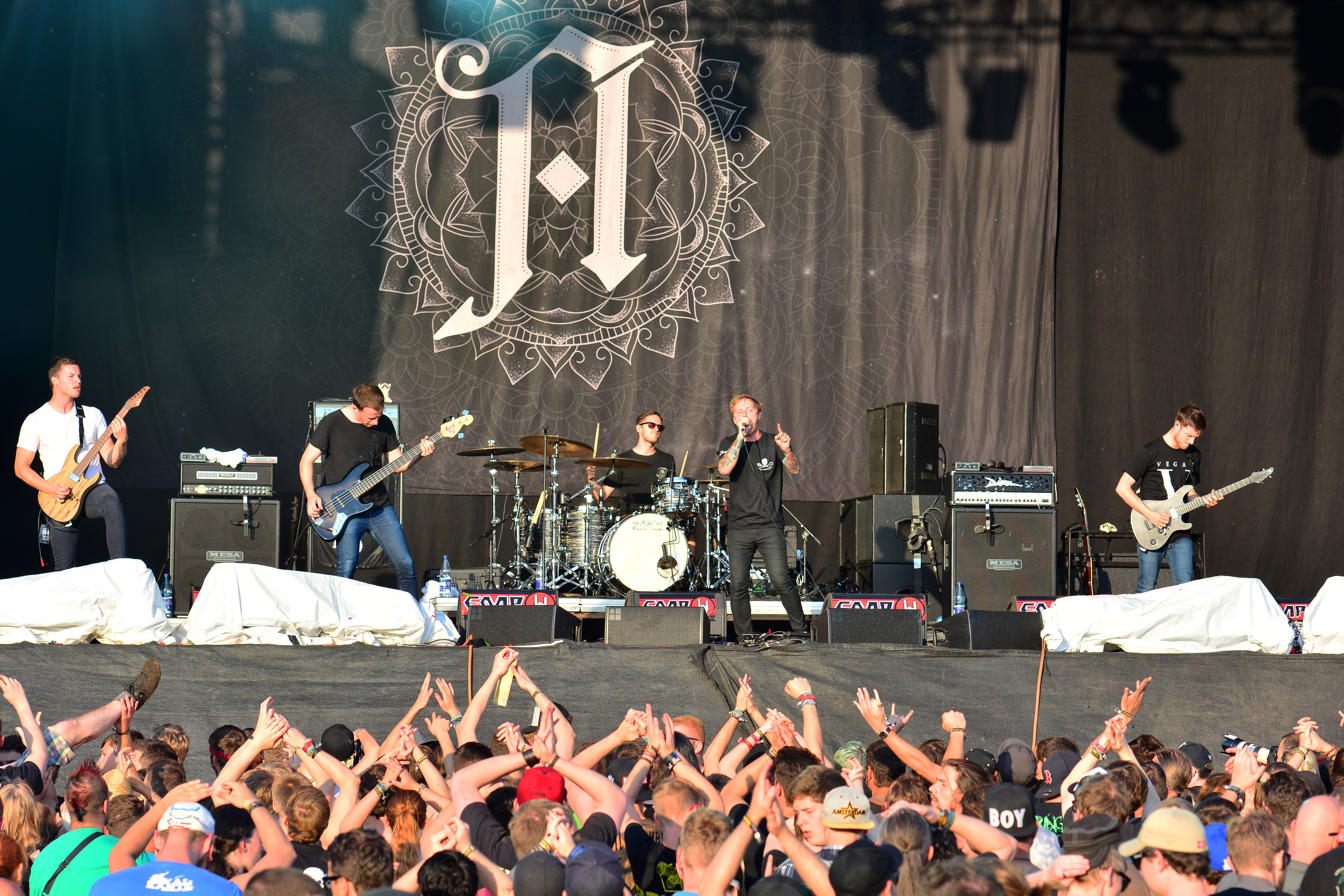
Architects performing live in Germany in 2015 with the late Tom Searle

On 12 June 2015, Tom Searle announced that the band started demoing new songs and he was excited for the release of a seventh album. On 6 March 2016, Epitaph Records released a new Architects song, "A Match Made in Heaven". It was the first single from All Our Gods Have Abandoned Us, which was released on 27 May. On 11 April, Architects released a second single, "Gone with the Wind". On 23 March, Architects announced a release show in Brighton for 27 May, supported by Counting Days. Due to unexpectedly high demand, the ticket website accidentally oversold tickets, prompting the band to add a second date on 28 May. Architects premiered a third song, "Downfall", on 20 May. On the same day, they announced a headline tour in the United Kingdom for November 2016. Architects also played a number of shows in mainland Europe and in North America during the summer.

It has been stated by Tom Searle that it is "a bunch of atheists thinking about whether or not there might be something bigger," and that due to his cancer he was becoming highly contemplative about life, and that this album is the product of that train of thought.

On 20 August 2016, founding guitarist and songwriter Tom Searle died at the age of 28, after living for three years with melanoma skin cancer. The extent of his condition was previously not made public, though he referenced it in the song "C.A.N.C.E.R" on Lost Forever // Lost Together. Searle was initially declared cancer free after a 2013 leg surgery, but the cancer returned. He was shown in the "In Memoriam" segment at the 2017 BRIT awards, and the song "Paragon" on the Northlane album Mesmer was written in tribute to him.

Tom Searle's twin brother and bandmate, Dan, confirmed in a statement on the band's official Facebook page that their upcoming Australian tour, as well as their UK and Europe headline tour, would still be taking place as a tribute to his brother following his death. On the future of the band, Dan Searle wrote, "We want to carry on, that is important to say, and we will strive to do so, but we will not release any music unless we truly believe that it is something that Tom would have been proud of. Whether or not we can achieve that is something that we will have to discover in time". Sean Delander of Thy Art Is Murder filled in for Searle on the Australian tour, and Josh Middleton of Sylosis filled in on the European tour.

=== Holy Hell (2017–2019) ===
On 7 March 2017, Daniel P. Carter released an episode of his SWIM (Someone Who Isn't Me) podcast with Dan Searle, through which Dan spoke out about his brother Tom's death for the first time and how he dealt with his illness. During which, he also explained that both he and Tom wrote songs for a new album together before his death, and music has been written since. On 24 August, the band won "Best Album" at the inaugural Heavy Music Awards in London for All Our Gods Have Abandoned Us. On the same day, the band also announced dates of a headline European tour, which includes their first ever arena date on UK shores, and by extension their biggest headline show to date.

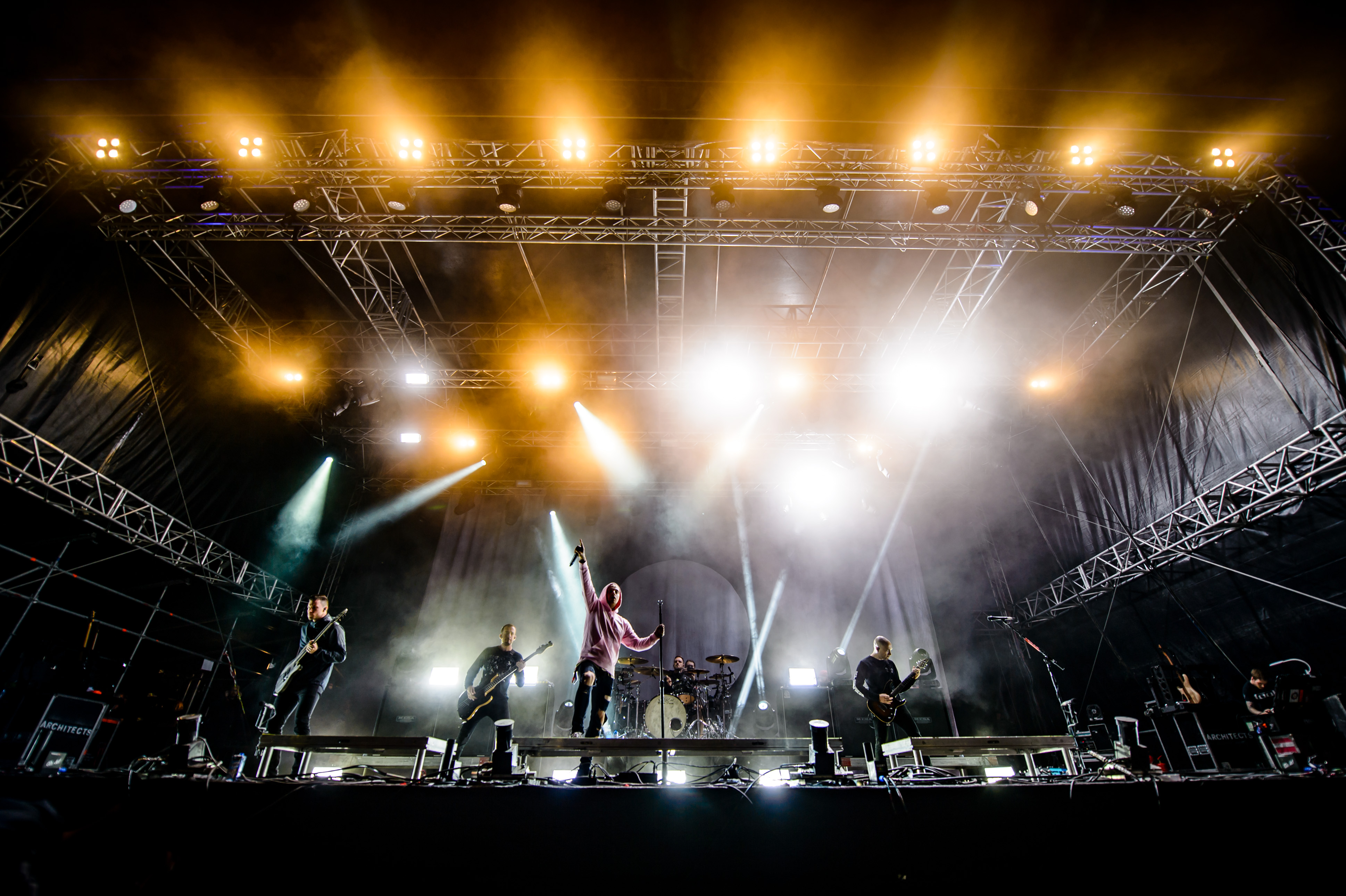
Architects performing at Summer Breeze Open Air 2017

On 6 September, Architects released a single titled "Doomsday". The single is the first material to be released by the band since the passing of Searle, and features new lead guitarist Josh Middleton in the music video. The song was released shortly after the band announced that they were beginning to work on new material. Dan Searle confirmed that "Doomsday" is a song that Tom Searle was unable to finish before dying, and also acts as their "way of showing everyone that there's still a future." The following day, Architects confirmed that Josh Middleton had become a full-time member of the band.

On 12 September 2018, the band announced that they will be releasing their eighth album, titled Holy Hell, on 9 November 2018. On the same day, the band released the album's first single, "Hereafter". On 3 October, the band released their second single, "Royal Beggars", and on 28 October, their third single, "Modern Misery". In 2019, the band was nominated for three Kerrang! Awards, 'Best Album', 'Best British Act', and 'Best British Live Act'. On 19 June, the band won the 'Best British Live Act' for the second year straight.

=== For Those That Wish to Exist and The Classic Symptoms of a Broken Spirit (2020–2023) ===
On 20 October 2020, the band released the first single "Animals" along with an accompanying music video. A day after, the band revealed the tracklist, album's official artwork and announced that their new ninth studio album For Those That Wish to Exist would be released on 26 February 2021. On 22 October, the band announced that to promote the album, they will play a special livestream show from the Royal Albert Hall in London on 21 November, with the show set to screened around the world via the streaming service Veeps.

During the livestream, the band debuted two new songs from their forthcoming album. According to Wall of Sound, "Discourse Is Dead" was the heavier, metalcore-inspired track while "Dead Butterflies" had more of an atmospheric, stadium rock sound behind it. They also debuted their latest single "Animals" live for the first time. On 2 December, the band released the second single "Black Lungs" and its corresponding music video. On 20 January 2021, one month before the album release, the band released the third single "Dead Butterflies" alongside an accompanying music video of their livestream show at the Royal Albert Hall where the song debuted. On 8 February, the band released the fourth single, "Meteor". On 17 May, Carter has lent his vocals to the theme for Final Fantasy XIV: Endwalker. He commented about being a part of the project: "Really proud to have been a part of this Final Fantasy XIV: Endwalker." On 17 June, the band received the Libera Awards as "Best Metal Record" for their song "Animals" by the American Association of Independent Music. On 12 November, the band announced another global livestream to round out the year with an exclusive performance of For Those That Wish to Exist live at Abbey Road Studios on 11 December via Veeps.

On 20 April 2022, the band released the brand new single "When We Were Young" along with an accompanying music video. The song premiered on BBC Radio 1's Future Sounds with Clara Amfo, along with an interview with Sam Carter afterwards. On 12 July, Architects unveiled the single "Tear Gas" and its corresponding music video. At the same time, they unexpectedly announced their tenth studio album, The Classic Symptoms of a Broken Spirit, released on 21 October 2022. On 30 August, the single "Deep Fake" was released. On 11 October, one week before the album release, the band released the fourth and final single "A New Moral Low Ground" along with a music video. On 28 May 2023, the band announced that lead guitarist Josh Middleton departed from the band on good terms.

=== The Sky, the Earth & All Between (2023–present) ===
On 4 December 2023, Architects premiered the music video for the new single "Seeing Red". In January 2024, the band attracted some controversy after guitarist Adam Christianson retweeted a post from Tim Pool in support of MMA fighter Sean Strickland's homophobic and transphobic comments in an interview. He subsequently apologized, saying "That retweet was a total accident!! I don't endorse anything that guy says other than fuck Trudeau." Sam Carter addressed the matter: "No one on this stage judges anybody for their gender, their race, and whoever they are in love with. That is not what this band stands for, and it is not what this band will ever stand for. We love every single one of you."

On 10 April 2024, Architects unveiled a brand new single "Curse" which was produced by former Bring Me the Horizon keyboardist Jordan Fish. On 19 November, the band released the single "Whiplash" and its corresponding music video. At the same time, they announced their eleventh studio album, The Sky, the Earth & All Between, would be released on 28 February 2025. On 14 January 2025, the band released the fourth single "Blackhole" along with a music video. The fifth and sixth singles, "Everything Ends" and "Brain Dead", with the latter featuring House of Protection, were released on 24 and 26 February respectively. On 21 January 2026, the band released "Broken Mirror" as the sixth and final single from the album, alongside a music video directed by Jensen Noen, and announced their Broken Mirror US tour in April and May 2026, supported by Holywatr.

On 16 September 2026, the band released a single entitled "Machine", following teasers posted to their social media the previous week.

== Artistry ==
=== Style and influences ===
In 2009, James Gill of Metal Hammer described the band's music as "pumped with both controlled rage and unhindered heart, accessible and ambitious, aggressive and beautiful". It has generally been described as metalcore as well as technical metal and progressive metalcore. Their early releases were categorized by critics as mathcore, and their later albums as alternative metal. Loudwire designated the band as being among modern metalcore's "Big Four", along with Bring Me the Horizon, Underoath and Parkway Drive.

Michael Wilson of the BBC compared the mass appeal of their aggressive style to that of Enter Shikari. It is characterised by choppy, complex guitar riffs, the use of obscure time signatures and rhythmic breakdowns, and guitarists alternating between a "down-tuned rumble" and "melodic punk" during songs. It is based on both technical proficiency and the use of catchy riffs and choruses.

Architects have made various stylistic transitions and evolutions throughout their career, with Sam Carter stating in a 2011 interview that each album should sound distinct. On their second album Ruin, the band's sound was heavier and darker than on their debut Nightmares. Hollow Crown maintained the aggression and technical proficiency of Ruin while incorporating more melody, catchy riffs and clean singing. The band also used synthesised instruments such as keyboards and drum machines. The guitars were tuned to Drop B with the lowest string at Ab, giving the "ability to create a really heavy low end sound on the bottom but still give a comfortable degree of tension on the higher strings." A prime example of their signature style is the song "We're All Alone", with its technical, progressive guitar riffs and hardcore punk-influenced breakdowns.

Their fourth album The Here and Now represented a stylistic shift considered "ultimately subjective" and "their most diverse". Described as going in a "clean-cut post-hardcore" direction, The Here and Now favours singing over screaming, anthemic choruses and hooks. The album still retains elements of their previous albums, however, including "tortured howls, frenzied riffs, and earth-shattering rhythms, albeit with a slightly more mainstream edge." The album includes the melancholy, glitchy electronica-based 'An Open Letter To Myself' and the rock ballad 'Heartburn' both lead into "rousing, fist-pumping choruses". The band's fifth album Daybreaker featured something of a return to the heavier, more aggressive style of their previous albums, balancing this with the melody and hooks of The Here and Now. Daybreaker also features even more melodic, atmospheric tracks than usual, such as "Truth Be Told", "Behind The Throne" and "Unbeliever".

After the release of Daybreaker the band grew confident in playing much heavier music again, also to create the best songs for live shows. The album also incorporates blastbeats, which have not been used in any of the band's recordings since Hollow Crown.

Architects' primary musical influences have been described as ranging through artists from the realms of hardcore punk and heavy metal music such as Botch, Converge, Decapitated, Deftones, The Dillinger Escape Plan, Gojira, Hatebreed, Meshuggah, Shadows Fall, Slipknot and Thrice, and Alex Henderson of AllMusic considers the band to be influenced by noise rock and math rock. Rock Sound Kevin Stewart-Panko writer sees the band as a "metal/hardcore outfit influenced by Meshuggah's low-end guitar lurch, the throat-shredding howl of Converge's Jake Bannon, The Dillinger Escape Plan's staccato one-two rhythms and breakdowns from the state of Massachusetts." Alter the Press! writer Selina Christoforou considered the band drawing on "the template drawn out by genre-defining bands, such as The Dillinger Escape Plan, Botch, and Coalesce".

According to Carter, "The Dillinger Escape Plan are such a massive influence on Architects. Back in the day, that's what we wanted to sound like when we were younger". He in the same interview also stated that Thrice's Vheissu (2005) is one of his favourite albums.

=== Songwriting and recording process ===
Vocally Carter is seen as having a coarse and "tortured" screaming style and implements melodic singing to counter this. Since Carter's addition to the band's line-up the band always aimed to use more of his singing as their style developed, regardless of reaction from fans. During the writing of The Here and Now in California, Carter got vocal coaching to help develop his singing voice. During these lessons Carter learned a lot about techniques, warm-ups and singing to scales. Carter's harsh vocals have also been compared to British metalcore contemporary Oliver Sykes of Bring Me the Horizon and his "raspy-yelling" vocals.

Architects are known for their thought-provoking, politically charged lyrics. When Sam Carter joined the band to replace Matt Johnson, drummer Dan Searle had commented that the lyrics Carter wrote drew from more personal experience than those of his predecessor. The lyrics of Hollow Crown focus on a number of themes, with some songs dealing with everyday life like sitting in a car with friends or angst against girls, while some other songs, particularly "Early Grave", "Follow the Water" and "In Elegance", were written about Carter's growing dependence on cannabis and him "struggling against his own instincts and self-destructive obsessions". Two songs featured on Hollow Crown – "Dead March" and "Left with the Last Minute" – feature "call and response-type" lyrics about a stalker and their victim's response to being stalked, respectively. For the lyrics of Daybreaker, Carter and Tom Searle collaborated on writing, focusing on what they believed to be "bigger picture" themes, such as the critique of negative aspects of religion and society. Carter and Searle collaborated again on the lyrics of Lost Forever // Lost Together, and in an attempt not to sound like a "broken record", they no longer only addressed political issues, but also focused on themes that everyone can relate to.

== Band members ==
Current

- Dan Searle – drums, percussion, programming (2004–present)
- Alex "Ali" Dean – bass (2006–2011, 2011–present); keyboards, drum pads (2016–present)
- Sam Carter – lead vocals (2007–present)
- Adam Christianson – rhythm guitar (2015–present; touring 2012, 2014–2015); backing vocals (2020–present); lead guitar (2023–present)

Current touring musicians

- Ryan Burnett – keyboards, percussion, rhythm guitar, backing vocals (2022–present)
- Martyn Evans – lead guitar, backing vocals (2023–present)

Former

- Tim Lucas – bass (2004–2006)
- Matt Johnson – lead vocals (2004–2007)
- Tim Hillier-Brook – rhythm guitar (2004–2012)
- Tom Searle – lead guitar, keyboards, programming (2004–2016; his death); rhythm guitar (2012–2015)
- Josh Middleton – lead guitar, backing vocals (2017–2023; touring 2016–2017); rhythm guitar (touring 2012)

Former touring musicians

- Casey Lagos – bass (2011)
- Bobby Daniels – bass (2011)
- Morgan Sinclair – rhythm guitar (2013–2014)
- Sean Delander – lead guitar (2016)
- Troy Wright – drums, percussion (2023; substitute for Dan Searle)
- Andrew McEnaney – drums (2024-2025; substitute for Dan Searle)

== Discography ==
- Nightmares (2006)
- Ruin (2007)
- Hollow Crown (2009)
- The Here and Now (2011)
- Daybreaker (2012)
- Lost Forever // Lost Together (2014)
- All Our Gods Have Abandoned Us (2016)
- Holy Hell (2018)
- For Those That Wish to Exist (2021)
- The Classic Symptoms of a Broken Spirit (2022)
- The Sky, the Earth & All Between (2025)

== Awards and nominations ==
Year	Organization	Award	Nominee/Work	Result	Ref.
2025	Nik Nocturnal Awards	Vocalist of the Year	Sam Carter	Nominated	
2025	Nik Nocturnal Awards	Collab Song of the Year	"Braindead"	Nominated	
2025	Nik Nocturnal Awards	Music Video of the Year	"Blackhole"	Nominated	
2025	Nik Nocturnal Awards	Album of the Year	The Sky, the Earth & All Between	Nominated	
