= Ruin (album) =

Studio album by Architects
- Released: 25 October 2007
- Recorded: March–April 2007
- Studio: Outhouse Studios, Reading, Berkshire, UK
- Genre: Metalcore, mathcore
- Length: 39:23
- Label: United by Fate; Distort; Century Media
- Producer: John Mitchell; Ben Humphreys; Architects

Architects studio album chronology
| Nightmares (2006) | Ruin (2007) | Hollow Crown (2009) |

Professional ratings
Review scores
| Source | Rating |
|---|---|
| AllMusic | 3/5 stars |
| Metalrage.com | 75/100 |

Ruin is the second studio album by English metalcore band Architects. It was released on 25 October 2007 through United by Fate, Distort and Century Media Records. The album was produced by John Mitchell, Ben Humphreys and the band themselves. It is the first album to feature vocalist Sam Carter and bassist Alex Dean.

== Composition ==
=== Style ===
Stylistically, this album displays a minor change in the band's style, with a more fluid yet darker metalcore sound. Clean vocals are implemented again in a few songs, to a larger extent than on Nightmares, although not as prominently as in later releases. The album features a change in guitar tuning, from drop C (which was used on Nightmares) to drop B, for all tracks, except "Low", which features the same tuning as drop B, but with the low B tuned to F# (the bass string on an eight string guitar).

Ruin was the first Architects album to feature new vocalist Sam Carter. His vocal style is quite different to that of previous vocalist Matt Johnson, marking a shift from screaming towards hardcore punk-style shouting. This is most obvious on the 2008 re-recording of "To the Death" (from Nightmares) that was available for download for a short period.

== Track listing ==
All lyrics are written by Sam Carter; all music is composed by Architects.

| No. | Title | Length |
|---|---|---|
| 1. | "Buried at Sea" | 3:42 |
| 2. | "Hunt Them Down" | 3:18 |
| 3. | "You'll Find Safety" | 3:33 |
| 4. | "Always" | 4:11 |
| 5. | "Sail This Ship Alone" (instrumental) | 1:55 |
| 6. | "Heartless" | 4:28 |
| 7. | "North Lane" | 3:15 |
| 8. | "I Can't See the Light" | 4:23 |
| 9. | "Low" | 2:23 |
| 10. | "Running from the Sun" | 3:43 |
| 11. | "Save Me" | 4:27 |
| Total length: | | 39:23 |

2008 re-release bonus track
| No. | Title | Length |
|---|---|---|
| 12. | "Broken Clocks" (featuring Nick Worthington of Dead Swans) | 3:42 |
| Total length: | | 43:05 |

== Personnel ==
Writing, performance and production credits are adapted from the album liner notes.

Architects

- Sam Carter – lead vocals
- Tom Searle – lead guitar, keyboards, programming
- Tim Hillier-Brook – rhythm guitar
- Alex "Ali" Dean – bass
- Dan Searle – drums, percussion, programming

Additional musicians

- Nick Worthington of Dead Swans – guest vocals on the bonus track "Broken Clocks"

Additional personnel

- Architects – production
- John Mitchell – production, engineering, mixing
- Ben Humphreys – production, engineering
- Tim Turan – mastering
- Greg Below – A&R
- Seldon Hunt – artwork design, layout

== Charts ==
| Chart (2007) | Peak position |
|---|---|
| UK Independent Albums (OCC) | 36 |
