= Dead Butterflies =

Single by Architects

from the album For Those That Wish to Exist
- Released: 20 January 2021
- Recorded: 2019–2020
- Studio: Brighton Electric (Brighton, East Sussex, UK)
- Genre: Arena rock; nu metal; post-hardcore; progressive rock
- Length: 4:02
- Label: Epitaph
- Songwriters: Dan Searle; Josh Middleton; Sam Carter; Adam Christianson; Alex Dean
- Producers: Searle; Middleton

Architects singles chronology
"Black Lungs" (2020)	"Dead Butterflies" (2021)	"Meteor" (2021)

Music video
- "Dead Butterflies" on YouTube

"Dead Butterflies" is a song by English metalcore band Architects. Produced by the band's drummer Dan Searle and lead guitarist Josh Middleton, it is featured on the group's 2021 ninth studio album For Those That Wish to Exist. The track was released as the third single from the album on 20 January 2021. It was written by Dan Searle alongside the rest of the band, and was produced by Searle and Josh Middleton. It peaked at number 18 on the Billboard Mainstream Rock Songs chart in October 2021.

== Background ==
The song was debuted live on 21 November 2020, at livestreamed performance of the song at Royal Albert Hall in London. It was later released as the third single off of their ninth studio album, For Those That Wish to Exist, on 20 January 2021. The music video for "Dead Butterflies" was released on the same day. It was directed by Tom Welsh & Taylor Fawcett, featuring performance footage from the Royal Albert Hall show. The album version of the track was later released on 26 February. It peaked at number 18 on the Billboard Mainstream Rock Songs chart in October 2021, it being only their second song to reach the chart in their twenty year career, the first being "Animals" earlier in the year.

== Composition ==
"Dead Butterflies" has been described as an arena rock song. ABC.net.au/Double J described the song as still having the band's trademark "love of sonic mass" including "huge guitars, booming drums, sleek production, and an orchestral section". The publication also asserted that the song blended elements of progressive rock, nu metal, and post-hardcore. Many publications alternatively decided to simply refer to it as "rock".

== Reception ==
Multiple publications praised the song for showcasing the band's growth in songwriting and performing. Loudwire praised the song for showing the band's "tremendous growth and progression" since their metal beginnings as a band, calling the song a "purely anthemic rock number" without a "metalcore breakdown or 'blegh' [scream] in sight".

== Personnel ==
Architects

- Sam Carter – lead vocals, lyricist, composition
- Josh Middleton – lead guitar, backing vocals, lyricist, composition, production
- Adam Christianson – rhythm guitar, backing vocals, lyricist, composition
- Alex "Ali" Dean – bass, keyboards, drum pad, lyricist, composition
- Dan Searle – drums, percussion, programming, lyricist, composition, production

Additional personnel

- Zakk Cervini – mixing

== Charts ==
Chart performance for "Dead Butterflies"
Chart (2021)	Peak position
US Hot Hard Rock Songs (Billboard)	21
US Mainstream Rock (Billboard)	18
