= Doomsday (Architects song) =

Single by Architects

from the album Holy Hell
- Released: 7 September 2017
- Recorded: 2017
- Studio: Middle Farm Studios (Newton Abbot, Devon, UK)
- Genre: Metalcore
- Length: 4:07
- Label: Epitaph; UNFD
- Songwriters: Sam Carter; Josh Middleton; Adam Christianson; Alex Dean; Dan Searle
- Producers: Architects; Jordan Fish

Architects singles chronology
"Gravity" (2017)	"Doomsday" (2017)	"Hereafter" (2018)

Alternate cover
- Piano reprise version cover

"Doomsday" is a song by English metalcore band Architects. Originally released as a standalone single on 7 September 2017, the song is included in the band's eighth studio album Holy Hell, released on 9 November 2018. It was the first new material recorded by the group since the death of their original lead guitarist and primary songwriter Tom Searle in 2016. The track was written and self-produced by the band, with additional production from Bring Me the Horizon keyboardist Jordan Fish. "Doomsday" charted at number 17 on the UK Rock & Metal Singles Chart.

== Composition and lyrics ==
"Doomsday" evolved from a song that was originally part-written by former Architects lead guitarist Tom Searle during sessions for the band's seventh album All Our Gods Have Abandoned Us. Following the guitarist's death on 20 August 2016, his brother Dan (the group's drummer) completed the song's lyrics in preparation for its release. The track was ultimately credited to Architects as a collective. Searle commented upon its release that "Completing it for him was a massive responsibility". The lyrical themes within "Doomsday" have been related to Searle's death by critics, especially lines such as "they say the good die young". Writing for Noisey, Tom Connick explained that the song "is about [Dan's] conflicted feelings regarding the loss, and is a marker of Architects' poise in the face of extreme sadness".

== Promotion and release ==
"Doomsday" was released on 6 September 2017 as the first new Architects material since Tom Searle's death. It was made available as a digital download the following day. The song was not specifically recorded for a new studio album, although Dan Searle did suggest upon its release that it would feature on their next record. The track charted at number 17 on the UK Rock & Metal Singles Chart. The band played the song live for the first time for BBC Radio 1's "Radio 1 Rocks" show on 31 October. Three months after the song's digital release, "Doomsday" was issued as a 7" vinyl on 8 December 2017, limited to 1,000 copies.

In July 2018, the band released an alternate version of "Doomsday", featuring James Beckwith on piano. Speaking about the "acoustic piano ballad", Searle suggested that the song "needed a rendition that exposed the sadness behind the lyrics", which he claimed vocalist Sam Carter delivered "beautifully". In December 2018, the WWE announced that the song would be featured as one of the themes of their NXT UK TakeOver: Blackpool event.

== Music video ==
The music video for "Doomsday" was directed by Stuart Birchall, who had previously worked on a number of other videos for the band, most recently for All Our Gods Have Abandoned Us lead single "A Match Made in Heaven" in 2016. According to Zoe Camp of Revolver magazine, it "finds the band members tearing through the song against a starry backdrop, performing so intensely that, at times, they appear to break apart themselves". Metal Hammer columnist Eleanor Goodman described it as "a moving video featuring Tom's twin brother, drummer Dan, suspended in the expanse of the universe".

== Critical reception ==
"Doomsday" was met with acclaim from music critics. Kerrang! Radio described the song as "a goosebump-inducing anthem of the highest calibre". Scott Munro of Metal Hammer called it "blistering", while Eleanor Goodman of the same publication dubbed it "honest" and "beautiful". Brii Jamieson of music magazine Rock Sound described the song's piano reprise as "an emotional rollercoaster". Clash writer Robin Murray called it "simple, sparse, and really rather beautiful", praising Sam Carter's "rather special" vocal performance. Kelsey Shawgo of Alternative Press described "Doomsday" as "powerful" and called it "a banger".

== Personnel ==
Architects

- Sam Carter – lead vocals, production
- Josh Middleton – lead guitar, backing vocals, production
- Adam Christianson – rhythm guitar, production
- Alex "Ali" Dean – bass, keyboards, drum pad, production
- Dan Searle – drums, percussion, programming, production

Additional personnel

- Jordan Fish – additional production
- Adam "Nolly" Getgood – engineering, mixing
- Ermin Hamidovic – mastering

== Charts ==
Chart performance for "Doomsday"
Chart (2017)	Peak position
UK Rock & Metal (Official Charts)	17
