= The Here and Now =

Studio album by Architects
- Released: 19 January 2011
- Studio: The Omen Room (Garden Grove, California)
- Genre: Melodic hardcore; metalcore; math metal
- Length: 39:15
- Label: Century Media
- Producer: Steve Evetts

Architects studio album chronology
Hollow Crown (2009)	The Here and Now (2011)	Daybreaker (2012)

Singles from The Here and Now
- 1. "Day in Day Out" Released: 28 September 2010; 2. "Learn to Live" Released: 18 January 2011; 3. "Heartburn" Released: 9 May 2011

The Here and Now is the fourth studio album by English metalcore band Architects. It was released on 19 January 2011 through Century Media Records in the United Kingdom and majority of Europe, and 20 January 2011 in the United States. The album was recorded with producer Steve Evetts at his own studio The Omen Room Studios in California.

== Background and recording ==
Architects worked with producer Steve Evetts at The Omen Room Studios, Garden Grove, California. The band were excited to record with Evetts because of his expansive repertoire. Carter commented on how he installed confidence in the band as they produced their music. The band members in interviews noted how Evetts strived to capture the sound of the band's live performance to give the record and energetic sound. The band's drummer Dan Searle said on the subject "A lot of bands go for super fake sounding recordings that no band can recapture live and that's exactly what we wanted to move away from. The record really captures the energy that we have as a live band."

While in California, vocalist Sam Carter received vocal training to develop his singing range, where he learnt singing techniques, warm-ups and singing to scales.

During the recording the band was concerned that they were going to alienate their fanbase with the record, however they did not want to record "Hollow Crown Part II". This is in line with the band's desire to always sound different on each record. Nonetheless, by the end of the recording process, the band was confident in the record's sound. The band attributed this change primarily to the fact that they had changed and grown up in the two years since Hollow Crown was released and because the music they were all listening to and were inspired by wasn't metal or punk.

The album features guest vocal appearances from Andrew Neufeld of Comeback Kid and Greg Puciato of The Dillinger Escape Plan, the latter being a large influence on the group. The decision to include Neufeld was when he offered his vocals when they were both touring Australia in 2010; Puciato was included after coming to watch them record in California and liked the sound of the record and offered to sing on the album, something the band members were excited to do.

== Composition ==
=== Style and theme ===
The album's style been described as melodic hardcore, metalcore, and math metal while possessing shades of emo; a style different from the technical metalcore sound of Hollow Crown. The record is defined by its half time rhythmic tempo, complemented by intense drumming, anthemic choruses and a contrast between screamed vocals and clean emo/rock vocals. This is also contrasted by more sublime moments in the songs utilising harmonies and electronics giving a grand sound. The first track "Day in Day Out" opens with "discordant guitars and Sam Carter's combination of fierce roars and clean, soaring vocals". During the development of The Here and Now the band felt a lot more positive and appreciative of the level of success they had achieved. This had an effect on the band style, but also a significant influence on the album's lyrics, which became far more positive.

In 2023 interview with Metal Hammer, Carter stated that the intention for the album was to merge the sounds of Comeback Kid and Foo Fighters with the progressive music stylings of Pink Floyd and Radiohead.

== Release and promotion ==
"Day in Day Out" was released digitally as the album's first single on 27 September 2010 in the United Kingdom and majority of Europe, and 28 September 2010 in the United States. It was later accompanied by a music video, which premièred online on 30 November 2010, through Alternative Press website. The band chose the track as the first single because it stylistically sounds closest to Hollow Crown off this record.

The last promotional tours they did for The Here and Now was on a UK tour with Deaf Havana, Tek-One and Heights with their new song "Devil's Island". The tour was well received, Rock Sound gave the band an eight out of ten rating saying praising Carters' command of fans and his "orchestration" of circle pits. Alter The Press! noted how the set list was a balance of The Here and Now and Hollow Crown, commenting that it demonstrates "just how huge both albums are".

== Critical reception ==
Professional ratings
Review scores
Source	Rating
AllMusic	2.5/5 stars
Alternative Press	4/5 stars
Angry Metal Guy	1.5/5
BBC Music	(favourable)
Exclaim!	(mediocre)
Rock Sound	8/10

The album received a very mixed response from critics. While critics noted the subjective nature of their musical departure from the sound of their previous records, and that the record stylistically had a more mainstream edge, they also consistently praised the melodic approach of the album. Jon O'Brien of AllMusic gave the record two and a half stars out of five, criticising Architects' lack of exploration of the melodic approach shown on songs "An Open Letter to Myself" and "Heartburn".

Keith Carman of Alternative Press, in a four out of five review, gave overall praise to the album saying "[...] Architects have never been as refined or grandiose. Familiar without seeming like retread and progressive but far from alienating, The Here and Now is concrete proof that there's still some life left in emotionally charged melodic hardcore." Raziq Rauf when writing for the BBC Music gave the album a favourable review saying "The increased accessibility and diversity of this album should allow them to extend their reach, and while their attitude remains to continue to develop their talents and repertoire, nobody can begrudge them their ambition." Travis Persaud of Exclaim! gave a mediocre review of the record saying "The Here and Now certainly isn't a failure [...] but there are no moments that reach beyond what's already been done, causing the album to be stuck at "good, but I'd rather listen to something else" status." Kevin Stewart-Panko when writing for Rock Sound magazine in an eight out of ten score review noted how the band tried to fit "10 pounds of inspiration into a five-pound song" and this led to slip ups. He further commented that "Architects have completed a study in contrasts on The Here and Now. They're obviously moving beyond their roots, but they need to investigate the value of reigning and corralling their ideas."

=== Retrospect ===
After the release of the record, the band aimed to distance themselves from its release. Promotion for the record was relatively short, as the band became unimpressed and bored by the music. After doing one phone interview for the press of The Here and Now, Tom Searle asked his manager to not be involved in any interviews or journalist during The Here and Now promotion. The band also regretfully disliked the direction for some of the music videos for the record, particularly "Heartburn", which they begrudgingly said made them look like Westlife. The band didn't enjoy the live performances of the record as they felt the more ballad-like songs lacked the same aggressive power they wanted from their live shows. With their future release Daybreaker the band felt they had a "point to prove". In a 2013 interview Carter commented that they believed their sixth record, Lost Forever // Lost Together was distancing themselves "once and for all" from the "car crash" that was The Here and Now.

== Commercial performance ==
Upon its release, the album debuted at number 57 on the UK Album Charts and number 1 on the UK Rock Chart. The singles from the album received rotation on the BBC Radio 1 daytime playlist. Internationally, the record appeared at number 47 on the United States Top Heatseekers chart after selling 900 copies. The album received a negative response from their fanbase upon its release.

== Track listing ==
All lyrics are written by Sam Carter; all music is composed by Architects

No.	Title	Length
1.	"Day In Day Out"	3:10
2.	"Learn to Live"	4:01
3.	"Delete, Rewind"	3:08
4.	"BTN"	3:57
5.	"An Open Letter to Myself"	3:16
6.	"The Blues"	3:16
7.	"Red Eyes"	4:17
8.	"Stay Young Forever" (featuring Andrew Neufeld of Comeback Kid)	3:02
9.	"Heartburn"	3:37
10.	"Year In Year Out / Up and Away" (featuring Greg Puciato of The Dillinger Escape Plan)	7:27
Total length:		39:15

Century Media special edition digipak
No.	Title	Length
11.	"Day in Day Out" (Big Chocolate remix)	4:47
Total length:		44:02

Japanese bonus track (includes special edition digipak bonus track)
No.	Title	Length
12.	"Learn to Live" (Big Chocolate remix)	4:30
Total length:		48:32

2012 special edition
No.	Title	Length
11.	"Devil's Island"	4:07
12.	"Untitled"	3:29
13.	"Day in Day Out" (Big Chocolate remix)	4:47
Total length:		51:38

Notes

- The song "Year In Year Out" ends at minute 5:00. After 30 seconds of silence (5:00 - 5:30), begins the hidden song "Up and Away".

== Personnel ==
Architects

- Sam Carter – vocals
- Tom Searle – lead guitar, keyboards, programming
- Tim Hillier-Brook – rhythm guitar
- Alex "Ali" Dean – bass
- Dan Searle – drums, percussion, programming

Additional musicians

- Andrew Neufeld of Comeback Kid – additional guest vocals on track 8
- Greg Puciato of The Dillinger Escape Plan – additional guest vocals on track 10

Studio personnel at Omen Room Studio

- Steve Evetts – production, mixing, engineering
- Allan Hessler – engineering

Studio personnel at West West Side Music

- Alan Douches – mastering

Additional personnel

- Jon Barmby – artwork, design, layout

== Charts ==
Chart (2011)	Peak position
Scottish Albums (Official Charts)	63
UK Albums (OCC)	57
UK Rock & Metal Albums (Official Charts)	1
US Heatseekers Albums (Billboard)	47

== Release history ==
Country	Date	Label	Format	Catalog number	Source
Japan	19 January 2011	Doom Patrol^{1}	CD	DOOM-0033	
Austria	21 January 2011	Century Media	CD; Digipak	9980312; 9980318	
Germany	21 January 2011	Century Media	CD; Digipak	9980312; 9980318	
Switzerland	21 January 2011	Century Media	CD; Digipak	9980312; 9980318	
Europe (excl. Austria, Germany and Switzerland)	24 January 2011	Century Media	CD; Digipak	9980312; 9980318	
Canada	Distort	Century Media	CD	DE29	
Australia	28 January 2011	Century Media	CD; Digipak	— —	
New Zealand	28 January 2011	Century Media	CD; Digipak	— —	
^{1} Denotes licensing deal: released under the authority of Century Media. — Denotes unknown or non-existent information.
