= Heights (band) =

British hardcore punk band

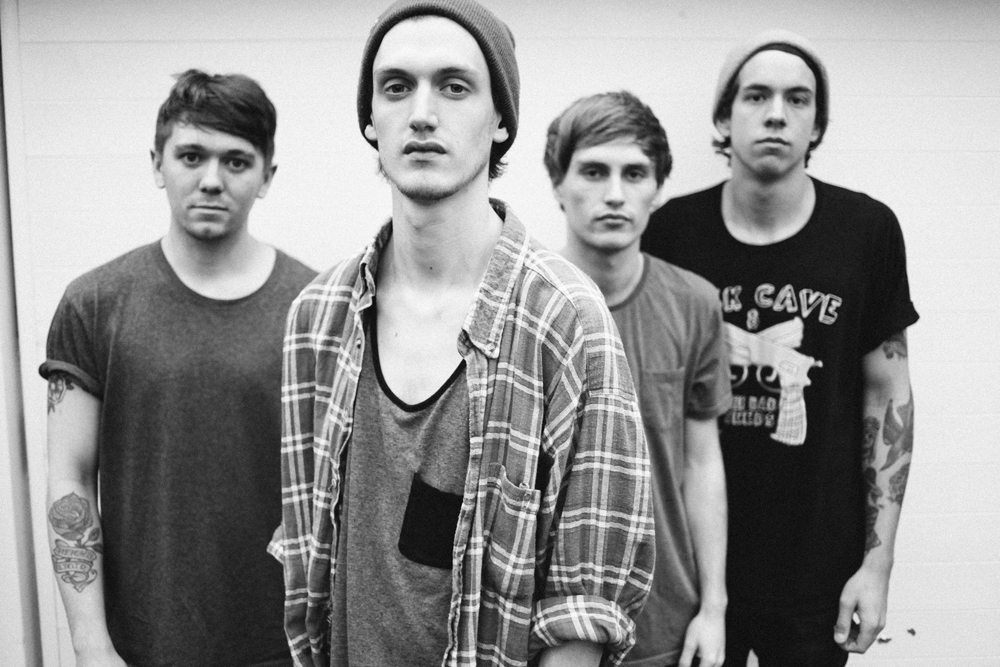
- Heights in 2012

Background information
- Origin: Welwyn Garden City, Hertfordshire, UK
- Genres: Post-hardcore, hardcore punk, post-metal
- Years active: 2009–2014
- Labels: Mediaskare, Transcend Music, Destroy Everything
- Past members: Thomas Debaere; Andrew Moulder; Dean Richardson; Tom Green; Tom Hutton; Alex Monty
- Website: weareheights.com

Heights were a British hardcore punk band from Welwyn Garden City, England. Formed in 2009, the band's line-up as of 2014 consisted of vocalist Alex Monty, guitarists Dean Richardson and Tom Green and drummer Tom Hutton. They drew musical influences from a variety of styles, including but not limited to groups such as Devil Sold His Soul, Architects, Underoath, Comeback Kid, Nick Cave and the Bad Seeds and Gallows.

The band released their debut album Dead Ends on 21 June 2011 through Mediaskare Records to critical acclaim – it was the first album of the year to receive a KKKKK (5/5) rating by Kerrang! and also gained 8/10 scores from both Metal Hammer and Rocksound magazines. The release saw the band tour extensively with varied number of bands in alternative music like Architects, Biohazard and Attack Attack!. Following the release of their debut album, the band left Mediaskare Records and signed to Transcend Music.

This coincided with the original lead vocalist leaving the band, prompting Alex Monty (formerly on bass) to take the reins as the bands frontman. Alex offered a different style of vocals, leading Heights to their second and thought to be final album Old Lies For Young Lives, which released in 2013.

In 2014, the band released a three-track EP entitled "Strangers", which would be their final studio material to be released before their break up.

The original line up broke up in 2014. Former band members opted to pursue other musical ventures, the most notable being guitarist Dean Richardson joining the band Frank Carter and the Rattlesnakes. Former lead vocalist Thomas Debaere has since formed a metalcore band known as "Counting Days" who released their debut album, Liberated Sounds in 2015.

== History ==
=== Dead Ends (2010–2011) ===
Heights recorded their first studio album at Outhouse Studios in Reading, United Kingdom. It was released on 21 June 2011 to critical acclaim. Kerrang! magazine awarded the album 5/5 and at the time of print was the only album that year to receive full marks. The album also received an 8/10 review from Metal Hammer and Rocksound magazines.

In support of the album Heights completed a number of tours and festival appearances including their second appearance on the Red Bull Stage at Download Festival 2011. The end of 2011 saw Heights tour alongside Architects, Deaf Havana and Tek One on their most diverse and biggest tour to date. At the end of 2011 Dead Ends was listed in the top 100 albums of the year by Big Cheese magazine, and also noted as Kerrang! editor James McMahon's 10th favourite album of the year.

=== Lineup change and "These Streets / Gold Coast" (2012) ===
In 2012, Heights continued touring as they supported Biohazard and Attack Attack! on their UK tours.

They also announced the end of the Dead Ends era with a special one off show at The Peel in Kingston – the band said this would be the last time fans could hear some songs of the album as they looked towards their next album.

In March 2012 the band released two songs for free though their website titled "These Streets" and "Gold Coast". Lead track 'These Streets' was premiered exclusively on Daniel P Carter's Radio 1 Rock Show on 13 March and has since received airplay on BBC Radio 1 and XFM.

Also in March it was announced that Heights were nominated for 'Best New Band' at the Metal Hammer Golden Gods Awards 2012.

After returning from a European tour on 6 May they announced that they had kicked out vocalist Thomas Debaere. The band released no official announcement or explanation for a week and on 10 May announced that bassist Alex Monty would be taking over on vocals alongside a sample titled "Heights Is Dead".

The band announced the position of bass would be left open until the right person was found, and that friends would play live with them until that time. On 4 June the band entered Outhouse Studios in Reading to record their second studio album, with no details on the release announced. During July and August 2012 Heights toured Australia in support of House Vs. Hurricane for the Crooked Teeth tour, they ended the year touring with Architects and While She Sleeps in Europe during October and November.

=== Old Lies for Young Lives (2013–2014) ===
Heights first tour of 2013 was in support of Your Demise in the UK during February 2013.

On 11 February 2013, Daniel P Carter premiered their first single "Eleven Eyes", taken from their second album on the Radio 1 Rock Show. The video was released the following day, featuring Sam Carter as a guest vocalist.

Just after the tour, Heights announced that their second album Old Lies For Young Lives was to be released on 29 April 2013, with appearances at Hevy, Summerjam and Slam Dunk festivals scheduled for the summer. Domestically, they scheduled a headlining tour – their first in the UK – covering nine dates from the end of September and into October 2013.

=== Breakup, final release ===
In March 2014, the band announced their break-up, stating that "towards the end of last year a couple of us just didn’t feel the same passion that we always relied upon and without that, we all knew it was time. In fact, we’re closer as friends than we’ve ever been, and we plan to spend the last few months and shows enjoying the end to what will forever be something we are all proud of". Shortly after the announcement, the band announced a farewell tour across the UK and Europe from September to October 2014, later featuring two other UK bands known as "The Catharshits" and "Echoes". The band would also announce a farewell Australian tour spanning the month of September 2014, as well as a South-East Asian tour in the same month. The band would also release a 3 track 7-inch EP entitled "Strangers" before their last shows. The band's very last show took place in London on 5 October 2014.

In 2015, the band uploaded a video to their YouTube channel entitled "Cabin Fever", documenting their last 25 shows as a band with compiled live footage from the shows.

== Members ==
Final line-up

- Dean Richardson – guitars, keyboards (2009–2014)
- Tom Green – guitars (2009–2014)
- Tom Hutton – drums (2009–2014)
- Alex Monty – vocals (2012–2014), bass (2011–2012)

Former

- Thomas Debaere – vocals (2009–2012)
- Andrew Moulder – bass (2009–2011)

== Discography ==
=== Studio albums ===
- Dead Ends (2011), Mediaskare
- Old Lies for Young Lives (2013), Transcend Music

=== EPs ===
- The Land, the Ocean, the Distance (2009), self-released
- Strangers 7 (2014), Destroy Everything

=== Singles ===
- "These Streets / Gold Coast" (2012), self-released
