= Nightmares (Architects album) =

Studio album by Architects
- Released: 15 May 2006
- Studio: Springlodge Recording Rooms, Colchester, Essex, UK
- Genre: Metalcore; mathcore
- Length: 30:24
- Label: In at the Deep End; Distort
- Producer: Karl Bareham; Architects

Architects studio album chronology
Nightmares (2006)	Ruin (2007)

Nightmares is the debut studio album by English metalcore band Architects. It was released on 15 May 2006 through Distort and In at the Deep End Records. The album was produced by the band themselves and Karl Bareham. It is the only album featuring the band's original line-up with Matt Johnson on vocals, as well as Tim Lucas on bass.

== Track listing ==
All tracks are written by Architects.

No.	Title	Length
1.	"To the Death"	2:41
2.	"You Don't Walk Away from Dismemberment"	4:58
3.	"Minesweeper"	3:32
4.	"They'll Be Hanging Us Tonight"	3:31
5.	"This Confession Means Nothing"	3:29
6.	"In the Desert"	4:05
7.	"A Portrait for the Deceased"	4:23
8.	"The Darkest Tomb"	3:42
Total length:		30:24

== Personnel ==
Architects

- Matt Johnson – lead vocals
- Tom Searle – lead guitar, keyboards, programming
- Tim Hillier-Brook – rhythm guitar
- Tim Lucas – bass
- Dan Searle – drums, percussion, programming

Additional personnel

- Architects – production
- Karl Bareham – production, mixing, mastering, recording
