= All Our Gods Have Abandoned Us =

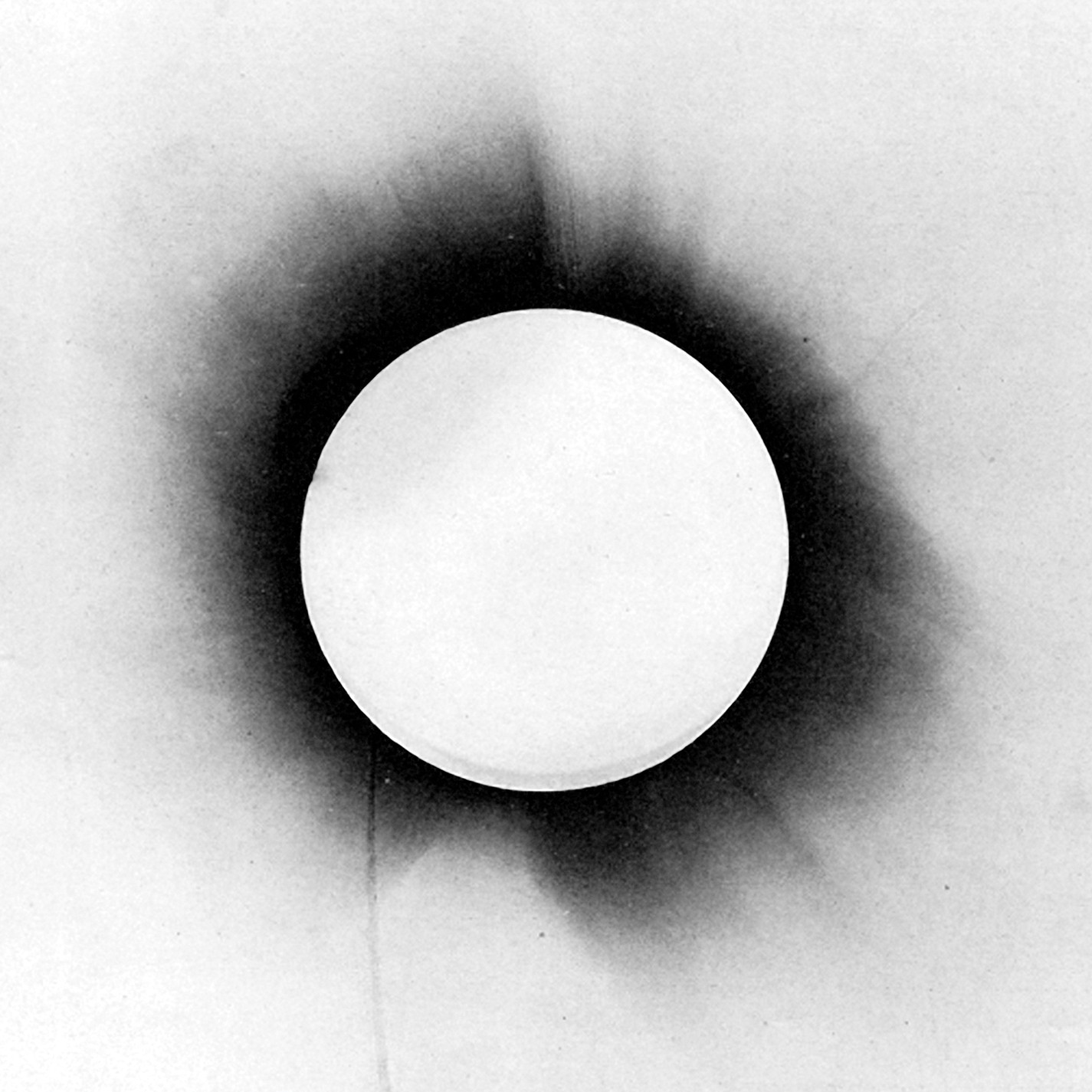

Studio album by Architects
- Released: 27 May 2016
- Studio: Studio Fredman (Gothenburg, Sweden)
- Genre: Metalcore
- Length: 46:15
- Label: Epitaph; UNFD; New Damage
- Producer: Henrik Udd; Fredrik Nordström; Randy Slaugh; Architects

Architects studio album chronology
Lost Forever // Lost Together (2014)	All Our Gods Have Abandoned Us (2016)	Holy Hell (2018)

Singles from All Our Gods Have Abandoned Us
- 1. "A Match Made in Heaven" Released: 6 March 2016; 2. "Gone with the Wind" Released: 11 April 2016; 3. "Downfall" Released: 20 May 2016; 4. "Phantom Fear" Released: 22 May 2016; 5. "Gravity" Released: 21 February 2017

All Our Gods Have Abandoned Us is the seventh studio album by English metalcore band Architects. It was released on 27 May 2016 globally through Epitaph Records; with the exception of UNFD in Australia and New Damage in Canada. The album peaked at No. 109 on the Billboard 200, and reached No. 15 on the UK Albums Chart.

It is the band's first album to feature guitarist Adam Christianson, following his addition to the band as a full-time member after his tenure as a touring guitarist through 2012 to 2015. It is also the band's final album to include founding guitarist and primary songwriter Tom Searle, before his death on 20 August 2016.

Recorded in Gothenburg, Sweden, it was described by Blabbermouth.net as the "heaviest and darkest work to which Architects have ever put their name to [sic]" and "an album that challenges and progresses a genre long thought to have stagnated, and embraces its inspirations at a time when many rock and metal bands seek to hide them in search of mainstream acceptance".

== Writing and recording ==
In an article published by the band's Australian record label UNFD, it is stated that the band flew to Gothenburg, Sweden in October 2015 to begin recording the album at Studio Fredman, where they had recorded their previous album Lost Forever // Lost Together nearly two years prior. The album was recorded in "seven grueling weeks" with producers Hendrik Udd and Fredrik Nordström.

On 30 March 2016, the band's record label Epitaph uploaded the first part of a video documentary on the writing and recording process surrounding All Our Gods Have Abandoned Us, to their official YouTube channel. In the video, the band spoke on how they had entered the recording process with much more confidence than they previously exhibited when working on their past material. The initial loss of confidence was largely due to the backlash from fans surrounding their 2011 album The Here and Now. The band was dissatisfied with the album, which created a feeling of "uncertainty" amongst Architects as to what course of action needed to be taken in order to move on from the album.

The band chose to follow a similar style of music to their previous album Lost Forever // Lost Together, as it was the album that propelled the band forwards in terms of popularity and reception amongst critics and fans. Partly because of this, the band elected to re-unite with producers Henrik Udd and Fredrik Nordström for their seventh record. Tom Searle, the band's former guitarist, expressed great enthusiasm for the sound that these producers had shaped for their previous album, reminiscing on hearing the initial demo for the track "Naysayer". Searle felt that there was no need to "roll the dice again" by looking for a different producer to work on their new album, stating that the band were confident with their two established producers and were largely impressed with their previous album. The band again hired producer/arranger Randy Slaugh (who had done string arrangements on Lost Forever // Lost Together) to record real brass and strings in "Memento Mori".

Blabbermouth.net described the album's lyrical themes as showcasing "worldwide anger and disillusion", saying the album "wrestles with contemplations of death, god and faith in search of some semblance of hope for a world increasingly consumed by fear, anger and confusion. This album is [Architects'] statement of intent to the world, it is time to stand up, take notice and be counted."

The album's title is derived from a line within the album's opening track "Nihilist". In an interview with HMV, vocalist Sam Carter described the title as being "a statement about the dark and weird place the world is these days, we seem to have abandoned the simpler ways of living life and moved to a place where we're just trying to fuck each other over. Whether our gods have abandoned us or we've abandoned them, it's a statement with real impact. When you see that title you know this is going to be a heavy record. Heavy in title, heavy in songs."

== Release and promotion ==
Music videos for the singles "A Match Made in Heaven", "Gone With the Wind" and "Downfall" were released on 6 March, 11 April and 20 May 2016, respectively. The band cancelled the US Headliner Tour that was scheduled to occur throughout July and early August 2016 in support of the album due to "a family emergency," which turned out to be a euphemism for Tom Searle's cancer taking its toll. The guitarist and songwriter died in late August. In spite of Tom's death, the band completed their United Kingdom and Australian tour in Tom's honour.

Architects announced in August 2017 that they would be embarking on a European tour in early 2018 in support of the album, featuring Josh Middleton of Sylosis who had filled in live for Tom since his passing and had become a full-time member of the band. The band also finished the touring cycle for the album with a sell-out headline show at Alexandra Palace in London, performing alongside While She Sleeps and Counterparts in February 2018 in front of 10,000 people.

== Critical reception ==
Professional ratings
Aggregate scores
Source	Rating
Metacritic	82/100
Review scores
Source	Rating
AllMusic	4/5 stars
Clash	8/10
Distorted Sound	9/10
Exclaim!	8/10
Metal Hammer	4.5/5 stars
PopMatters	7/10 stars
Q	4/5 stars
Rock Sound	9/10
Sputnikmusic	4.5/5
Ultimate Guitar	7.7/10

All Our Gods Have Abandoned Us was met with critical acclaim from music critics. At Metacritic (a review aggregator site which assigns a normalised rating out of 100 from music critics), based on 7 critics, the album has received a score of 82/100, which indicates "universal acclaim".

Writing for Metal Hammer, Stephen Hill praised the album, particularly for "ripping up their own rulebook" and drawing on a diverse range of influences, making comparisons to bands such as Cult of Luna, Biffy Clyro, and Lamb of God. Hill singled out the closing track 'Memento Mori' for particular praise, describing it as "not just the most important song this band have ever recorded; it's the moment where Architects make the jump to stand utterly alone." He closed his review by writing that "In an album full of loud noises, the loudest noise above it all is the sound of every other metalcore band on Earth choking on Architects' dust." Writing for Exclaim!, Griffin J. Elliott gave the album a positive review, calling it "so goddamn heavy and fast it sounds like what one could only assume smoking crack cocaine with Northlane sounds like."

On 24 August 2017, the band won Best Album at the inaugural Heavy Music Awards in London for All Our Gods Have Abandoned Us.

=== Accolades ===
Publication	Country	Accolade	Year	Rank
Dead Press!	UK	Top 10 Albums of the Year	2016	1
Rock Sound	UK	Readers' Poll: Album of the Year 2016	2016	1

== Track listing ==
All lyrics are written by Tom Searle; all music is composed by Architects.

All Our Gods Have Abandoned Us —Standard edition
No.	Title	Length
1.	"Nihilist"	2:51
2.	"Deathwish"	3:52
3.	"Phantom Fear"	4:06
4.	"Downfall"	4:04
5.	"Gone with the Wind"	3:45
6.	"The Empty Hourglass"	4:11
7.	"A Match Made in Heaven"	3:48
8.	"Gravity"	3:18
9.	"All Love Is Lost"	4:20
10.	"From the Wilderness"	3:44
11.	"Memento Mori"	8:12
Total length:		46:15

All Our Gods Have Abandoned Us —Bonus track for Australian Deluxe Edition
No.	Title	Length
12.	"Silver Bullet"	3:05
Total length:		49:20

Notes

- Initially, the track 11 "Memento Mori" appeared to be misspelled on the album's iTunes pre-order page as "Momento Mori". This misspelling was also present on external publications documenting the album and on external merchandise websites. However, it was fixed before the album's official release.

== Personnel ==
Architects

- Sam Carter – vocals
- Tom Searle – lead guitar, keyboards, programming, electronics, strings, brass instruments, lyrics
- Adam Christianson – rhythm guitar
- Alex "Ali" Dean – bass
- Dan Searle – drums, percussion, programming, electronics

Additional musicians

- Linda Seare, Rebecca Bill and Jennifer Allen – violin
- Michael Rollins – viola
- Sara Cerrato and Elizabeth Clarke – cello
- Elizabeth Shill – French horn
- Tom Francis – bass trombone

Production

- Architects – production, engineering
- Henrik Udd – production, engineering, mixing, mastering
- Randy Slaugh – production, engineering, arranging
- Fredrik Nordström – additional production, engineering
- Ken Dudley – assistant engineering
- Nick Steinhardt – design

== Charts ==
Chart performance for All Our Gods Have Abandoned Us
Chart (2016)	Peak position
Australian Albums (ARIA)	2
Austrian Albums (Ö3 Austria)	17
Belgian Albums (Ultratop Flanders)	40
Belgian Albums (Ultratop Wallonia)	111
Canadian Albums (Billboard)	83
French Albums (SNEP)	139
German Albums (Offizielle Top 100)	8
New Zealand Albums (RMNZ)	25
Scottish Albums (OCC)	14
Swiss Albums (Schweizer Hitparade)	27
UK Albums (OCC)	15
UK Independent Albums (OCC)	3
UK Rock & Metal Albums (OCC)	1
US Billboard 200	109
US Independent Albums (Billboard)	9
US Top Rock Albums (Billboard)	13
US Top Hard Rock Albums (Billboard)	5
