= Holy Hell (Architects album) =

Studio album by Architects
- Released: 9 November 2018
- Recorded: 2017–2018
- Studios: Middle Farm, Newton Abbot, Devon, UK
- Genres: Metalcore; progressive metalcore
- Length: 42:41
- Labels: Epitaph; UNFD
- Producers: Dan Searle; Josh Middleton

Architects studio album chronology
All Our Gods Have Abandoned Us (2016)	Holy Hell (2018)	For Those That Wish to Exist (2021)

Singles from Holy Hell
- 1. "Doomsday" Released: 7 September 2017; 2. "Hereafter" Released: 12 September 2018; 3. "Royal Beggars" Released: 3 October 2018; 4. "Modern Misery" Released: 28 October 2018

Holy Hell is the eighth studio album by English metalcore band Architects. It was released on 9 November 2018 through UNFD and Epitaph Records. The album was produced by Dan Searle and Josh Middleton. It is the follow-up to the band's previous album All Our Gods Have Abandoned Us, and is the first record without founding member and main songwriter Tom Searle, following his death from skin cancer in August 2016.

== Background ==
Architects' guitarist Tom Searle died on 20 August 2016, after his three-year battle with skin cancer. His death had a traumatic effect on the other members of the band. Sam Carter, the band's lead vocalist, noted at the final date of a European tour in the Brixton Academy in London he felt "this could be the last time I do this".

On 7 September 2017, Architects released the song "Doomsday", which Tom Searle had started to write during the production of their seventh album All Our Gods Have Abandoned Us, as a single. However, it did not make the album's final tracklist but it was later added to the tracklist of Holy Hell as the tenth track. An alternative piano reprise version of the song was released on 13 July 2018. After the successful release of the song the band organised a one date, sold-out performance at the 10,000 capacity venue Alexandra Palace in London, with support from While She Sleeps and Counterparts. This was the largest headline performance the band had played in their career. Due to the close relationship Carter and the rest of the band had established with Jeremy Corbyn and the Labour Party, there was a discussion as to whether Corbyn could speak before their performance. Much like how he had at Glastonbury festival, however it was decided against by the party. Architects' drummer and brother of Tom, Dan Searle, addressed the crowd and thanked them for their continued support.

== Writing and recording ==
Following the band's performance in Brixton Academy on their 2017 European tour, Josh Middleton, Sylosis guitarist and touring member for the band, sent demos of songs to Searle. Middleton along with Searle became dominant songwriters on the record. This period of writing new music brought confidence to the band about continuing to perform. By the time the band had selected "Doomsday" to release as a single they had written that and five other songs. Tom Searle had written the main guitar riff "Doomsday" was based on. Elements of songs used on the album are based upon writing Tom Searle had written before his death, however Dan Searle in an interview said that they do not want to disclose which songs were derived from Tom's work, saying "We don't want to say because we don't want people's perspectives of the songs to be swayed by having that information."

Dan Searle had a major role in writing of the album's lyrics. Searle stated the theme "for me, broadly speaking Holy Hell is about pain: the way we process it, cope with it, and live with it. [...] There is value in pain. It's where we learn, it's where we grow." He was inspired by his brother's lyric writing, focusing on religion and particular juxtaposed metaphors "heaven and hell" and "angels and demons".

== Release and promotion ==
On 10 September 2018, Architects released teaser videos online which utilised instrumental versions of "Doomsday" and "Memento Mori", which were later that day taken down. The band released the album's lead single, "Hereafter", in conjunction with the public release of the album art, release date and track listing. The album art was created by Dan Hillier. Merlin Alderslade, when writing for Metal Hammer about the song, noted how it featured a more "streamlined" approach to Architects' musical style than previous work and was a greater indication of Holy Hell's sound than "Doomsday". The second single from the album "Royal Beggars" was released 3 October, then the third "Modern Misery" was released on 28 October 2018.

In promotion of the album, the band announced the dates of the tour, starting in December 2018 in Russia and Ukraine. The rest of the tour dates for the United Kingdom and the Mainland Europe is set in January and February 2019, with support from Polaris and Beartooth. Within days of the release of tickets, a second date at O2 Victoria Warehouse in Manchester was added.

== Critical reception ==
Professional ratings
Aggregate scores
Source	Rating
Metacritic	90/100
Review scores
Source	Rating
AllMusic	4/5 stars
Clash	8/10
Dead Press!	10/10 stars
DIY	4/5 stars
Kerrang!	5/5 stars
Metal Hammer	4/5 stars
Metal Injection	10/10 stars
New Noise Magazine	5/5 stars
NME	5/5 stars
Sputnikmusic	3.5/5 stars

Holy Hell has received widespread critical acclaim. At Metacritic, which assigns a normalised rating out of 100 to reviews from mainstream critics, the album received an average score of 90, based on 8 reviews, which indicates "universal acclaim".

Dave Stewart of Punktastic gave a favourable review of the album and its attention to detail and emotional intensity, saying "A mere two years since [Tom Searle's] passing, to even consider releasing a record is commendable. The fact that the record is so intricate and powerful is a credit to the band, both musically and mentally. To make something so impressive out of a situation so dire is beyond admirable." Zach Redrup of Dead Press! gave the album a 10 out of 10 score, praising the album's more frequent incorporation of electronic and atmospheric elements over previous albums. Wall of Sound rated the album a perfect 10/10 stating "this album is magnificent. It not only wraps up Tom Searle's time within the band perfectly but also kicks off the next era without him."

In a 4 out of 5 star review, AllMusic concluded "Holy Hell is both a teardown and a rebuild, and while it isn't always an easy listen, there is some hard-won catharsis to be found in its attempt to distill the messiness of grief into four-minute blasts of sonic demolition." Kerrang! gave the album a perfect score, calling it "gut-wrenching, hauntingly desolate and emotionally devastating." The album was also nominated for a Kerrang! Award for 'Best Album', but lost to Ghost's Prequelle.

== Track listing ==
All lyrics are written by Dan Searle; all music is composed by Architects. (Note: Several songs feature parts written by Tom Searle before his death, however the group has not disclosed which.)

No.	Title	Length
1.	"Death Is Not Defeat"	3:45
2.	"Hereafter"	4:15
3.	"Mortal After All"	3:39
4.	"Holy Hell"	4:13
5.	"Damnation"	4:08
6.	"Royal Beggars"	4:01
7.	"Modern Misery"	4:13
8.	"Dying to Heal"	3:50
9.	"The Seventh Circle"	1:48
10.	"Doomsday"	4:08
11.	"A Wasted Hymn"	4:34
Total length:		42:41

== Personnel ==
Architects

- Sam Carter – lead vocals
- Josh Middleton – lead guitar, backing vocals, production
- Adam Christianson – rhythm guitar
- Alex "Ali" Dean – bass, keyboards, drum pad
- Dan Searle – drums, percussion, programming, production

Additional musicians

- Amelie Searle-Desbiens – additional vocals
- Will Harvey and The Parallax Orchestra – strings

Additional personnel

- Jordan Fish – additional production on "Doomsday"
- Adam "Nolly" Getgood – engineering, mixing
- Peter Miles – strings engineering
- Ermin Hamidovic – mastering
- Robin Adams and Joel Hamilton – editing assistance
- Jordon Beal (né Popp) – additional editing assistance
- Dan Hillier – artwork
- Jon Barmby – layout

== Charts ==
Chart performance for Holy Hell
Chart (2018)	Peak position
Australian Albums (ARIA)	8
Austrian Albums (Ö3 Austria)	13
Belgian Albums (Ultratop Flanders)	34
Belgian Albums (Ultratop Wallonia)	79
Canadian Albums (Billboard)	72
Dutch Albums (Album Top 100)	85
Finnish Albums (Suomen virallinen lista)	34
French Albums (SNEP)	108
German Albums (Offizielle Top 100)	7
Italian Albums (FIMI)	88
Scottish Albums (Official Charts)	17
Swiss Albums (Schweizer Hitparade)	17
UK Albums (Official Charts)	18
UK Independent Albums (Official Charts)	2
UK Rock & Metal Albums (Official Charts)	1
US Billboard 200	89
US Independent Albums (Billboard)	3
US Top Hard Rock Albums (Billboard)	5
US Top Rock Albums (Billboard)	14
