= Animals (Architects song) =

2020 song by Architects

Single by Architects

from the album For Those That Wish to Exist
- Released: 20 October 2020
- Recorded: 2019–2020
- Studio: Brighton Electric (Brighton, East Sussex, UK)
- Genre: Metalcore; hard rock
- Length: 4:04
- Label: Epitaph
- Songwriters: Dan Searle; Josh Middleton; Sam Carter; Adam Christianson; Alex Dean
- Producers: Searle; Middleton

Architects singles chronology
"Modern Misery" (2018)	"Animals" (2020)	"Black Lungs" (2020)

Music video
- "Animals" on YouTube

"Animals" is a song by English metalcore band Architects. Produced by the band's drummer Dan Searle and lead guitarist Josh Middleton, it is featured on the group's 2021 ninth studio album For Those That Wish to Exist. The track was released as the lead single from the album on 20 October 2020. It was written by Dan Searle alongside the rest of the band.

A live orchestral version of "Animals" was recorded at Abbey Road Studios in London, being released onto the band's YouTube channel on 26 March 2021 as well as being able to be streamed exclusively on Amazon Music.

== Composition ==
The song has been described by critics as a metalcore and a hard rock song with electronic and industrial influences. The track runs at 95 BPM and is in the key of C-sharp minor. It runs for four minutes and 4 seconds. The song was written by the band as well as being produced by band member Dan Searle who co-produced the song and the album alongside Josh Middleton.

== Music video ==
The video for "Animals" was released on the same day as the song was released on 20 October 2020. It was directed by Dan Searle.

Chris Krovatin of The Pit described the music video as "including flashes of beautiful and inspiring imagery that, while open to interpretation, are none the less devoid of any specific meaning...powerful imagery that at the end of the day is more about inspiration than trying to get across any real message, agenda, or allegiance."

== Personnel ==
Credits adapted from Tidal.

Architects

- Sam Carter – lead vocals, lyricist, composition
- Josh Middleton – lead guitar, backing vocals, lyricist, composition, production
- Adam Christianson – rhythm guitar, backing vocals, lyricist, composition
- Alex "Ali" Dean – bass, keyboards, drum pad, lyricist, composition
- Dan Searle – drums, percussion, programming, lyricist, composition, production

Additional personnel

- Zakk Cervini – mixing

== Charts ==
=== Weekly charts ===
Weekly chart performance for "Animals"
Chart (2020–21)	Peak position
Scotland (OCC)	78
UK Singles Sales (OCC)	76
UK Singles Downloads (OCC)	72
UK Rock & Metal (OCC)	19
US Hot Rock & Alternative Songs (Billboard)	42
US Rock & Alternative Airplay (Billboard)	24

=== Year-end charts ===
Year-end chart performance for "Animals"
Chart (2021)	Position
US Hot Hard Rock Songs (Billboard)	10
US Mainstream Rock (Billboard)	31

== Certifications ==
Certifications for "Animals"
Region	Certification	Certified units/sales
United Kingdom (BPI)	Silver	200,000^{‡}
United States (RIAA)	Gold	500,000^{‡}
^{‡} Sales+streaming figures based on certification alone.
