= Randy Slaugh =

American music producer and composer (born 1987)

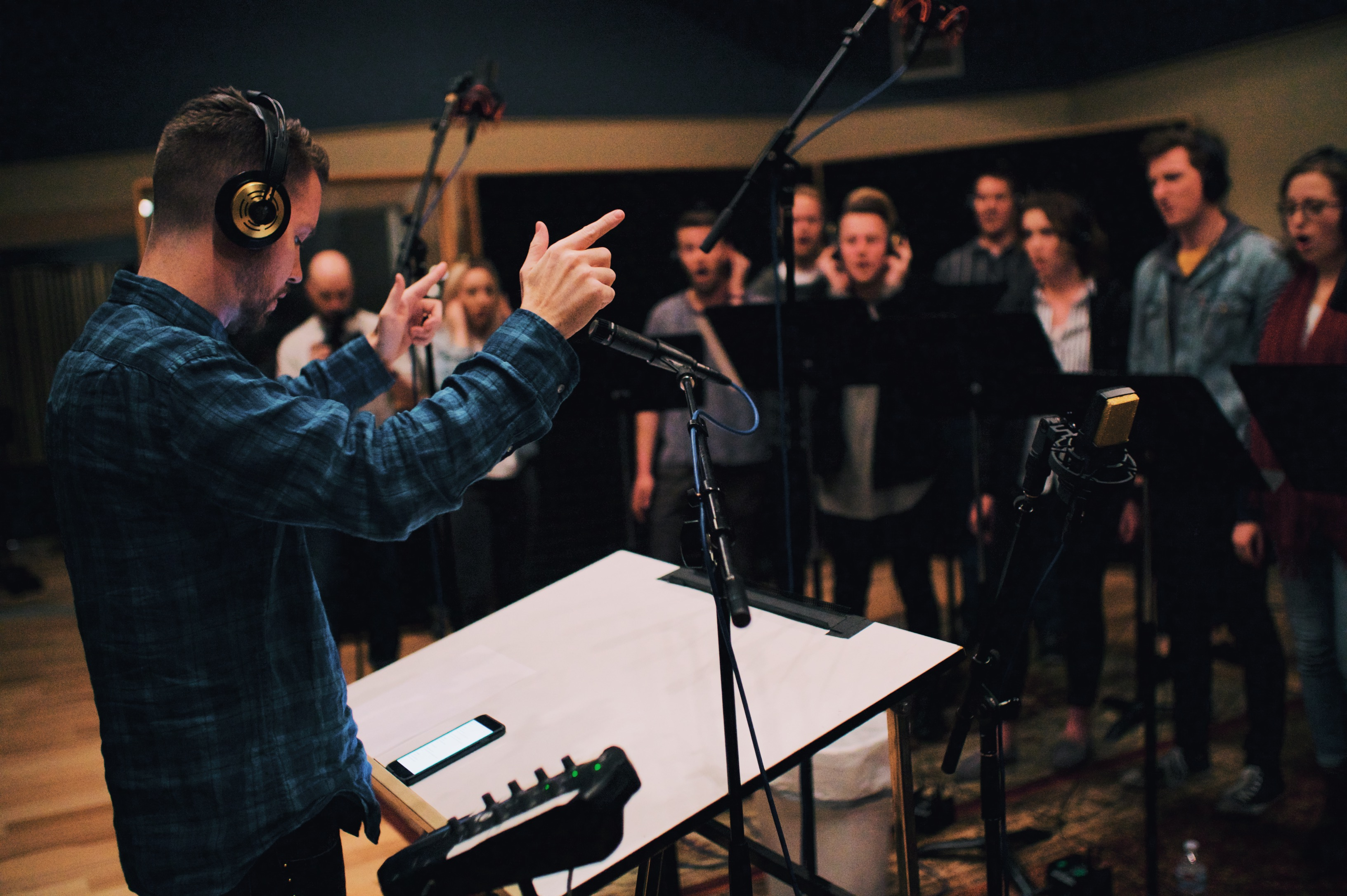
- Randy Slaugh conducting the choir session for TesseracT's Sonder

Background information
- Born: Randall James Slaugh; October 3, 1987 (age 38)
- Origin: Philadelphia, Pennsylvania, U.S.
- Occupations: Music producer, composer, arranger
- Years active: 2010–present
- Website: randyslaugh.com

Randy Slaugh (born October 3, 1987) is an American music producer and composer based in Los Angeles, California. He has worked with artists such as Jelly Roll, Skillet, Sleeping With Sirens, Yelawolf, Architects, The Amity Affliction, Periphery, David Archuleta, TesseracT, Devin Townsend, and Four Year Strong, and is a member of Kscope's cross-continental music group White Moth Black Butterfly. In recent years, he has worked on music for television series on Netflix, CBS, NBC, ABC, Hulu, Discovery, ESPN, VH1, and MTV, for video games such as Free Fire, and for ad campaigns for Bombas, NBA, Levi's, and KMC Wheels. Slaugh is part of the Producers & Engineers Wing Committee for The Recording Academy, and a member of the Sundance Institute, Music Producers Guild, Society of Composers & Lyricists and the Heavy Music Awards.

== Life and career ==
=== Early years ===
Randy Slaugh grew up in the suburb of Philadelphia, Pennsylvania playing music in alternative rock and post-hardcore bands. He began teaching himself audio production and later went on to study communication and advertising in college. While at college, Slaugh connected with audio engineer Ken Dudley and started learning more professional levels of production.

=== 2010–present ===
In 2010, Slaugh connected with the band Periphery at some of their early shows. After hearing a demo of their song "Have a Blast," he reached out to lead guitarist and producer Misha Mansoor, and offered to record real violin and cello to replace the midi strings in the demo. In 2013, Slaugh worked with Misery Signals, who were recording their album Absent Light in Idaho and were looking for more extensive string arrangements to feature on the album. Later that year, he went on to work with I Killed the Prom Queen, Devin Townsend, Architects, We Shot the Moon, and Intervals. In 2015, Slaugh joined progressive pop group White Moth Black Butterfly after working with Daniel Tompkins and Keshav Dhar on Skyharbor's Guiding Lights album the previous year. He co-wrote and co-produced the group's album Atone, as well as their Rising Sun (EP), which were released via Kscope.

Devin Townsend's Z², which Slaugh did orchestration and engineering on, won Metal/Hard Music Album of the Year at the 2015 Juno Awards. Skyharbor's Guiding Lights was named Best Album: Critic's Choice in Rolling Stone's 2015 Metal Awards, and Architects' Lost Forever // Lost Together won Best Album in the Relentless Kerrang Awards. The song "The Price is Wrong" from Periphery's Periphery III: Select Difficulty was nominated for Best Metal Performance at the 2017 Grammy Awards. and Periphery's 2019 release Periphery IV: Hail Stan charted #1 on Billboard's Independent Album, Current Rock Album and Current Hard Music Album charts.

In 2018, Slaugh broke into the TV and film world working on shows such as MTV's Catfish: The TV Show, VH1's Black Ink Crew, TLC's 90 Day Fiancé, Discovery's Diesel Brothers and A&E's Wahlburgers. He has since composed music for television series across several networks, and for movies including Bollywood film The Body and independent crime thriller Locker 42.

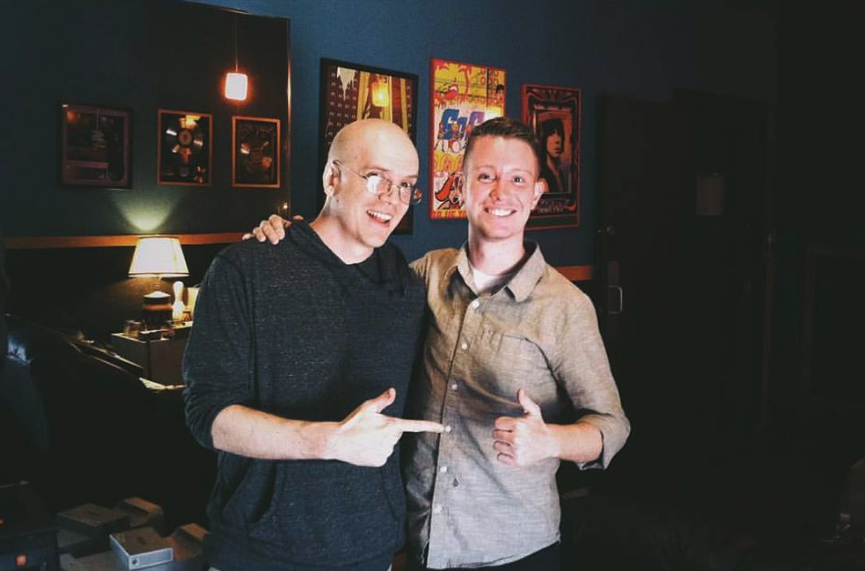
Slaugh at Swing House Studios, Los Angeles, CA working on Z² with Devin Townsend in 2014

== Selected discography ==
Year	Artist	Title	Label	Role
2012	Periphery	Periphery II: This Time It's Personal	Sumerian	Orchestration
2013	Misery Signals	Absent Light	Basick	Orchestration
2014	I Killed the Prom Queen	Beloved	Epitaph	Orchestration
2014	Intervals	A Voice Within	Basick	Orchestration
2014	Architects	Lost Forever // Lost Together	Epitaph	Orchestration
2014	Devin Townsend	Casualties of Cool	HevyDevy	Orchestration
2014	Skyharbor	Guiding Lights	Basick	Orchestration
2014	Devin Townsend Project	Z²	HevyDevy	Orchestration
2016	Architects	All Our Gods Have Abandoned Us	Epitaph	Orchestration
2016	Periphery	Periphery III: Select Difficulty	Sumerian	Orchestration
2017	Thy Art Is Murder	Dear Desolation	Nuclear Blast	Additional production
2017	White Moth Black Butterfly	Atone	Kscope	Producer
2018	TesseracT	Sonder	Kscope	Additional production
2018	Skyharbor	Sunshine Dust	eOne	Orchestration
2018	Silent Planet	When The End Began	Solid State, UNFD	Additional production
2018	Unearth	Extinction(s)	Century Media	Additional production
2019	Periphery	Periphery IV: Hail Stan	3DOT, eOne	Orchestration
2020	Four Year Strong	Brain Pain	Pure Noise	Orchestration
2020	Citizen Soldier	Down the Rabbit Hole	Independent	Producer
2021	Humanity's Last Breath	Välde	Unique Leader	Additional production
2021	White Moth Black Butterfly	The Cost of Dreaming	Kscope	Producer
2021	Caskets	Lost Souls	SharpTone	Additional production
2021	The World Is a Beautiful Place & I Am No Longer Afraid to Die	Illusory Walls	Epitaph	Orchestration
2021	The Amity Affliction	Somewhere Beyond The Blue	Warner, Pure Noise	Additional production
2022	Bury Tomorrow	Death (Ever Colder)	Music For Nations, Sony	Additional production
2022	Sleeping With Sirens	Complete Collapse	Sumerian	Additional production
2022	Loveless	End of an Era	Sony BMG (dist)	Additional production
2022	Of Virtue	Omen	SharpTone	Additional production
2023
2023	Skillet	Dominion: Day Of Destiny (Deluxe Edition)	Atlantic	Additional production
2023	Nothing More	Spirits (Deluxe)	Better Noise	Additional production
2023	The Amity Affliction	Not Without My Ghosts	Warner, Pure Noise	Additional production
2023	TesseracT	War of Being	Kscope	Additional production
2023	Kendall Tucker feat. Jelly Roll	Dragging Me Down	Independent	Additional production
2023	Caskets	Reflections	SharpTone	Additional production
2024
2024	Attack Attack!	Disaster	Oxide	Additional production
2024	The Amity Affliction	Let the Ocean Take Me (Redux)	Warner, Pure Noise	Additional production
2025
2025	Attack Attack!	Attack Attack! II	Oxide	Additional production
2025	Royale Lynn	Black Magic	Epitaph	Additional production
2025	Caskets	The Only Heaven You'll Know	SharpTone	Additional production
2025	The Amity Affliction	All That I Remember	Pure Noise	Additional production
2025	Set It Off	Set It Off	Independent	Additional production
2026
2026	Story of the Year	A.R.S.O.N.	SharpTone	Additional production
2026	Shi Eubank feat. Yelawolf	Paper Planes	Independent	Additional production
2026	The Amity Affliction	House of Cards	Pure Noise	Additional production

== Television ==
Year	Title	Network	Role
2015	World Series of Fighting 24: Fitch vs. Okami	NBC Sports	Composer: additional music (1 episode)
2016	Teen Mom	MTV	Composer: additional music (5 episodes)
2018	Catfish: The TV Show	MTV	Composer: additional music (4 episodes)
2018	Diesel Brothers	Discovery	Composer: additional music (5 episodes)
2018	Wahlburgers	A&E	Composer: additional music (7 episodes)
2018	Black Ink Crew: Chicago	VH1	Composer: additional music (10 episodes)
2018	Basketball Wives	VH1	Composer: additional music (4 episodes)
2018	90 Day Fiancé	TLC	Composer: additional music (13 episodes)
2019	Bridezillas	WE TV	Composer: additional music (1 episode)
2019	Cartel Crew	VH1	Composer: additional music (6 episodes)
2019	90 Day Fiancé	TLC	Composer: additional music (4 episodes)
2019	Chopped	Food Network	Composer: additional music (1 episode)
2019	Very Cavallari	E!	Composer (3 episodes)
2019	The Dude Perfect Show	Nickelodeon	Composer: additional music (2 episodes)
2019	The Real Housewives of Atlanta	Bravo	Composer: additional music (3 episodes)
2019	Project Runway	Bravo	Composer: additional music (2 episodes)
2019	The Challenge	MTV	Composer: additional music (1 episode)
2019	Magic for Humans	Netflix	Composer: additional music (1 episode)
2020	Undercover Boss	CBS	Composer (3 episodes)
2020	Royal Rumble	WWE	Composer: additional music (1 episode)
2020	Shark Week	Discovery	Composer: additional music (1 episode)
2020	90 Day Fiancé	TLC	Composer: additional music (1 episode)
2020	Million Dollar Listing Los Angeles	Bravo	Composer: additional music (1 episode)
2021	Mayans M.C.	FX	Composer: additional music (3 episodes)
2021	NCIS: Los Angeles	CBS	Composer: additional music (1 episode)
2021	Catfish: The TV Show	MTV	Composer (4 episodes)
2021	Jackass Shark Week	Discovery	Composer: additional music
2021	The Real Housewives of Atlanta	Bravo	Composer (3 episodes)
2022	The Rookie	ABC	Composer: additional music (1 episode)
2022	Undercover Boss	CBS	Composer (5 episodes)
2022	Property Brothers	HGTV	Composer: additional music (1 episode)
2023	Jubilee	Amazon Prime	Composer: additional music (10 episode)
2023	LA Fire and Rescue	NBC	Composer

== Film ==
Year	Title	Production company	Role
2019	The Body	Viacom 18	Session producer, string arrangements, engineering
2022	No Rain Nor Dew	Independent	Composer
Pre-production	Locker 42	Vigilant Entertainment	Composer

== Video games ==
Year	Title	Software Company	Role
2020	Free Fire	Garena	Composer: additional music
2020	Whiffle Blasters	Suckerbird / Epic	Composer: additional music
2025	War of Being	DMTesseracT	Composer
