= Steadyfire =

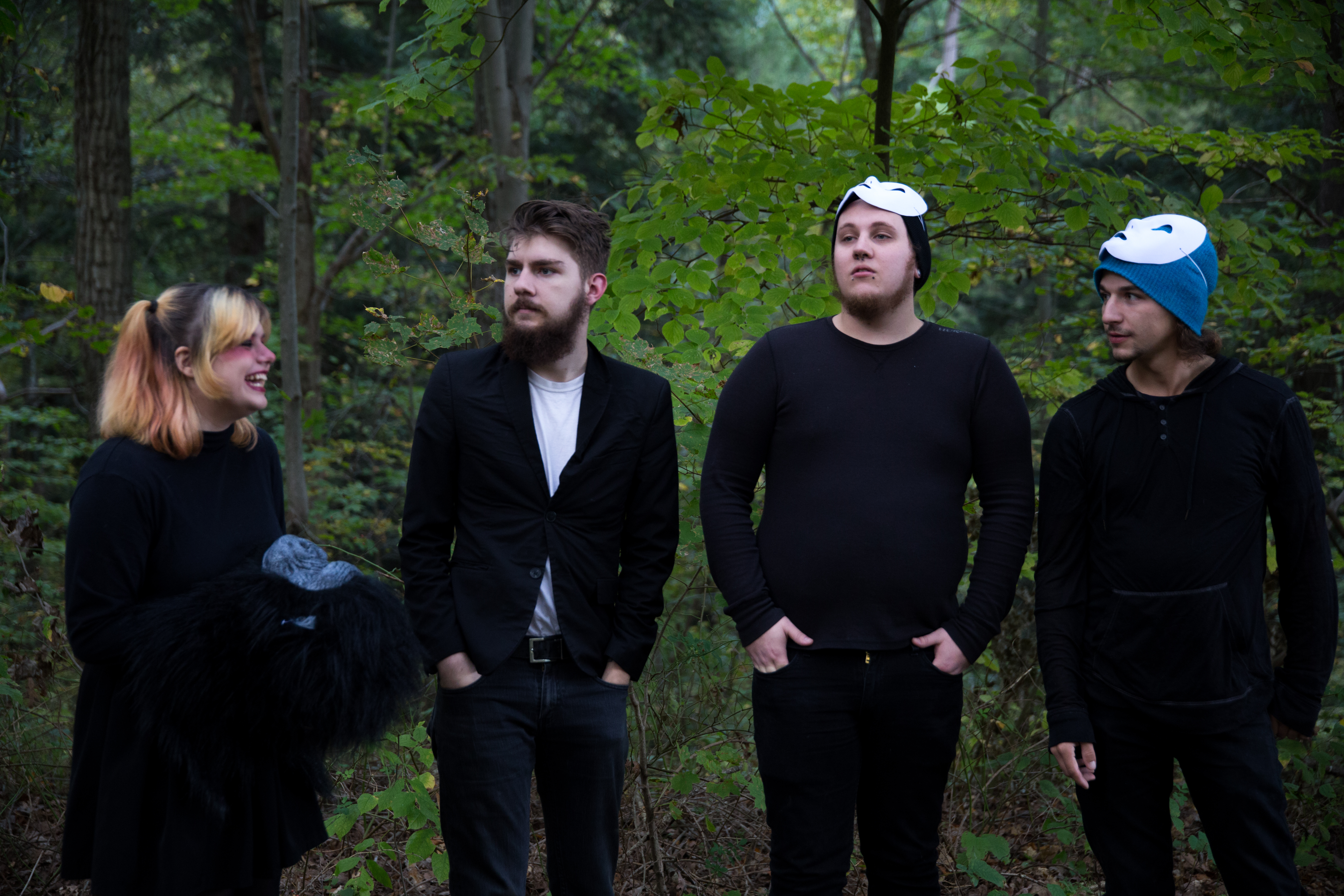
- Band members in late 2018

Background information
- Origin: Perrysville, Ohio
- Genres: Indie rock; emo; alternative rock
- Years active: 2014–2019
- Label: Modest Aeroplane Records
- Past members: Gavin McIntire; Garrett Pavlansky; Jade Marié; Nick Billinghurst; Jeff Corbin; Grant Cowell†
- Website: steadyfireband.com

Steadyfire was an American indie rock band based in Perrysville, Ohio, formed in 2014 by guitarist-vocalist Gavin McIntire, bassist Jeff Corbin, and drummer Grant Cowell. The group was briefly composed of McIntire, bassist Garrett Pavlansky, synth player Jade Marié, and drummer Nick Billinghurst before McIntire, Pavlansky, and Marié opted to form Noise Beneath the Floor in 2020.

The band's music was featured on Rover's Morning Glory in 2015, leading to their addition to the festival Rover Fest alongside late Stone Temple Pilots vocalist Scott Weiland.

Steadyfire released one extended play, Steadyfire (2015), and a demo album, How Often Have I Been This Wrong?, which was released on January 4, 2019. They released two singles in 2016 produced by Skyharbor singer and Grammy nominated engineer Eric Emery. They were signed to independent record label Modest Aeroplane Records, which is owned and operated by band members Gavin McIntire and Jade Marié.

On September 20, 2019, the band made a post to their facebook page announcing that the group had disbanded and would be succeeded by a new project.

Founding drummer Grant Cowell died on April 19, 2023. In the following days the band announced they would be using his previously recorded drum takes to finish an abandoned album first started in 2015.

== Musical style ==
Steadyfire is typically described as an alternative rock band Vocalist Gavin McIntire has listed a number of acts as influences including Brand New (band), The World Is A Beautiful Place & I Am No Longer Afraid To Die, David Bowie, The Hotelier, Manchester Orchestra, Weezer, Modest Mouse, and Explosions in the Sky.

== Band members ==
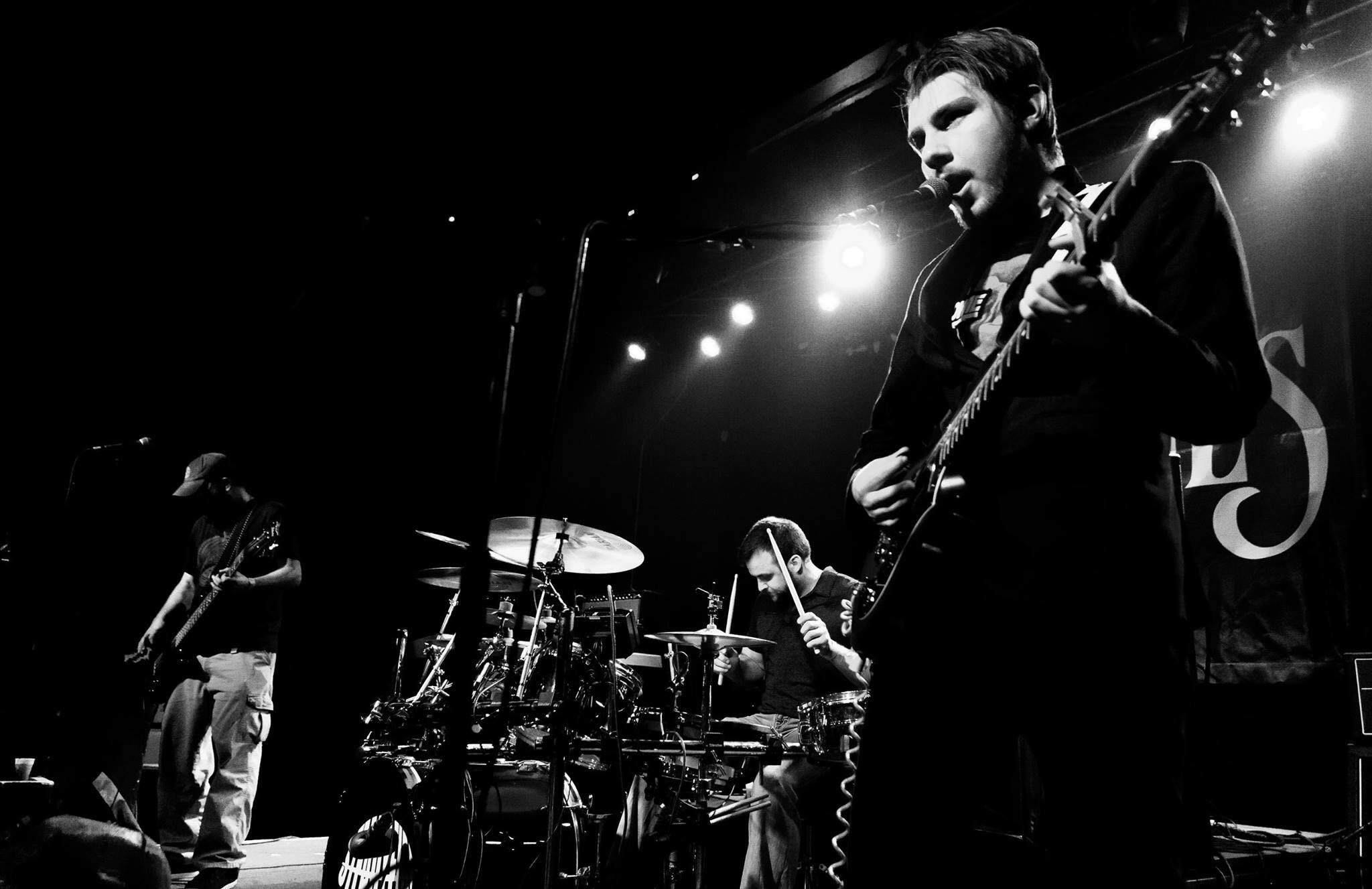
American indie rock band Steadyfire live at the Cleveland Agora in 2016

=== Former members ===
- Gavin McIntire – vocals, guitar (2014–2019) piano, synth (2018–2019)
- Garrett Pavlansky – bass, backing vocals (2018–2019)
- Jade Marié – synth, backing vocals (2018–2019)
- Nick Billinghurst – drums, percussion (2018–2019)
- Jeff Corbin – bass, keyboards (2014–2017)
- Grant Cowell†- drums (2014–2018)

== Discography ==
Studio albums

- How Often Have I Been This Wrong? (2019)

EPs

- Steadyfire (2015)

Singles

- Different (2015)
- Skeleton (2016)
- (Every Time I Do) I Die (2016)
- Your Father the Captain (2018)
- 1967 (2018)
- Even If We're The Same (2018)
- In Between (2019)

Demos

- Reference (2014)

== Videography ==
Music videos

- (Every Time I Do) I Die (2016)
- Skeleton (2017)
- Your Father the Captain (2018)
- 1967 (2018)
- Even If We're The Same (2018)
