= Lost Forever =

Lost Forever may refer to:

- Lost Forever // Lost Together, a 2014 album by Architects
- "Lost Forever", a song by Travis Scott from his 2023 album Utopia
