= White Moth Black Butterfly =

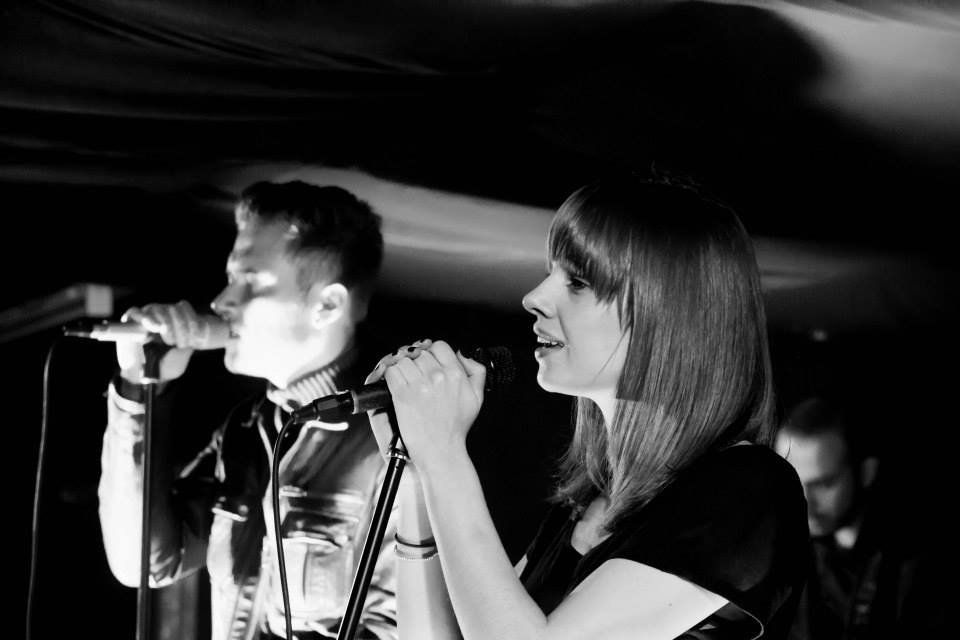

Background information
- Origin: Nottinghamshire, England
- Genres: Progressive pop, alternative
- Years active: 2013–present
- Label: Kscope
- Members: Daniel Tompkins; Keshav Dhar; Randy Slaugh; Jordan Bethany (Turner); Mac Christensen
- Website: Official site

White Moth Black Butterfly is a British/Indian/American cross-continental progressive pop project with members from Nottinghamshire, UK, New Delhi, India, and Salt Lake City, Utah, US. The group consists of TesseracT lead singer Daniel Tompkins, Skyharbor guitarist Keshav Dhar, as well as Randy Slaugh (keyboards/orchestrations), Jordan Bethany (vocals), and Mac Christensen (production and drums).

== Formation and One Thousand Wings (2013–2014) ==
White Moth Black Butterfly initially began as a solo project and experimental creative outlet for singer Daniel Tompkins, who was the frontman for TesseracT at the time. After parting ways with TesseracT, he connected with guitarist and producer Keshav Dhar and asked Keshav to help produce and mix the solo tracks he had been working on. He connected with singer/songwriter Jordan Bethany at a local church in the U.K. and asked her to guest on a few songs as well. With the help of Dhar, Bethany and others including Acle Kahney from TesseracT contributing production as well, Tompkins self-released White Moth Black Butterfly's debut album One Thousand Wings.

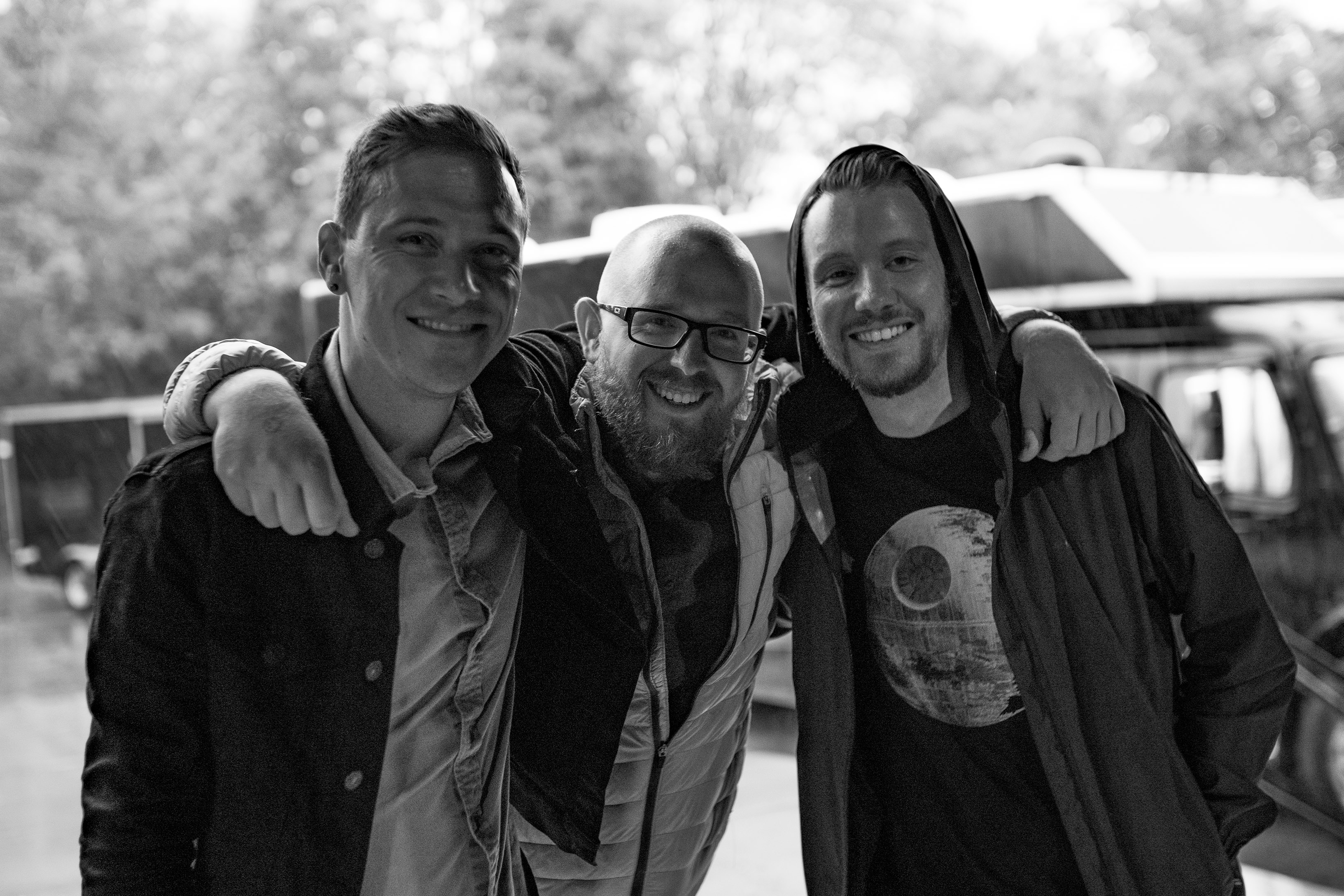
(left to right) Singer Daniel Tompkins, drummer Mac Christensen, and keyboardist Randy Slaugh

== New lineup, Kscope and Atone (2015–present) ==
After the release of One Thousand Wings, Daniel began working on new music with Keshav and again asked singer Jordan Bethany to get involved. The three produced the single "Rising Sun", and decided to have both Dhar and Bethany join as permanent members of the project. The band connected with string arranger and producer Randy Slaugh while working on Skyharbor's album Guiding Lights and asked him if he would be interested in getting involved as well to contribute production, songwriting, and real instrumentation, in contrast to the more digital sound of One Thousand Wings. The four of them collaborated entirely long-distance through file sharing to create a 12-track album, including a rework of the previously released single "Rising Sun". In the final production stages of the album, Randy recruited friend and longtime collaborator Mac Christensen to perform live drums on the album. Dan then reached out to Mac to see if he would be interested in joining the project as a full-time member.

The band pitched the album they had recorded to Kscope Records, who Daniel was connected with through TesseracT. The label loved what they heard, signed the band, and released White Moth's sophomore album Atone, which was met with critical acclaim. The band has since released music videos for "Tempest" and "Evelyn", in addition to the previously released video for "Rising Sun". The video for "Evelyn" was nominated for 2018's Progressive Music Awards.

The band released their third album, The Cost of Dreaming, on 28 May 2021. Tompkins describes the album as "an outpouring of love and a cry for help". The band has released a video for their single "The Dreamer", from that album.

== Musical style and influences ==
White Moth Black Butterfly has been described as contemporary pop, art pop, alternative, pop rock, experimental, progressive pop, electronica and trip hop. According to lead singer Daniel Tompkins, the band have been influenced by artists like Massive Attack, Enigma, Sigur Ros, David Bowie, Michael Jackson, Tool, Dredg and Thrice.

== Awards and nominations ==
Year	Nominee / work	Award	Result
2014	One Thousand Wings	Progressive Music Award for Limelight category	Nominated
2018	Evelyn	Progressive Music Award for Video of the Year	Nominated

== Members ==
- Daniel Tompkins – lead vocals, programming (2013–present)
- Jordan Bethany – lead vocals (2013–present)
- Keshav Dhar – guitars, programming (2013–present)
- Randy Slaugh – keyboards, orchestrations, programming, production (2015–present)
- Mac Christensen – production, programming, drums and percussion (2017–present)

== Discography ==
=== Albums ===
- One Thousand Wings (November 11, 2013)
- Atone (Kscope, September 1, 2017)
- The Cost of Dreaming (May 28, 2021)

=== EPs ===
- Rising Sun (Kscope, October 5, 2018)

=== Singles ===
- "Certainty" (2013)
- "The World Won't Sleep" (2013)
- "Omen" (2013)
- "Rising Sun" (2014)
- "The Serpent" (2017)
- "Tempest" (2017)
- "Evelyn" (2017)
- "An Ocean Away" (2018)
- "The Dreamer" (2021)

== Videography ==
- "Certainty" (2013)
- "The World Won't Sleep" (2013)
- "Omen" (2013)
- "Rising Sun" (2014)
- "The Serpent" (2017)
- "Tempest" (2017)
- "Evelyn" (2017)
- "Rising Sun (Remix)" (2018)
- "An Ocean Away" (2018)
- "Atone (Making the Album documentary)" (2018)
- "The Dreamer" (2021)
- "Soma" (2021)
