= Black Magic (Royale Lynn album) =

Studio album by Royale Lynn
- Released: June 27, 2025
- Genre: Alternative metal
- Length: 34:11
- Label: Epitaph
- Producer: Jonathan Roach

Singles from Black Magic
- 1. "Death Wish" Released: May 9, 2024; 2. "Sacrifice" Released: September 18, 2024; 3. "Battleground" Released: February 21, 2025; 4. "Greed" Released: April 16, 2025

Black Magic is the debut studio album by Canadian hard rock artist Royale Lynn. It was released on June 27, 2025, via Epitaph Records. The album features singles that were previously released, including "Death Wish", "Sacrifice", "Battleground", and "Greed".

== Background ==
The album, produced by Jonathan Roach, centers on the theme of Lynn's mental health struggles. It consists of twelve songs ranging between two and three minutes each with a total runtime of approximately thirty-four minutes. English singer Danny Warsnop is featured on the eleventh track, "Death Wish". Blabbermouth described the project using Pandora's box as an example, stating that "each song on the record represents an 'evil' that escaped Pandora's box into humanity."

"Death Wish" was released as a single on May 9, 2024. It was followed by "Sacrifice" on September 18, 2024, and "Battleground" on February 21, 2025. The fourth single, "Greed", was released on April 16, 2025. It was described as an alternative metal song, released alongside a music video directed by Scott Hansen.

== Reception ==
Professional ratings
Review scores
Source	Rating
Distorted Sound	7/10 stars
Kerrang!	3/5 stars
Metal Hammer	5/10 stars

Distorted Sound, rating the album seven out of ten, remarked "Her diverse CV suggests an artist who has persevered in order to be heard, and so on her debut record, it is fitting her words and her hooks take centre stage."

Kerrang! described it as "a singular effort that offers a firm but safe footing in the world of an artist announcing herself to the world," giving it a rating of three out of five.

Emily Swingle of Metal Hammer rated the album five out of ten and noted, "This record is a rebrand that barely understands the scene – much like when Lynn rebranded as 'punktry', despite never sounding punk."

== Track listing ==
No.	Title	Writer(s)	Length
1.	"Greed"	Royale Lynn; Luke Healy; Cody Quistad	2:50
2.	"E.V.I.L."	Lynn; Andrew Baylis; Andrew Capra; Dan Pellarin	3:32
3.	"Black Magic"	Lynn; Matty Mullins; Quistad	3:07
4.	"Sacrifice"	Lynn; Jonathan Roach; Sam Tinnesz	2:40
5.	"Pandora's Box"	Lynn; Curtis Peoples; Dan Swank; Tinnesz; Cameron Walker	2:42
6.	"Dragon"	Lynn; Baylis; Michael Whitworth	2:48
7.	"When We Die"	Lynn; Jesse Denaro; Healy	2:59
8.	"Wtch"	Lynn; Baylis; Quistad; Whitworth	2:59
9.	"Dark Mode"	Lynn; Joey Barba; Eddie Eberle; Cole Miracle	2:37
10.	"Inside Out"	Lynn; Jake Rose; Tinnesz	2:58
11.	"Death Wish" (featuring Danny Worsnop)	Lynn; Miracle; Quistad; Danny Worsnop	2:25
12.	"Battleground"	Lynn; Josh Gilbert	3:14
Total length:			34:11

== Personnel ==
Credits adapted from Tidal.

=== Musicians ===
- Royale Lynn – vocals
- Randy Slaugh – programming (all tracks), keyboards (tracks 1–9)
- Grady Saxman – drums (1–9, 12)
- Brad Wagner – guitar (1–9, 12)
- Nathan Keeterle – bass, guitar (10)
- Casey Sabol – background vocals (10)
- Jerry Roe – drums (10)
- Andrew Baylis – programming (10)
- Cody Quistad – guitar (11)
- Danny Worsnop – vocals (11)

=== Technical ===
- Jonathan Roach – production, mixing (1–9, 11, 12)
- Andrew Baylis – production, engineering (10)
- Cody Quistad – co-production (11)
- Josh Wilbur – mixing (10)
- Seth Munson – mastering (1–9, 11, 12)
- Ted Jensen – mastering (10)
- Aidan Thompson – engineering (1–9, 11, 12)
- Lucas Gienow – editing (1–9, 11, 12)
- Casey Sabol – editing (10)
- Cole Clark – editing (10)
