= Atone (album) =

Studio album by White Moth Black Butterfly
- Released: 1 September 2017
- Recorded: 2015–2017
- Genre: Progressive pop; alternative
- Length: 37:48
- Label: Kscope
- Producer: Randy Slaugh; Keshav Dhar; Daniel Tompkins

White Moth Black Butterfly chronology
One Thousand Wings (2013)	Atone (2017)	Rising Sun (EP) (2018)

Professional ratings
Review scores
Source	Rating
Classic Rock Magazine	4/5 stars
Sputnik Music	8/10 stars
AllMusic	4/5 stars

Atone is the second studio album by the progressive pop group White Moth Black Butterfly, made up of Daniel Tompkins of TesseracT, Keshav Dhar of Skyharbor, Randy Slaugh, Jordan Bethany and Mac Christensen. It was released through Kscope Records on 1 September 2017. The album was recorded in several locations in the UK, India, the US, and Taiwan.

== Track listing ==
No.	Title	Length
1.	"I: Incarnate"	1:51
2.	"Rising Sun"	3:28
3.	"Tempest"	4:13
4.	"An Ocean Away"	2:58
5.	"Symmetry"	3:06
6.	"II: Penitence"	3:16
7.	"The Sage"	3:41
8.	"The Serpent"	3:56
9.	"Atone"	3:21
10.	"III: Deep Earth"	3:15
11.	"Evelyn"	4:43
Total length:		37:48

Expanded Edition
No.	Title	Length
12.	"Rising Sun (WMBB Remix)"	4:07
13.	"An Ocean Away (feat. Pat Cunningham) [Acoustic]"	3:58
14.	"Rising Sun (feat. Pat Cunningham) [Acoustic]"	3:16
15.	"Tempest (feat. Jon Gomm) [Jon Gomm Rework]"	3:43
Total length:		52:52

== Personnel ==
=== White Moth Black Butterfly ===
- Daniel Tompkins – lead vocals
- Keshav Dhar – guitar, programming
- Randy Slaugh – keyboard, orchestration, programming
- Jordan Bethany – lead vocals
- Mac Christensen – drums, percussion
