= Lost Forever // Lost Together =

Studio album by Architects
- Released: 11 March 2014
- Recorded: Studio Fredman, Gothenburg, Sweden
- Genre: Metalcore
- Length: 43:26
- Label: Epitaph; UNFD; New Damage
- Producer: Henrik Udd; Fredrik Nordström; Randy Slaugh

Architects studio album chronology
Daybreaker (2012)	Lost Forever // Lost Together (2014)	All Our Gods Have Abandoned Us (2016)

Singles from Lost Forever // Lost Together
- 1. "Naysayer" Released: 14 January 2014; 2. "Broken Cross" Released: 10 February 2014; 3. "Colony Collapse" Released: 29 September 2014

Lost Forever // Lost Together is the sixth studio album by English metalcore band Architects. It was released on 11 March 2014 globally through Epitaph Records; with the exception of UNFD in Australia and New Damage in Canada.

Lost Forever // Lost Together was recorded at Swedish recording studio Studio Fredman with producers Henrik Udd and Fredrik Nordström. They were chosen because of Architects' admiration for the production work Nordström and Udd had done with other metal bands like Bring Me the Horizon and At the Gates. In a conscious decision to not mimic the bluntly political themes of Daybreaker, Architects lyricist Tom Searle wrote about his experiences with cancer, though he still looked at the themes of environmentalism, religious extremism and current affairs. Musically, the band put more focus on post-rock influenced spacey elements with the use of electronics and orchestration.

Upon its release, Lost Forever // Lost Together received generally positive reviews from critics, achieving an aggregated 79/100 on Metacritic, based on six reviews. The album also charted in six countries' mainstream album charts, four of which it achieved places within the top 40. The band has released two singles in promotion for the record, "Naysayer" and "Broken Cross", with the former debuting at number 3 on the UK Rock Chart, and have also released a music video for "Gravedigger". The band has also promoted the album through shows in Europe, North America and Australasia.

== Background ==
With the recording of Lost Forever // Lost Together, the band hoped to "once and for all" distance themselves from the "car crash" that was their 2011 album The Here and Now. The music featured on The Here and Now was a drastic sonic change from their 2009 third album Hollow Crown's "technical metalcore", not only due to the band trying not to produce the same album again, but also due to the influence of the softer, more melodic music they were listening to at the time. The band members have treated the three-year period between 2011 and 2014 as one of discovery of the band's identity and values. There had been a strong negative backlash to the sound of The Here and Now within their fanbase and the music scene, and this negativity started to have an effect on the members. Vocalist Sam Carter noted how he was going to pubs alone and drinking heavily, and this led to the rest of the band giving him an intervention. Carter had also noted how their live shows were not as good as they used to be; now incorporating The Here and Now's ballads, they felt the shows had become less violent and intense. However, with the success of 2012's Daybreaker, the band felt they had more excitement for playing heavy music again, as Daybreaker saw a shift back to their original sound.

In 2012, during the band's 'Almost World Tour' guitarist Tom Searle noticed what he perceived to be a mole on his leg which irritated him. He proceeded to have it examined, where it was cleared as non-cancerous and removed at the end of the tour once returning home. However, a few weeks after its removal, Searle was contacted by doctors as having Melanoma skin cancer, which would eventually lead to his death in 2016. (Note: This led to the band to stop plans of shooting a music video for 'Black Blood' from the Daybreaker re-issue.).

In 2013, the band left their old record label Century Media Records and decided to release a documentary about their tour experiences, One Hundred Days: The Story of Architects Almost World Tour, through a crowd-funding campaign on indiegogo. The campaign was a success and achieved £10,000 above their target of £30,000. All these experiences with Cancer, the world tour and the success of their documentary had a greatly positive effect on the band members and grew grateful for their achieved level.

Later on in the year it was announced that the band had established record deals with Epitaph Records in the United States and Europe, UNFD in Australia and New Damage Records. After their split from Century Media, the band told their management that they were only interested in signing to Epitaph and none others, due to having bands that they look up to, like Every Time I Die and Converge.

== Writing and recording ==
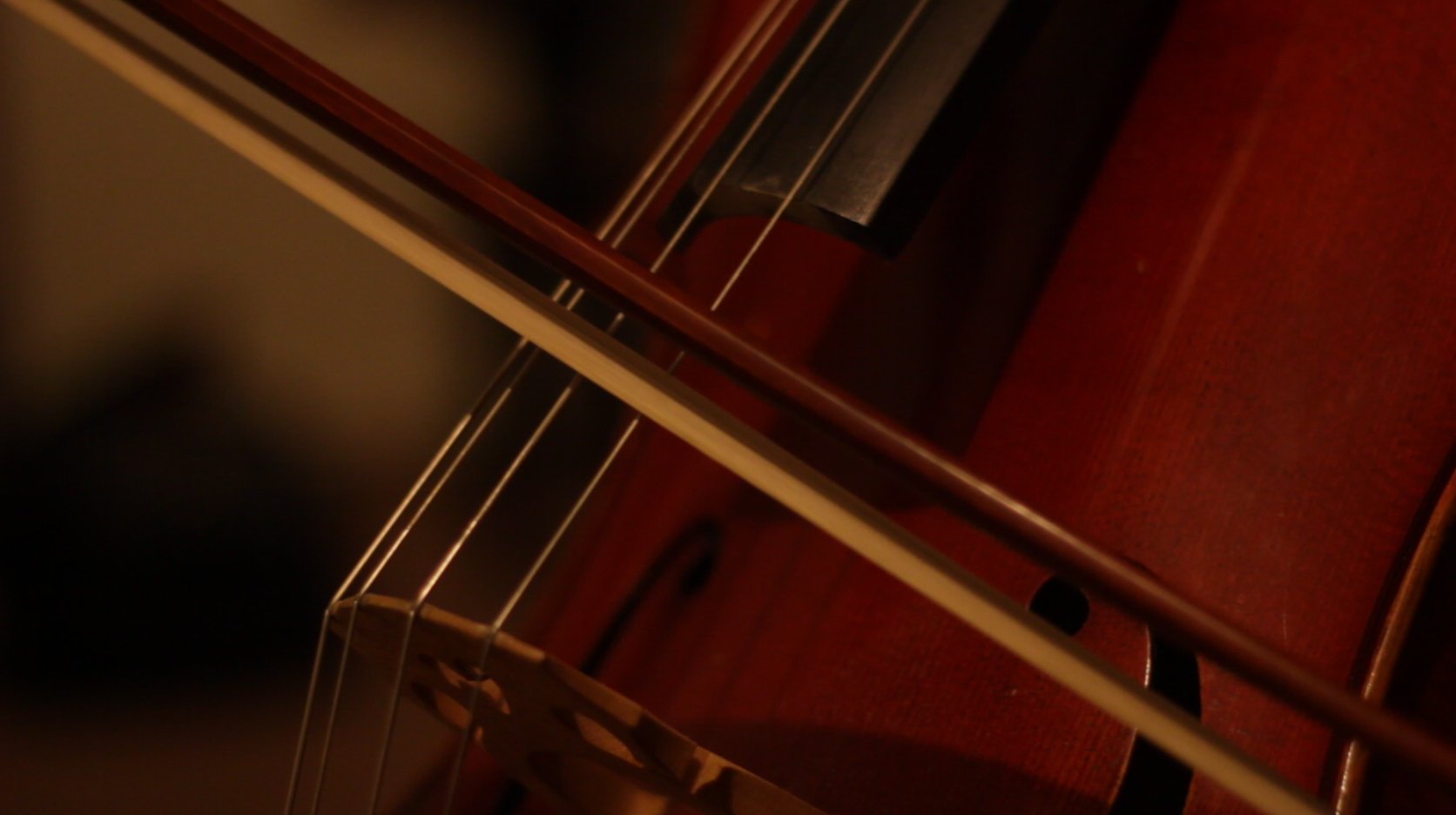
The band worked with producer/arranger Randy Slaugh to add real string arrangements to the record.

The earliest stage of the album's development was when Architects wrote a song whilst on tour with Callejon and August Burns Red in Europe in the Summer 2013. During a show in Gothenburg Swedish producer Henrik Udd approached the band offering to produce their next record.

Much like Daybreaker's lyrics, they were written in a collaboration between Carter and Tom Searle. However, Lost Forever // Lost Together drifts from Daybreaker's strong political focus as the band wished to not sound like a "broken record". Instead they focused on big picture themes which people could relate to far more. Carter let Searle have far more creative control over the direction of the lyrics as Carter felt creatively restricted to love songs, while greatly appreciating Tom's lyricisms. Before starting the recording process, the band put a lot of pre-production focus onto Sam Carter's vocals, in order for them to be at their best for the full studio recordings. They did this by borrowing a microphone from their practice space and putting it in brothers Tom and Dan Searle's home and go through the songs. Before entering the studio with Swedish producers Udd and Fredrik Nordström the band had all of the instrumentation of the song written and prepared, with vocalist Carter saying "it was easily the most prepared we've been".

The band picked Udd and Nordström because of their admiration for his production on records from Bring Me the Horizon, In Flames and At the Gates. Carter was more specific for how "massive [Bring Me the Horizon's] records sound". The album was recorded at Studio Fredman, in the outskirts of Gothenburg, Sweden, an area described as a drab industrial estate. Architects' guitarist Tom Searle described the setting as "driving them loopy" with the lack of activities and distractions at hand. However, noted benefits to its location as they could work late into the night without any issues. Henrik Udd was the primary personnel on the record acting as producer, engineer and mixer, while Johan Henriksson was the assistant engineer. Progress on recording the record was done in between their two tours of North America; June to August as part of the Warped Tour 2013 touring festival and their co-headline tour with Protest the Hero in November and December.

They started the recording process with the drums, then they mixed between guitars, then bass, and then vocals. During the production of the record the band wished to add real classical stringed instruments rather than synthesized to give them a more textured and authentic sound. They came into contact with producer and string arranger Randy Slaugh in the United States whom they sent their composition notes and then he recorded the music with his own arrangement of eight musicians and sent it back.

Carter summarised the band's work on the record by saying it was the hardest they've ever worked on a record, so much so that even Udd commented on how hard they pushed themselves. Through that Carter expressed "I'm really excited in a way that I haven't been since '09s Hollow Crown." All mixing and mastering for the album was completed by January 2014. And leading up to its release both Carter and Tom Searle were very confident.

== Composition ==
=== Style ===
Dead Man Talking
Track 5 deals with the persecution of whistleblowers, especially in reference to Edward Snowden.

The opening song, "Gravedigger", is characterised by energetic breakdowns, tight rhythmic interplay and a "call-to-arms chorus". The song was written after Tom Searle's guitar was accidentally knocked out of tune and he liked the sound that was produced. Lyrically, "Gravedigger" is about the illusion of choice created by some politicians, where people voting for promised positive change are being deceived. Track 2 and the lead single of Lost Forever // Lost Together, "Naysayer", is a statement to critics of the band, saying "this [is] who we are, this is what we want to be and this is who we're going to be." The song has been described as a "blistering" anthem, and one of the heaviest songs on the album and of the band's entire career. During the writing of the "Naysayer", Tom Searle felt it came across with a nu metal vibe.

Track 3, "Broken Cross", has been described as having an epic scope, characterised by ambient electronics and "minor-key moodiness"; when the band wrote it, they wanted it to "feel like you were in space when you're hearing it". Shortly after the song was released as a single, lyricist Tom Searle published a blog post explaining that the lyrics aren't meant to be an assault on religion itself, but rather on religious fundamentalism and the idea of a hateful God. Track 4, "The Devil Is Near", is an environmental statement focusing on the marine conservation charity Sea Shepard, while track 5, "Dead Man Talking", deals with how whistleblowers are persecuted in spite of the public commending their actions.

Colony Collapse
Track 8 opens with a single violin theme and demonstrates "intricate complexity within... epic, melodic soundscapes".

The 6th song, "Red Hypergiant", is an instrumental track – named after the biggest known star in the universe – which uses a sample from a Carl Sagan film and is based around a slow guitar solo, providing a mid-album respite followed by the aggressive track 7, "C.A.N.C.E.R". "C.A.N.C.E.R" was written by Tom Searle after he found out he had a melanoma growth on his leg. Track 8, "Colony Collapse" is about the 2011 Fukushima Daiichi nuclear disaster (whilst also referencing the 1986 Chernobyl disaster) and focuses on the Japanese government's possible attempts to cover up some of the information concerning it. Described as an "Architects' style ballad" by the band, it quickly became a personal favourite of some of the members due to its unique sound over the other tracks. On the other hand, track 9, "Castles in the Air", explores a personal theme of the anxiety associated with being a band.

While the record lacks any actual ballads, Adam Rees of Metal Hammer noted that the final two tracks, "Youth Is Wasted on the Young" and "The Distant Blue", provide a brooding closing to the album. Track 10, "Youth Is Wasted on the Young" is a song about not taking what you have for granted, growing up and facing the future; it opens up and slows down in the middle, where Murray Macleod of The Xcerts appears on guest vocals, and then closes with a slow and heavy approach contrasting with the fast pace of its introduction. The 11th and final song of the album, "The Distant Blue", has been described as possessing "spacey ethereality [sic]" mirroring the "spacey" [sic] sound of "Broken Cross", and focuses lyrically on looking back from the distant future on mankind "messing up" on Earth. Its melody-spiked hardcore style with intricate arrangements was influenced by post-rock bands Sigur Rós and This Will Destroy You.

=== Themes ===
[...] there's only a certain amount of change that can happen through moaning. One person speaking out can be powerful, because it can open up a conversation and I do think that one day we'll wake up and start sorting this mess out.

— Sam Carter in an interview in 2014.

Throughout most of the interviews leading up to the record's release, the band said they considered it to be the heaviest record in their six album career. Since 2012- during the promotion of Daybreaker- questioning to how the record would sound the band always had plans for the record to sound heavy, however Tom Searle commented that they wanted a "Architects way of doing heavy". Incorporating heavier elements like blastbeats, a previously uncommon addition. When asked about the sound of the album Sam Carter said, "It's got a real end-of-the-world sound in places, but in an intelligent way I think.", and also noted its diversity and possessing elements which are "really groovy and bouncy and catchy as well." Though Lost Forever // Lost Together is primarily cited as a metalcore album, it "weaves in ambient elements that sometimes verge on gauzy and dreamlike". The album has also been seen as borrowing sensibilities from melodic hardcore and their earlier technical metalcore sound. Bradley Zorgdrager compared their sound to that of Northlane, Thrice and Bring Me the Horizon as they incorporate post-rock elements into their sound.

When writing the lyrics Tom Searle focused on "really basic stuff we all feel"; ranging from world issues, his own personal experiences with cancer, being scared of growing up and injustices "we see all the time".

The album's title Lost Forever // Lost Together is derived from the lyrics of the "Youth Is Wasted on the Young", Tom Searle has stated it is because "we're all lost. Everyone's just trying to find their place, and hopefully we'll all get there eventually."

== Release and promotion ==
The band had given illusive responses to the album's release date, initially tentatively marking it to be released in early 2014, then later announced it to be released in time for their March 2014 tour. The album was released through Epitaph Records in the United States and Europe on 11 March, through UNFD in Australia and through New Damage Records in Canada. On 27 February, the band uploaded the entire album to listen to on YouTube.

The first single from Lost Forever // Lost Together was "Naysayer". On its first week of its release it appeared at number 3 on the UK Rock Chart number 26 on the UK Independent Chart and became the second-biggest viral song in Britain as it trended on Twitter in three different guises. To further contribute to the success of "Naysayer", BBC Radio DJ Zane Lowe put the track on his evening podcast slot. On 10 February Architects released the second single, "Broken Cross". On 10 June 2014, a music video for "Gravedigger" was released. The third single "Colony Collapse" was released on 29 September.

=== Tour and performances ===
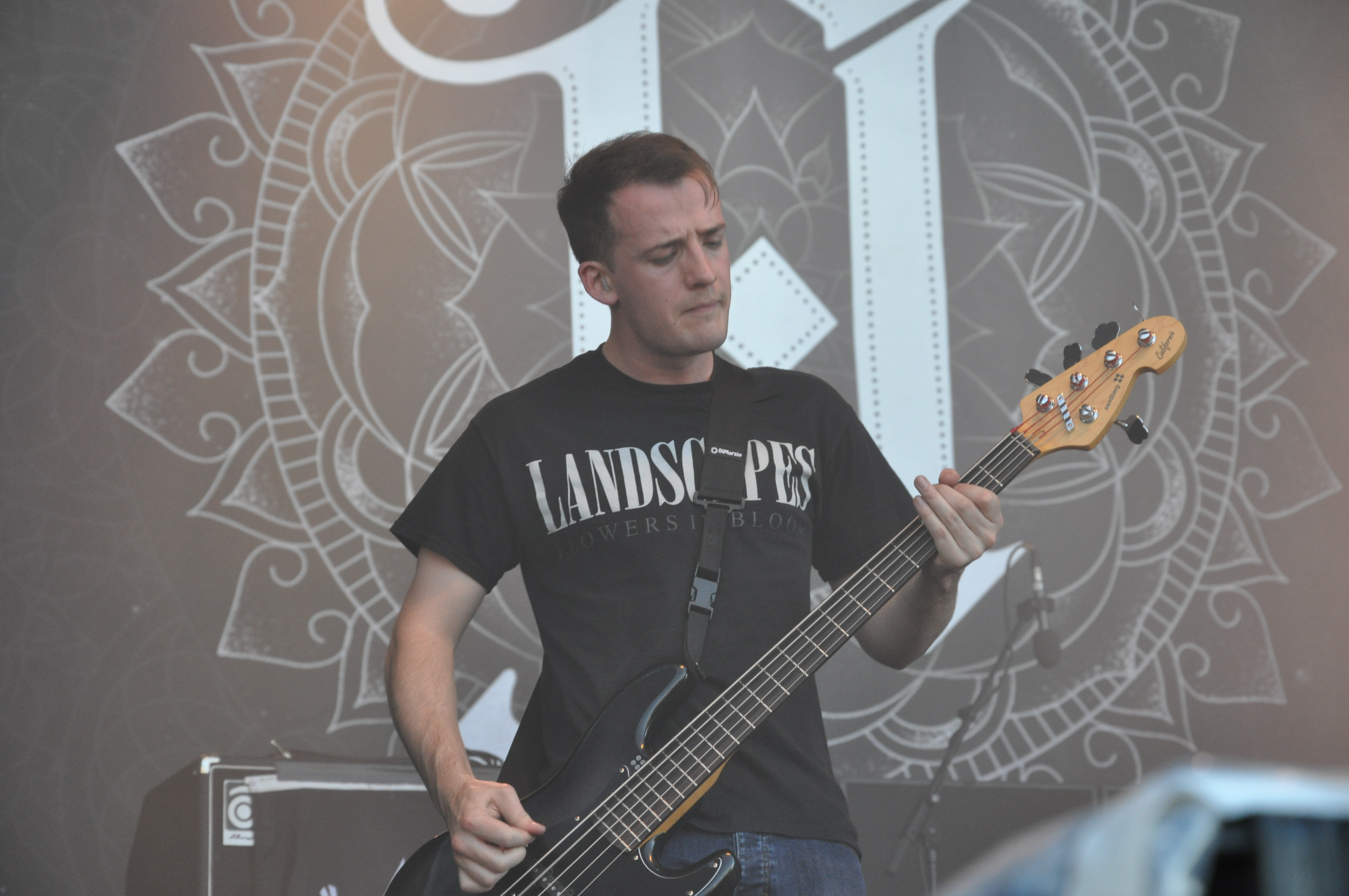
Architects' bassist Alex Dean performing at Rock am Ring 2014 in Germany

The first promotional tour for the album was in Europe; it started in the United Kingdom on 7 March 2014, reached through 15 countries, and ended in France on 16 April with constant support from Stray from the Path and Northlane while Landscapes opened on all of the British dates and More Than Life opened the shows in continental Europe. The tour was proving to be a success as their London date at the Koko sold out nine weeks prior and before any support bands were announced. On 9 June, they played the first of three nights of Radio 1 Rocks alongside Of Mice & Men and Bury Tomorrow at Maida Vale Studios, where they played a four-song set of "Naysayer"', "Broken Cross", "Colony Collapse" and "Gravedigger".

From 25 April to 21 May, Architects toured the United States in a co-headline tour Letlive in support of their album The Blackest Beautiful, with support from Glass Cloud and I The Mighty. The decision to do this tour came from the starting of Carter and Jason Aalon Butler [singer of letlive.] maintaining contact after meeting at the American Warped Tour 2013. Architects approached this tour initially very unsure about the amount of interest in them and saw the positive reception as a far-cry from the poor shows of their first tour of America with Suicide Silence in 2007 on The Cleansing The Nation Tour. Carter has commented that their 2013 tours of the United States with Enter Shikari and Protest The Hero helped "steer them in the right direction". Across the summer the band has lined up an array of European festival dates, including the British Reading & Leeds Festivals.

In further support of the record, they have lined up a supporting tour of The Amity Affliction in Australia, including two headline shows of their own in the country, and a Canadian tour; all across August and September. Across February and March 2015 Architects have lined-up a European headline tour with Every Time I Die, Blessthefall and Counterparts supporting.

== Reception ==
=== Critical reception ===
Professional ratings
Aggregate scores
Source	Rating
Metacritic	79/100
Review scores
Source	Rating
AllMusic	3.5/5 stars
Big Cheese	9/10
Exclaim!	8/10
Gigwise	4/10 stars
The Guardian	4/5 stars
Kerrang!	4/5 stars
Metal Hammer	8/10
Rock Sound	9/10
Shields Gazette	6/10
Sputnikmusic	2/5

Upon its release Lost Forever // Lost Together received generally positive reviews; with critics particularly praising their sonic direction of focusing on intensity while still retaining melody and "finding their sound". As an aggregated score, the album scored 79/100 on Metacritic—based on 6 reviews—indicating "Generally favourable reviews". Kerrang! writer Tom Bryant gave a praising four 'K's out of five "Excellent" review of the record noting how "Lost Forever // Lost Together does keep anger at its heart. In fact, its probably the heaviest album Architects have yet made. But, unlike on earlier records, that heaviness is focussed." Gregory Heaney of AllMusic noted how their use of dynamics between "both more ambient and more extreme" sounds they have produced a sound which defies the "creeping homogeneity of metalcore". Rock Sound gave the record a glowing nine out of ten review saying "Lost Forever // Lost Together [sic] is the sound of Architects finding and unleashing the buried treasure they've been searching for."

Shields Gazette published a six out of ten review of the album, saying that there is a lack of variation in the music and vocals, ultimately stating "it's also interchangeable with about 1,000 other bands doing practically the same thing". Nick Scott of Gigwise in a four out of ten review commented how there is a disconnection between the musicianship and vocals on the album, saying "the band wants to be tech and vocals want to be metalcore it's a constant state of aural confusion."

=== Accolades ===
Publication	Country	Accolade	Year	Rank
Revolver	UK	The Best Albums of 2014 – So Far	2014	3

Awards

Year	Nominee / work	Award	Result
Kerrang! Awards 2014	Architects	Best Album	Won

== Commercial performance ==
On its release, Lost Forever // Lost Together was one of ten new entries onto the British charts. In a mid-week chart update the album reached number 12, but by the end of the week achieved number 16.

== Track listing ==
All music is composed by Architects.

No.	Title	Length
1.	"Gravedigger"	4:05
2.	"Naysayer"	3:25
3.	"Broken Cross"	3:52
4.	"The Devil Is Near"	3:35
5.	"Dead Man Talking"	4:04
6.	"Red Hypergiant"	2:13
7.	"C.A.N.C.E.R"	4:19
8.	"Colony Collapse"	4:31
9.	"Castles in the Air"	3:42
10.	"Youth Is Wasted on the Young" (featuring Murray Macleod of The Xcerts)	4:23
11.	"The Distant Blue"	5:13
Total length:		43:26

Australian deluxe edition CD/DVD
No.	Title	Length
12.	"The Shadow of Doubt"	2:06
13.	"Untitled II"	1:51
Total length:		47:23

== Personnel ==
Architects

- Sam Carter – lead vocals
- Tom Searle – guitars, keyboards, programming, lyrics
- Alex "Ali" Dean – bass
- Dan Searle – drums, percussion, programming

Additional musicians

- Murray Macleod of The Xcerts – additional guest vocals on "Youth Is Wasted on the Young"
- Jenn Allen, Emily Rust and Ariel Loveland – violin
- Mark Shipley, Julie Slaugh and Kelsey Georgeson – viola
- Elizabeth Clarke and Michael Rollins – cello

Studio personnel at Studio Fredman

- Henrik Udd – production, engineering, mixing, mastering
- Fredrik Nordström – additional production
- Johan Henriksson – assistant engineering

Additional personnel

- Randy Slaugh – production, string arrangement, string engineering
- Ken Dudley (Cottonwood Studios) – mixing
- Chris Bellman – mastering
- Joey Simmrin (Rebellion Noise) – management
- Paul Ryan, Adam Sylvester and Josh Kline (The Agency Group) – booking
- Anthony Graystone – design

== Charts ==
Chart performance for Lost Forever // Lost Together
Chart (2014)	Peak position
Australian Albums (ARIA)	13
Austrian Albums (Ö3 Austria)	30
Belgian Albums (Ultratop Flanders)	111
Belgian Albums (Ultratop Wallonia)	161
German Albums (Offizielle Top 100)	36
Scottish Albums (OCC)	25
UK Albums (OCC)	16
UK Independent Albums (OCC)	4
UK Rock & Metal Albums (OCC)	1
US Billboard 200	125
US Independent Albums (Billboard)	21
US Top Rock Albums (Billboard)	34
US Top Hard Rock Albums (Billboard)	6

== Release history ==
Country	Date	Label	Format	Source
United States and Europe	11 March 2014	Epitaph	CD/LP	
Australia		UNFD	CD/LP	
Canada		New Damage	CD/LP	
