= Omen (Of Virtue album) =

Studio album by Of Virtue
- Released: October 27, 2023
- Genre: Metalcore, alternative metal, experimental metal
- Length: 39:22
- Label: Arising Empire
- Producer: Lee Albrecht; Evan McKeever; Randy Slaugh; Andrew Baylis; Carson Slovak; Grant McFarland; Chris Schifflett

Of Virtue chronology
Sinner (2022)	Omen (2023)

Singles from Omen
- 1. "A.N.X.I.E.T.Y." Released: February 9, 2023; 2. "Cannibals" Released: March 23, 2023; 3. "Cut Me Open" Released: June 20, 2023; 4. "Sober" Released: July 14, 2023; 5. "Holy" Released: August 17, 2023; 6. "True Colors" Released: September 14, 2023

Omen is the fourth studio album by American metalcore band Of Virtue. It was originally set to be released in September 2023, but it was ultimately released on October 27 after a month long delay. This is their second release through Arising Empire, following Sinner EP released in 2022.

== Overview ==
The first single, "A.N.X.I.E.T.Y." was released on February 9, 2023. The second single, "Cannibals" was released on March 23. On June 12, the album title and tracklist were unveiled. The third single, "Cut Me Open" was released on June 20. The fourth single, "Sober" was released on July 14.

== Reception ==
The album received mostly positive reviews from critics. Izzy Sheldon of Distorted Sound Mag gave the album a rating of 9/10. Pia Kam Schaper of PowerMetal.de gave it an 8/10 rating, praising the vulnerability of its lyrics and use of musical influences from nu metal and electronica.

== Track listing ==
All tracks are written by Of Virtue with additional writers listed.

Omen track listing
No.	Title	Writer(s)	Producer(s)	Length
1.	"Omen"	Lee Albrecht	Albrecht	3:31
2.	"Hypocrite"	McKeever; Randy Slaugh; Andrew Baylis	McKeever; Slaugh; Baylis	2:52
3.	"Cold Blooded"	McKeever; Slaugh	McKeever; Slaugh	3:05
4.	"Cut Me Open"	Albrecht; McKeever	Albrecht; McKeever	2:49
5.	"Sober"	Albrecht; McKeever	Albrecht; McKeever	2:46
6.	"A.N.X.I.E.T.Y."	Carson Slovak; Grant McFarland; Chris Schifflett	Slovak; McFarland; Schifflett	2:59
7.	"Floating" (featuring Rory Rodriguez of Dayseeker)	Albrecht	Albrecht	3:53
8.	"True Colors"	Albrecht	Albrecht	3:58
9.	"Sinner"	McKeever	McKeever	3:13
10.	"Holy"	Albrecht; McKeever	Albrecht; McKeever	3:17
11.	"Cannibals"	Albrecht	Albrecht	3:15
12.	"False Idols"	Albrecht	Albrecht	3:44
Total length:				39:22

Notes

- "Hypocrite", "Cold Blooded" and "Sinner" originally appeared on Sinner EP.

== Personnel ==
Credits adapted from Qobuz.

Of Virtue

- Tyler Ennis – vocals
- Damon Tate – guitar, vocals
- Michael Valadez – guitar
- Ryan Trinh – drums

Additional musicians

- Rory Rodriguez of Dayseeker – guest vocals (7)

Additional personnel

- Dan Braunstein – mixing & mastering
- Lee Albrecht – production (1, 4, 5, 7, 8, 10–12)
- Evan McKeever – production (2–5, 9, 10)
- Randy Slaugh – additional production (2, 3)
- Andrew Baylis – production (2)
- Carson Slovak – production (6)
- Grant McFarland – production (6)
- Chris Schifflett – production (6)
