= One Thousand Wings =

Studio album by White Moth Black Butterfly
- Released: November 11, 2013
- Recorded: 2012–2013
- Genre: Progressive pop; adult contemporary
- Length: 48:00
- Label: Independent
- Producer: Daniel Tompkins; Keshav Dhar

White Moth Black Butterfly chronology
One Thousand Wings (2013)	Atone (2017)

Professional ratings
Review scores
Source	Rating
Prog Magazine	4.5/5 stars
Sputnik Music	4/5 stars

One Thousand Wings is the debut studio album by the progressive pop group White Moth Black Butterfly. It was released independently on November 11, 2013.

== Track listing ==
1. Reluctance (3:04)
2. Equinox (4:17)
3. Ties of Grace (4:06)
4. The World Won't Sleep (5:36)
5. Rose (5:08)
6. Midnight Rivers (3:30)
7. Tired Eyes (4:23)
8. Certainty (4:04)
9. Omen (4:44)
10. Faith (4:12)
11. Paradise (4:00)
