= Daybreaker (Architects album) =

Studio album by Architects
- Released: 28 May 2012
- Recorded: January–February 2012
- Studio: Outhouse Studios, Reading, Berkshire, UK
- Genre: Metalcore; progressive metal; mathcore; post-hardcore
- Length: 41:29
- Label: Century Media; Zestone
- Producer: Ben Humphreys; Architects

Architects studio album chronology
The Here and Now (2011)	Daybreaker (2012)	Lost Forever // Lost Together (2014)

Singles from Daybreaker
- 1. "Devil's Island" Released: 4 December 2011; 2. "These Colours Don't Run" Released: 26 March 2012; 3. "Alpha Omega" Released: 7 May 2012

Singles from Daybreaker (US re-issue)
- 1. "Black Blood" Released: 3 June 2013

Daybreaker is the fifth studio album by English metalcore band Architects. It was released on 28 May 2012 through Zestone and Century Media Records in the United Kingdom and most of Europe and on 5 June 2012 in the United States. It was the last album to feature guitarist Tim Hillier-Brook, who left the band on 16 April 2012. Daybreaker was co-produced by the band and Ben Humphreys at Outhouse Studios in Reading, Berkshire, and used the same team and studio that were used for recording the band's third studio album, Hollow Crown. Daybreaker was praised by music writers for its variety.

The album debuted on charts in five countries but failed to appear on any mainstream top 40. To promote it, Architects released five music videos, toured five continents (2012's Almost World Tour was filmed for the documentary One Hundred Days) and issued a re-release of the album to commemorate their departure from Century Media Records. Daybreaker received a positive response from critics; some praised its use of atmospheric elements and the return to a heavier style, while others criticised it as uninspired.

== Background and recording ==
In the band's fourth album, 2011's The Here and Now, the band set out to mix their typical sounds with the music they were listening to at the time. The response was polarising. During the publicity for The Here and Now, the band praised it as a progression for them; they did not want to reject an album they had just released. But their own lack of belief in the record and their growing concern that they were irrelevant started to severely affect the band's confidence in themselves and their style.

Songs recorded during early demo sessions after The Here and Now became b-sides for re-releases. During this time, the band became certain they wished to make another "heavy" record. Tom Searle said, "some people might say we've regressed, but I think we've found our enthusiasm for playing heavy music again. I'm excited again by what I've come up with on guitar and lyrically it's much more political and less personal." The band started to write socially aware lyrics during the writing phase of Daybreaker; vocalist Sam Carter said this was a result of the band touring the world and seeing things he felt were downplayed by the media.

The band recorded Daybreaker at Outhouse Studios in Reading, Berkshire, where they had previously recorded Ruin (2007) and Hollow Crown (2009). Daybreaker had the same production and engineering team as did Hollow Crown; John Mitchell acted as Daybreaker's mixing engineer, and Mitchell described Daybreaker as "the album they should have made after Hollow Crown". Tom Searle said that during the recording, he and Hillier-Brook were constantly practising to perfect the highly technical guitar riffs.

Architects invited Jon Green from Deez Nuts, Oliver Sykes from Bring Me the Horizon, and Drew York from Stray from the Path to sing on the album. They invited Green because they believed his screaming vocals had a "Satanic" quality, while a collaboration with Sykes was something the band considered "long overdue", since Carter had sung on Bring Me the Horizon's 2008 album Suicide Season. On 16 April 2012, shortly before Daybreaker's release, Hillier-Brook announced he would leave the band to pursue other projects. The band had thought Hiller-Brook seemed unhappy while he was a member of Architects.

== Composition ==
=== Style ===
Truth, Be Told
The album's fifth track follows a "pacing and innovative, loop-like rhythmic structure" while also offering a subtle nod to their technical style.

Devil's Island
The album's first single has been described as a "full-body seizure set to electric guitar" which opens with a "calming, sentimental intro" and uses lyrics which comment directly on the 2011 England Riots.

According to Andrew Kelham, Daybreaker is an "urgent and resurgent" record; it has been identified by critics as metalcore, progressive metal, mathcore and post-hardcore. Architects have been credited for fusing the intense technicality and metallic style of Hollow Crown with the "soaring vocals" and the much improved production of The Here and Now. The album is defined by a number of features, including a contrast of singing and extreme metal screaming, and melodic choruses complemented by "soaring" vocals, technical guitar work with palm muted breakdowns and the use of string instruments and piano to generate atmosphere. Daybreaker is noted for fusing influences from Architects' previous two albums The Here And Now and Hollow Crown; many reviewers have cited the album as a return to the band's heavier, more technical roots. When he interviewed the band, Kelham wrote, "some will see Daybreaker as an apology, but it's not. Others will view it as a hasty attempt to claw back the glories of third album Hollow Crown, but it's not that either. It's a collection of songs about moving on, growing up and making sense of what has come before".

The record's opening track is "The Bitter End", an introduction built on skittish electronics, dark piano chords, xylophone notes, orchestral harmonies, haunting vocals and lyrics. The album then breaks into intense and heavy songs such as "high-octane" tracks "Alpha Omega" and "These Colours Don't Run", which are full of "interesting rhythms and powerful melodies".

The piano-led track "Truth, Be Told" gives the record a break from the chaos; it explores post-hardcore territory by following a "loop-like rhythmic structure". "Outsider Heart" has been compared to the math rock guitar playing of Meshuggah. "Devil's Island" has been described as "a full-body seizure set to electric guitar". Architects began to experiment with elements such as the addition of string instruments and piano that would help generate atmosphere. This is evident in the melodic songs "Truth, Be Told", "Behind the Throne" and "Unbeliever". "Behind the Throne" is an intense, atmospheric, ambient-rock song with a grandiose, electro-drummed backdrop.

=== Themes ===
It was the first time we'd written a song about something that was relevant socially and not just based on what I had directly experience through life or something else. It was bigger-picture, and when we released it that song got people talking about something broader than whether on not they think Bring Me the Horizon are better than Architects or vice versa.

— Sam Carter's response when asked about the writing phase of Daybreaker and Devil's Island in an interview in 2012.

Lyrically, the album discusses negative aspects of religion and society, and is seen as a "companion piece" to Enter Shikari's A Flash Flood of Colour. Daybreaker's lyrics were written by Carter and Tom Searle, who focused on political and "bigger picture" themes. Carter described "Devil's Island" as "one of the hardest songs to write" because of the prominence of its theme of rioting. Searle, who focused on its lyrics, said, "With money firmly ingrained into our global society we really need to look to alternative solutions when problems like the riots occur because violence is never the solution". Carter said "Black Blood", which was included on the re-release, is about the oil industry, society's strong dependence on oil and the way "short term profit is the only thing these people think about, instead of the longevity of what we really could do and how we could stabilize what's really going on in the world right now".

== Release and promotion ==
Daybreaker was first announced with a tentative release date of "summer". The album was released in the United Kingdom on 28 May 2012. In June 2013, Century Media Records re-released it in North America exclusively for the band's performance at Warped Tour 2013. This version includes their single "Black Blood" and covers of Bon Iver's "Blood Bank" and Thrice's "Of Dust and Nations".

=== Singles ===
In early November 2011, Architects announced a plan to release "Devil's Island", the first song from the then-unnamed follow-up to their fourth studio album The Here and Now. They released it on 4 December 2011, with a b-side song called "Untitled". (Note: The song is not untitled: "Untitled" is its title.) Both the song and the accompanying music video reference rioting in England in 2011, and the music video features clips of the riots. "Devil's Island" was well received by critics for its return to the mathcore style of their third album, Hollow Crown. Thrash Hits said, "more-melodic aspects of Architects are still very much on show", that the song used "increased harsh vocals" and that the guitar tones were reminiscent of those on "Early Grave", the opening track of Hollow Crown. J.J. Nattrass of Bring The Noise said, "the track is sweeping and melodic in parts, whilst bursting with high tempo and visceral raw energy in others." Tim Dodderidge, writing for Mind Equals Blown, praised the song's lyrics, saying, "Architects has taken on an important issue in Britain today and made a song that questions humanity; it may have a lasting effect on listeners that bands like Rise Against have been able to do, though they sound nothing alike". The band supported the single's release with a five-day UK headline tour in December 2011; supporting acts were Deaf Havana, Tek-One and Heights.

On 26 March 2012, Architects released a typography-styled music video for "These Colours Don't Run". The music video was designed to "capture the madness that is America, be it good or bad". Tom Searle wanted the video "[to get] people thinking and talking. And in the land of the free—you know nothing comes for free!" The band's third single "Alpha Omega" was released on 7 May 2012 after a radio debut on Daniel P. Carter's BBC Radio 1 Rock Show podcast on 24 April 2012. The music video for the song was posted on 10 May 2012. On 12 December, Architects released another typography-styled video for "Even If You Win, You're Still a Rat".

"Black Blood" was released on 3 June 2013 to promote the re-released version of Daybreaker; the single also had a typography-style video. The song was released in conjunction with Architects' performances at Warped Tour 2013; it was featured on the Warped Tour sampler that was released for free download on Amazon.com. The band initially wanted to record a music video for the song but they cancelled shooting because Tom Searle was afflicted with skin cancer.

=== Live performances ===
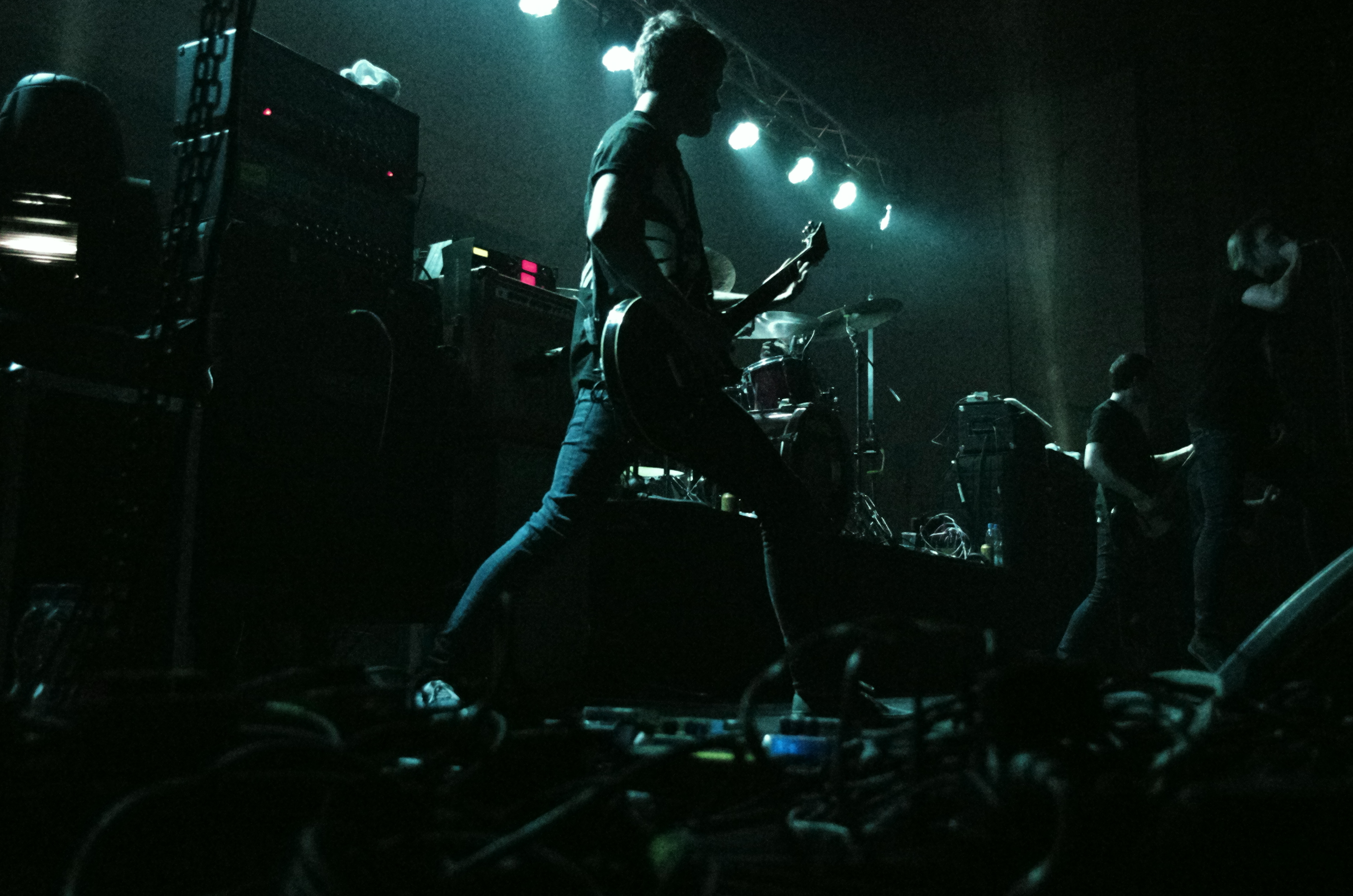
Architects' guitarist Tom Searle performing on-stage in Colombia. The band performed on five continents to promote Daybreaker.

Throughout March 2012, Architects and Touché Amoré supported Rise Against on their European tour. Hillier-Brook's last tour with Architects was the April 2012 British tour with Rolo Tomassi and Stray from the Path. Between March and June that year—the last few months before the large tours in support of Daybreaker—Architects performed at several festivals; the Swiss Konzerthaus Schüür in Lucerne, the La Boule Noire near Paris, Groezrock Festival in Belgium, British touring festival Slam Dunk Festival in Leeds and Hatfield, and German festivals Summerblast Festival, Traffic Jam Festival and Summerbreeze Festival. Because Hillier-Brook had announced he would leave Architects on 16 April 2012 after his final performance with the band at Groezrock Festival, Josh Middleton of Sylosis joined the band as touring guitarist. In late April, Architects supported The Devil Wears Prada and Whitechapel on a six-day tour of South America.

Architects began promoting Daybreaker by playing several large European festivals throughout June and July 2013, before embarking on tour legs in south-east Asia, Australasia, North America and Europe, which were dubbed The Daybreaker Almost World Tour. Most of the tour dates were published in July, the first leg of the tour began in August with 16 dates in Canada with support from Struc/tures and Asightforsewneyes. In September, the band headed to Asia to play dates in Hong Kong, Malaysia, Thailand, Singapore, Indonesia and China. In late September and early October, the band played 12 gigs in New Zealand and Australia supporting The Amity Affliction—it was Architects' first tour of Australia since December 2010. The final leg of the tour took place in Europe, with supporting bands While She Sleeps and Heights in mainland Europe, and Deez Nuts, Bury Tomorrow and The Acacia Strain in the UK. The tour's British leg included a gig at UK Warped Tour, a one-day festival headlined by Lostprophets and Bring Me the Horizon at Alexandra Palace in London on 10 November . A documentary about Architects' touring experiences was titled "One Hundred Days: The Story of Architects Almost World Tour".

In 2013, Architects expanded their promotional reach to the United States, a country they were not confident in. They were "tired of losing money" with their tours in the US and "[the band] were about ready to give up on America". Starting in March, with opening act Crossfaith they supported Enter Shikari and then joined the American Warped Tour 2013 in June. The band also made single appearances in Europe at several summer festivals, including Download Festival 2013 in the UK. The band announced they would tour the US for the third time in 2013 in November and December with co-headliners Protest The Hero and support from The Kindred and Affiance. They also announced plans to tour Australia before the end of 2013. Architects' final performance in support of Daybreaker and their first in India occurred at the Saarang culture festival on 11 January 2014.

== Reception ==
=== Critical reception ===
Professional ratings
Aggregate scores
Source	Rating
Metacritic	73/100
Review scores
Source	Rating
About.com	4/5 stars
Big Cheese	(4/5)
Canoe.com	2.5/5 stars
Consequence of Sound	3.5/5 stars
Metal Hammer	(7/10)
Rock Sound	(8/10)

Daybreaker received positive reviews from music critics. Some reviewers praised the band for texturing and progressing their sound, and for writing socio-political lyrics. The album was criticised for sounding forced or formulaic. At Metacritic, which assigns a normalized rating out of 100 to reviews from mainstream critics, Daybreaker received an average score of 73, based on 8 reviews, which indicates generally favourable reviews.

About.com writer Ryan Cooper praised the album, awarded it four stars out of five and said it "laughs in the face of those who think passionate realism, artistic integrity and mass commercial appeal are all mutually exclusive. Daybreaker balances all three with pretty much perfect dexterity." Raziq Rauf writing for the BBC Music praised the band for the album's musical diversity with its use of electronic songs like album-opener "The Bitter End" and the band's use of technicality and melody in songs. He summarised the album by saying, "Daybreaker is a great album. It'll go down as one of Architects' finest works—it's certainly their most well-rounded release to date." Big Cheese writer Paul Hagen praised the album's lyrical content, saying, "Socially turbulent times seems to produce the best music and if bands can keep channelling genuine anger into their art, there are going to be some more really great albums released over the next few years".

Canadian music magazine Exclaim! published two reviews of Daybreaker. Bradley Zorgdrager gave an unfavourable review of the album's sound. He said although the tracks are "catchy and occasionally compelling, they're essentially identical and formulaic, as the atmospheric build-ups and soaring riffs make way for boring breakdowns. The metal-influenced parts sound forced to appease fans disappointed with their last release, which results in Daybreaker sounding more like a business move than a work of art." Scott Harms' review was more favourable, praising the band's return to a much more aggressive style. He credits it for incorporating influences from previous albums, saying "they have found a balance in which to return to the Searle brothers' heavy sounds while carefully incorporating Sam Carter's soaring clean vocals". Harms summarised his review by saying, "as a whole, [Daybreaker] sounds epic". Adam Rees of Metal Hammer rated the album 7 out of 10, acknowledging the "abundant" inclusion of string instruments and piano and the way these instruments create atmosphere. Ress ended his review by calling Daybreaker, "A brave and brilliant British metal album". Canoe.com author Darryl Sterdan awarded the album 2.5 stars out of 5, saying it "balanc[es] their newfound sensitivity and maturity with plenty of good old-fashioned techno-metal frenzy and primal-scream aggro. Pity they didn't write memorable songs while they were at it."

AltSounds writer Candice Haridimou gave the album a rating of 94 out of 100 and praised the album's lyrical content. She said the political nature of the album also uses emotional dramatisation to capture the listener, particularly in songs like "Devil's Island". Haridimou states the song "drives remorse into the cold hearts of those involved. It's a severe and poignant song that will stand the test of time." Ryan Bird, in an otherwise positive review of Daybreaker, criticised it upon first hearing it; he said it struggled to settle into any distinctive rhythm or groove. However, Bird concluded his review by saying, "but despite its relative (and relatively few) faults. Daybreaker represents a victory for a band who some had once been so eager to write off, suggesting that maybe—just maybe—they've got what it takes to bring both sides [of their fanbase] together".

=== Accolades ===
Daybreaker featured on several lists of best albums of 2012, including Rock Sounds top 50 at number 48, Kerrang!'s 101 at number 36 and Ourzone's at number 23 out of 25.

== Commercial performance ==
Daybreaker debuted at number one on the UK Rock & Metal Albums Chart and at number 42 on the UK Album Charts for selling 3,208 copies. It became the highest-charting release by Architects in their five-album career; The Here And Now had reached number 57. The next week, the album fell to number 12 on the Rock & Metal, then to number 33, and it left the chart the following week. The album debuted on the US Top Heatseekers chart at number 28, selling 1,200 copies in its first week. In Belgium, the album charted at number 182, and in Germany at number 93.

== Track listing ==
All music is composed by Architects.

No.	Title	Length
1.	"The Bitter End"	2:55
2.	"Alpha Omega"	3:55
3.	"These Colours Don't Run" (featuring Jon Green of Deez Nuts)	4:01
4.	"Daybreak"	3:32
5.	"Truth, Be Told"	4:31
6.	"Even If You Win, You're Still a Rat" (featuring Oliver Sykes of Bring Me the Horizon)	3:12
7.	"Outsider Heart" (featuring Drew York of Stray from the Path)	3:27
8.	"Behind the Throne"	4:08
9.	"Devil's Island"	4:06
10.	"Feather of Lead"	2:50
11.	"Unbeliever"	4:43
Total length:		41:29

iTunes UK bonus tracks
No.	Title	Length
12.	"Rise Against"	3:51
Total length:		45:20

Japanese bonus tracks
No.	Title	Length
12.	"Cracks in the Earth"	3:21
13.	"Rise Against"	3:51
14.	"Untitled"	3:29
Total length:		52:10

US re-issue bonus tracks
No.	Title	Length
12.	"Black Blood"	4:33
13.	"Cracks in the Earth"	3:21
14.	"Blood Bank" (Bon Iver cover)	5:14
15.	"Of Dust and Nations" (Thrice cover)	3:42
Total length:		58:19

== Personnel ==
Architects

- Sam Carter – lead vocals
- Tom Searle – lead guitar, keyboards, programming
- Tim Hillier-Brook – rhythm guitar
- Alex "Ali" Dean – bass
- Dan Searle – drums, percussion, programming

Additional musicians

- Jon Green of Deez Nuts – guest vocals on track 3, "These Colours Don't Run"
- Oliver Sykes of Bring Me the Horizon – guest vocals on track 6, "Even If You Win, You're Still a Rat"
- Drew York of Stray from the Path – guest vocals on track 7, "Outsider Heart"

Additional personnel

- Ben Humphreys and Architects – production
- John Mitchell – mixing
- Harry Hess – mastering
- Paul Jackson – album cover

== Charts ==
Chart performance for Daybreaker
Chart (2012)	Peak position
Belgium Albums (Ultratop Flanders)	182
German Albums (Offizielle Top 100)	93
Scottish Albums (OCC)	53
UK Albums (OCC)	42
UK Rock & Metal Albums (OCC)	1
US Heatseekers Albums (Billboard)	28

== Release history ==
Country	Date	Label	Format	Catalog number	Source
United Kingdom	28 May 2012	Century Media	CD/LP	9981881	
Europe	28 May 2012	Century Media	CD/LP	9981882	
North America	5 June 2012	Century Media	CD/LP	188882	
Japan	6 June 2012	Zestone	CD/LP	—	
