= Sunshine Dust =

Studio album by Skyharbor
- Released: 7 September 2018
- Studio: Studio Circuit, Emery Recording Studios, Illusion Audio
- Genre: Progressive metal
- Length: 61:43
- Label: eOne, Good Fight
- Producer: Forrester Savell

Skyharbor chronology
Guiding Lights (2014)	Sunshine Dust (2018)

Sunshine Dust is the third and final studio album by progressive metal band Skyharbor, released on September 7, 2018 by eOne Music & Good Fight Music. It is their first album with singer Eric Emery and drummer Aditya Ashok.

== Recording ==
Recording began as early as 2015, with "Out of Time" released in August of that year as the first single from the then-untitled album. After two additional singles, "Blind Side" and "Synthetic Hands", the band stated that the album, now titled Sunshine Dust, would be released in mid-2017. However, the band were unsatisfied with the initial recordings and decided to re-record the entire album, pushing its release date back to September 2018.

== Reception ==
Upon its release, the album received several favorable or mixed reviews. SoundFiction noted the band's growth as songwriters, stating "Sunshine Dust constantly walks on untreaded turf, planting its flag with moments of pure compositional excellence." Distorted Sound gave the album a positive review but concluded that it "displays some shining moments [but] it feels incredibly safe" and advised the band to "step out of their comfort zone if they are to rise to prominence in one of metal’s most hotly contested genres."

Metal Injection published a similarly mixed review, praising the band's songwriting and musicianship but criticizing the album's "whiny, grating choruses" and inconsistent stylistic shifts. The Sound Board concluded that the album does not rise too far beyond the typical sounds of progressive metal, but there are "isolated moments that see Skyharbor bringing in outside influences" that can appeal to fans. Metal Hammer was more charitable, commending the strengths of the new line-up and concluding, "Sunshine Dust continues Skyharbor’s run of dependably great albums."

== Track listing ==
All songs written by Skyharbor.

No.	Title	Length
1.	"Signal"	1:21
2.	"Dim"	4:59
3.	"Out of Time"	4:57
4.	"Synthetic Hands"	5:42
5.	"Blind Side"	6:38
6.	"Disengage / Evacuate"	6:13
7.	"Ethos"	4:09
8.	"Ugly Heart"	4:29
9.	"The Reckoning"	6:25
10.	"Dissent"	3:35
11.	"Menace"	4:49
12.	"Temptress"	2:16
13.	"Sunshine Dust"	6:19
Total length:		61.43

== Personnel ==
Skyharbor

- Keshav Dhar – guitar, sound design
- Eric Emery – vocals
- Krishna Jhaveri – bass, synthesizers
- Aditya Ashok – drums, sound design
- Devesh Dayal – guitar

Additional personnel

- Forrester Savell – production, mixing, mastering
- Luke Palmer – co-songwriting on "Sunshine Dust"
- Randy Slaugh – strings on "Out of Time"
