= Blinding White Noise: Illusion and Chaos =

Blinding White Noise: Illusion & Chaos

Studio album by Skyharbor
- Released: April 23, 2012
- Genre: Progressive metal, djent
- Length: 47:58
- Label: Basick
- Producer: Keshav Dhar

Skyharbor chronology
Blinding White Noise: Illusion & Chaos (2012)	Guiding Lights (2014)

Blinding White Noise: Illusion & Chaos is the debut studio album by progressive metal band Skyharbor. It was released on April 23, 2012, through Basick Records. This is a double-disc album. Daniel Tompkins (who would later join Skyharbor) performed vocal duties on disc one (Illusion), and Sunneith Revankar (Bhayanak Maut) performed vocal duties on disc two (Chaos). The album features several guest appearances, including Marty Friedman (ex-Megadeth) who performed guitar solos on 'Catharsis' and 'Celestial'. Vishal J. Singh of Amogh Symphony contributed a classical guitar solo on 'Celestial' as well. New Zealand based musician and renowned producer Zorran Mendonsa played additional guitars on 'Trayus'. Disc 2 (Chaos) features largely harsh vocals with the occasional clean sung chorus, while Disc 1 (Illusion) features almost entirely clean vocals.

== Track listing ==
=== Disc one ===
All tracks are written by Keshav Dhar.

No.	Title	Length
1.	"Illusion: Dots"	3:34
2.	"Illusion: Order 66"	3:34
3.	"Illusion: Catharsis" (featuring Marty Friedman)	7:08
4.	"Illusion: Night"	2:15
5.	"Illusion: Aurora"	4:04
6.	"Illusion: Celestial" (featuring Vishal J. Singh and Marty Friedman)	7:02
7.	"Illusion: Maeva"	6:44
Total length:		34:20

=== Disc two ===
All tracks are written by Keshav Dhar.

No.	Title	Length
1.	"Chaos: Trayus" (featuring Zorran Mendonsa)	4:51
2.	"Chaos: Aphasia"	4:05
3.	"Chaos: Insurrection"	4:45
Total length:		13:38

== Personnel ==
Skyharbor

- Keshav Dhar - Guitars, Bass, Drum programming, Production & Mixing

Additional musicians

- Daniel Tompkins - Vocals and Lyrics on Disc One
- Sunneith Revankar - Vocals and Lyrics on Disc Two
- Marty Friedman - Guitar Solos on 'Catharsis' and 'Celestial'
- Vishal J. Singh - Guitar Solo on 'Celestial'
- Zorran Mendonsa - Additional Guitars on 'Trayus'
