= Guiding Lights =

Studio album by Skyharbor
- Released: November 10, 2014
- Genre: Progressive metal
- Length: 68:21
- Label: Basick
- Producer: Skyharbor, Forrester Savell

Skyharbor chronology
Blinding White Noise: Illusion and Chaos (2012)	Guiding Lights (2014)	Sunshine Dust (2018)

Guiding Lights is the second studio album by progressive metal band Skyharbor. It was released on November 10, 2014 through Basick Records.

== Track listing ==
No.	Title	Length
1.	"Allure" (featuring Mark Holcomb)	6:46
2.	"Evolution"	5:39
3.	"Idle Minds"	7:46
4.	"Miracle"	5:59
5.	"Halogen"	7:02
6.	"New Devil"	6:55
7.	"Patience"	4:42
8.	"Guiding Lights"	9:22
9.	"Kaikoma" (featuring Valentina Reptile)	4:37
10.	"The Constant" (featuring Plini Roessler-Holgate)	9:33
Total length:		68:21

== Personnel ==
Skyharbor

- Daniel Tompkins – Vocals, vocal engineering
- Keshav Dhar – Guitars, guitar and bass engineering
- Devesh Dayal – Guitars
- Krishna Jhaveri – Bass guitar
- Anup Sastry – Drums, drum engineering

Additional personnel

- Forrester Savell – Mixing, mastering
- Anupam Roy – Additional bass engineering
- Michael Di Lonardo – Artwork, visual concept
- Mark Holcomb – Second guitar solo on 'Allure'
- Valentina Reptile – Guest vocals on 'Kaikoma'
- Plini Roessler-Holgate – Guitar solo on 'The Constant'
- Randy Slaugh – Arranging and engineering string quartet on 'Patience'
