= Of Virtue =

American metalcore band

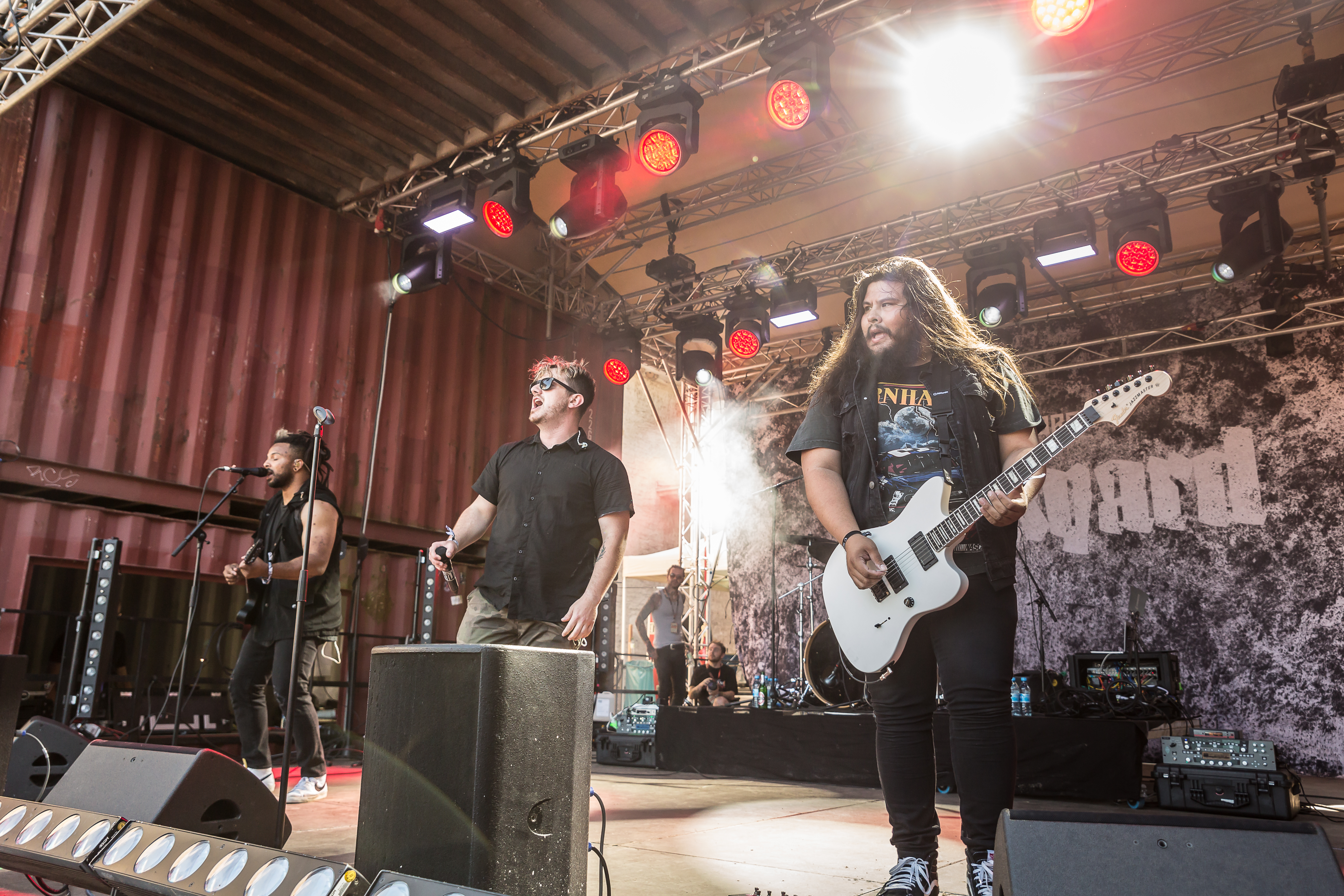
- Of Virtue in 2022

Background information
- Origin: Lansing, Michigan, U.S.
- Genres: Metalcore; alternative metal
- Years active: 2008–present
- Labels: Arising Empire; SharpTone
- Members: Tyler Ennis; Damon Tate; Michael Valadez; Ryan Trinh
- Past members: Nick Maltby; Jon Fox; Ryan Wilkinson; Kyle Pruehs
- Website: ofvirtueband.com

Of Virtue is an American metalcore band formed in Lansing, Michigan in 2008. The band consists of lead vocalist Tyler Ennis, guitarist and co-lead vocalist Damon Tate, guitarist Michael Valadez and drummer Ryan Trinh. The band has released four albums and three EPs; their latest album Omen was released on October 27, 2023.

== History ==
Of Virtue was formed in 2008. On December 19, 2009, they self-released their debut EP To Breathe Again.

On August 27, 2011, they released their debut album Heartsounds.

On December 16, 2012, they released a two track EP Learn/Love.

On June 2, 2015, they released their second album Salvation.

In 2018, Of Virtue released two singles "Surrounded" and "Torn Apart".

In early 2019, they announced their signing to SharpTone Records and released "Suffer" from their then upcoming third album What Defines You. The album was released on May 24, along with the music video for the song "Alone". The music video for "Immortal" was released on September 25. On November 13, 2020, the band released the acoustic rendition of "Torn Apart", announcing the deluxe edition of their third album at the same time. The deluxe edition of the album was released on November 20. On December 9, the band released a music video for the reimagined version of the song "Pictures of You", featuring Patrick Harney.

On April 28, 2022, they announced that they parted ways with SharpTone Records and signed to Arising Empire. They also released their single "Sinner" on the same day. On June 2, they released "Hypocrite". On July 15, they announced their EP Sinner, which was released on August 12. The music video for "Cold Blooded" was released the day before the EP.

On February 8, 2023, they released a music video for their song "A.N.X.I.E.T.Y.". On March 22, they released a music video for "Cannibals". On June 12, they announced their fourth studio album Omen, which is scheduled to release on September 29. The third single "Cut Me Open" was released on June 20.

On January 30, 2026, they released a music video for their single "Death of the Altar".

On March 27, 2026, they released "The Art of Love".

On May 22, 2026, they released "What's It Like to Be Happy?".

== Members ==
Current members

- Tyler Ennis – vocals (2017–present)
- Damon Tate – guitar, vocals (2008–present)
- Michael Valadez – guitar (2008–present)
- Ryan Trinh – drums (2021–present)

Former members

- Nick Maltby – vocals (2008–2015)
- Jon Fox – bass guitar (2010–2018)
- Ryan Wilkinson – drums (2011–2017)
- Kyle Pruehs – drums (2018–2021)
- Shon Allen – drums (2008–2011)
- Kyle Jacobsen – guitar (2008–2009)
- Craig Creeder – drums (2008–2009)

== Discography ==
Studio albums

- Heartsounds (2011)
- Salvation (2015)
- What Defines You (2019)
- Omen (2023)
- Death of the Altar (2026)

EPs

- To Breathe Again (2009)
- Learn/Love (2012)
- Sinner (2022)

Singles

- "Surrounded" (2018)
- "Torn Apart" (2018)
- "Suffer" (2019)
- "No Control" (2019)
- "Thanks for Nothing" (2019)
- "Torn Apart" (Acoustic) (2020)
- "Sinner" (2022)
- "Hypocrite" (2022)
- "A.N.X.I.E.T.Y." (2023)
- "Cannibals" (2023)
- "Cut Me Open" (2023)
- "Sober" (2023)
- "Holy" (2023)
- "Death of the Altar" (2026)
- "The Art of Love" (2026)
- "What's It Like to Be Happy?" (2026)
