= One Hundred Days: The Story of Architects Almost World Tour =

- Directed by: Tom Welsh
- Starring: Architects
- Narrated by: Alex Dean; Tom Searle
- Music by: Architects
- Distributed by: Self-released
- Release date: 1 October 2013
- Running time: 135 minutes
- Country: United Kingdom
- Language: English
- Budget: £30,000

One Hundred Days: The Story of Architects Almost World Tour (or simply One Hundred Days) is a documentary about English metalcore band Architects' Daybreaker Almost World Tour, a promotional tour for their fifth studio album Daybreaker. The funding for the film was achieved through a crowd funding project on Indiegogo, where they had a target of £30,000 to reach, but they reached over £10,000 of that sum.

== Background ==
One Hundred Days is the filming of Architects' Daybreaker Almost World Tour which took place in 2012 where they played 75 shows in 25 countries over 4 continents. The documentary is primarily narrated by Architects' bassist Alex Dean and guitarist Tom Searle. One Hundred Days was directed by and filmed by Tom Welsh, who followed the band on the entire tour. The tour was very ambitious and took them to areas of the world they've never toured in like: China, Hong Kong, Thailand, Singapore, Malaysia, Indonesia and New Zealand and completed their first headline tour of Mainland Europe.

Architects wanted the documentary to provide a real portrayal of what it's like to tour in a band of their size. Sam Carter commented on the honesty of the portrayal stating "we wanted to film the ups and downs of not a really big band[...] we're really modest about what we do". They also commented that it was similar to Parkway Drive: The DVD, only scaled down.

== The Almost World Tour's touring schedule ==
Date	City	Venue	Country
Canada, Leg #1 Support from Struc/tures and asightforsewneyes
13 August 2012	Quebec City, Quebec	l'Agitée	Canada
15 August 2012	London, Ontario	Rum Runners	Canada
17 August 2012	Toronto, Ontario	Opera House	Canada
18 August 2012	Montreal, Quebec	Itamelodie	Canada
19 August 2012	Ottawa, Ontario	Mavericks	Canada
20 August 2012	Kingston, Ontario	Time To Laugh	Canada
23 August 2012	Thunder Bay, Ontario	Crocks	Canada
24 August 2012	Winnipeg, Manitoba	West End Cultural Centre	Canada
25 August 2012	Regina, Saskatchewan	The Exchange	Canada
26 August 2012	Saskatoon, Saskatchewan	Louis Pub	Canada
28 August 2012	Edmonton, Alberta	Avenue Theatre	Canada
29 August 2012	Calgary, Alberta	SALT	Canada
30 August 2012	Kamloops, British Columbia	Knights of Columbus	Canada
31 August 2012	Vancouver, British Columbia	Tom Fun Hall	
China, Leg #2 support from CDC, The Falling
6 September 2012	Beijing	Mao	China
7 September 2012	Wuhan	Vox	China
8 September 2012	Shanghai	Shanghai Live	China
9 September 2012	Guangzhou	Musician	China
11 September 2012	Hong Kong Island	Kwun Tong	Hong Kong
South-east Asia, Leg #3
12 September 2012	Bangkok	Barbies Pub (later moved to The Rock Pub)	Thailand
13 September 2012	Singapore	Scape Warehouse (moved to Homeclub)	Singapore
14 September 2012	Kuala Lumpur	Black Box	Malaysia
15 September 2012	Jakarta	Viky Sianipar	Indonesia
16 September 2012	Bali	Katulebo Moshpit Area	Indonesia
New Zealand, Leg #4
21 September 2012	Auckland	Kings Arms	New Zealand
22 September 2012	Wellington	Bodegga	New Zealand
'Chasing Ghosts Tour', Leg #5 Supporting The Amity Affliction with The Ghost Inside and Buried in Verona
26 September 2012	Brisbane	The Tivoli	Australia
27 September 2012	Brisbane	The Tivoli	Australia
28 September 2012	Newcastle	Panthers	Australia
29 September 2012	Sydney	Big Top	Australia
2 October 2012	Canberra	UC Live	Australia
5 October 2012	Melbourne	Palace Theatre (Under 18's performance)	Australia
5 October 2012	Melbourne	Palace Theatre	Australia
6 October 2012	Adelaide	Thebarton Theatre	Australia
7 October 2012	Fremantle	Metropolis	Australia
8 October 2012	Fremantle	Metropolis (Under 18's performance)	Australia
Europe, Leg #6 Support from While She Sleeps and Heights
11 October 2012	Copenhagen	Pumpehuset	Denmark
12 October 2012	Malmö	Debaser	Sweden
13 October 2012	Gothenburg	Sticky Fingers	Sweden
14 October 2012	Stockholm	Debaser Slussen	Sweden
15 October 2012	Oslo	John Dee	Norway
17 October 2012	Antwerp	Trix	Belgium
18 October 2012	Dordrecht	Bibelot	Netherlands
19 October 2012	Hamburg	Knust	Germany
20 October 2012	Poznań	Reset	Poland
21 October 2012	Berlin	Magnet	Germany
22 October 2012	Prague	Nová Chmelnice	Czech Republic
23 October 2012	Schweinfurt	Stattbahnhof	Germany
24 October 2012	Cologne	Essigfabrik	Germany
25 October 2012	Augsburg	Kantine	Germany
26 October 2012	Bratislava	Randal Club	Slovakia
27 October 2012	Budapest	Durer Kert	Hungary
28 October 2012	Ljubljana	Gala Hala	Slovenia
29 October 2012	Vienna	Szene Wien	Austria
30 October 2012	Solothurn	Kofmehl	Switzerland
31 October 2012	Cesena	Vidia Club	Italy
1 November 2012	Milan	Land of Live Club	Italy
3 November 2012	Paris	Trabendo - Damage Festival	France
United Kingdom, Leg #7 Support from Bury Tomorrow, The Acacia Strain and Deez Nuts.
9 November 2012	Southampton	Mo Club	United Kingdom
10 November 2012	London	Alexandra Palace (UK Warped Tour)	United Kingdom
11 November 2012	Birmingham	Institute	United Kingdom
12 November 2012	Manchester	Academy 2	United Kingdom
13 November 2012	Leeds	Met Uni	United Kingdom
14 November 2012	Glasgow	Garage	United Kingdom
15 November 2012	Newcastle	Northumbria Uni	United Kingdom
16 November 2012	Nottingham	Rock City	United Kingdom
17 November 2012	Norwich	Waterfront	United Kingdom

== Production and release ==
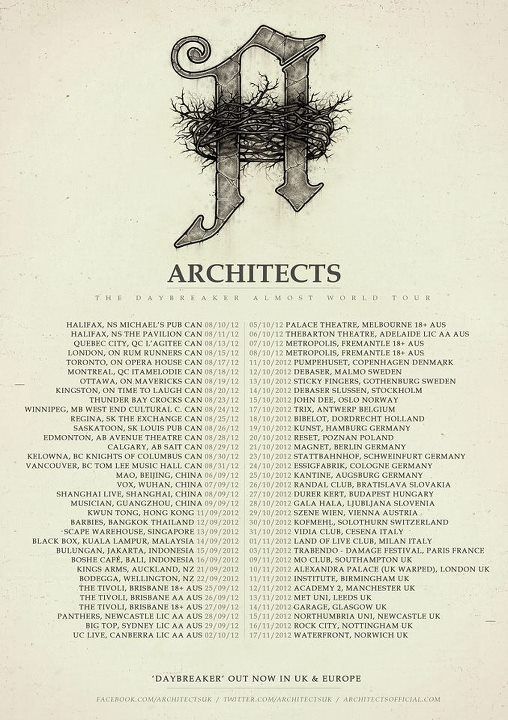
This is the tour poster- created by Architects and publicly posted on the internet- displaying all of the band's tour schedule for the "Daybreaker Almost world tour".

In mid April 2013, the band released a trailer for the documentary The band decided to self-release the film since they had left their record label Century Media and the funding for the film was done through a community funded project on indiegogo. For the crowd funding campaign the band used a target budget of £30,000 to measure the demand for the film saying "We don't know whether to manufacture 10 or 10,000 copies of this DVD/Blu Ray and this campaign will give us a solid idea of the numbers we should be looking to create". They used a community fund project to "cut the middle man out but also to allows us to gain an idea of demand". The contributions to the project ranged, with £1 being to have the persons names in the credits to £50 for tickets to watch the film debut at a cinema in Brighton.

During the campaign- once the target amount had been surpassed- Architects posted a song clip of a new song "Black Blood" online to tease the release of Daybreaker's deluxe version. With the closing of the crowd funding campaign 1907 copies of the copies of the film were purchased in digital, DVD and Blu-ray formats and a total funding of £40,891 was achieved.

The film debuted at the Brighton cinema Duke of Yorks on 8 June.
