= Lakeview (band) =

American rock band

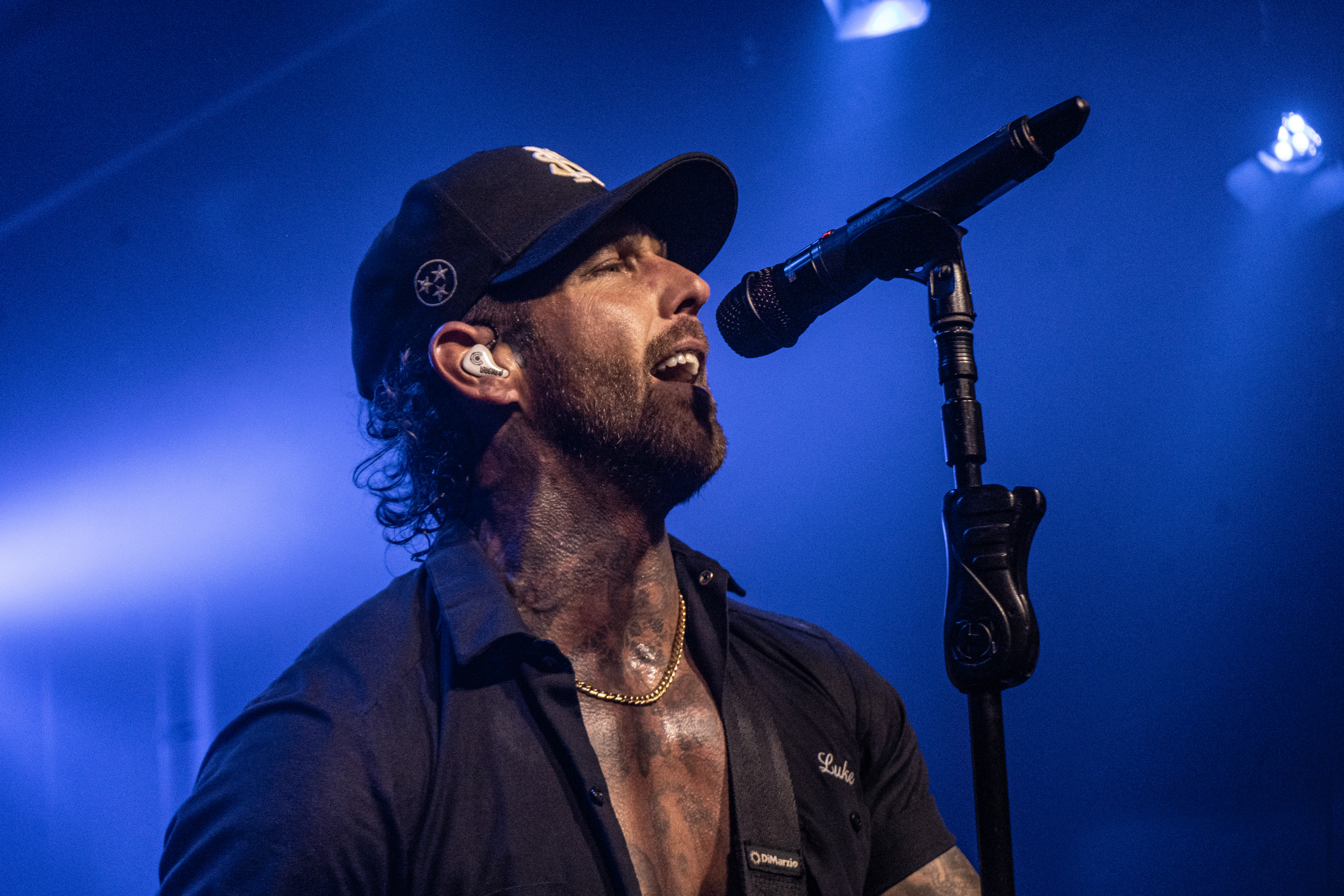
- Luke Healy performing with Lakeview in October 2025

Background information
- Origin: Pittsburgh, Pennsylvania, U.S.
- Genres: Country rock; hard rock
- Years active: 2019-present
- Labels: Gravel Road, Riser House, Spinefarm, Snakefarm
- Members: Jesse Denaro; Luke Healy

Lakeview is an American country rock duo originally from suburban Pittsburgh, Pennsylvania. Consisting of Jesse Denaro and Luke Healy, the two formed the project in 2019 and later relocated to Nashville, Tennessee. The duo signed a publishing deal with Ace High Music in May 2024 and released their self-titled debut-album in September of that year.

== Discography ==
- Lakeview (September 13, 2024)

=== Extended Plays ===
- Small-Town-famous (2021)

=== Singles ===
- "Money Where Your Mouth Is" (2024) Peaked at #39 in Mainstream Rock Chart.
- "Wreck My Night" (2026) Peaked at #18 in Hot Hard Rock Songs.
