= Royale Lynn =

American musician

- Born: Ontario, Canada
- Genres: Hard rock; heavy metal
- Instruments: Vocals; guitar
- Years active: 2021-present
- Label: Epitaph Records

Royale Lynn is a Canadian musician. Relocating from Canada to Nashville, Tennessee at 21, she started her career as a country artist before transitioning nearly a decade later to heavy metal music that appealed to her in her childhood. As of June 2025, when she released her debut album, she had over 76 million streams.

== Career ==
Born in Aylmer, Ontario, Lynn relocated to Nashville at the age of 21 in order to seek a career as a country music artist. In 2023, she released a musical genre crossing single, "Six Feet Deep," that topped Billboard's Hard Rock Digital Sales chart and inspired a lot of conversation about her genre. A self-proclaimed "metalhead growing up in the country," with influences ranging from Simple Plan to Sum 41, Lynn transitioned from country to metal. In 2024, she signed to Epitaph Records, according to Blabbermouth.net, taking the United States "by storm." In addition to appearing at Louder than Life and Aftershock, Lynn performed with Skillet and Seether while preparing to release her debut album, titled Black Magic, on June 27, 2025. The album was inspired by Lynn's struggles with mental health. Following the release of her debut, Soundboard opined that, while the album was "unimpressive," Lynn's interest lies in her transitioning from country music to metal, rather than the more typical inverse. In a more positive take, Blabbermouth.net wrote that Lynn "proves her prowess for bridging the gap between two seemingly different worlds." Kerrang! said that the album "conjures some moments of magic."

== Discography ==
- Black Magic (2025)

=== Singles ===
List of singles, with selected chart positions, showing year released and album name
Title	Year	Peak chart positions		Albums
Title	Year	US Main. Rock	US Hard Rock Digi.	Albums
"Rocket Man"	2021	—	—	Non-album singles
"Workin' on My Country"	2022	—	—	Non-album singles
"Bitchin'"	2022	—	—	Non-album singles
"Runs in the Water"	2023	—	—	Non-album singles
"Redneck Rockstar"	2023	—	—	Non-album singles
"If We All Drove Trucks"	2023	—	—	Non-album singles
"Six Feet Deep"	2024	35	1	Non-album singles
"Death Wish" (feat. Danny Worsnop)	2024	27	—	Black Magic
"Sacrifice"	2024	—	—	Black Magic
"Battleground"	2025	—	—	Black Magic
"Greed"	2025	—	—	Black Magic
"E.V.I.L."	2025	—	—	Black Magic

=== Music videos ===
Title	Year	Director
"Runs in the Water"	2023	Unknown
"Six Feet Deep"	2024	Max Moore
"Death Wish"	2024	Dylan Hryciuk
"Sacrifice"	2024	Jon Vulpine
"Greed"	2025	Scott Hansen
"WTCH"	2025	Unknown
"Altar"	2026	Maya Sassoon
