= Loveless (band) =

American rock band

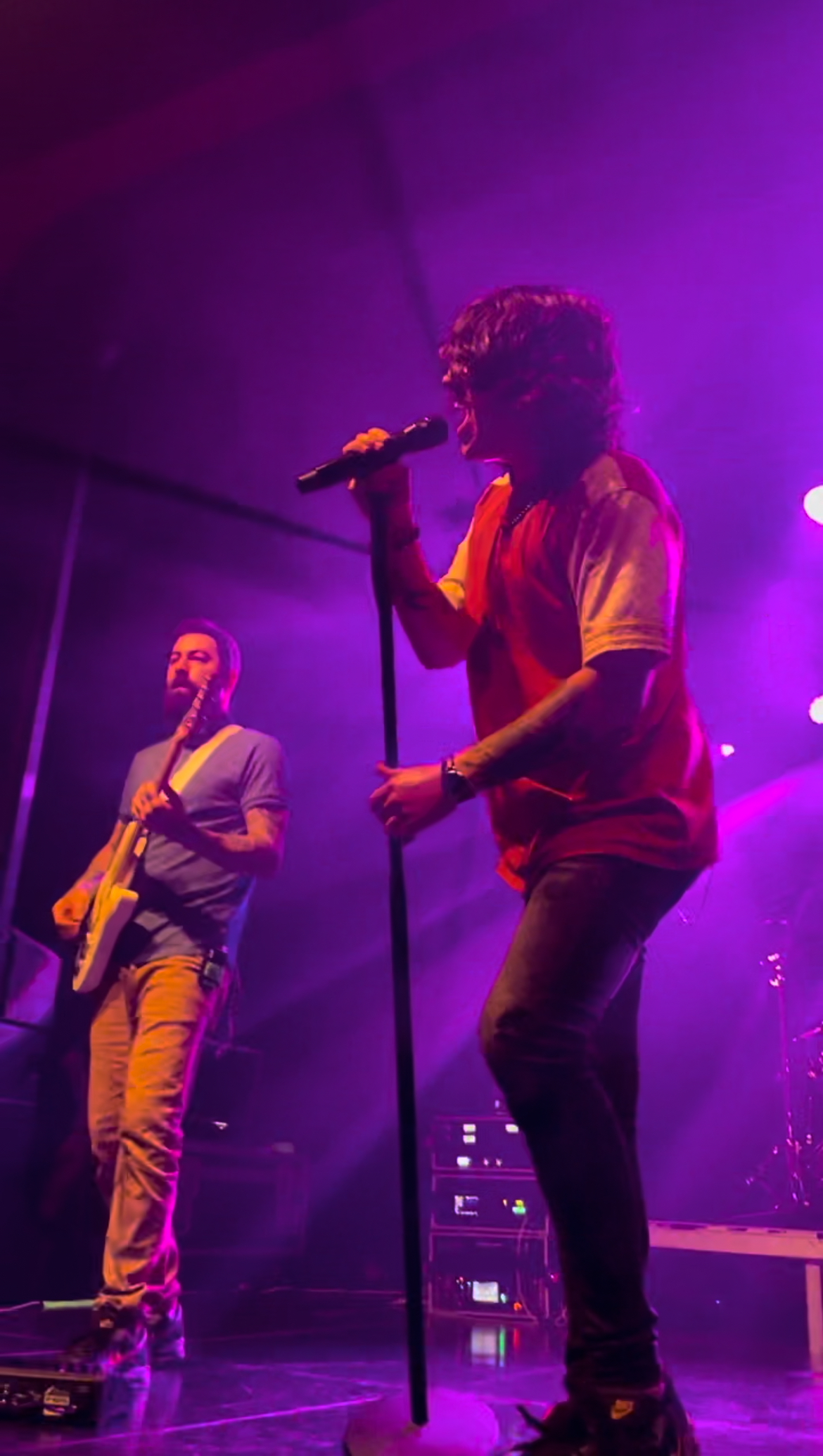
- Loveless live in Berlin 2023

Background information
- Origin: Los Angeles, California, USA
- Genres: Pop-punk; alternative rock; emo
- Years active: 2020–present
- Labels: Rise; Big Noise
- Members: Julian Comeau
- Past members: Dylan Tirapelli-Jamail
- Website: www.thisisloveless.com

Loveless is an American rock music project consisting of Julian Comeau, and formerly a duo. The duo met in 2019.

The band released their debut album, Loveless I, as independent artists on June 4, 2021, with 12 original songs and one cover of "Exile" by Taylor Swift. Their first EP, End of an era, was released on September 16, 2022 and consisted of 7 original songs and two covers: "Middle of the Night" and "Running Up That Hill". They signed with BMG and Rise Records in 2023. After domestic abuse allegations resurfaced against Julian Comeau, the band's I Love It When It Tours Tour and subsequent sophomore album, Loveless II, were suspended, followed by band member Dylan Tirapelli-Jamail removing all mention of the band from his official web pages.

In 2025, Loveless, as a solo project of Comeau, released a single titled "Step Back".

== History ==
=== Formation and debut album Loveless I ===
Comeau and Tirapelli-Jamail first met in 2019, and released their first single, "Better", in April 2020. Musical artist Nick Morzov, a friend of Tirapelli-Jamail, has been known to assist with the mixing and producing of many Loveless songs.

Their debut album, Loveless I, was formed through a lot of initial work by Comeau, where Tirapelli-Jamail was brought on to create live guitar and drum recordings. Tirapelli-Jamail wrote the music for the original song "Control", which Comeau added vocals to afterwards. The duo expressed how well they work together, and neither of them felt the need to explicitly announce who did what on which song.

The album graphics and logo were originally created by Kalie Wolfe from the band RIVALS. The band logo was further designed by tattoo artist Tim Hastings.

=== Covers ===
The band achieved notoriety on TikTok by sharing pop-punk covers of trending or famous songs, including "Happier Than Ever" by Billie Eilish, "About Damn Time" by Lizzo, "Middle of the Night" by Elley Duhé, "Charlie Be Quiet!" by Charlie Puth and "Unholy" by Sam Smith and Kim Petras. Due to the late release of the widely used "Unholy" sound on the app and the early cover by Loveless, there was some confusion on whose song it was. Lizzo posted a video reply in reaction to the band's cover of "About Damn Time", which helped the band gain a larger following. Following the success of the covers and increased recognition on social media, the band has been featured regularly on SiriusXM's Octane and on Kerrang Radio.

=== End of an era ===
The band's second release was an EP titled End of an era. The record's title alluded to the end of the era of covers posted on TikTok. Comeau noted that "era" is spelled with a lower-case "e" as to not bring a finite end to the covers, but rather shift focus to their original music. Before starting any actual work on the EP, Comeau and Tirapelli-Jamail sat down and sifted through their demo folder of 97 recordings over the course of one week to decide which ones they wanted to develop and eventually release. The duo reportedly now has over one hundred recordings in their demo folder.

=== Loveless II ===
On June 27, 2024, the band announced their second album Loveless II with the release of the single "Heart-Shaped Soul". The band also announced a North American tour, later titled the I Love It When It Tours Tour, with support acts Beauty School Dropout and Julia Wolf.

=== Collapse as a duo ===
On August 14, 2024, the tour was cancelled, after both opening acts had dropped off the tour citing "recent information ... received", which was indicated to be 2018 domestic battery criminal case against Comeau that eventually became a court sentence to time served and probation. The band's management team Cardiff Giant Management, booking agents UTA, Rise Records/BMG, and the band's public relations firm later all told Variety that they had cut ties with the band. Tirapelli-Jamail also removed any mention of the band from his social media profiles, leading to a belief that he quit the group.

== Singles ==
The band signed with Rise Records, owned by BMG, on February 22, 2023. They subsequently released four singles, "I Hope I'm Not Sick", "Drag Me Down", "Picasso", and "Addicted", planned to be on their sophomore album, Loveless II. The latter single, "Addicted", was released on Valentine's Day 2024, and not long after the song was heard on multiple radio stations, including BBC Radio 1. The music videos of the singles all start where the previous one ends, creating a cinematic continuation between the songs.

On April 19, 2024, "I Love It When It Rains" became the 5th single off Loveless II and their fastest original song to reach one million streams on Spotify.

== Tours ==
=== The Debut Live Experience ===
Loveless toured across the United States in fall 2022, with one show in London, UK, in January 2023. Just before the first show in Atlanta, GA, Comeau jumped a barrier and fell, which has since become an inside joke among fans to beat up barricades on his behalf.

=== World Tour 2023 ===
Loveless completed their second tour and first international tour in 2023, performing all across North America, Australia, and Europe.

=== Sneaking Out of Heaven ===
Just after the end of their international tour, the band announced that they would be opening for Waterparks' Sneaking Out of Heaven tour in North America in spring 2024. The band later announced several headliner shows between tour dates with Waterparks.

=== I Love It When It Tours Tour ===
With the release of the single "I Love It When It Rains", Loveless announced a new headline tour across North America to begin in September 2024, but the tour was cancelled in August 2024.
