= Skyharbor =

Indian/American progressive metal band

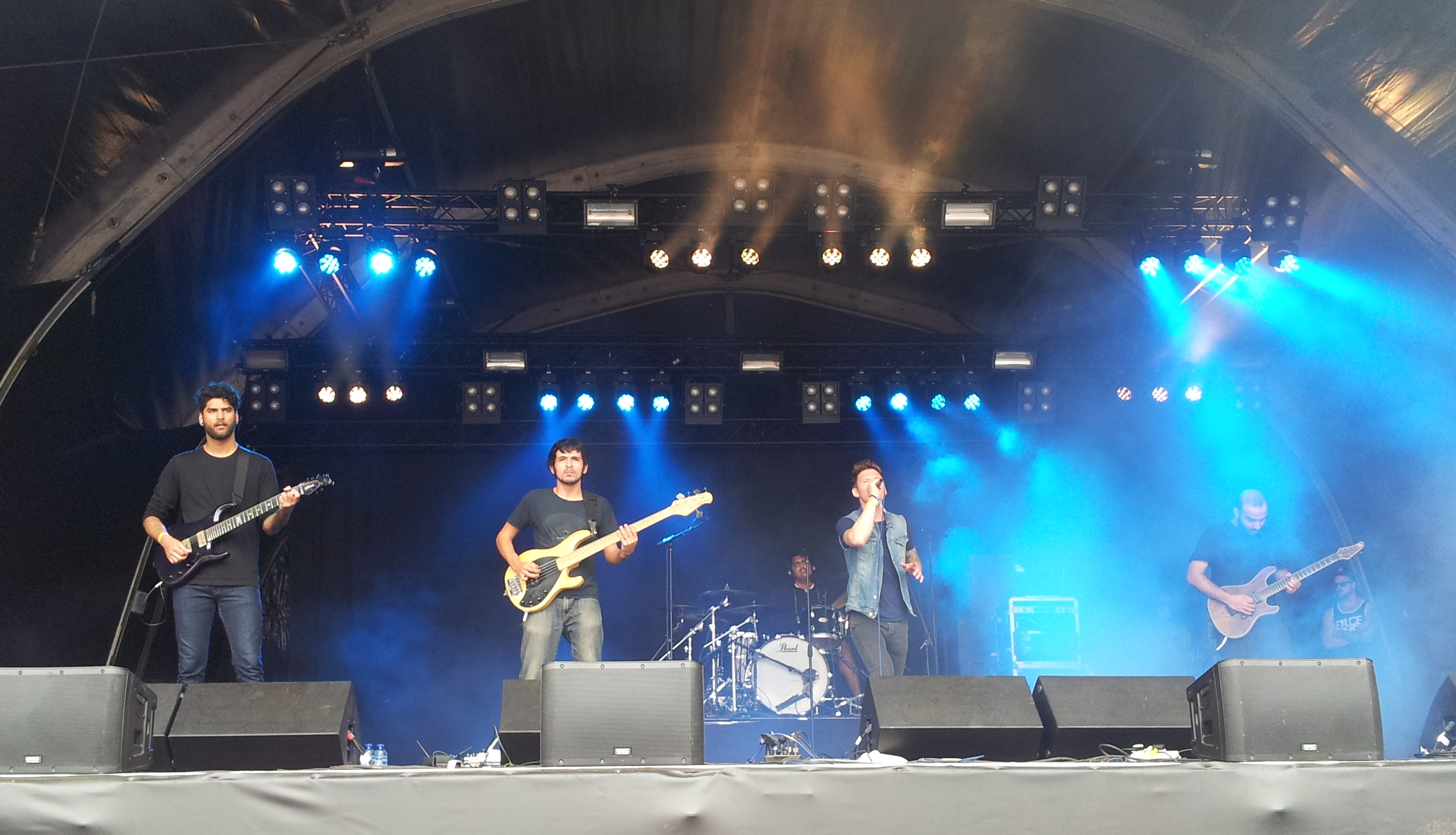
- Skyharbor at Graspop Metal Meeting 2014

Background information
- Origin: India/United States
- Genre: Progressive metal
- Years active: 2010–2020
- Labels: Basick, eOne/Good Fight
- Members: Keshav Dhar; Eric Emery; Devesh Dayal; Krishna Jhaveri
- Past members: Nikhil Rufus Raj; Anup Sastry; Daniel Tompkins; Aditya Ashok
- Website: skyharborband.com

Skyharbor was an Indian/American progressive metal band with members from New Delhi and Mumbai, India; and Cleveland, Ohio, US.

== History ==
The band was initially guitarist Keshav Dhar's studio project, before TesseracT vocalist Daniel Tompkins contacted Dhar with an interest in collaborating with him in October 2010. Around the same time, Dhar and Maryland-based drummer Anup Sastry (Jeff Loomis, Intervals), who had uploaded several videos of himself performing Skyharbor songs to his YouTube channel, discussed the possibility of taking the material to the live stage. Roping in bassist Nikhil Rufus Raj, the band performed for the first time as an instrumental three-piece at the 2011 Bacardi NH7 Weekender festival.

=== Blinding White Noise (2011–2013) ===
After signing with Basick Records, the band released its debut album Blinding White Noise: Illusion and Chaos on 23 April 2012 worldwide as a double-disc album (Illusion and Chaos), featuring vocalists Tompkins and Sunneith Revankar from Bhayanak Maut on each disc respectively. The album consisted almost entirely of refined versions of Dhar's early demos. In an interview, drummer Anup Sastry described the band as "all Keshav at first, he never actually planned to take the music live. The pieces just kind of fell into place one by one. I remember asking him if he would be ok with me making a couple of Youtube videos for a few of his tunes. It basically just went from there." The tracks "Catharsis" and "Celestial" also featured guest solos by Marty Friedman of Megadeth fame. Not long after the release of the album, Skyharbor announced Daniel Tompkins as their official lead singer.

In May 2012 they supported American groove metal band Lamb of God on the India date of their 2012 world tour, after being handpicked by drummer Chris Adler. This show saw the addition of Goddess Gagged guitarist Devesh Dayal to the line-up. Adler went on to praise Skyharbor in an interview with Rolling Stone magazine. Skyharbor made their debut European appearance with an exclusive show at Euroblast Festival in Cologne, Germany. The band capped off a successful year with two headline shows in India in December.

Skyharbor performed on the 2nd day of the 2013 UK Tech Metal Festival as main support to headliners Veil of Maya, followed by a mini-tour of Russia with Monuments and TesseracT. Skyharbor quickly followed this up with a second appearance at Euroblast Festival and their first UK headline tour in October 2013, before taking a break from live shows to record their second studio album.

=== Guiding Lights (2013–2015) ===
In late 2013, Skyharbor announced that Nikhil Rufus Raj had amicably left the group, and was replaced by Goddess Gagged bassist Krishna Jhaveri, who had filled in on bass for the October European/UK tour. The band stated they would be taking a break from live performances to focus on recording their follow-up to Blinding White Noise, and that the writing process was a much more collaborative process than on the debut.

Skyharbor continued performing at summer festivals in 2014 when they performed at Download Festival and Graspop Metal Meeting, along with a short run of headline shows in Europe where they played a considerable amount of new material. The new songs showcased a style with a much greater emphasis on progressive arrangements and ambient soundscapes than their earlier guitar riff-driven work.

In June 2014, Skyharbor announced that they would be crowd-funding the production of their second album with PledgeMusic, and working with Australian producer Forrester Savell (Karnivool, The Butterfly Effect, Dead Letter Circus) as well as animator Jess Cope (Steven Wilson, Devin Townsend) for a music video. The fundraising campaign was a success, with the target being achieved in a month. During the course of the campaign, the band released the first single and video from their second album titled 'Evolution'. The Jess Cope-directed video for 'Patience' was released three months later.

Skyharbor released their second album Guiding Lights worldwide via Basick Records on 10 November 2014 and followed it up with a launch tour in India, capping off with a headline set at the NH7 Weekender festival, 3 years after making their live debut opening the same stage.

=== Sunshine Dust (2015-present) ===
In March 2015, the band embarked on an extensive 29-date Europe and UK co-headlining tour with Australian post-rock outfit sleepmakeswaves and Polish group Tides From Nebula. On 23 June 2015 Skyharbor announced via their Facebook page that they had amicably parted ways with drummer Anup Sastry. His full-time replacement was announced as Aditya Ashok. On 29 June, it was announced that Tompkins had stepped down as the group's frontman as well, citing touring and scheduling difficulties. He was replaced by Cleveland native Eric Emery. In the summer of 2015, it was announced that Skyharbor would be making their North American debut on TesseracT's 'Polaris' tour, alongside The Contortionist and ERRA.

The band premiered 'Out Of Time', the lead single off the as-yet untitled third album, on 27 August 2015. This was followed by the release of the video single 'Blind Side', featuring live performance and travel footage from their North America tour with TesseracT and The Contortionist. A video for a third single, 'Chemical Hands', was released on 23 September 2016. Skyharbor followed this up with extensive touring, with headline runs across Europe and India in October and November 2016, and a breakout European support tour with Deftones in April 2017.

In an interview in early 2017, Dhar announced that the band's third album titled Sunshine Dust would be released in the late summer. However, on 19 November, the band confirmed that they were unhappy with the first sessions and would be re-recording the entire album, with an expected release date in 2018. On 18 January 2018, Skyharbor signed a worldwide deal with eOne Music & Good Fight Music. Sunshine Dust was released on 7 September 2018. The band followed up the release with extensive touring in support of Tremonti, 10 Years, and RED. The band has been on a hiatus since 2020, with no activity on their social media pages since then.

== Musical style ==
Skyharbor plays a style of progressive metal drawing elements of the orchestration of Oceansize and Karnivool and the dream pop influenced alternative metal of the Deftones. There is considerable emphasis given to heavily layered ambient guitars and vocal harmonies. On the first two LPs, Daniel Tompkins rarely employed any harsh vocals, instead focusing on layered harmonies and occasional pitched screams. On Sunshine Dust, Eric Emery employed largely lead-focused clean singing but was more generous in his use of harsh vocals, as evident on the lead single 'Dissent'.

== Members ==
=== Final line-up ===
- Keshav Dhar – guitar (2010–2020)
- Devesh Dayal – guitar (2012–2020)
- Krishna Jhaveri – bass (2013–2020)
- Eric Emery – vocals (2015–2020)

=== Former members ===
- Nikhil Rufus Raj – bass (2011–2013)
- Daniel Tompkins – vocals (Tesseract, White Moth Black Butterfly, Zeta) (2010-2015)
- Anup Sastry – drums (2011–2015, touring 2019)
- Aditya Ashok - drums (2015–2019)

=== Session members ===
- Sunneith Revankar – vocals (performed on disc 2 of Blinding White Noise: Illusion and Chaos)

== Discography ==
Albums

- Blinding White Noise: Illusion and Chaos (2012)
- Guiding Lights (2014)
- Sunshine Dust (2018)

Singles

- "Celestial" (2011)
- "Maeva" (2012)
- "Evolution" (2014)
- "Patience" (2014)
- "Out of Time" (2015)
- "Blind Side" (2016)
- "Chemical Hands" (2016)
- "Dim" (2018)
- "Dissent" (2018)
- "Sunshine Dust" (2018)

== Videography ==
- "Evolution" (2014)
- "Patience" (2014)
- "Blind Side" (2016)
- "Chemical Hands" (2016)
- "Dim" (2018)
- "Dissent" (2018)

== Tours and festivals ==
- Bacardi NH7 Weekender, India, 2011
- Alive Festival (main support to Lamb of God), India, 2012
- Euroblast Festival, Germany, 2012
- UK Tech Fest (main support to Veil of Maya), UK, 2013
- Altered State Release Tour (with Monuments and TesseracT), Russia, 2013
- Blinding White Noise Tour (headline), UK, 2013
- Download Festival, UK, 2014
- Dissonance Festival, Italy, 2014
- Evolution Tour (headline), Europe, 2014
- Graspop Metal Meeting, Belgium, 2014
- Bacardi NH7 Weekender, India, 2014
- Guiding Lights Launch Tour (headline), India, 2014
- 'The Feel Trip' European Co-Headline Tour (with sleepmakeswaves and Tides From Nebula), 2015
- Polaris Tour, USA and Canada (with ERRA, The Contortionist and TesseracT), 2015
- Europe & UK tour (headline with Sithu Aye and Modern Day Babylon), 2016
- Gore Europe Tour (with Deftones), 2017
- Clairvoyant North America (support for The Contortionist and Silent Planet with Strawberry Girls), 2018
- Progfest Australia (with The Ocean and Monuments) 2019

== See also ==
- Indian rock
- Kryptos (band)
- Bhayanak Maut
- Nicotine (band)
- Inner Sanctum (band)
- Demonic Resurrection
