= Bocksten Man =

Medieval bog body found in Sweden

Coordinates: 57°07′00″N 12°34′29″E

- Bockstensmannen
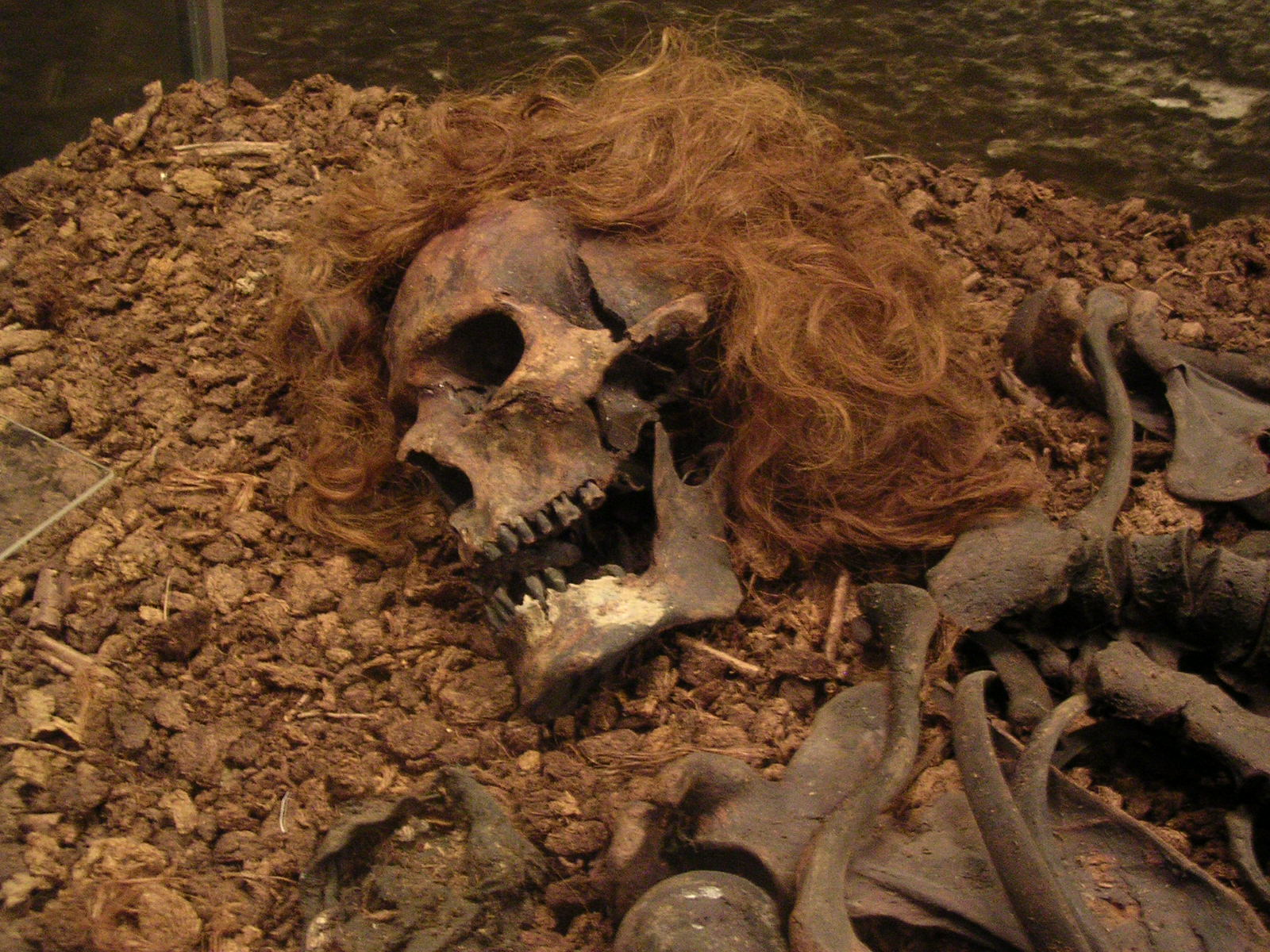
- Died: (aged 25-60); Rolfstorp, Halland County, Halland, Sweden
- Cause of death: Homicide
- Body discovered: 1934 (shoe sole); 22-23 June 1936 (skeleton)
- Resting place: Halland Museum of Cultural History, Varberg, Halland County, Sweden
- Era: fl. c. 1250-1520
- Known for: His well-preserved remains
- Height: 170–180 cm (5 ft 7 in – 5 ft 11 in)

The Bocksten Man (Swedish: Bockstensmannen) is the well-preserved remains of a medieval man discovered in a peat bog in Halland County, Sweden, in 1936. He died in the mid-14th century and was placed in a shallow lake, where his body was secured to the lake bed with wooden stakes before the lake gradually developed into a bog. The conditions preserved parts of his body, including his hair and several internal organs, together with an unusually complete set of medieval clothing.

The Bocksten Man is one of the best-preserved medieval bog bodies in Europe. His surviving wool garments, leather shoes and other personal items provide archaeological evidence for clothing and everyday material culture in 14th-century Sweden. Later forensic examination found evidence that he had been struck several times in the head before his body was deposited in the lake. His remains, clothing and a modern facial reconstruction are exhibited at the Halland Museum of Cultural History in Varberg, Sweden.

== Discovery ==
The individual now known as the Bocksten Man was discovered on 22 June 1936 in a peat bog near the Bocksten farm, in the parish of Rolfstorp in Halland, Sweden. Albert Johansson and his children were gathering peat when his 11-year-old son, Thure Johansson, noticed pieces of cloth and bone lying on the surface of the bog. They had been pulled up by a harrow, a farm tool being used to work the peat. At first, the children thought they had found the remains of an animal. When they began digging by hand, however, they uncovered more bones and pieces of clothing.

The Johansson family covered the exposed remains and left them undisturbed overnight. The next morning, 23 June, they reported the discovery to the local police. Officials and a doctor from the nearby town of Varberg came to the bog and confirmed that the remains were human. Parts of the man's clothing were still in place, and wooden poles could be seen with the body.

Johan Albert Sandklef (1893–1990), director of Varberg County Museum, then took charge of the investigation. On 24 June, two days after the body was found, Sandklef visited the bog with several specialists. Among them was Swedish naturalist and geologist Lennart von Post (1884–1951), a professor at Stockholm University.

There had been earlier finds in the same bog. The Bocksten farm had been established nearby in the 1880s, about 50 years before the discovery of the body, and the wetland was later drained and used for peat gathering. A leather shoe had previously been recovered from the bog and given to the Varberg County Museum. In the summer of 1934, another shoe sole was found there, two years before the Bocksten Man's remains were recognized.

== Condition and preservation ==
The upper parts of the man had passed through the harrow and were badly damaged while the lower parts were intact. The man was 170–180 centimetres (5 ft 7 in – 5 ft 11 in) tall and of slender build. There is an injury covering about 8 by 5 centimetres (3 in × 2 in) on the right side of the cranium. Of the inner organs, parts of the lungs, liver, and brain as well as cartilage are preserved. The man had been impaled to the lake bed with two poles; one of oak that hit his heart and one of beech which went through his back.

== Clothing and associated items ==
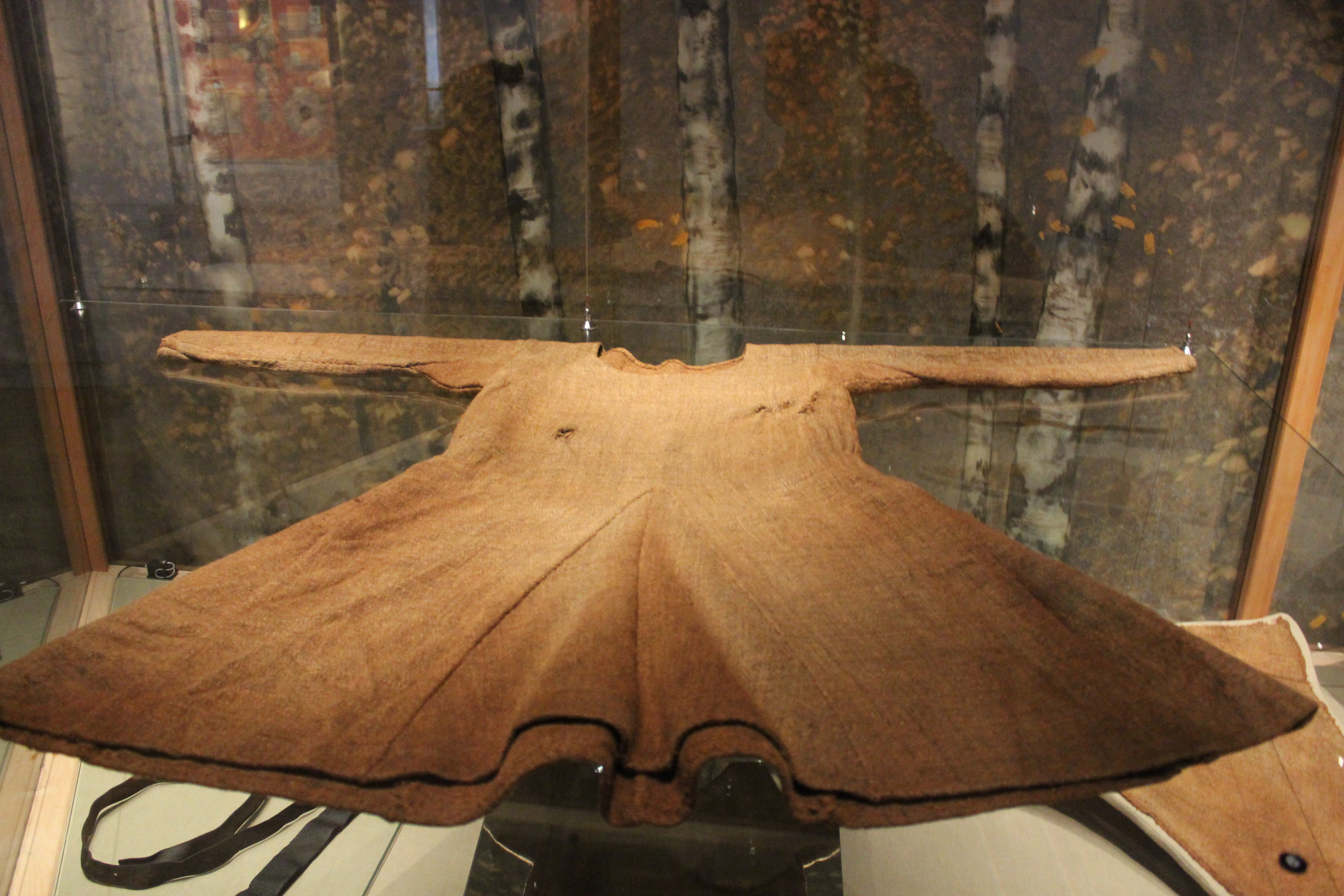
The wool tunic recovered with the remains of Bocksten Man.

The Bocksten Man was buried in a well preserved set of mid 14th century clothing. His garments were made from wadmal, a dense, home woven wool fabric that was widely used for practical outerwear. The textiles show minimal wear, indicating that they were relatively new at the time of burial.

He was wearing a gugel, a pointed hood used as both head covering and neck protection, consistent with common fashion in the period. The hood had a 90-centimetre (35 in) long and 2-centimetre (0.79 in) wide liripipe ("tail"). Over this he wore a wool mantel with an opening that allowed the right arm to move freely. A long wool tunic formed the main body garment, secured with a leather belt that held two knives and a small leather object.

The leather sheath found with him was 40 millimetres (1.6 in) wide and 62 millimetres (2.4 in) long, composed of three layers with a combined saltire and St George's Cross (thus giving a pattern similar to the Union Jack) carved on the outer layer. On the inner layer, a similar pattern was carved, though this time a pole was added to the symbol.

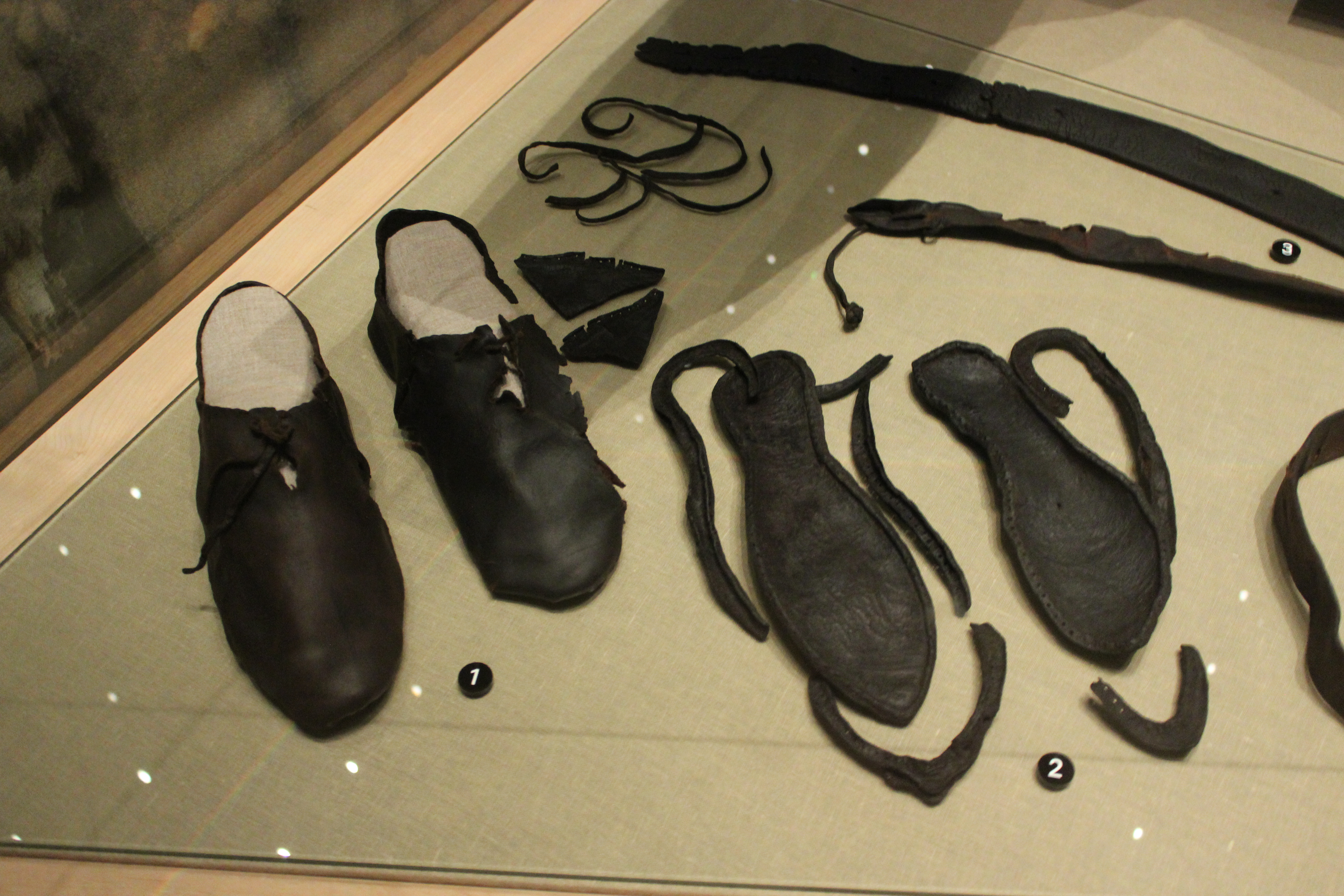
Leather shoes recovered with the remains of Bocksten Man.

Instead of trousers he wore wool hose, which were held up by leather straps attached to an inner belt beneath the tunic. His footwear consisted of flat soled leather shoes and cloth foot wraps made from repurposed textile fragments.

Although the clothing was of good quality, the materials were locally produced and not the imported fabrics associated with the nobility. The combination of well made but non elite garments suggests that the Bocksten Man belonged to a middling social group, possibly connected to service or skilled work in a household or at a site such as Varberg Castle.

== Scientific study ==
Several people have evaluated the finding, among them museum director Johan Albert Sandklef, Gunnel Margareta Nockert of Uppsala University, and historian Owe Wennerholm. All three have written books regarding their findings.

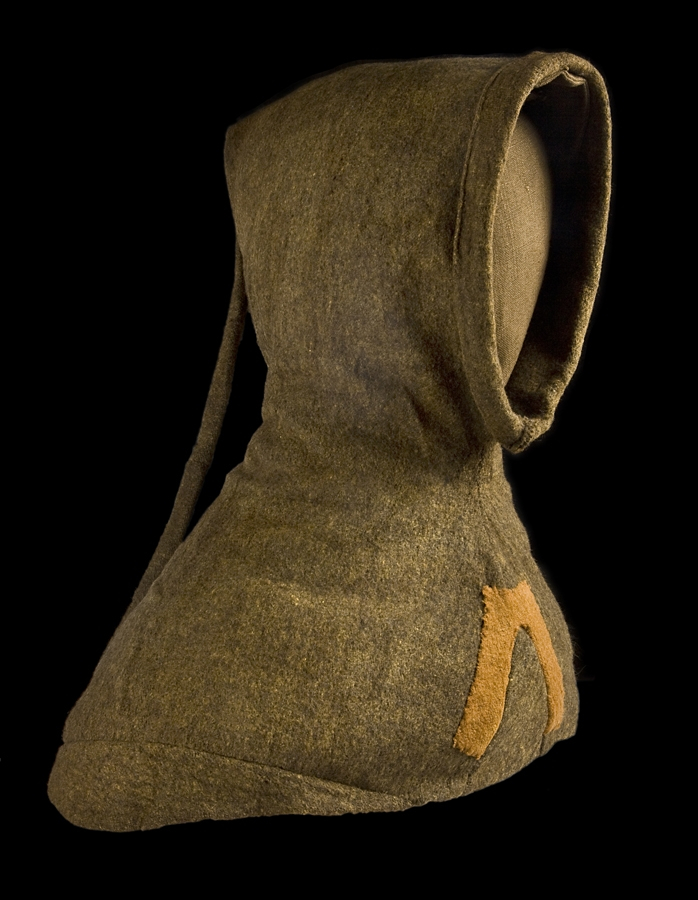
The wool hood recovered with the remains of Bocksten Man.

The Bocksten Man is generally dated to the medieval period. According to the Halland Museum of Cultural History, his clothing, especially the type of hood and tunic he wore, matches styles that were common in the mid 1300s. These garments, and the way they were made, are strong indicators that he lived during this time.

A radiocarbon test of a textile sample was carried out in the late 1980s. The Varberg Museum reports that the results show a 68 percent probability that the material dates between 1290 and 1410, and a 95 percent probability that it falls between 1290 and 1430. These results fit well with the stylistic dating suggested by the clothing. The museum also notes that bog environments and earlier conservation methods may affect the precision of radiocarbon testing, but the overall range still supports a medieval date.

Osteological analysis indicates that the man was likely between 30 and 35 years old at the time of his death. This estimate is based on dental wear, bone growth, and joint surfaces. Both the Halland Museum of Cultural History and the Varberg Museum provide this age range in their public research summaries.

== Cause of death ==
The exact circumstances of Bocksten Man's death remain uncertain, but the available evidence indicates that he was killed during the mid-14th century before his body was deliberately secured to the bottom of a shallow lake that later became a peat bog.

When Bocksten Man was discovered in 1936, his body was held in place by two wooden stakes. An oak stake had passed through his chest and pierced his heart, while a beech stake had been driven through his back. The stakes are interpreted as having secured his body to the lake bed, although the reason for doing so remains uncertain.

For approximately 70 years after the discovery, the sequence of Bocksten Man's injuries remained unclear. In 2006, researchers at Sahlgrenska University Hospital used computed tomography (CT) data to create a plastic model of his skull and reconstruct the injuries. They concluded that he was first struck on the lower jaw, then near the right ear, before receiving a fatal blow to the back of the head.

Although the circumstances of the killing remain unknown nearly 700 years later, evidence from the 1936 recovery and the 2006 forensic reconstruction indicates that Bocksten Man was the victim of homicide before his body was secured beneath the lake.

== Conservation and exhibition ==
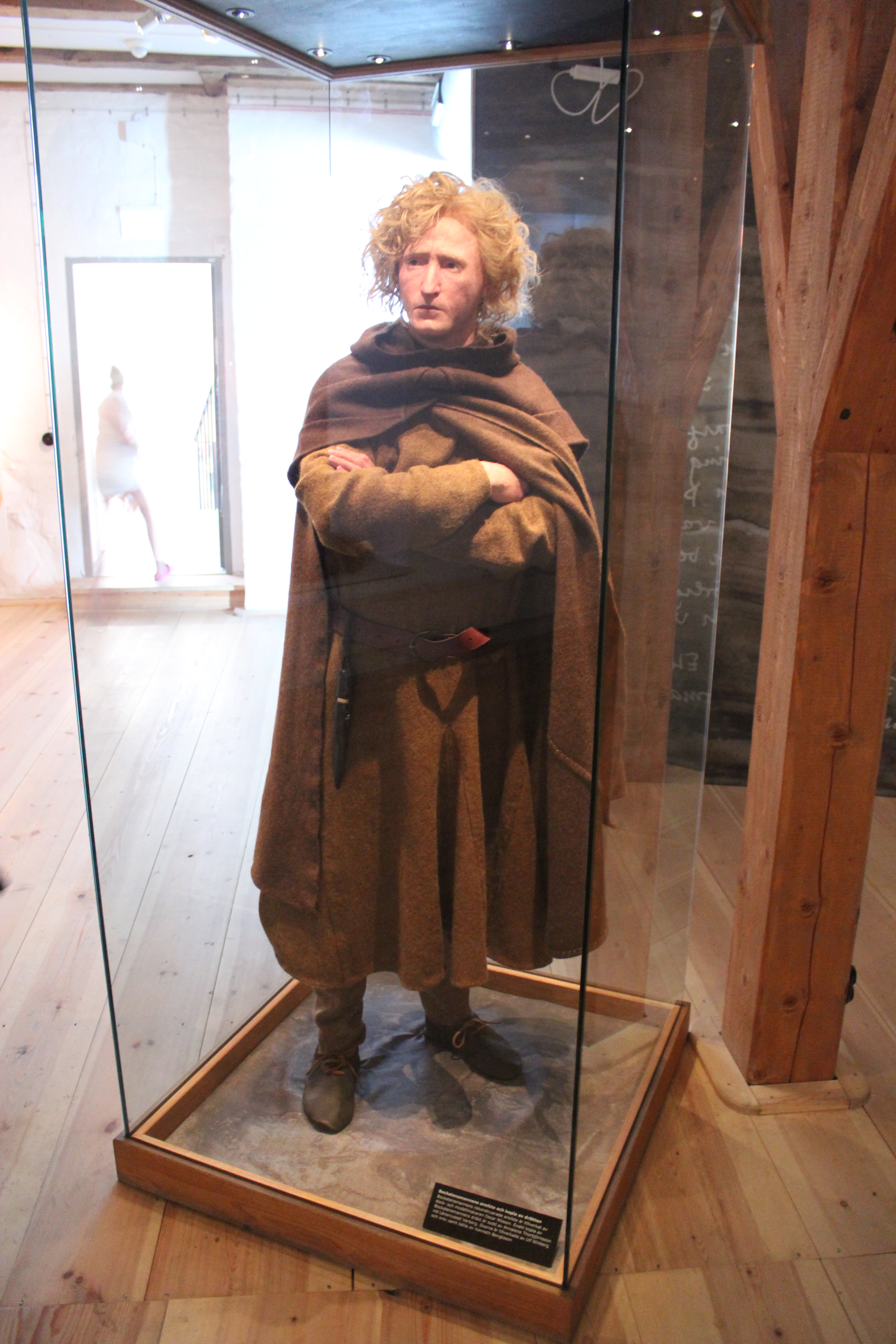
Reconstruction of the clothing worn by Bocksten Man

Following his recovery in June 1936, the Bocksten Man, his clothing and associated objects were taken to Varberg County Museum for conservation and documentation. On 9 July, approximately two weeks after the discovery, curator Gillis Olson and textile historian and archaeologist Agnes Geijer (1898–1989) arrived from the Swedish Museum of National Antiquities to assist museum director Johan Albert Sandklef. Geijer advised on conserving the wool and leather garments, while the remains and associated objects were documented. The Bocksten Man has been exhibited at the museum since 1937.

In May 2005, the museum began creating a facial reconstruction. The skull was recorded by three-dimensional laser scanning, followed by computed tomography imaging in December. The scans were used to produce a nylon replica of the skull, which had been distorted during its centuries in the bog and by earlier handling. Craniofacial surgeon Claes Lauritzen and colleagues at Sahlgrenska University Hospital corrected the distortions in the replica before the reconstruction began.

Forensic artist and archaeologist Oscar Nilsson reconstructed the man's appearance using tissue-depth markers and models of the facial muscles and other soft tissues, which were covered with silicone skin. The facial structure was based on the corrected skull replica, while details including hairstyle, eye colour and expression required artistic interpretation. Dressed in replicas of the mid-14th-century clothing recovered with the body, the completed reconstruction was placed beside the remains in 2006.

In 2021, approximately 85 years after the discovery, the museum opened a redesigned permanent exhibition devoted to the Bocksten Man. New display cases were installed for the body, clothing and associated artefacts, while the exhibition presented the archaeological investigation, medieval life in Halland and the facial reconstruction process.

== Identity ==
A hypothesis has been presented that the person was Simon Gudmundi, the dean of the Diocese of Linköping who died on 12 May 1491. In his 1998 book, Vem var Bockstensmannen? (Who was the Bocksten Man?), Owe Wennerholm reasoned that Gudmundi's name fit with what might be initials found on what might be a micro shield. It is also likely that Gudmundi visited the area. He worked with a group which tried to get Catherine of Vadstena canonized. One of her reputed miracles had taken place in the neighbouring village. Speculation was that he was killed by order of Hemming Gadh (c. 1450–1520) so that Gadh could assume the post of dean of the Diocese of Linköping.

== In pop culture ==
Musician Sebastian Murphy, front man of the Swedish post-punk band Viagra Boys, wrote the song "The Bog Body" for their album Viagr Aboys in response to his girlfriend, artist Moa Romanova, developing a fascination with The Bocksten Man.

== Gallery ==
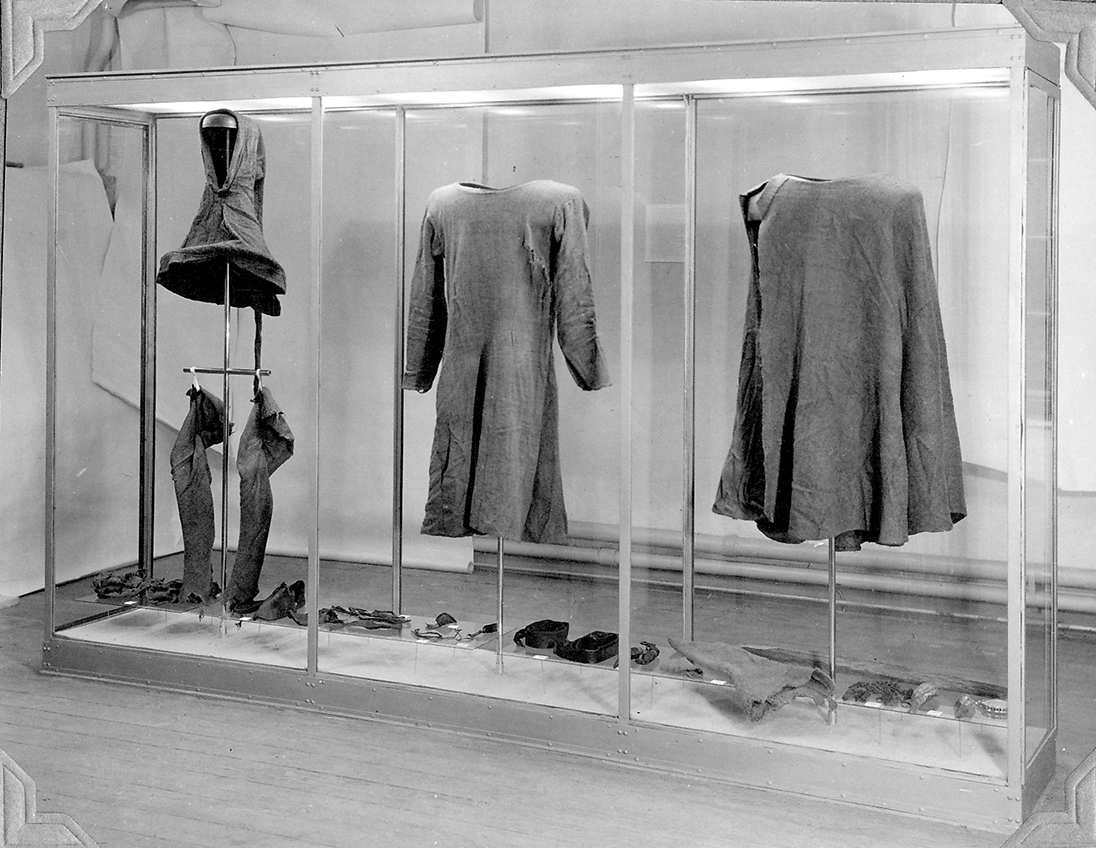
The costume and costume accessories in 1937

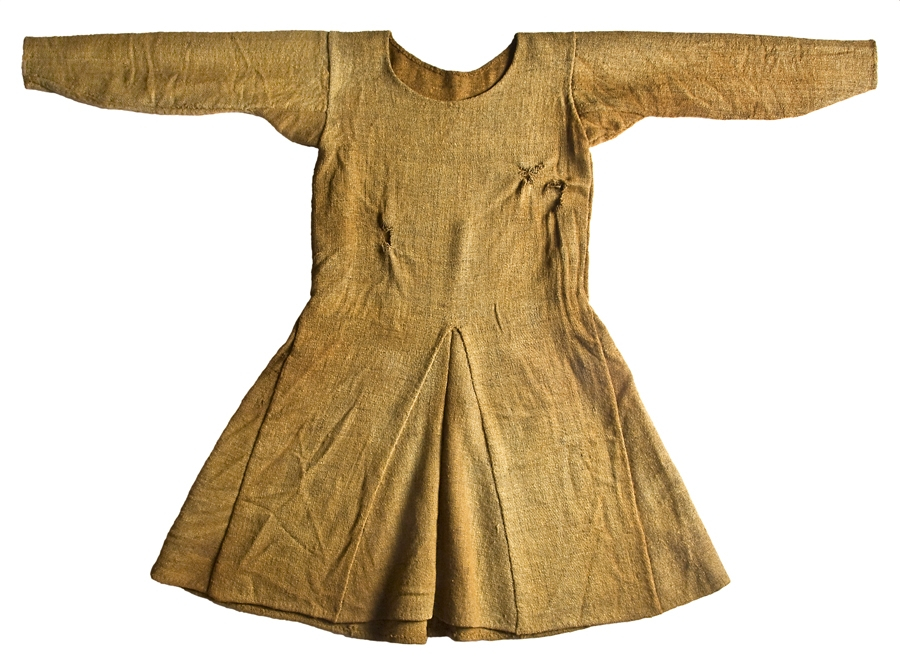
Tunic

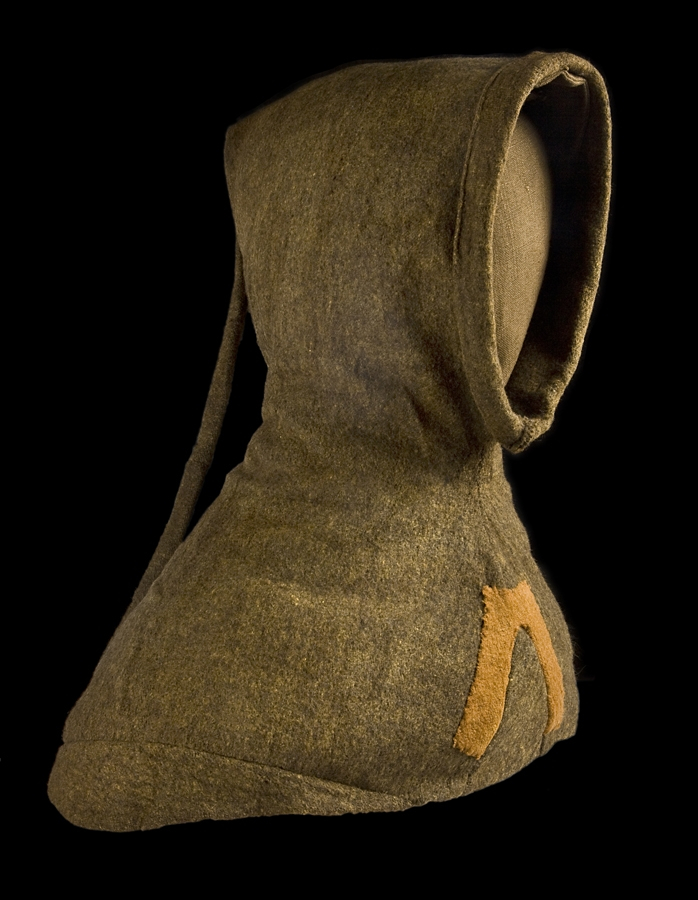
Gugel

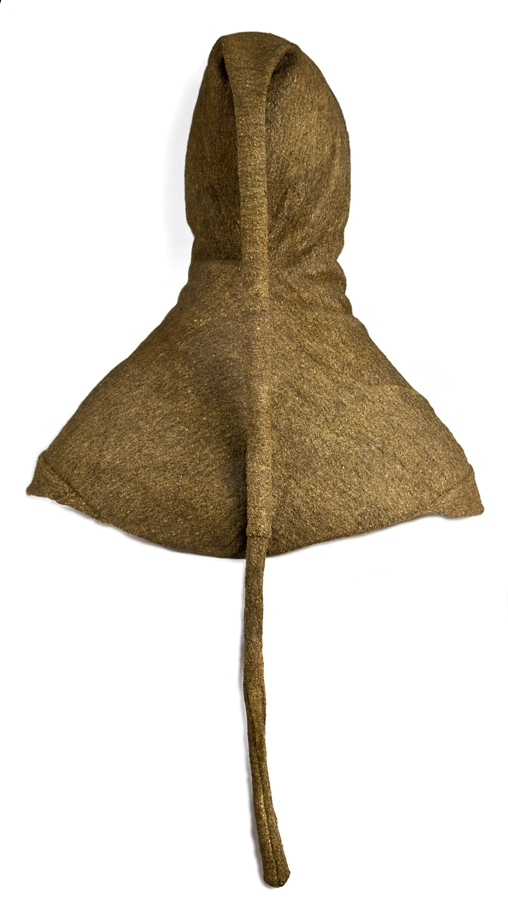
The gugel from behind

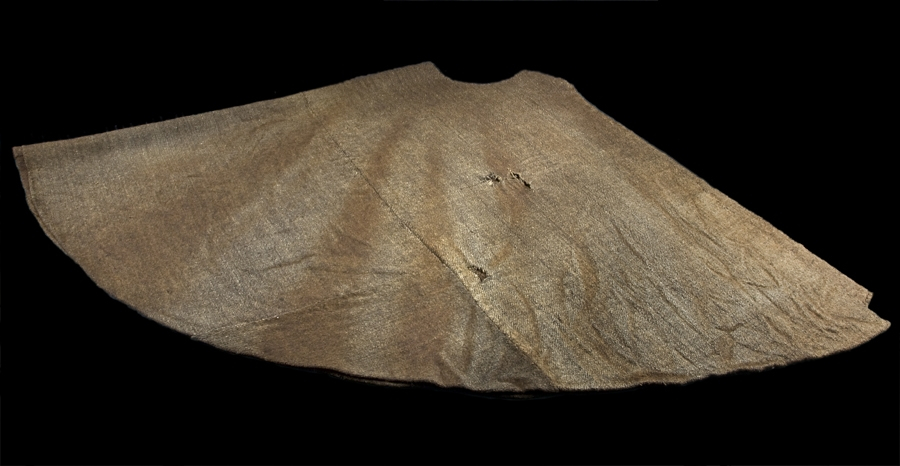
Cape

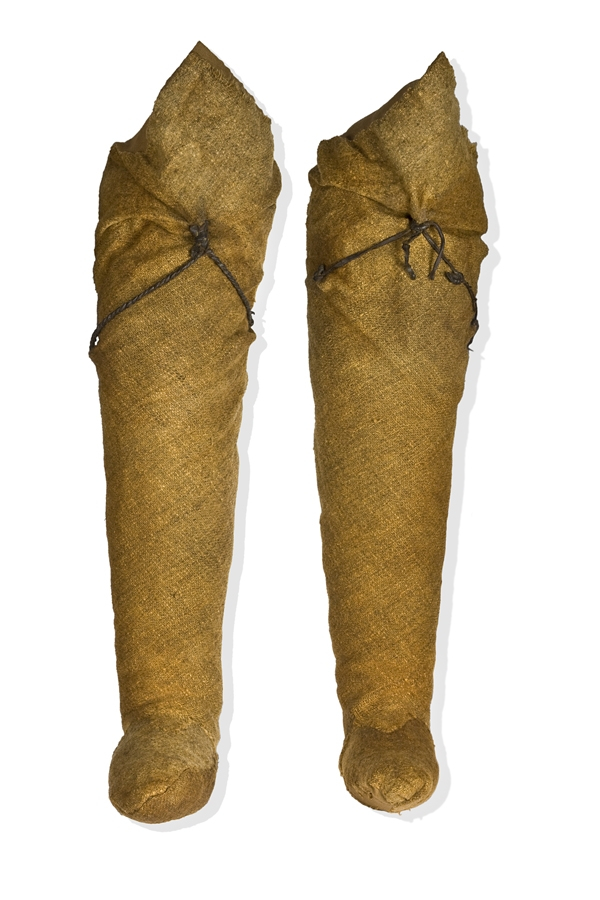
Hoses

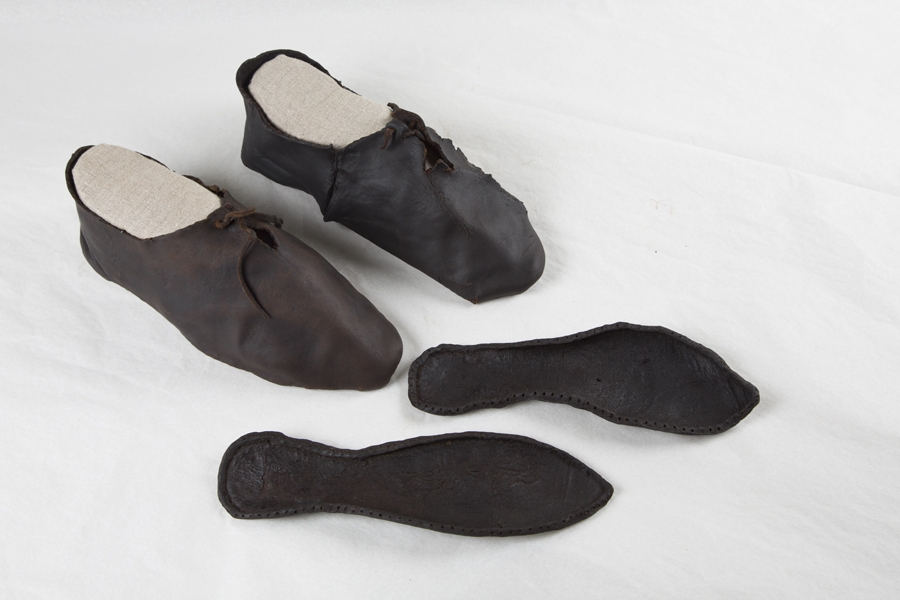
Shoes

== See also ==
- List of Swedish bog bodies

== Sources ==
- Nockert, Margareta (1997). Bockstensmannen och hans Dräkt (in Swedish). Borås: Ländsmuseer, Museet i Varberg och författarna. ISBN 9185720-30-5. ISSN 0083-5536.
- Wennerholm, Owe (1998). Vem var Bockstensmannen? (in Swedish). Fjärås: Bokförlaget Carse. ISBN 91-971061-7-8.
- Sandklef, Albert (1985). Bockstensmannen. Fyndet, konserveringen, dateringen, dräkten. Fabel. ISBN 91-7842-056-3.
