= Cave World =

Studio album by Viagra Boys
- Released: 8 July 2022
- Recorded: Winter 2021–2022
- Studios: Robotberget (Stockholm); Silence Studio (Koppom); Riksmixningverket (Stockholm)
- Genres: Dance-punk; post-punk; new rave; punk rock; art punk; alternative rock
- Length: 40:14
- Label: Year0001
- Producers: Pelle Gunnerfeldt; DJ Haydn

Viagra Boys chronology
Welfare Jazz (2021)	Cave World (2022)	Viagr Aboys (2025)

Singles from Cave World
- 1. "Ain't No Thief" Released: 20 April 2022; 2. "Troglodyte" Released: 10 May 2022; 3. "Punk Rock Loser" Released: 1 June 2022

Cave World is the third studio album by Swedish post-punk band Viagra Boys. It was released on 8 July 2022 through Year0001. A deluxe version of the album was released on 13 January 2023, which featured four more tracks.

== Background and recording ==
Cave World was written during the COVID-19 lockdowns, which serves a basis for much of the album, particularly with songs referring to hesitancy to COVID-19 vaccines. The album also was influenced by the origin of humans during the Paleolithic era (particularly cavemen), conspiracy theories, especially conspiracy theories and misinformation related to the COVID-19 pandemic, and QAnon supporters. Recording took place in winter 2021–22, during a break in touring in support of their previous album, Welfare Jazz (2021).

== Music and composition ==
The album's music style was described by Ross Horton of The Line of Best Fit as a "heady brew of trad punk, post-punk, country and new wave and their look is a combination of unlicensed doorman menace and tracksuit couch slacker". Mark Tremblay described the album as a fusion of post-punk and new rave, and described some of the tracks as venturing into electronica; it featured three short techno interludes: "Cave Hole", "Globe Earth" and "Human Error", courtesy of producer DJ Haydn. Critics also noted similarities to pioneering US new wave band Devo, in the themes of the lyrics and Haydn's production.

"Big Boy" includes a guest appearance from Jason Williamson, vocalist of English band Sleaford Mods.

== Critical reception ==
Professional ratings
Aggregate scores
Source	Rating
AnyDecentMusic?	8.1/10
Metacritic	82/100
Review scores
Source	Rating
AllMusic	4/5 stars
Clash	8/10
Exclaim!	8/10
Glide	4/5 stars
Kerrang!	4/5 stars
The Line of Best Fit	9/10
MusicOMH	4.5/5 stars
NME	4/5 stars
Pitchfork	6.2/10
The Skinny	4/5 stars

On review aggregator website, Metacritic, Cave World has an average critic score of 82 out of 100, indicating "universal acclaim" based on thirteen critics. On AnyDecentMusic?, Cave World has an average score of 8.1 out of 10 based on ten contemporary music critic scores.

Reviewing the album for AllMusic, Mark Deming compared it favourably to the band's previous releases; "musically, technically, and philosophically Cave World is a world away from the band that recorded "Research Chemicals" or "Sports," and they've added some brain power without losing their strength." Alan Ashton-Smith of musicOMH awarded Cave World four-and-a-half stars out of five, summarizing the album as the best album of their career. Ashton-Smith described Cave World as "clever but debauched, silly but serious, this is the best album of their career thus far". Ross Horton, writing for The Line of Best Fit gave Cave World a 9 out of 10. Horton compared the album to the works of Iggy Pop and said that the album "is by some measure their most adventurous. Where the first (2018's Street Worms) was a note-perfect, hermetically-sealed recreation of old thrills, and the second (2021's Welfare Jazz) was an expansive and expanded take on the same source material, this one draws from a new well".

Ian Winwood, writing for Kerrang! gave Cave World four out of five stars, saying "Cave World is an album brimming not just with colour and life, but also with a sense of striking unease that is pitched somewhere between the deeply sexual and the profoundly sinister." Winwood gave specific praise to the tracks "Ain't No Thief", "Return to Monke", and "Creepy Crawlers". Laveia Thomas, of Clash praised the instrumentation on Cave World, particularly the use of the saxophone throughout the album. Thomas said that Cave World "paints rock'n'roll through a rose-tinted glass – distorted, warped and just completely fascinating". Thomas would go further to say that the band "have built their acclaim on the prefix that they're doing things differently, having built an army of fans from their projects, Viagra Boys weave in hints of electronica, intense bursts of sax, and angsty spoken-word vocals across this soaring new album".

P.J. McCormick, writing for Pitchfork offered a more mixed review of the album, giving it a 6.2 out of 10. Comparing their work to fellow Swedish band, The Hives, McCormick praised the production of the album saying that the album "production is cleaner than Viagra Boys' first two albums, bringing their ever-present drive to the fore. The interplay of the rhythm section, vocal layering, and the occasional sax tear elides some of the weaker lyrics, and the album's bass-forward gloss recalls Danger Mouse's back catalog of rock-oriented production work (Parquet Courts' Wide Awake, The Black Keys' El Camino, Portugal. The Man's Woodstock). However, McCormick was critical of the album's critique of the alt-right, particularly saying "try as they might to curry offense by embodying the mindset of the alt-right internet troll, Cave World's weaker moments recall a late-night television monologue: toothless, expendable, and not particularly interested in convincing the uninitiated."

The album was mentioned in 'End of Year' lists for several publications, including Dazed and Glide.

== Track listing ==
All tracks are written by Oscar Carls, Pelle Gunnerfeldt, Linus Hillborg, Henrik Höckert, Elias Jungqvist, Sebastian Murphy and Tor Sjöden, except where noted.

Cave World track listing
No.	Title	Writer(s)	Length
1.	"Baby Criminal"		4:39
2.	"Cave Hole"	Fabian Berglund	0:39
3.	"Troglodyte"		3:19
4.	"Punk Rock Loser"		3:57
5.	"Creepy Crawlers"		3:09
6.	"The Cognitive Trade-Off Hypothesis"		3:55
7.	"Globe Earth"	Berglund	0:41
8.	"Ain't No Thief"		3:59
9.	"Big Boy" (featuring Jason Williamson)		5:30
10.	"ADD"		3:37
11.	"Human Error"	Berglund	0:29
12.	"Return to Monke"		6:28
Total length:			40:22

Deluxe edition bonus tracks
No.	Title	Writer(s)	Length
13.	"It Ain't Enough"		4:43
14.	"Stretch My Arms"		3:39
15.	"Milk Farm"		5:38
16.	"Only Friend" (Du Är Min Enda Vän)	Philemon Arthur; translation by Murphy	3:27
Total length:			57:49

== Personnel ==
Viagra Boys

- Sebastian Murphy − vocals (tracks 1, 3–6, 8–10, 12)
- Henrik Höckert − bass (tracks 1, 3–6, 8–10, 12), vocals (track 1)
- Tor Sjöden − drums and percussion (tracks 1, 3–6, 8, 9, 12), vocals (tracks 1, 9)
- Oscar Carls − saxophone and flute (tracks 1, 3, 5, 6, 8, 9, 12), guitar (tracks 3, 10), vocals (track 1)
- Elias Jungqvist − keyboard (tracks 1, 3–6, 8, 9), piano (track 9), vibraphone (track 6), vocals (tracks 1, 9)
- Linus Hillborg − guitar (tracks 1, 3–6, 8–10, 12), vocals (track 1)

Additional musicians

- Pelle Gunnerfeldt − guitar (tracks 4, 6, 9, 10), keyboard (tracks 4, 6, 8–10, 12), piano (tracks 4, 6, 8, 9), vocals (tracks 5, 6, 9)
- Fabian Berglund − keyboards (tracks 2, 7, 11), drums (track 5), turntable (track 12)
- Jason Williamson − vocals (track 9)

Production

- Pelle Gunnerfeldt − producer (tracks 1, 3–6, 8–10, 12–16), engineer, mixing
- DJ Haydn (Fabian Berglund) − producer (tracks 2, 7, 11), engineer
- Johan Gustafsson – engineer
- Oscar Ulfheden – engineer
- Robin Schmidt – mastering
- Moa Romanova – art direction
- Sebastian Murphy – art direction
- André Jofré – lead creative
- Victor Svedberg – final art

== Charts ==
Chart performance for Cave World
Chart (2022)	Peak position
Belgian Albums (Ultratop Flanders)	36
Belgian Albums (Ultratop Wallonia)	198
Dutch Albums (Album Top 100)	86
Finnish Albums (Suomen virallinen lista)	8
German Albums (Offizielle Top 100)	28
Scottish Albums (Official Charts)	7
Swedish Albums (Sverigetopplistan)	17
Swiss Albums (Schweizer Hitparade)	73
UK Albums (Official Charts)	57
UK Independent Albums (Official Charts)	2
