= Moa Romanova =

Swedish cartoonist (born 1992)

- Born: Moa Johanna Strinnholm; May 9, 1992 (age 34) Bollstabruk, Kramfors Municipality, Sweden
- Areas: Graphic novelist, cartoonist, artist, illustrator
- Notable works: Goblin Girl
- Awards: Eisner Award for Best U.S. Edition of International Material (2021)

Moa Romanova Strinnholm, formerly Moa Johanna Strinnholm, born April 9, 1992, in Bollstabruk, Kramfors Municipality, Sweden, is a Swedish cartoonist, artist and illustrator. She made her debut with the autobiographical graphic novel Goblin Girl (Alltid fucka upp), which has been published in several languages. In 2020, she received the Svenska Tecknares ("Swedish illustrators") Kolla! award in the Narrative category for her debut novel and in 2021 she was awarded the Eisner Award for the American edition of the book.

== Biography ==
Moa Romanova grew up in Bollstabruk outside Kramfors and played handball during her youth, but in her mid-teens her interest in drawing took over. She moved to Stockholm to attend Designgymnasiet (The Design High School) in Nacka, but after just one semester she switched to the aesthetic program at Härnösand High School. In the fall of 2011 she had her first exhibition, a solo show at Konsthallen in Härnösand.

=== Art school, oil paintings and blog ===
In the fall of 2012, she enrolled at Göteborgs konstskola (the Gothenburg School of Art) where she studied classical painting but dropped out after two semesters. She remained in Gothenburg where she painted in oils, freelanced as an illustrator and blogged about art, fashion and feminism under the name Monkinodraw. The pen name Moa Romanova was created the same year she moved to Gothenburg when she changed one of her first names to Romanova. She is not related to the Russian Tsarist Romanov family.

=== Comic Art School and Goblin Girl ===
In 2016, she was accepted at The Comic Art School in Malmö and made her debut two years later with the autobiographical graphic novel Goblin Girl (Alltid fucka upp). The book depicts a period of crisis in Romanova's life. It deals with panic attacks, friendships and artistic dreams, as well as her relationship with a famous media man who offers to be her patron. The graphic novel was published by Kartago förlag with Nina Hemmingsson as publisher.

It was well received and appreciated for "sharp precision, wonderful character drawings" and "well-developed, intricate imagery, shifting effortlessly from graphic pastel minimalism to bright 80s colors." The book has been published in several languages under different names, including Paniikkiprinsessa in Finland, Fucker hele tiden op in Denmark, Identikid in Germany, and as Goblin Girl by the American comics publisher Fantagraphics.

In 2020, she received the Svenska Tecknares ("Swedish illustrators") Kolla! award in the Narrative category for her debut novel. In 2021, she was also awarded the Eisner Award for Best U.S. Edition of International Material. She was also nominated for the 2020 John Leonard Prize for Literature, awarded by the National Book Critics Circle for the best debut novel published in the United States.

=== The Fanzine On tour ===
Romanova's friends artist Sarah Klang and musician Åsa Söderquist, from the band ShitKid, often appear as characters in her comics. She has also made music videos and album covers for them. In 2020, she released the fanzine On tour, about when she joined ShitKid's tour through Europe. Along with the fanzine, a collection of prints and merch was also launched in collaboration with the fashion store Aplace.

=== The graphic novel Buff Soul ===
In the spring of 2022, she released her second graphic novel Buff Soul (På glid), which deals with friendship, addiction, and a desire for security. Like On tour, the novel takes place during a tour with the punk duo ShitKid, this time in the United States. Life on tour quickly becomes destructive with alcohol, sex and drugs.

The novel was well received, especially in terms of aesthetics. "It is alternately mangalike, eighties-scented and psychedelic, both grotesque and very aesthetically pleasing." wrote, for example, the reviewer in Dagens Nyheter.

Romanova had originally intended to follow up her debut novel with an adventure novel set along the High Coast. She described it as "Nancy Drew on Ketamine."

Romanova lives in Stockholm with her boyfriend Sebastian Murphy, lead singer of the band Viagra Boys.

== Works ==
- 2018 – Alltid fucka upp. Kartago. LIBRIS link ISBN 9789175153032
- 2020 – On tour. Peow. LIBRIS link ISBN 9789187325496
- 2020 – Goblin Girl. Fantagraphics. LIBRIS link ISBN 9781683962830
- 2022 – På glid. Kaunitz-Olsson. LIBRIS link ISBN 9789189015692
- 2025 – Buff Soul. Fantagraphics. LIBRIS link ISBN 9798875000683
