= Halland Museum of Cultural History =

Museum in Varberg, Sweden

Coordinates: 57°6′20.15″N 12°14′22.12″E

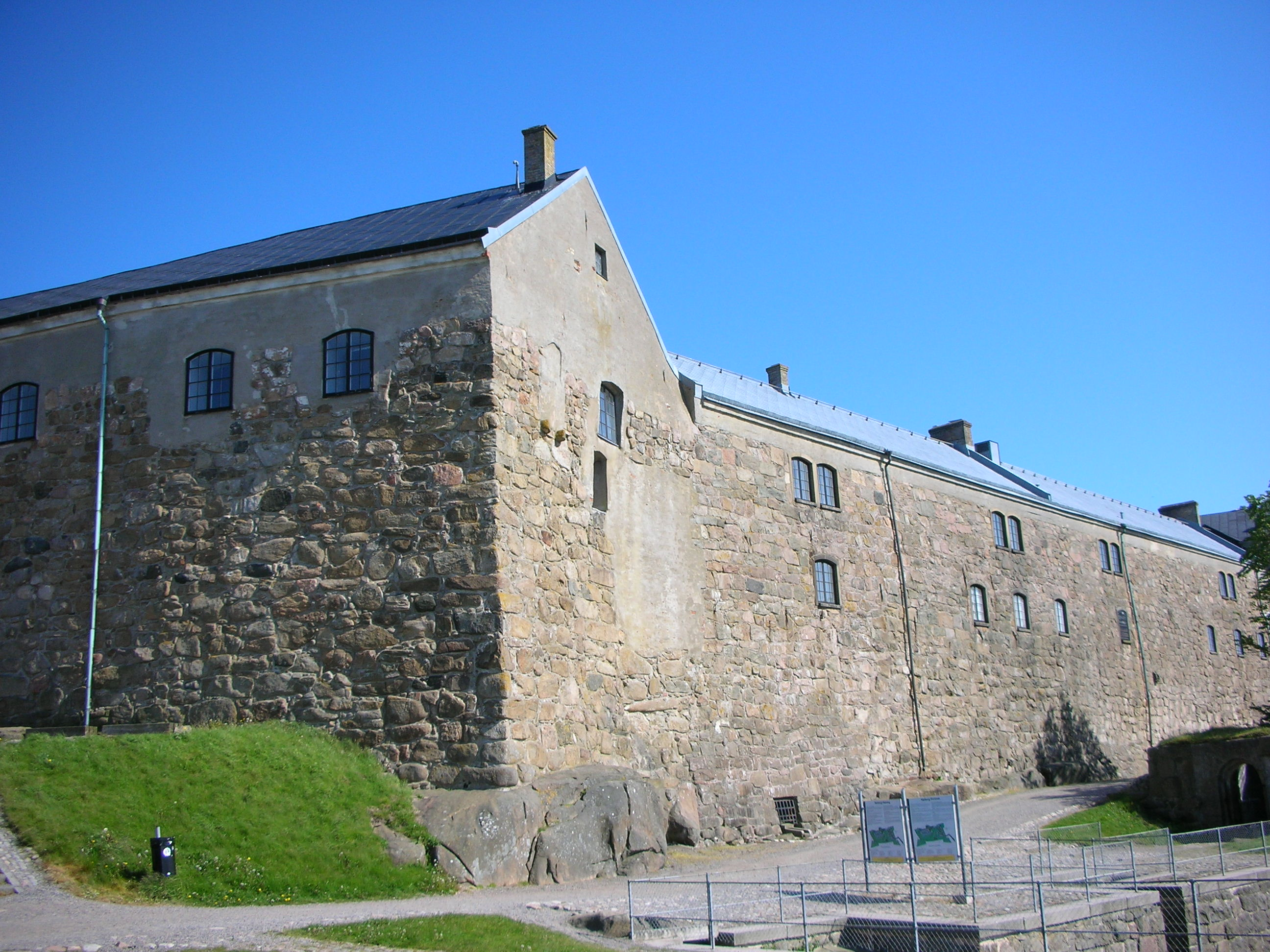
Halland Museum of Cultural History at Varberg Fortress

Halland Museum of Cultural History (Swedish: Hallands kulturhistoriska museum) is a museum of cultural history in Varberg, Sweden. The museum was formerly known as Varberg County Museum (Swedish: Länsmuseet Varberg). The name was changed in 2011.

The museum is situated in the Varberg Fortress. It also consists of Bexell Cottage (Bexellska stugan), Galtabäck boat museum (Båtmuseet i Galtabäcks hamn) and Fågelboet, the former home of the author August Bondeson (1854-1906).

The most important and famous exhibit at the museum is Bocksten Man, the remains of a man murdered during the fourteenth century.
