= Welfare Jazz =

Studio album by Viagra Boys
- Released: 8 January 2021
- Recorded: 2019–2020
- Studio: Studio Årstaberg (Stockholm); Robotberget (Stockholm); Electric Lady Studios (New York); Studio Gröndahl (Stockholm); Magix Playground (Stockholm)
- Genre: Art punk; experimental rock; post-punk
- Length: 40:14
- Label: YEAR0001
- Producer: Daniel Fagerström; Pelle Gunnerfeldt; DJ Haydn; Raisen Brothers; Matt Sweeney; Patrik Berger

Viagra Boys chronology
Common Sense (2020)	Welfare Jazz (2021)	Cave World (2022)

Singles from Welfare Jazz
- 1. "Ain't Nice" Released: 14 October 2020; 2. "Creatures" Released: 2 December 2020; 3. "In Spite of Ourselves" Released: 16 December 2020; 4. "Girls & Boys" Released: 6 January 2021

Welfare Jazz is the second studio album by Swedish post-punk band Viagra Boys. It was released on 8 January 2021, through YEAR0001.

== Background ==
The album was produced by Pelle Gunnerfeldt, Daniel Fagerström, Justin Raisen, Fabian Berglund aka DJ Haydn, and Patrik Berger.

In a press release, lead vocalist Sebastian Murphy said of the album: "We wrote these songs at a time when I had been in a long-term relationship, taking drugs every day, and being an asshole. I didn't really realise what an asshole I was until it was too late, and a lot of the record has to do with coming to terms with the fact that I'd set the wrong goals for myself."

== Composition ==
In comparison to their debut, Welfare Jazz is less claustrophobic and oppressive, however, the song "Girls & Boys" manages to pushe these qualities to the extreme. The back-and-forth vocal duet on "In Spite Of Ourselves" draws a comparison to The White Stripes' song "It's True That We Love One Another".

Lyrically, "This Old Dog", "Secret Canine Agent", and "Girls and Boys" bridges an analogy between likable canine behaviour and less desirable human qualities.

== Release ==
On 15 October 2020, Viagra Boys announced the release of their second studio album.

=== Singles ===
The first single "Ain't Nice" was released on 14 October 2020. On 2 December 2020, Viagra Boys released the second single, "Creatures".

The third single "In Spite of Ourselves" was released on 16 December 2020. The single is a cover of American country folk musician John Prine's song of the same name, and features Australian musician Amy Taylor of Amyl and the Sniffers. The fourth single "Girls & Boys" was released on 6 January 2021.

== Critical reception ==
Professional ratings
Aggregate scores
Source	Rating
AnyDecentMusic?	7.8/10
Metacritic	78/100
Review scores
Source	Rating
Beats Per Minute	77/100
Clash	8/10
Consequence of Sound	B
DIY	3.5/5 stars
Exclaim!	8/10
The Line of Best Fit	8/10
MusicOMH	5/5 stars
NME	4/5 stars
Pitchfork	7.2/10
Under the Radar	8/10

Welfare Jazz was met with "generally favorable" reviews from critics. At Metacritic, which assigns a weighted average rating out of 100 to reviews from mainstream publications, this release received an average score of 78 based on 16 reviews. At AnyDecentMusic?, the album received a 7.8 out of 10 based on 22 reviews.

The song "Creatures" was singled out as the high point of Welfare Jazz. It's one of the cleanest and more melodic songs, the "finest example" where the band explore their style, "find something that sticks, [and] exploit the hell out of it".

Writing for Clash, Josh Gray said: "Much like their 2018 debut Street Worms, Welfare Jazz concerns itself with the internal lives of the scuzziest dregs of humanity: no-good drifters who lug their vintage calculator collections from couch to couch, self-deceiving junkies who regale hallucinatory conversations they have with their dogs with the listener, alcoholics who scream and ramble on about their problems and other assorted bottom feeders." In a review for Exclaim!, Sarah Morrison gave the album an 8 out of 10, saying "the album occasionally takes the foot off the gas, to great effect. As Viagra Boys have done on previous releases, Welfare Jazz also features a handful of interludes, a breath of fresh air from the smoky, heavy din of its basement mosh pits." She also went on to say the album is "a massive shift from previous releases, both musically and lyrically.

== Track listing ==
Welfare Jazz track listing
No.	Title	Writer(s)	Length
1.	"Ain't Nice"	Sebastian Murphy, Oskar Carls, Henrik Höckert, Tor Sjödén	3:32
2.	"Cold Play"	Carls	0:31
3.	"Toad"	Murphy, Carls, Höckert, Sjödén, Daniel Fagerström	3:35
4.	"This Old Dog"	Murphy, Sjödén, Fagerström	0:37
5.	"Into the Sun"	Murphy, Carls, Pelle Gunnerfeldt	3:58
6.	"Creatures"	Murphy, Carls, Höckert, Benjamin Vallé, Fagerström	3:32
7.	"6 Shooter"	Carls, Höckert, Sjödén, Vallé, Elias Jungqvist, Fagerström, Gunnerfeldt	4:50
8.	"Best in Show II"	Murphy, Carls, Fagerström	0:46
9.	"Secret Canine Agent"	Murphy, Carls, Höckert, Sjödén, Jungqvist, Fagerström	1:45
10.	"I Feel Alive"	Murphy, Carls, Höckert, Sjödén, Vallé, Jungqvist	4:29
11.	"Girls and Boys"	Murphy, Carls, Höckert, Sjödén, Vallé, Martin Vogel	4:39
12.	"To the Country"	Murphy, Carls, Höckert, Sjödén, Vallé, Jungqvist, Fagerström, Gunnerfeldt	2:57
13.	"In Spite of Ourselves" (featuring Amy Taylor)	John Prine	5:03
Total length:			40:14

Deluxe edition bonus tracks
No.	Title	Length
14.	"Girls & Boys" (Patrik Berger Remix)	5:29
15.	"Dream Interlude"	1:15
16.	"You and Me Baby"	2:32
17.	"Blue Bone"	2:06
18.	"16 Wheeler Horse"	4:22
19.	"Ain't Nice" (Rotterdam Mix)	4:12
20.	"Creatures" (Someone's Great Version)	3:45
Total length:		63:55

== Personnel ==
Viagra Boys

- Sebastian Murphy – vocals (tracks 1, 3–6, 8–13)
- Henrik Höckert − bass (tracks 1, 3, 6, 7, 9–13)
- Tor Sjödén − drums (tracks 1, 3, 5–7, 9–13), percussion (track 4), trumpet (track 5)
- Oskar Carls − saxophone (tracks 1–3, 6–13), flute (tracks 5, 10, 12), synthesizer (tracks 1, 3, 5), guitar (tracks 1, 3), drum programming (track 1), bass (track 5), clarinet (track 12)
- Elias Jungqvist – synthesizer (tracks 1, 9, 13), piano (tracks 6, 7, 10, 12), guitar (track 9), drum programming (track 9), organ (track 10)
- Benjamin Vallé – guitar (tracks 5–7, 10–12)

Additional musicians

- Daniel Fagerström – guitar (tracks 3, 7, 9, 13), drum programming (track 3, 6), sampler (tracks 3, 9, 10), backing vocals (tracks 3, 5, 10), synthesizer (tracks 6–9, 11, 12), Mellotron (track 10), piano (track 12)
- Pelle Gunnerfeldt – guitar (tracks 5, 13), drum programming (tracks 5, 13), sampler (tracks 5–7), synthesizer (track 6), bass (tracks 6, 13), piano (track 10)
- Amy Taylor – vocals (track 13)
- Fabian Berglund (DJ Haydn) − guitar (track 1)
- Matt Sweeney – guitar (track 11)
- Patrik Berger – synthesizer (track 11)
- Martin Vogel – synthesizer (track 11), congas (track 11)
- Stella Cartriers – backing vocals (tracks 3, 10, 12)
- Samuel T. Herring – backing vocals (tracks 10, 12)
- Edvin Fagerström − percussion (track 10)
- Oscar Ulfheden – door (track 12)

Production

- Daniel Fagerström − producer (all tracks), engineer
- Pelle Gunnerfeldt − producer (all tracks), engineer, mixing
- DJ Haydn (Fabian Berglund) − producer (track 1)
- Matt Sweeney – producer (track 11)
- Patrik Berger – producer (track 11)
- Justin Raisen – producer (track 11)
- Jeremiah Raisen – producer (track 11)
- Christoffer Zakrisson – engineer
- David Castillo – engineer
- Isak Sjöholm – engineer
- Oscar Ulfheden – engineer
- Robin Schmidt – mastering
- Sebastian Murphy – original artwork
- Victor Svedberg – final artwork

== Charts ==
Chart performance for Welfare Jazz
Chart (2021)	Peak position
Belgian Albums (Ultratop Flanders)	90
German Albums (Offizielle Top 100)	28
French Albums (SNEP)	179
Scottish Albums (OCC)	5
Swedish Albums (Sverigetopplistan)	11
UK Albums (OCC)	41
UK Independent Albums (OCC)	2
