= Varberg Fortress =

Medieval fortification in Sweden

Coordinates: 57°6.4′N 12°14.4′E

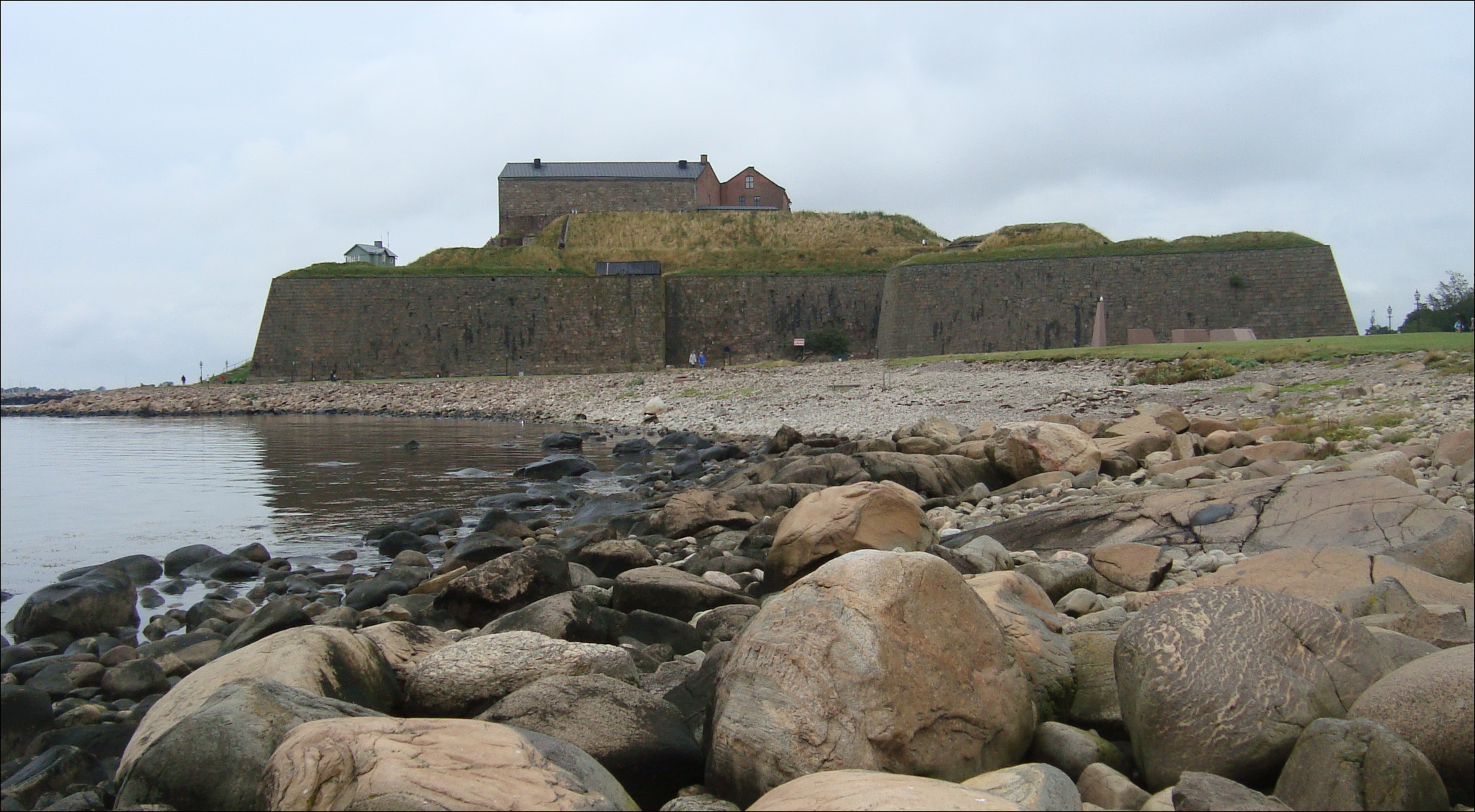
Varberg Fortress as seen from the south.

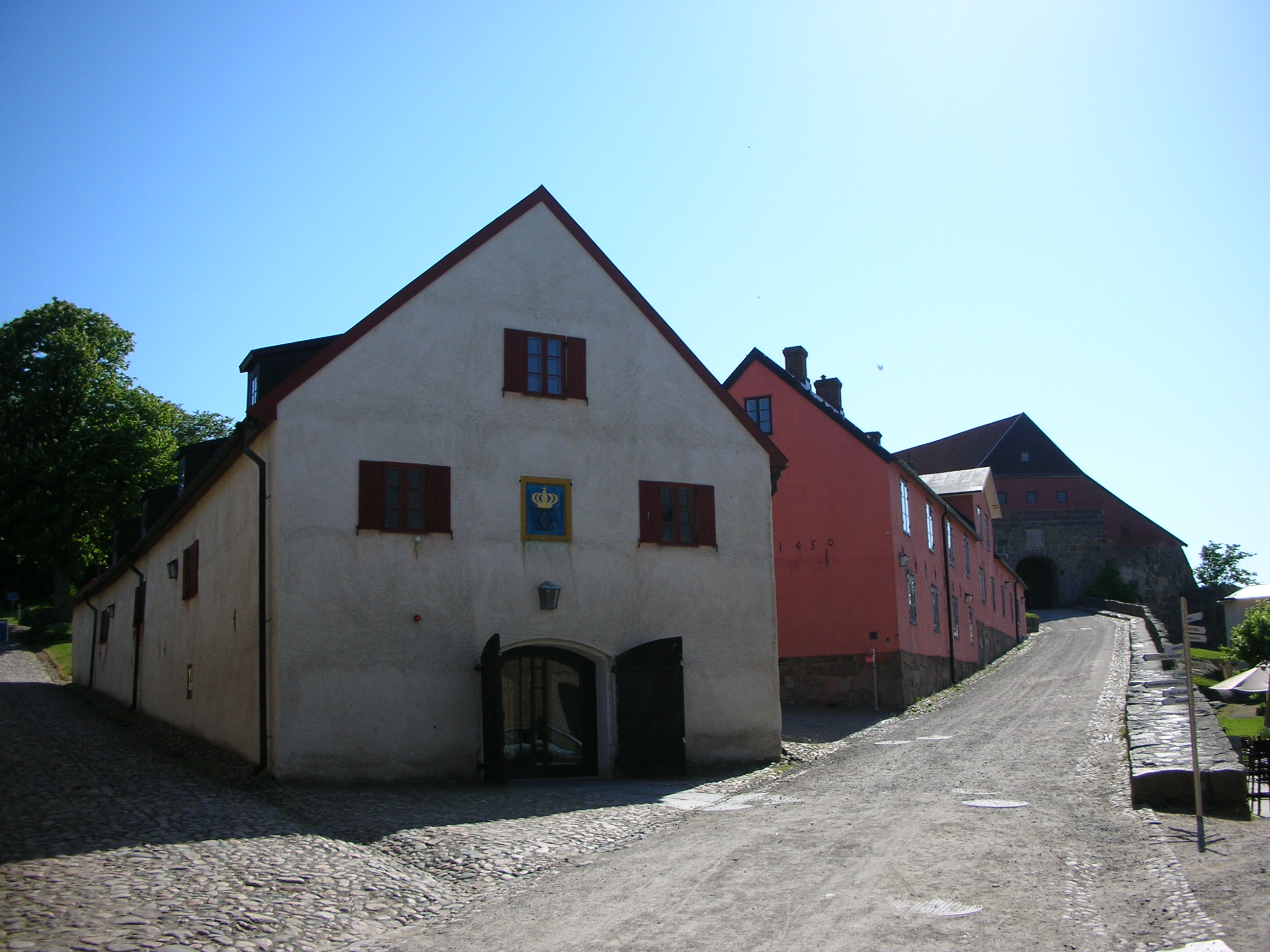
Charles XI's Stable, situated inside the fortress.

Varberg Fortress (Swedish: Varbergs fästning) is a former fortification in Varberg, Halland County, Sweden, which currently serves as a museum.

== History ==
Varberg Fortress was built in 1287-1300 by Count Jacob Nielsen as protection against Eric VI of Denmark, who had declared him an outlaw after the murder of his father King Eric V of Denmark. Jacob had close connections with King Eric II of Norway and as a result got substantial Norwegian assistance with the construction. The fortress, as well as half the county, became Norwegian in 1305. In the fourteenth century the fortress was expanded to include a castle.

King Erik's grand daughter, Ingeborg Håkansdotter, inherited the area from her father, King Haakon V of Norway. She and her husband, Duke Erik Magnusson, established a semi-independent state out of their Norwegian, Swedish and Danish counties until the death of Erik. They spent considerable time at the fortress. Their son Magnus Eriksson, King of Sweden and Norway, spent much time at the fortress as well.

Varberg was besieged multiple times in the 16th century. Much of the original structure was destroyed as a result. The fortress was augmented during the late 16th and early 17th century on order by King Christian IV of Denmark. However, after the Treaty of Brömsebro in 1645 the fortress became Swedish. It was used as a military installation until 1830 and as a prison from the end of the 17th Century until 1931.

It is currently used as a museum and has a couple of notable pieces on permanent exhibit: Bocksten Man with the only complete clothing from the 1300s known to have been worn by a single individual, and the bullet that supposedly killed Charles XII of Sweden. The fort also houses a bed and breakfast as well as private accommodation. The moat of the fortress is said to be inhabited by a small lake monster. In August 2006, a couple of witnesses claimed to have seen the monster emerge from the dark water and devour a duck. The creature is described as brown, furless and with a 40 cm long tail.
