= Viagr Aboys =

Studio album by Viagra Boys
- Released: 25 April 2025
- Genres: Dance-punk revival; post-punk; art punk
- Length: 37:21
- Label: Shrimptech Enterprises
- Producers: Viagra Boys; Pelle Gunnerfeldt

Viagra Boys chronology
Cave World (2022)	Viagr Aboys (2025)

Singles from Viagr Aboys
- 1. "Man Made of Meat" Released: 23 January 2025; 2. "Uno II" Released: 27 February 2025; 3. "The Bog Body" Released: 24 March 2025

Viagr Aboys (stylized in lowercase) is the fourth studio album by Swedish post-punk band Viagra Boys. It was released on 25 April 2025 through Shrimptech Enterprises.

== Background and theme ==
Viagr Aboys was produced by long-time collaborator Pelle Gunnerfeldt and serves as the debut release through their own newly launched Shrimptech Enterprises after their departure from Year0001 in 2024. In August 2024, lead singer Sebastian Murphy first revealed to NME that the band has a new album on the way, having "taken different approaches to songwriting" this time. The goal was to incorporate "a little bit of everything" and "see where it ends up" with hopes that people do not "expect what's coming."

The band later described the record as "juxtaposing real life with high art." It is set to "follow on" from their previous "politically-charged" album but also be a "little different." Murphy admitted that "the whole political thing was exhausting" and created a record that is "a bit simple and stupid" because this reflects his personality.

== Promotion ==
Viagra Boys announced their self-titled album on 23 January 2025 alongside the release of the lead single "Man Made of Meat". The latter was first performed live in June 2023 and arrived with a "cinematic, existential" music video. The second single "Uno II" was released on 27 February and was titled after Murphy's Italian Greyhound who has to undergo frequent vet visits.

== Critical reception ==
Professional ratings
Aggregate scores
Source	Rating
AnyDecentMusic?	8.3/10
Metacritic	83/100
Review scores
Source	Rating
AllMusic	4/5 stars
Clash	9/10
DIY	4/5 stars
Dork	5/5 stars
The Line of Best Fit	9/10
Mojo	8/10
MusicOMH	4/5 stars
NME	4/5 stars
Paste	8.5/10
PopMatters	8/10
The Skinny	4/5 stars

At Metacritic, which assigns a weighted average rating out of 100 to reviews from mainstream critics, Viagr Aboys received a rating of 83 out of 100 based on thirteen critic reviews, indicating "universal acclaim".

== Track listing ==
All lyrics are written by Sebastian Murphy and Pelle Gunnerfeldt; all music is composed by Murphy, Elias Jungqvist, Henrik Höckert, Oskar Carls, Linus Hillborg, Tor Sjödén, and Gunnerfeldt.

Viagr Aboys track listing
No.	Title	Length
1.	"Man Made of Meat"	3:09
2.	"The Bog Body"	2:53
3.	"Uno II"	2:15
4.	"Pyramid of Health"	3:15
5.	"Dirty Boyz"	3:44
6.	"Medicine for Horses"	2:55
7.	"Waterboy"	2:58
8.	"Store Policy"	3:35
9.	"You N33d Me"	3:53
10.	"Best in Show Pt. IV"	5:28
11.	"River King"	3:16
Total length:		37:21

Rough Trade bonus CD exclusive tracks
No.	Title	Length
1.	"Therapy"	2:30
2.	"Lilja 4 Waterboy"	3:34
3.	"Store Policy (demo)"	2:14

Japanese Deluxe Edition
No.	Title	Length
1.	"Therapy II"	2:40
2.	"Middleage(d) Humanoid"	2:39
3.	"Watching You"	3:53
4.	"Cumboy"	3:51

== Personnel ==
=== Viagra Boys ===
- Oskar Carls – production (all tracks), guitar (tracks 1, 2, 4, 5, 7, 9), saxophone (2–4, 6, 8–10), flute (3, 8), background vocals (5, 7), bass clarinet (11)
- Linus Hillborg – production (all tracks), guitar (tracks 1–10)
- Henrik Höckert – production (all tracks), bass (tracks 1–10)
- Elias Jungqvist – production (all tracks), synthesizer (tracks 1–10), piano (6, 10), background vocals (7), sampler (11)
- Sebastian Murphy – vocals, production
- Tor Sjödén – production (all tracks), drums (tracks 1–10), percussion (2, 3, 5, 10), background vocals (7)

=== Additional contributors ===
- Pelle Gunnerfeldt – production (all tracks), mixing (all tracks), percussion (tracks 4, 7–10), electric guitar (4, 8); acoustic guitar, piano (4); synthesizer (8–10)
- Robin Schmidt – mastering
- Anders af Klintberg – mixing (tracks 2, 4 of Japanese Deluxe Edition)
- Klara Keller – background vocals (tracks 3, 6)
- Anneli Törnkvist – background vocals (track 10)
- Ellinor Lindahl – background vocals (track 10)
- Lovisa Birgersson – background vocals (track 10)
- Lalo Cissohko – percussion (track 10)

== Charts ==
Chart performance for Viagr Aboys
Chart (2025)	Peak position
Australian Albums (ARIA)	99
Austrian Albums (Ö3 Austria)	75
Belgian Albums (Ultratop Flanders)	25
Belgian Albums (Ultratop Wallonia)	87
Dutch Albums (Album Top 100)	63
French Albums (SNEP)	170
French Rock & Metal Albums (SNEP)	12
German Albums (Offizielle Top 100)	15
Scottish Albums (Official Charts)	9
Swedish Albums (Sverigetopplistan)	7
Swiss Albums (Schweizer Hitparade)	25
UK Albums (Official Charts)	44
UK Independent Albums (Official Charts)	5
US Billboard 200	179
