= Bexell Cottage =

Building in Varberg, Sweden

Coordinates: 57°6′17.03″N 12°15′23.46″E

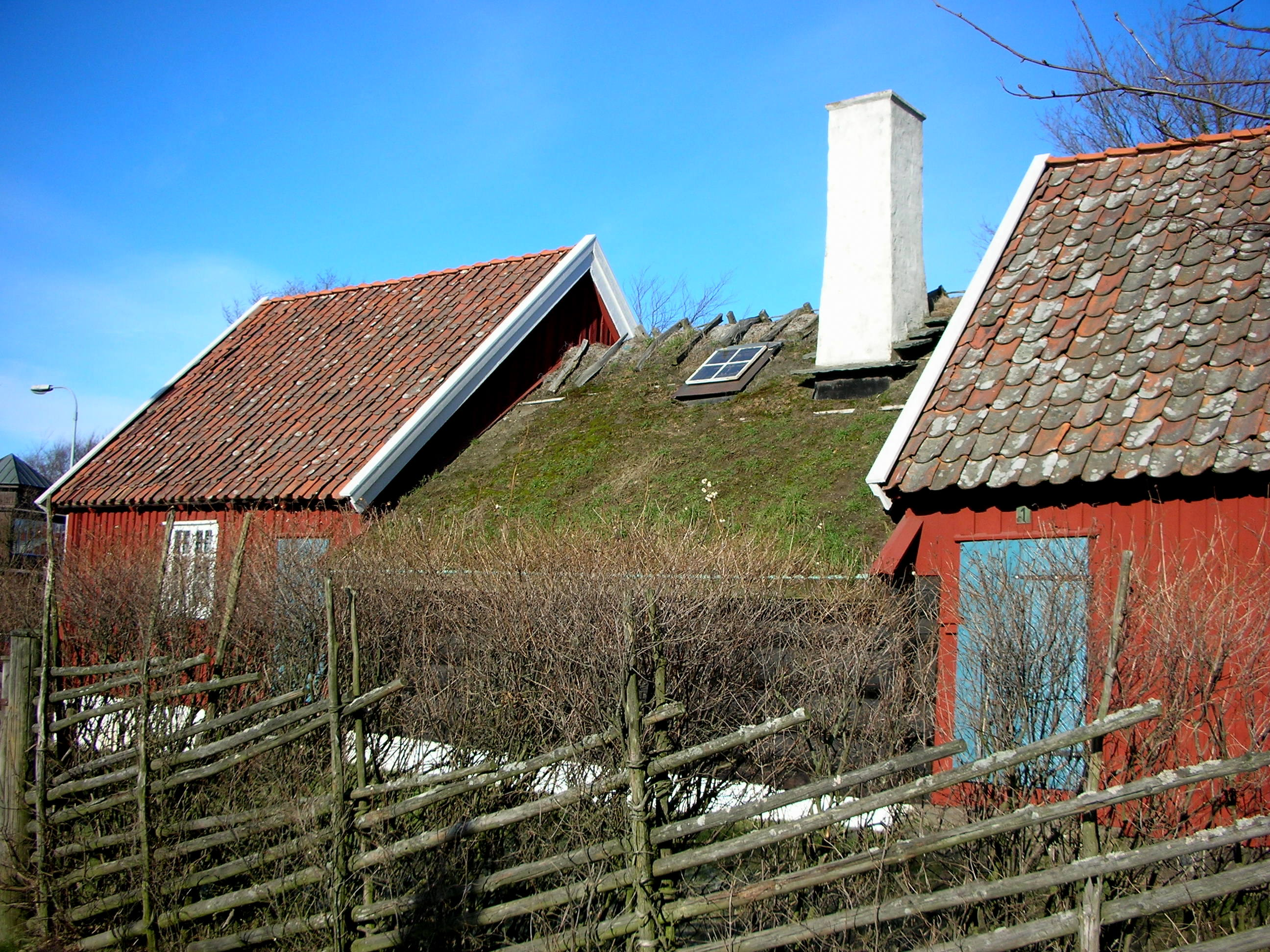
Bexell Cottage

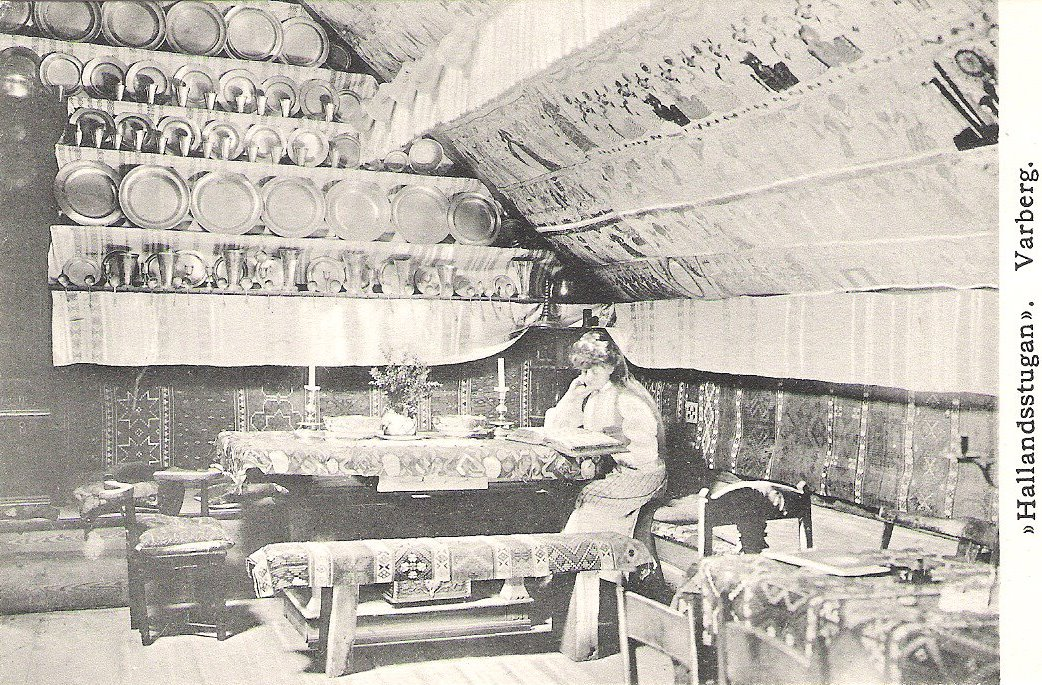
Interior of Bexell Cottage, early 20th century. Pictured is Herdis Bexell, a relative of Alfred Bexell

The Bexell Cottage (Swedish: Bexellska stugan) is a small cottage in Varberg, Sweden. It has been turned into a historical heritage mini-museum. In Bexell Cottage there are furnitures and painted wall tapestry from the 19th century. The tapestry cover the walls and ceiling of the cottage. Originally, they were only used for Christmas, but today they are posted all the year around. Bexell Cottage can be visited by the public at the shows of the cottage that are arranged by Halland Museum of Cultural History.

== History ==
The Bexell Cottage was originally built in 1785 at Harplinge. In 1876, it was bought by member of parliament and local land owner Alfred Bexell (1831–1900) from its owner Jöns Jönsson (born 1828) together with all interior possessions. Jönsson was only allowed to retain his day dress, according to the purchase agreement. Even Jönsson's snuffbox passed to the ownership of Bexell. Alfred Bexell was the first in Sweden who bought and protected a Swedish peasant's home with the intent of turning it into a museum. He inspired Arthur Hazelius to establish the open-air museum Skansen in Stockholm.

After Alfred Bexell's death, his widow Cecilia Bexell (1843–1929) moved the cottage to Varberg in 1907. The museum continued until 1915 after which Cecilia Bexell sold most of the items in the Bexellian collections at auction. Many of the auction items were bought by a local association formed with the intention of operating a museum. In the 20th century, it was called bålastugan, a Hallandic name of the type of cottage. In 2003, it became a part of Halland Museum of Cultural History. At present it is named Bexell Cottage.

== Bexell's Stones ==
Alfred Bexell also created a different kind of "museum" in a forested area which he owned, east of Varberg (northeast of the smaller village of Rolfstorp.) The area has become famous, after visitors in 1925 began discovering rocks engraved with sayings, names of noted people of the time, or mottos. They were all commissioned by Bexell during the end of the nineteenth century, and were carved by two stonemasons whom he hired for the purpose. His diaries describe his causing the engravings but do not explain his motive.

In 2014 an effort was mounted to discover the extent of the engravings; as of 2016 some 600 names of famous writers, philosophers, scientists, politicians and statesmen have been identified in the carvings, as well as more than 180 aphorisms, sayings, quotes from literature, and Bexell's thoughts. The messages include: "Do not say all you know but always know what you say"; and "What is sleep but the image of death."

Bexell's own tombstone is inscribed with: "Man’s history is his character."

== Other sources ==
- Margareta Strömbom (2007) Bålastugan: Bexellska ryggåsstugan, föregångare till friluftsmuseet Skansen i Stockholm; ett unikt svenskt kulturarv (Varberg: CAL-Förlagets) ISBN 9789197399050
