= Sports (song) =

Single by Viagra Boys

from the album Street Worms
- Released: 5 July 2018
- Genre: Post-punk
- Length: 3:57
- Label: Year0001
- Songwriters: Benjamin Vallé; Tor Sjödén; Sebastian Murphy; Henrik Höckert; Oskar Carls; Martin Ehrencrona; Daniel Fagerström
- Producer: Daniel Fagerström

Viagra Boys singles chronology
"Sports" (2018)	"Just Like You" (2018)

Music video
- "Sports" on YouTube

"Sports" is the debut single by Swedish rock band Viagra Boys, released on 5 July 2018 as the first single from their debut studio album Street Worms (2018).

== Composition ==
The song's verses consist of Murphy listing sports-related words ("baseball, basketball, ping pong, short shorts") in a monotone voice and comparing activities that take little effort ("getting high in the morning, buying things off the Internet") to sports, while the chorus consists solely of him shouting and speaking the word "sports" in various ways; during the outro, the song slows down, then begins to speed up again as his voice becomes more erratic and often breaks before becoming breathless and devolving into guttural yells and drawls. Murphy described the song as a satire of masculinity.

== Music video ==
The music video shows the band members performing the song on an indoor tennis court in a sports centre, with tennis players attempting to play around and over them; unlike most music videos, it does not have the studio recording of the song dubbed over it, and instead features the version the band performed during filming.

== Critical reception ==
Sasha Geffen of Pitchfork wrote, "Murphy screams 'SPORTS!' at the climax in unhinged exasperation, stuttering and spitting out the word like he needed to defend his manhood at all costs. The song is a perfect indictment of the sort of sweaty, brittle masculinity that tends toward overcompensation." Pitchfork also named the song its "Best New Track". DIY described the song as "vocals twist[ing] their way through the track like Mark E. Smith, while a simple, brilliantly solid bassline holds it all together".

== Track listing ==
Sports – Single
No.	Title	Length
1.	"Sports"	3:57
2.	"Jungle Man"	3:11
3.	"Beijing Taxi"	4:06
