= Sebastian Murphy (singer) =

American singer (born 1990)

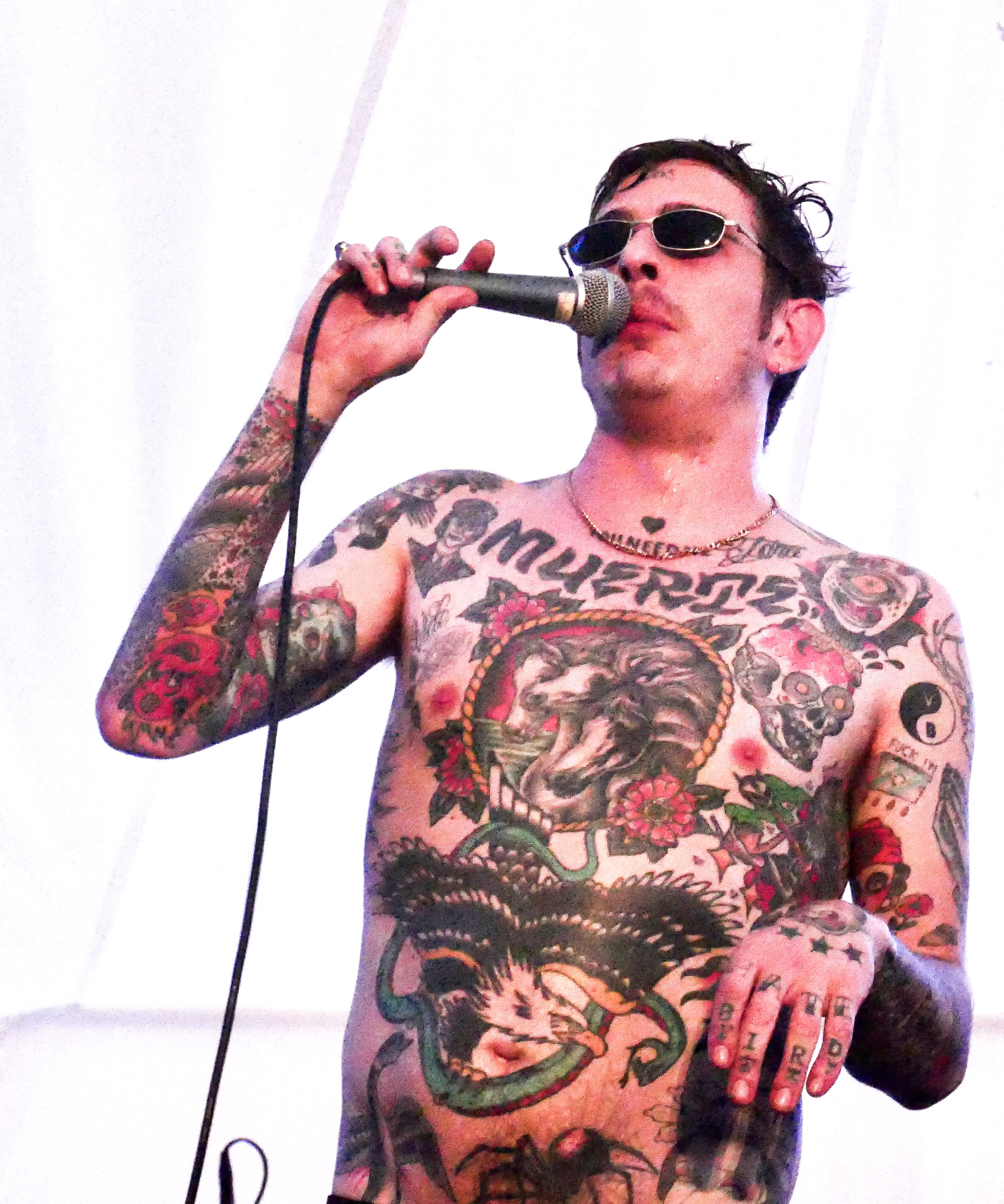
- Sebastian Murphy in Suffolk, England (July 19, 2019)

Background information
- Born: March 6, 1990 (age 36); San Rafael, California, US
- Origin: Stockholm, Sweden
- Genre: Post-punk
- Occupations: Musician; singer; songwriter; record producer
- Years active: 2015-present
- Label: Shrimptech Enterprises
- Member of: Viagra Boys
- Partner: Moa Romanova

Sebastian Declan Murphy (born March 6, 1990) is a Swedish-American singer, former tattoo artist and front man and only foreign-born member of the Stockholm-based post-punk band Viagra Boys since 2015 and the jazz band Grismask since 2021.

== Pre-band life ==
Sebastian Murphy was born in San Rafael, California to an American father, who worked as a banker, and a Swedish mother. Murphy became a drug addict which led to him being arrested when he was 15. In 2007, when he was 17 years old, he dropped out of high school and traveled to Stockholm where he lived with his aunt for several years. He became employed as a tattoo artist and became a member of the band, Viagra Boys, after they saw Murphy drunkenly perform Mariah Carey's song "We Belong Together" at a karaoke night.

== Music career ==
In 2018, the band released their debut album, Street Worms, on the Swedish independent label Year0001. Nils Hansson of Dagens Nyheter described the band favorably, praising their musical style as well as their use of black humor and satire, and rated the album 5/5. In 2019, the band won the Independent Music Companies Association (IMPALA) Album of the Year Award for Street Worms.

The band's second album, Welfare Jazz, was released in January 2021. In October of that same year, founding member and guitarist Benjamin Vallé died at the age of 47. While he appeared on Welfare Jazz, he was not an active member of the band at the time of his death. A deluxe edition of Welfare Jazz released in 2022, featuring new album art and seven new tracks.

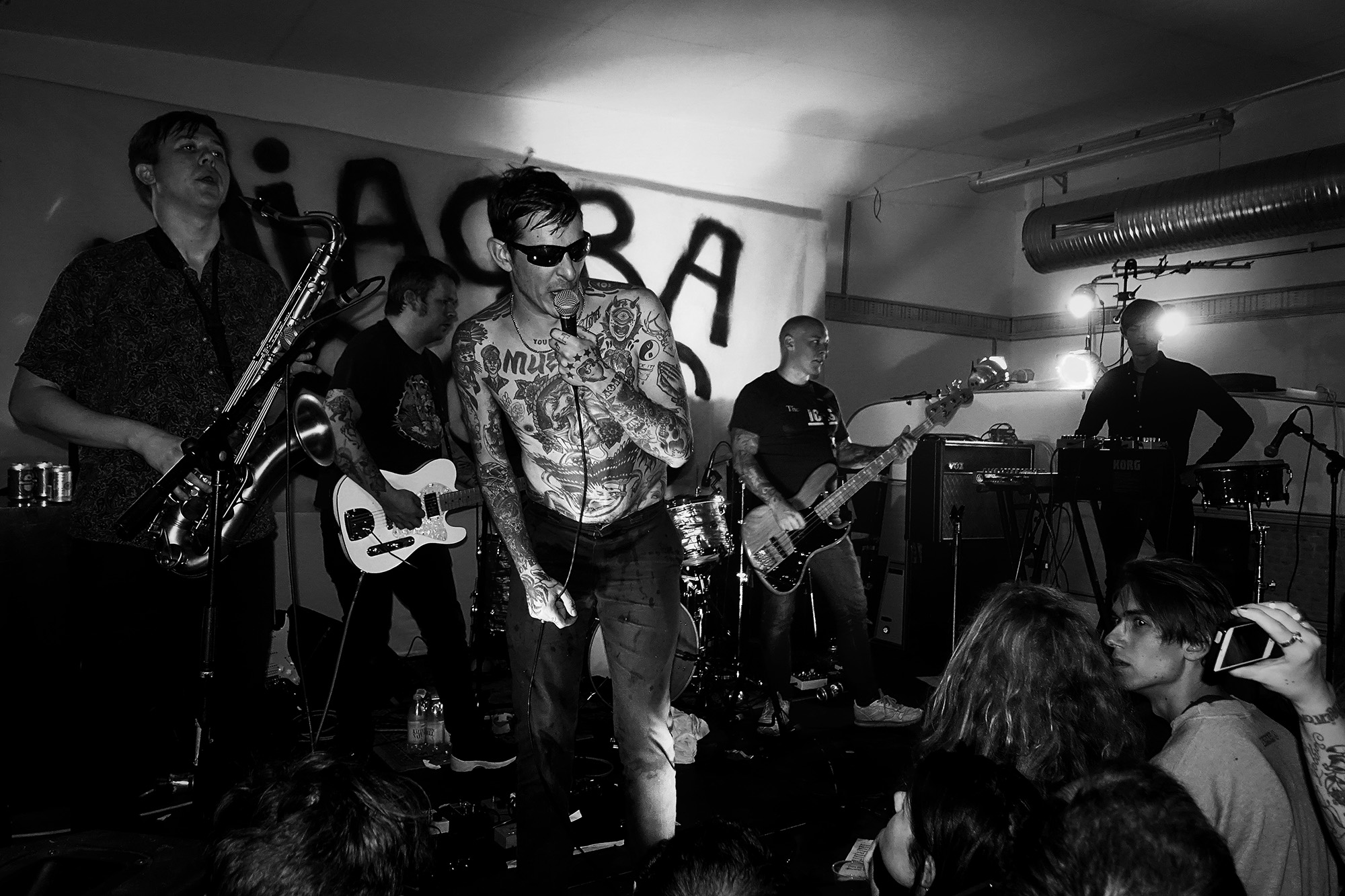
Sebastian Murphy in Malmö, Sweden

Viagra Boys' third studio album, Cave World, was released in July 2022. The band played at multiple festivals in 2022, including Coachella and Primavera Sound, and performed at Glastonbury in 2023. While touring in support of Cave World, they recorded a concert film during their February 23, 2023 show at The Salt Shed, which was later streamed and released for free on YouTube. Viagra Boys won the Swedish Grammis award for Rock of the Year in 2023, and supported Queens of the Stone Age during their North American tour that same year.

In January 2025, Viagra Boys announced Viagr Aboys, which was released on 25 April via their newly launched label Shrimptech Enterprises. That year they also embarked on "the infinite anxiety tour" in support of the album, playing shows across Europe, North America, Oceania, and Japan. The tour is set to include the band's biggest shows to-date, including performances at Alexandra Palace in London and Avicii Arena in Stockholm.

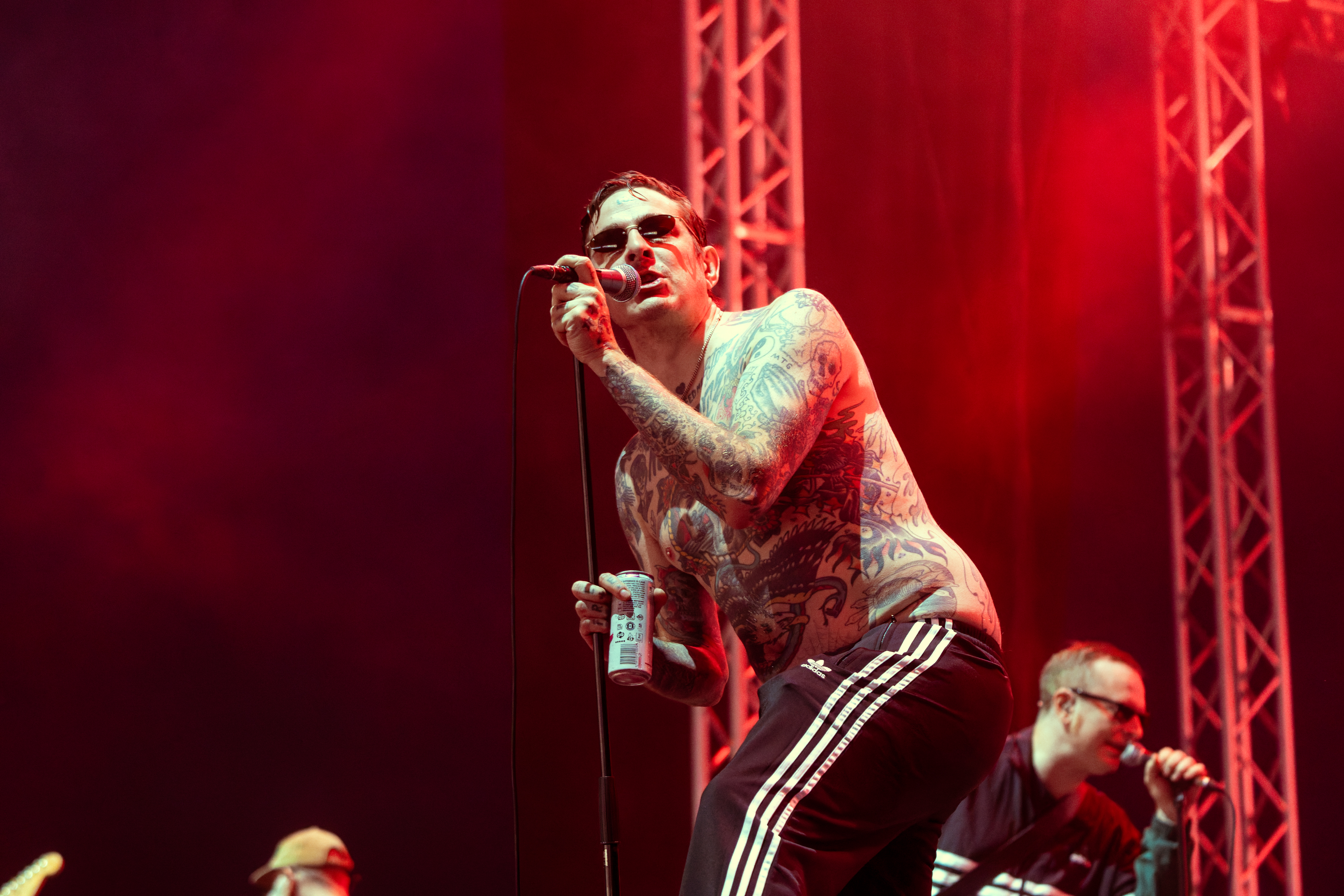
Sebastian Murphy in England (2025)

== Personal life ==
Sebastian speaks both English and Swedish fluently. He currently lives with and is in a romantic relationship with Moa Romanova, a Swedish cartoonist from Kramfors. Murphy has several tattoos across his body including the word "Lös" (the Swedish word for "Loose") across his forehead.
