= Liripipe =

Tail of a hood or cloak, or a long-tailed hood

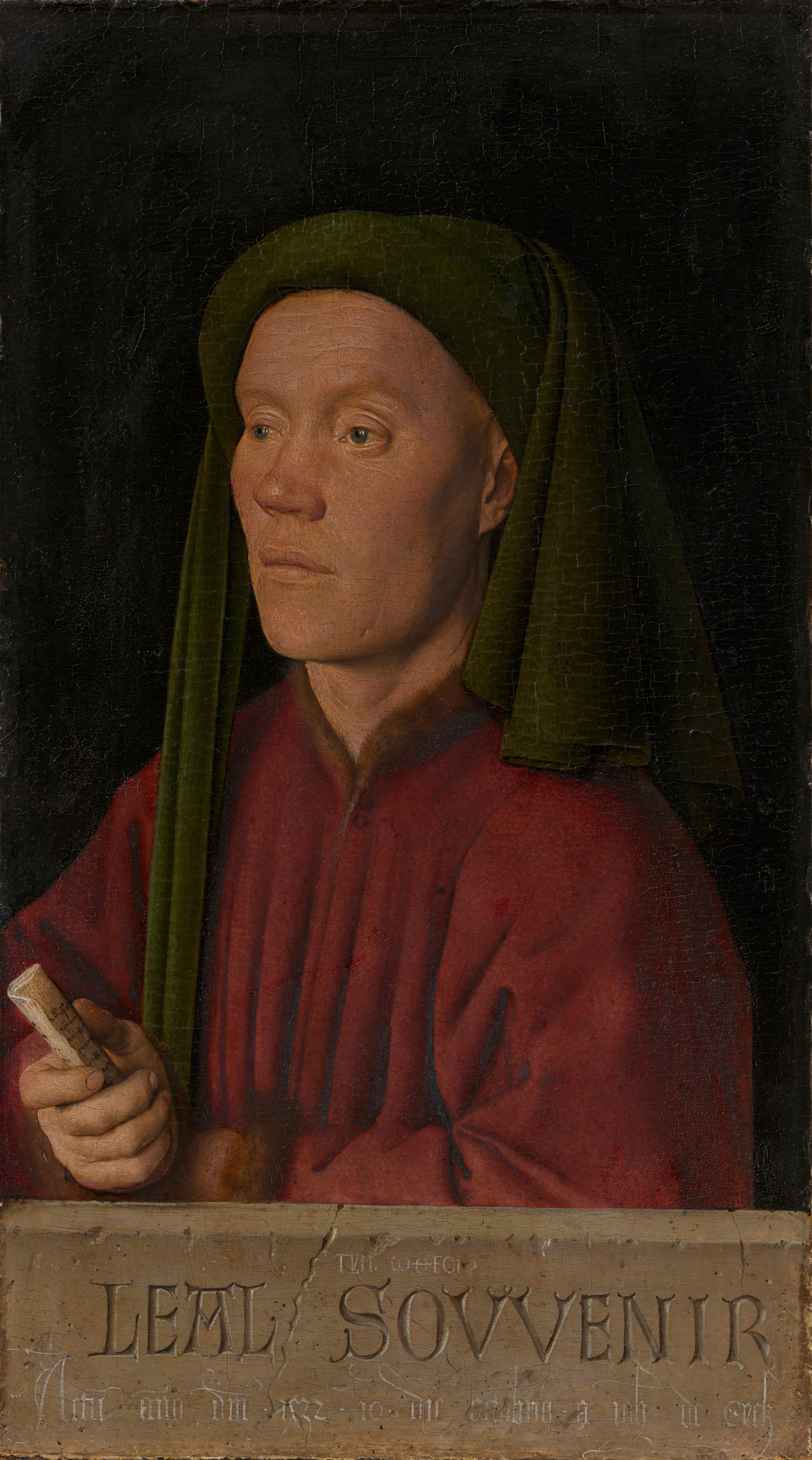
Portrait of a Young Man (Tymotheos) by Jan van Eyck, 1432. The liripipe is draped forward at left (subject's right).

A liripipe (/ˈlɪrɪˌpaɪp/) (Note: Also spelled liri-, lerri-, lyri- lirry- leery- leerepoop(e)/ pope, liri-, lyri-, luri-, leripup, lirripippes, liripipy, liripipion, and liripion.) is an element of clothing, the tail of a hood or cloak, or a long-tailed hood. The modern-day liripipe appears on the hoods of academic dress.

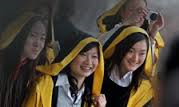
The hooded academic dress of King's College London, an example of a modern-day liripipe.

== Description ==
With long-tailed hoods it includes in particular a chaperon or gugel, or the peak of a shoe. A graffito on the church wall of Swannington Church in Norfolk depicts a "late medieval woman wearing a long, laced gown and hood with a long liripipe ornament."

In modern times, liripipe mostly refers to the tail of the cowl of an academic hood, seen at graduation ceremonies.

Liripipe was popular from the mid-14th to the end of the 15th century. 'Liripipe', and the phrase 'liripipe hood', which are often used by costume historians, are not medieval words but scholarly adoptions dating to the early modern period to describe a fashion which appears very often in medieval art, in the form of a long extension to a hood. It could be worn hanging down, or, by the 15th century, is depicted wrapped round the head or the neck.

== Origins ==
The word is believed to originate from the Medieval Latin term liripipium, which is of unsure origin. Webster's Dictionary suggests it is a corruption of cleri ephippium ("clergy's tippet"), but this is uncertain. The Oxford English Dictionary, attributing the hypothesis to Gilles Ménage, calls it a "ludicrous guess".

Perhaps due to its academic association, the word has the obsolete sense of "part or lesson committed to memory", as in the expressions "to know one's liripipe" and "to teach someone his liripipe".

Another possible origin for the word is that it refers to the resemblance of the hood's "tail" to a long, thin purse used to hold coins, literally a "lira pipe".

== Fashion ==
Liripipe often appears in text as implicit criticism of absurd or exaggerated fashion: in the 1360s the author of the Chronicle Eulogium Historiarum sive Temporis mentions liripipes that hang right down to the heels like ridiculous strips ('liripipia usque talum longa modo fatuorum dilacerata') or worn tied round the head by cross-dressing women.

The term was also applied to the exaggerated toes of the medieval pigache and poulaine shoes, as in a 14th-century statute of Oxford University.

== Other uses ==
The variant spelling liripoop has also the obsolete meaning of "silly person", most probably because it is an inherently funny word, cf. "Nincompoop".

== See also ==
- Academic dress, for more information on hoods.
- Chaperon (headgear)
