= ShitKid =

Swedish singer-songwriter (born 1992)

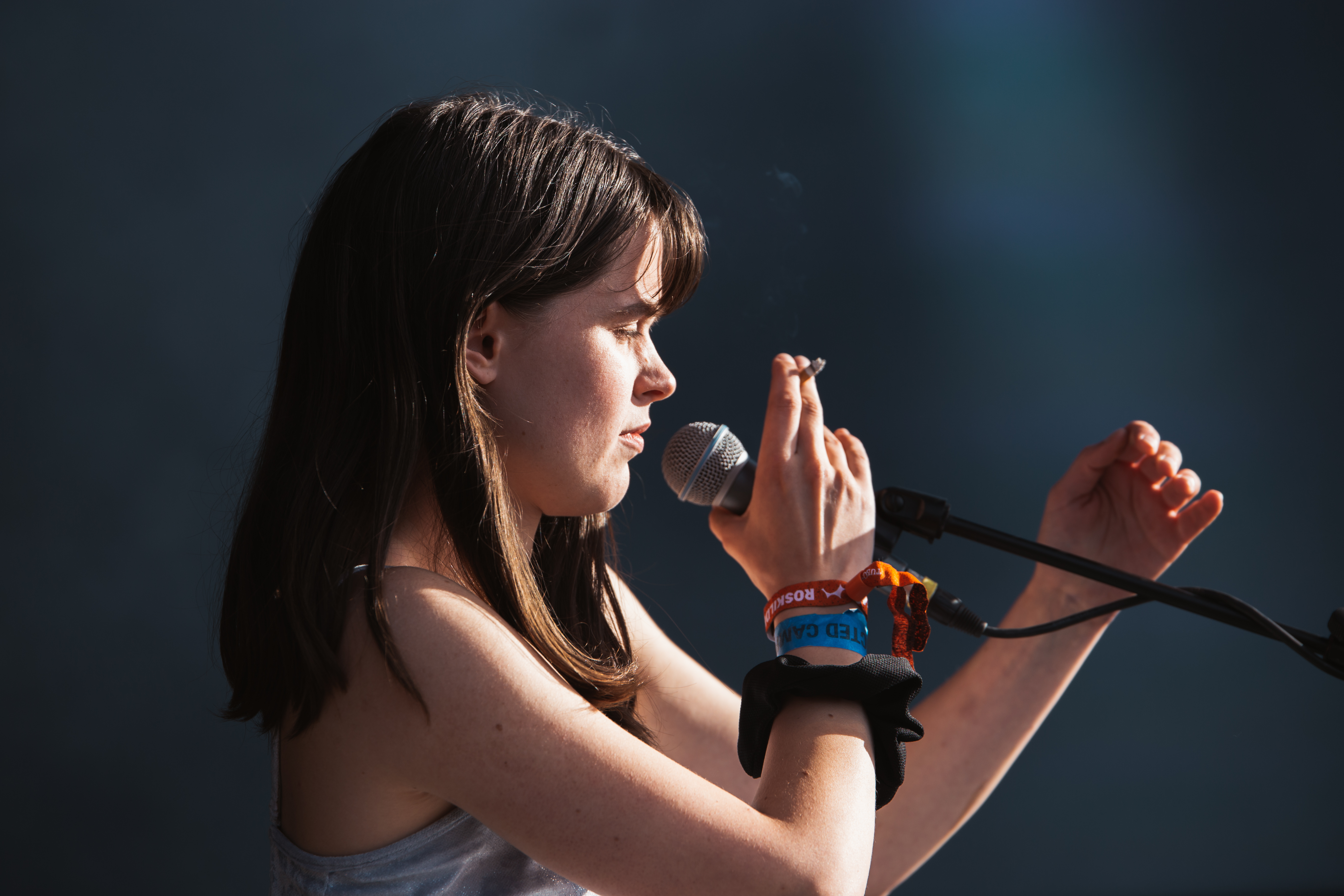

Background information
- Born: Åsa Söderqvist; 1992 (age 33–34)
- Origin: Gothenburg, Sweden
- Genres: Indie rock, lo-fi
- Occupation: Singer-songwriter
- Years active: 2015–present
- Label: PNKSLM Recordings
- Past members: Lina Molarin Ericsson

ShitKid is the stage name of Swedish musician Åsa Söderqvist, who is based in Gothenburg. She began the project in 2015 as a solo endeavor before later expanding it into a band. Her music incorporates elements of indie rock, punk, and pop, and has been noted for its lo-fi production and irregular song structures.

== Early life ==
Åsa Söderqvist was born in 1992 and grew up in northern Sweden before later relocating to Gothenburg. She studied music, including guitar and singing, during high school, but experienced performance anxiety and temporarily stepped away from performing.

== Career ==
Söderqvist began recording music independently and in 2015 uploaded a self-titled EP to the internet. The recordings attracted attention online, particularly for the song "Oh Please Be A Cocky Cool Kid", prompting her to contact PNKSLM Recordings, which remixed and reissued the EP in 2016. The project later expanded into a band, with Söderqvist joined by bassist Lina Molarin Ericsson.

ShitKid's debut studio album Fish was released in 2017. Following the release of Fish, Söderqvist released the EP This Is It in 2018 and the album [DETENTION] in 2019.

In 2020, ShitKid released the album Duo Limbo/"Mellan Himmel å Helvete", which was recorded in 2019 in sessions in Los Angeles and Austin, Texas, featuring Söderqvist and Ericsson.

Ericsson left the band in 2020 following a US tour. Söderqvist released 20/20 ShitKid on September 25, 2020, which was written, recorded, and performed by Söderqvist and marked a return to ShitKid as a solo project.

== Discography ==
=== Studio albums ===
- Fish (2017)
- [DETENTION] (2019)
- Duo Limbo/"Mellan Himmel å Helvete" (2020)
- 20/20 ShitKid (2020)

=== EPs ===
- ShitKid (2016)
- This Is It (2018)
