= Gugel =

Type of hood with a trailing point

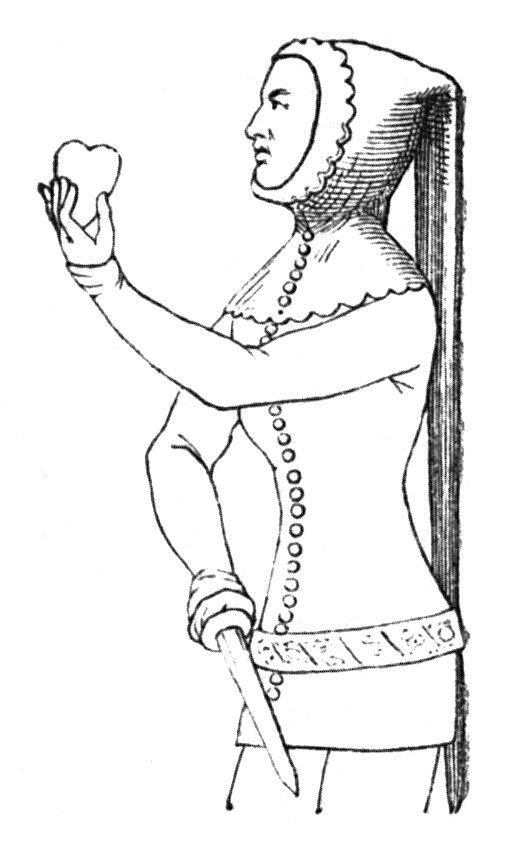
Gugel

A gugel was a type of hood with a trailing point, popularly worn in medieval Germany.

== Description ==
It was tailored to fit the head and shoulders and was usually made from wool or loden. Originally worn by commoners, it became fashionable with the nobility from the 14th century. In the fashionable style, the gugel was worn on top of the head like a hat, with the head part inverted inside the collar, which then hung over the ears.

== Distribution ==
From about 1360, this style of gugel was also worn outside Germany, being called a chaperon in France and a cappucio in Italy. By about 1400 the trailing point was sometimes of enormous proportions.

== See also ==
- Liripipe
- Pointy hat
