= Fireside (band) =

Swedish rock band

- Origin: Luleå, Sweden
- Genres: Post-hardcore; alternative rock; indie rock; emo; pop punk; post-grunge
- Years active: 1992–present
- Labels: Startracks; V2; A West Side Fabrication; Chapel Hill Records
- Spinoffs: Him Kerosene, Easy October
- Spinoff of: Superdong
- Members: Kristofer Åström; Pelle Gunnerfeldt; Kate Breineder; Jacob Douglas
- Past members: Frans Johansson; Fredrik Granberg; Per Nordmark

Fireside is a Swedish rock band that formed in the Swedish hardcore scene in the early 1990s. After finding moderate success as a post-grunge/alternative rock band, yet tiring of playing half-filled venues, Fireside adopted an emo/pop punk sound in 1998. In 2000, with the release of Elite, the band took a more experimental approach to rock, but 2003's All You Had saw the band shift towards garage rock.

After a lengthy hiatus Fireside returned to playing live in 2016 and consequently a new album named Bin Juice was released in 2022. However, only singer/guitarist Kristofer Åström and guitarist/producer Pelle Gunnerfeldt appear on the record, joined by bassist and occasional vocalist Kate Breineder and several drummers.

== Members ==
Current members

- Kristofer Åström – vocals, guitars
- Pelle Gunnerfeldt – guitars
- Kate Breineder – bass, backing vocals
- Jacob Douglas – drums

Former members

- Fredrik Granberg – drums, percussion
- Frans Johansson – bass, guitars
- Per Nordmark – drums, percussion, vibraphone

== Discography ==
=== Albums ===
- Fantastic Four (1994, MNW/A West Side Fabrication) (14 tracks)
- Do Not Tailgate (1995, Startrec) No. 40 SWE (EU 11 tracks / US 13 tracks / JAP 14 tracks)
- Uomini D'onore (1998, Startracks) No. 10 SWE (US 11 tracks (CD & DVD Audio) / JAP 14 tracks)
- Elite (2000, Startracks) No. 40 SWE (9 tracks)
- Get Shot (2003, Startracks/V2) No. 18 SWE (10 tracks)
- Bin Juice (2022, Startracks) (8 tracks)

=== Compilations/reissues ===
- Hello Kids (1997) EU 30 tracks / US 21 tracks (B-sides, covers and out-takes)
- Fantastic Four (1999) 10 tracks (Remixed & remastered tracks from 1994 album, different cover art)

=== Singles/EPs ===
- Softboy EP (1993)
- Jupiter EP (1994)
- Kilotin EP (1995)
- "Left Rustle" (1996) No. 42 SWE
- "Interlace" (1996)
- Sweatbead EP (1997) No. 42 SWE
- "Let Rasputin Do It" (1997)
- "Thing On A Spring" (2000)
- "All You Had" (2003)
- "Follow Follow" (2003)
- "Throw It Away" (2003)

=== Music videos ===
- Kilotin
- Left Rustle
- Sweatbead
- All You Had
- Follow Follow
- The Betrayer
- Jungle Knuckle
