= Viagra Boys =

Swedish post-punk band

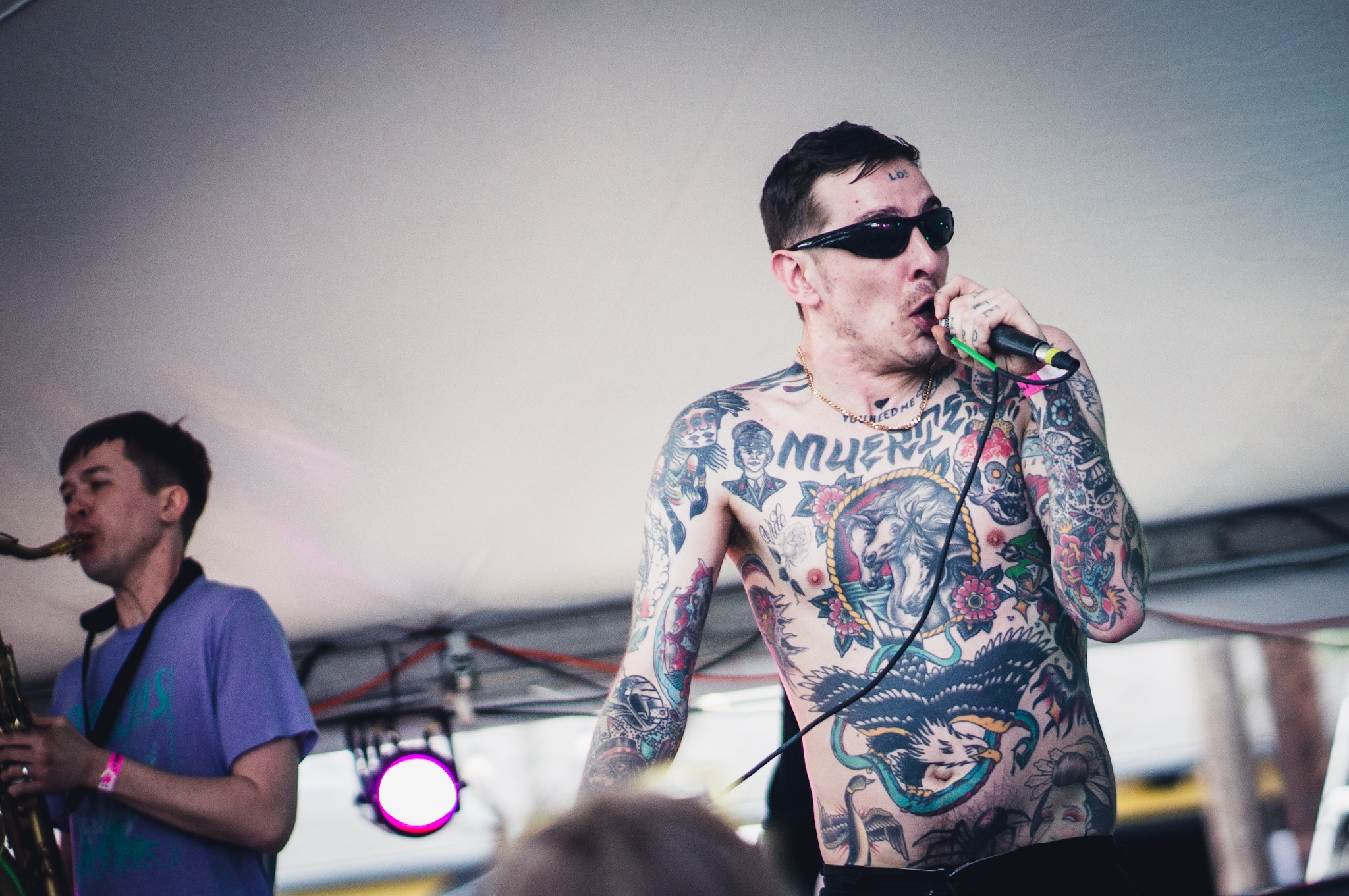
- Viagra Boys performing in March 2019

Background information
- Origin: Stockholm, Sweden
- Genres: Post-punk; art punk; dance-punk; garage punk; cowpunk
- Years active: 2015–present
- Labels: Shrimptech Enterprises; YEAR0001; Kosmos; Push My Buttons
- Members: Sebastian Murphy; Oskar Carls; Henrik Höckert; Tor Sjödén; Elias Jungqvist; Linus Hillborg
- Past members: Benjamin Vallé; Martin Ehrencrona; Rasmus Booberg
- Website: www.vboysstockholm.com

Viagra Boys is a Swedish post-punk band formed in Stockholm in 2015. The line-up currently consists of lead singer Sebastian Murphy alongside musicians Linus Hillborg (guitar), Elias Jungqvist (keyboards), Henrik "Benke" Höckert (bass), Tor Sjödén (drums), and Oskar Carls (saxophone). The band's lyrics are known for using satire and dark humour.

== History ==
Viagra Boys was formed in Stockholm in 2015 by members active in other bands such as Nine, Les Big Byrd, Pig Eyes, Nitad, and Neu-Ronz. Lead singer Sebastian Murphy is the only foreign-born member of the group, being an American from San Rafael, California, who moved to Stockholm to live with his aunt at the age of 17. Born to a Swedish mother and an American father, Murphy is a native speaker of both Swedish and English. A heavy drug and alcohol addict at the time, Murphy worked as a tattoo artist and met the other band members while performing Mariah Carey's song "We Belong Together" at a karaoke night. Murphy is the chief lyricist of the band.

In 2018, the band released their debut album, Street Worms, on the Swedish independent label Year0001. Nils Hansson of Dagens Nyheter described the band favorably, praising their musical style as well as their use of black humor and satire, and rated the album 5/5. In 2019, the band won the Independent Music Companies Association (IMPALA) Album of the Year Award for Street Worms.

The band's second album, Welfare Jazz, was released in January 2021. In October of that same year, founding member and guitarist Benjamin Vallé died at the age of 47. While he appeared on Welfare Jazz, he was not an active member of the band at the time of his death. A deluxe edition of Welfare Jazz released in 2022, featuring new album art and seven new tracks.

Viagra Boys' third studio album, Cave World, was released in July 2022. The band played at multiple festivals in 2022, including Coachella and Primavera Sound, and performed at Glastonbury in 2023. While touring in support of Cave World, they recorded a concert film during their February 23, 2023 show at The Salt Shed, which was later streamed and released for free on YouTube. Viagra Boys won the Swedish Grammis award for Rock of the Year in 2023, and supported Queens of the Stone Age during their North American tour that same year.

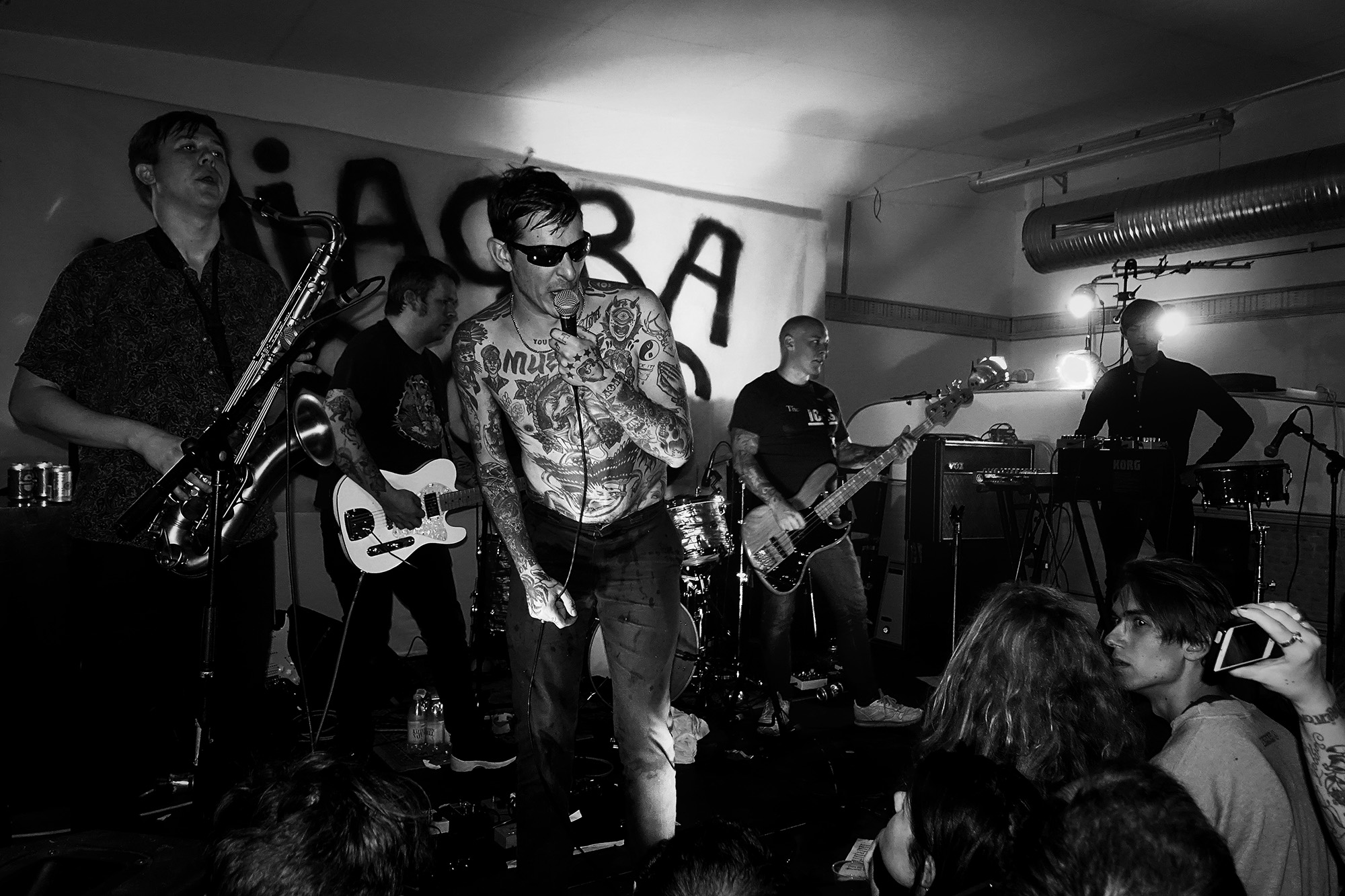
Viagra Boys performing at PlanB Malmö, Sweden

In January 2025, Viagra Boys announced Viagr Aboys, which was released on 25 April via their newly launched label Shrimptech Enterprises. That year they also embarked on the infinite anxiety tour in support of the album, playing shows across Europe, North America, Oceania, and Japan. The tour included the band's biggest shows to-date, including performances at Alexandra Palace in London and Avicii Arena in Stockholm.

== Musical style ==
Much of the band's lyrics focus on ridiculing hypermasculinity, far-right politics, and conspiracy theories. Speaking of his lyrics, Murphy said "Half of it is an act, and half of it is like a diary in a way. I don't do it consciously, but subconsciously it becomes satire of myself and others".

They have cited influences including the Fall, the Birthday Party, Devo, Suicide, Butthole Surfers, the Jesus Lizard, the Stooges, Captain Beefheart, Dead Kennedys, Nirvana, the Pixies, the Breeders, Queens of the Stone Age, Kyuss, Slipknot and Metallica's album St. Anger.

== Members ==
=== Current members ===
- Sebastian Murphy – lead vocals (2015–present)
- Henrik "Benke" Höckert – bass guitar (2015–present), backing vocals (2021–present)
- Tor Sjödén – drums (2015–present), backing vocals (2021–present)
- Oskar Carls – saxophone, flute (2015–present), guitar (2017–present)
- Elias Jungqvist – keyboards, percussion (2019–present), backing vocals (2021–present)
- Linus Hillborg – guitar, backing vocals (2021–present)

=== Former members ===
- Benjamin Vallé – guitar (2015–2021; died 2021)
- Martin Ehrencrona – keyboards, synthesizer (2015–2019)
- Rasmus Booberg – percussion, guitar (2015–2017)

== Discography ==
=== Albums ===
- Street Worms (2018)
- Welfare Jazz (2021)
- Cave World (2022)
- Viagr Aboys (2025)

=== Extended plays ===
- Consistency of Energy (2016)
- Call of the Wild (2017)
- Common Sense (2020)

=== Live albums ===
- Shrimp Sessions (2019)
- Shrimp Sessions 2 (2021)
- Shrimp Sessions Live! IV (2025)

=== Singles ===
- "Sports" (2018)
- "Just Like You" (2018)
- "Ain't Nice" (2020)
- "Creatures" (2020)
- "In Spite of Ourselves" (with Amy Taylor) (2020)
- "Girls & Boys" (2021)
- "Ain't No Thief" (2022)
- "Troglodyte" (2022)
- "Punk Rock Loser" (2022)
- "Big Boy" (with Jason Williamson) (2022)
- "Man Made of Meat" (2025)
- "Uno II" (2025)
- “The Bog Body” (2025)
- "Therapy II" (2026)

=== Music videos ===
List of music videos, showing year released and director
Year	Title	Album	Director(s)
2015	"Research Chemicals"	Consistency of Energy - EP	
2018	"Sports"	Street Worms	Simon Jung
2019	"Just Like You"	Street Worms	Simon Jung
2020	"Ain't Nice"	Welfare Jazz	SNASK
2020	"Creatures"	Welfare Jazz	SNASK
2020	"In Spite of Ourselves"	Welfare Jazz	André Jofré
2022	"Ain't no Thief"	Cave World	SNASK
2022	"Punk Rock Loser"	Cave World	SNASK
2022	"Big Boy"	Cave World	André Jofré
2023	"Troglodyte"	Cave World	Cissi Efraimsson
2025	"Man Made of Meat"	Viagr Aboys	Daniel Björkman
2025	"Uno II"	Viagr Aboys	André Jofré & Sebastian Murphy
2025	"The Bog Body"	Viagr Aboys	Eoin Glaister

== Awards and nominations ==
=== Berlin Music Video Awards ===
The Berlin Music Video Awards is an international festival that promotes the art of music videos.

Year	Nominated work	Award	Result	Ref.
2026	"The Bog Body"	Most Bizarre	Won	
