= Street Worms =

Studio album by Viagra Boys
- Released: 28 September 2018
- Recorded: April–June 2018
- Studio: Ingrid Studios, Stockholm; Studio Rymden, Stockholm
- Genre: Post-punk
- Length: 36:45
- Label: YEAR0001
- Producer: Daniel Fagerström; Pelle Gunnerfeldt

Viagra Boys chronology
| Call of the Wind (2017) | Street Worms (2018) | Common Sense (2020) |

Singles from Street Worms
- 1. "Sports" Released: 13 August 2018; 2. "Just Like You" Released: 30 August 2018

Street Worms is the debut studio album by Swedish post-punk band, Viagra Boys. The album was released on 28 September 2018 through YEAR0001.

== Background ==
Ahead of the release of the album, two singles were released: "Sports" came out in mid August 2018, and at the end of August 2018, the single "Just Like You" came out.

In an interview with The Fader, the band stated that the album is focused on discussing and criticizing hypermasculinity and right-wing populism in Europe.

== Critical reception ==
Professional ratings
Aggregate scores
| Source | Rating |
|---|---|
| Metacritic | 80/100 |
Review scores
| Source | Rating |
| Loud and Quiet | 8/10 |
| musicOMH | 4/5 stars |
| Q | 4/5 stars |
| The 405 | 7.5/10 |
| Pitchfork | 7.4/10 |

Street Worms was well received by music critics. On review aggregator website, Metacritic, it received an average rating of 80 out of 100 based on four professional critic reviews, indicating "generally favorable reviews".

=== Accolades ===
Street Worms was also included in some best-albums-of-2018 year-end lists, notably ranking in those by Gaffa Sweden (11th), Loud and Quiet (14th), and NME (57th).

== Track listing ==
All tracks are written by Oskar Carls, Martin Ehrencrona, Henrik Höckert, Sebastian Murphy, Tor Sjöden and Benjamin Vallé, except where noted.

| No. | Title | Length |
|---|---|---|
| 1. | "Down in the Basement" | 3:36 |
| 2. | "Slow Learner" | 3:11 |
| 3. | "Sports" | 3:58 |
| 4. | "Best in Show" | 1:48 |
| 5. | "Just Like You" | 5:32 |
| 6. | "Shrimp Shack" | 6:11 |
| 7. | "Frogstrap" | 3:15 |
| 8. | "Worms" | 3:28 |
| 9. | "Amphetanarchy" | 5:46 |
| Total length: | | 36:45 |

Deluxe edition bonus tracks
| No. | Title | Writer(s) | Length |
|---|---|---|---|
| 10. | "Jungle Man" | | 3:11 |
| 11. | "Beijing Taxi" | | 4:07 |
| 12. | "Up All Night" | | 3:42 |
| 13. | "Special Helmet" | | 3:11 |
| 14. | "I Ain't Living Long Like This" (Gary Stewart cover) | Rodney Crowell | 3:41 |
| Total length: | | | 54:32 |

== Personnel ==
Credits adapted from the liner notes of Street Worms.

Viagra Boys

- Sebastian Murphy – vocals
- Henrik Höckert – bass
- Tor Sjödén – drums
- Oskar Carls – saxophone
- Benjamin Vallé – guitar
- Martin Ehrencrona – synthesizer

Technical

- Daniel Fagerström – producer (2–5, 9–11, 13)
- Pelle Gunnerfeldt – producer (1, 6–8, 12, 14), mixing
- Daniel Bengtsson – engineer (2–5, 9–11, 13)
- Johan Gustafsson – engineer (1, 6–8, 12, 14)
- Robin Schmidt – mastering
- Stefan Fält – artwork, visual concept
- Sebastian Murphy – illustration
- Louise Enhörning – photography
