= 2025 in rock music =

This article summarizes the events related to rock music for the year of 2025.

== Notable events ==
=== January ===
- Scottish rock band Franz Ferdinand releases their sixth studio album, The Human Fear, their first in seven years, following Always Ascending (2018). It charts in the top 10 of 5 national album charts including topping the Scottish albums chart. It is their second album to top the Scottish chart, following You Could Have It So Much Better (2005), and continues their streak of all seven of their studio albums debuting in the top 3 of the chart.
- Many rock bands perform at FireAid, a two day benefit concert to help raise funds for those affected by the January 2025 Southern California wildfires. Performers include Green Day, Red Hot Chili Peppers, No Doubt and Alanis Morissette.
- Nirvana also reforms for a surprise brief performance at FireAid. The lineup included bassist Krist Novoselic, drummer Dave Grohl, rhythm guitarist Pat Smear, and four separate female vocalists in place of frontman Kurt Cobain. St. Vincent performed the song "Breed", Kim Gordon of Sonic Youth performed on "School", Joan Jett performed on "Territorial Pissings", and Grohl's daughter Violet Grohl on "All Apologies". The performance is one of only a handful of reformations of the band after their breakup in 1994, following the death of Kurt Cobain.

=== February ===
- The 67th Annual Grammy Awards are held. Classic rock acts perform well; The Beatles win Best Rock Performance for one of their final recordings to be released - "Now and Then", while The Rolling Stones win Best Rock Album for their first album in 18 years, Hackney Diamonds.
- St. Vincent wins three Grammy Awards - "Broken Man" wins Best Rock Song, "Flea" wins Best Alternative Music Performance, and All Born Screaming wins Best Alternative Music Album.
- Dream Theater releases their 16th studio album, Parasomnia. It is their first studio album with original drummer Mike Portnoy since Black Clouds & Silver Linings (2009). It debuts in the top 10 of 13 separate national album charts.
- Welsh rock band Manic Street Preachers releases their 15th studio album, Critical Thinking. It debuts in the top 2 of the UK and Scottish album charts.
- Japanese rock band One Ok Rock releases their eleventh studio album, Detox. It debuts at number two on the Japanese all-format Oricon chart.
- English metalcore band Architects releases their eleventh studio album, The Sky, the Earth & All Between. It was produced by former Bring Me the Horizon keyboardist Jordan Fish. It debuts in the top 10 of 6 separate national album charts.
- As part of the 50th Anniversary of Saturday Night Live, NBC broadcasts a one-time concert performance called SNL50: The Homecoming Concert, featuring a variety of musical acts from the show's history. Rock acts include Eddie Vedder, Jack White, Chris Martin, and Arcade Fire.

=== March ===
- English rock band Jethro Tull releases their 24th studio album, Curious Ruminant. It debuts in the top 5 of 3 separate national album charts.
- English rock musician Steven Wilson (frontman of Porcupine Tree) releases his eighth solo studio album, The Overview. It is a concept album themed around the idea of the overview effect, consisting of two approximately 20 minute songs. It debuts in the top 3 of 5 separate national album charts.
- English hard rock band The Darkness releases their eighth studio album, Dreams on Toast. It is their first studio album since Motorheart (2021). It debuts at number 2 on the UK and Scottish album charts.

=== April ===
- Australian heavy metal band Thornhill releases their third studio album, Bodies. It is their first studio album without guitarist Matt van Duppen, who switched his role from the band's guitarist to the band's manager. It debuts at number 4 on the Australian national albums chart.
- Dutch symphonic metal band Epica releases their ninth studio album, Aspiral. It debuts in the top 5 of 3 separate national album charts, including at number 2 on the Dutch national albums chart.
- Swedish post-punk band Viagra Boys releases their fourth studio album, Viagr Aboys. It debuts in the top 10 of 2 separate national album charts, including at number 7 on the Swedish national albums chart.
- Machine Head releases their eleventh studio album, Unatoned. It is their first studio album with new guitarist Reece Scruggs, who replaced the band's previous guitarist Wacław Kiełtyka in 2024. It debuts in the top 10 of 3 separate national album charts.
- Swedish rock band Ghost release their sixth studio album, Skeletá. It became their first album to top the US all-format Billboard 200 albums chart, the first rock album to top the chart in 2025, the first rock album to top the chart since October 2024's Moon Music by Coldplay, and the first hard rock album to top the chart since 2020's Power Up by AC/DC.

=== May ===
- English band Sleep Token releases their fourth studio album, Even in Arcadia. It debuts at the top of 9 separate national album charts. In the US, it tops the Billboard 200, moving 127,000 album equivalent units. It marks the highest debut for a rock band in almost a year, the biggest debut for a hard rock band in 2 years, and has the highest single week streams for a hard rock band ever. Additionally, all 10 of the album's songs chart on the Hot 100, an extremely rare feat for a rock or heavy metal band.
- Linkin Park headlines the opening ceremony of the 2025 UEFA Champions League final at the Allianz Arena in Munich, Germany.

=== June ===
- Danish rock band Volbeat releases their ninth studio album, God of Angels Trust. They started working on it after their 2023 summer tour. Frontman Michael Poulsen underwent a throat surgery in October 2023, which prevented the band from performing live shows in 2024. It debuts in the top 5 of 9 separate national album charts.
- Turnstile releases their fourth studio album, Never Enough. It is their first studio album without founding lead guitarist Brady Ebert, who left the band in 2022. It debuts in the top 10 of 5 separate national album charts. In the US, it debuts at number 9 on the Billboard 200 chart, moving 38,000 album equivalent units, their first released to break into the top 10 of the chart.
- 25 years after its initial release, Coldplay song "Sparks" had a resurgence of popularity following a live performance from the Music of the Spheres World Tour that went viral. This led the song to chart on the Billboard Hot 100 for the first time.
- British musician Yungblud releases his fourth studio album, Idols. It tops 5 national albums charts, including the UK, where it is his third consecutive album to top the chart, following Weird! (2020) and Yungblud (2022).

=== July ===
- American band Alice Cooper releases their eighth studio album, The Revenge of Alice Cooper. While Alice Cooper maintained a prolific solo-career, it is the band's first studio album in over 50 years, since Muscle of Love (1973), and features all five of the original members of the band. It debuts in the top 10 of 7 separate national album charts.
- Ozzy Osbourne's final concert prior to his death, Back to the Beginning, raises more money for charity than any concert since George Harrison and Ravi Shankar's Concert for Bangladesh in 1971. In addition to the reformation of the original lineup of Black Sabbath, many rock and metal artists performed, including Tool, Metallica, Guns N' Roses, Alice in Chains, and a variety of collaborations lead event director Tom Morello.
- English indie rock band Wet Leg releases their second studio album, Moisturizer. It tops the UK albums chart. Leading up to the album's release, the band's female lead singer, Rhian Teasdale, received negative feedback online for having hair on her armpits. In response, she reported that armpits would be shaved if the album reached number 1. Upon confirmation of topping the chart, the band released a video of the male band members shaving their armpits instead.
- A mid-year report released by sales data company Luminate showed rock music as the second biggest core genre in the US in their on-demand audio streaming data, behind the hip hop/R&B grouping. Rock music also had the greatest increase since the prior years report as well.

=== August ===
- Deftones releases their tenth studio album, Private Music. It debuts in the top 5 of 12 separate national album charts. In the US, it debuts at number 5, moving 87,000 album equivalent units in its first week. The album is their fifth to debut in the top 5 of the Billboard 200 chart. The album's lead single, "My Mind Is a Mountain", goes on to be the band's first song to top the Billboard Mainstream Rock chart, 27 years after the first time they first had a song chart on it. The song "Infinite Source" concurrently debuted atop of the Hot Hard Rock Songs chart.
- Swedish garage rock band The Hives releases their seventh studio album, The Hives Forever Forever the Hives. It debuts in the top 5 of 3 separate national album charts.
- Yellowcard tops the Billboard Alternative Airplay chart with their single "Better Days", their first time topping a chart in their almost 30 year career. The song is off of their album of the same name, their first album in almost a decade.

=== September ===
- Twenty One Pilots releases their eighth studio album, Breach. It is a concept album, and concludes the overarching story being told across the band's previous four studio albums. It debuts in the top 5 of 17 separate national album charts. In the US, it tops the all-format Billboard 200 chart, moving 200,000 album equivalent units, making it the highest performing rock album since Tool's Fear Inoculum in 2019, and consequently the biggest debut for a rock album in the 2020s. It is their second album to top the chart, after Blurryface (2015). One of the album's singles, "City Walls", also finds crossover success, peaking at number 83 on the Hot 100 chart.
- Scottish rock band Biffy Clyro releases their tenth studio album, Futique. It debuts at the top of the Scottish, and the UK national album charts. It is the band's fourth album to top the UK chart.
- Nine Inch Nails releases the Tron: Ares soundtrack to the 2025 film of the same name. It is the band's first music released since Ghosts V and Ghosts VI (2020). It tops the US Billboard Top Soundtrack albums chart, and peaks at number 5 on the all-format Billboard 200 albums chart.
- Stevie Nicks and Lindsey Buckingham of Fleetwood Mac re-release their collaborative album Buckingham Nicks. The album, originally recorded and released back in 1973, was their first collaboration, prior to forming the band, and was largely overshadowed by the band's later success. The re-release marks the first time it is released on CD and streaming formats, and pushes the album into the top 10 of four national albums charts. In the US, it just misses the top 10 of the Billboard 200, peaking at number 11.

=== October ===
- British rock band The Last Dinner Party releases their second studio album, From the Pyre. It debuts at number 2 on the UK all-format albums chart, only stopped from topping the chart, like their previous album had, by Taylor Swift.
- Brandi Carlile releases her eighth studio album, Returning to Myself. It debuts at number seven on the Billboard 200, moving 35,000 album equivalent units.

=== November ===
- Up and coming English musician Yungblud and long-running American rock band Aerosmith release a collaborative EP, One More Time. In the UK, it tops the all-format albums chart, which is a first in Aerosmith's 50 year career. In the US, it makes the top ten of the all-format Billboard 200 chart, which is a first for Yungblud's career.
- The White Stripes and Soundgarden are inducted into the Rock and Roll Hall of Fame.

=== December ===
- Three Days Grace's single "Kill Me Fast" tops the Billboard Mainstream Rock chart, and stays there for six consecutive weeks, longer than any other song that year. Its also their twentieth song to top the chart, which is the second most of any artist, behind Shinedown. Around the same time, their single "Mayday" tops the year-end iteration of the chart.
- It is announced that Oasis's reunion tour, Oasis Live '25 Tour, is the second highest grossing tour in the world for 2025, only behind Beyonce's Cowboy Carter Tour. Due to pricing differences, Oasis actually sold more tickets at the same time.
- Sleep Token is declared top hard rock artist of 2025 in the US by Billboard due to the performance of their album Even in Arcadia.
- The New York Times publishes and article asserting that while rock music's commercial and cultural relevance continues to decline, it continues to influence other genre and blends together into varying rock genre more than ever. It also asserts that rocks bands such as Geese, Turnstile, and The Armed still managed to make cultural impact in 2025.

== Albums released ==
=== January ===
Day	Artist	Album
10	Franz Ferdinand	The Human Fear
23	Flipturn	Burnout Days
24	Oni	Genesis (EP)
31	All That Remains	Antifragile

=== February ===
Day	Artist	Album
7	Jinjer	Duél
7	Dream Theater	Parasomnia
7	Heartworms	Glutton for Punishment
14	Lacuna Coil	Sleepless Empire
14	Manic Street Preachers	Critical Thinking
21	One Ok Rock	Detox
21	Silverstein	Antibloom
21	Killswitch Engage	This Consequence
28	Architects	The Sky, the Earth & All Between

=== March ===
Day	Artist	Album
7	Jethro Tull	Curious Ruminant
7	Spiritbox	Tsunami Sea
14	Steven Wilson	The Overview
28	Alien Weaponry	Te Rā
28	The Darkness	Dreams on Toast
28	Memphis May Fire	Shapeshifter
28	Underoath	The Place After This One

=== April ===
Day	Artist	Album
4	Thornhill	Bodies
4	Scowl	Are We All Angels
11	Epica	Aspiral
11	Magnolia Park	Vamp
18	Superheaven	Superheaven
23	Ave Mujica	Completeness
25	Viagra Boys	Viagr Aboys
25	Heart Attack Man	Joyride the Pale Horse
25	Machine Head	Unatoned
25	Ghost	Skeletá

=== May ===
Day	Artist	Album
9	Kaleo	Mixed Emotions
9	Sleep Token	Even in Arcadia
16	Sleep Theory	Afterglow
30	Garbage	Let All That We Imagine Be the Light
30	Stray from the Path	Clockworked

=== June ===
Day	Artist	Album
6	Volbeat	God of Angels Trust
6	Turnstile	Never Enough
20	Hotline TNT	Raspberry Moon
27	Hot Milk	Corporation P.O.P
27	Wavves	Spun

=== July ===
Day	Artist	Album
25	Alice Cooper	The Revenge of Alice Cooper

=== August ===
Day	Artist	Album
1	Oni	Genesis, Pt. II (EP)
8	Halestorm	Everest
15	Chevelle	Bright as Blasphemy
15	Rise Against	Ricochet
22	Deftones	Private Music
22	Three Days Grace	Alienation
22	Goo Goo Dolls	Summer Anthem (EP)
29	The Hives	The Hives Forever Forever the Hives
29	Helloween	Giants & Monsters

=== September ===
Day	Artist	Album
5	Beauty School Dropout	Where Did All the Butterflies Go?
12	Teenage Bottlerocket	Ready to Roll
12	Silverstein	Pink Moon
12	Twenty One Pilots	Breach
19	Biffy Clyro	Futique
19	Nine Inch Nails	Tron: Ares Soundtrack
26	Sprints	All That Is Over
26	President	King of Terrors (EP)
29	La Vida Bohème	Tierra de Nadie

=== October ===
Day	Artist	Album
3	AFI	Silver Bleeds the Black Sun...
17	Militarie Gun	God Save the Gun
24	Dayseeker	Creature in the Black Night
24	Mammoth	The End

=== November ===
Day	Artist	Album
7	Finger Eleven	Last Night on Earth
7	Set It Off	Set It Off
14	Cheap Trick	All Washed Up
14	Violent Vira	Lover of a Ghost
28	Kensington	First Rodeo

== Tours and festivals ==
- Sonic Temple festival was held May 8-11, 2025. It was headlined by Linkin Park, Metallica, and Korn, and featured many other bands including Alice in Chains, Bullet for My Valentine, and Bad Omens.
- Welcome to Rockville was held May 15-18, 2025. It was headlined by Green Day, Linkin Park, Korn, and Shinedown, and featured many other bands including Bowling for Soup, Taking Back Sunday, Real Friends, and Three Days Grace.
- Slam Dunk Festival was held on 24-25 May. It was headlined by Neck Deep, Electric Callboy, and A Day to Remember, and featured many other bands including Alkaline Trio, Hot Milk, and Zebrahead.
- Punk Rock Bowling Music Festival was held May 24-26, 2025. It was headlined by Social Distortion, Cock Sparrer, and Peter Hook & the Light, and featured many other bands including Fidlar, The Damned, Power Trip, and The Interrupters.
- Download Festival was held 13-15 June 2025. It was headlined by Green Day, Korn, and Sleep Token, and featured many other bands including Within Temptation, Sex Pistols, Steel Panther, and Jimmy Eat World.
- Warped Tour returned for the first time in six years to celebrate its 30th anniversary. Three festivals took place in June, July, and November.
- English rock band Oasis reforms for the first time in 15 years for their Oasis Live '25 Tour. The announcement ends 15 years of bitter feuds between brothers Noel Gallagher and Liam Gallagher, who previously denied that any reunion would take effect.
- English heavy metal band Black Sabbath announces a reunion with all four original members for one final concert. It took place at Villa Park in Birmingham, England, on 5 July 2025.
- Louder Than Life festival took place September 18-21, 2025. It was headlined by Deftones, Slayer, Avenged Sevenfold, and Bring Me the Horizon.
- Riot Fest took place September 19-21, 2025. It was headlined by Blink-182, Green Day, and Weezer.
- Shaky Knees Music Festival took place September 19-21, 2025. It was headlined by Blink-182, Deftones, and My Chemical Romance, and also featured Soft Play, Devo, Franz Ferdinand, and Pixies.
- Aftershock Festival took place October 2-5, 2025. It was headlined by Blink-182, Deftones, Korn, and Bring Me the Horizon.
- When We Were Young festival took place on October 18, 2025. It was headlined by Blink-182, and Panic! at the Disco, and featured many other bands including The Story So Far, Holding Absence, Sleeping with Sirens, Weezer.

== Band breakups ==
- Australian metalcore band Void of Vision broke up following a final headline tour in Australia in February 2025.
- Canadian rock band Sum 41 broke up following the release of their eighth and final studio album Heaven :x: Hell (2024), and a final worldwide headlining tour that ended in January 2025. The band officially disbanded after their induction in the Canadian Music Hall of Fame, and performed one final live performance at the 54th annual Juno Awards in March 2025.
- English rock band You Me at Six broke up after over 20 years of performing following a final tour that ended in April 2025.
- Stray from the Path disbanded following a surprise release of their eleventh and final studio album, Clockworked, and a final tour that ended in November 2025.
- Swedish hardcore punk band Refused disbanded in December 2025, following a farewell tour and the 25th anniversary re-release of their third studio album The Shape of Punk to Come (1998), which included an accompanying tribute album of other artist's covers and remixes of the material.

== Deaths ==
- January 6 – Fredrik Lindgren, 53, Swedish death metal guitarist (Unleashed)
- January 13 – Peter "P. Fluid" Forrest, 64, American rock musician (24-7 Spyz)
- January 21 – Garth Hudson, 87, Canadian rock multi-instrumentalist (The Band)
- January 29 – Bruce Howe, 77, Australian progressive rock bassist and singer (Fraternity)
- February 1 – Sal Maida, 76, American rock bassist (Milk 'N' Cookies, Roxy Music, Sparks)
- February 17 – Rick Buckler, 69, English rock drummer (The Jam)
- February 19 – Snowy Fleet, 79, English-born Australian rock drummer (The Easybeats)
- February 28 – David Johansen, 75, American progressive rock singer (New York Dolls)
- March 15 – Les Binks, 73, Northern Irish heavy metal drummer (Judas Priest)
- April 6 – Clem Burke, 70, American rock drummer (Blondie)
- April 28 – Mike Peters, 66, Welsh rock singer (The Alarm)
- May 5 – James Baker, 71, Australian rock drummer (The Victims, The Scientists, Hoodoo Gurus, Beasts of Bourbon)
- May 19 – Adam Ramey, 32, American rap metal singer (Dropout Kings)
- June 9 – Sly Stone, 82, American funk and rock musician (Sly and the Family Stone)
- June 11 – Brian Wilson, 82, American rock musician (The Beach Boys)
- June 11 – Mick Ralphs, 81, English rock guitarist (Mott the Hoople, Bad Company)
- June 27 – Derek A. E. Fuhrmann, 44, American rock singer-songwriter (The Crash Motive)
- 22 July
  - George Kooymans, 77, Dutch rock singer and guitarist (Golden Earring)
  - Ozzy Osbourne, 76, English heavy metal/rock singer-songwriter (Black Sabbath)
- July 29 – Paul Mario Day, 69, English heavy metal singer (Iron Maiden)
- August 4 – Terry Reid, 75, English rock singer-songwriter and guitarist
- August 10 – Bobby Whitlock, 77, American rock singer-songwriter and keyboardist (Derek and the Dominos)
- August 20 – Brent Hinds, 51, American heavy metal guitarist (Mastodon)
- September 6 – Rick Davies, 81, English rock singer-songwriter and keyboardist (Supertramp)
- 16 September – Tomas "Tompa" Lindberg, 52, Swedish melodic death metal singer (At the Gates)
- 25 September – Chris Dreja, 78, English rock bass guitarist (The Yardbirds)
- 10 October
  - John Lodge, 82, English rock bassist and singer (The Moody Blues)
  - Thommy Price, 68, American rock drummer (Scandal, Love Crushed Velvet, Joan Jett and the Blackhearts)
- 11 October – Ian Watkins, 48, Welsh rock singer (Lostprophets)
- October 16 – Ace Frehley, 74, American rock guitarist and singer (Kiss)
- 18 October – Sam Rivers, 48, American nu metal bassist (Limp Bizkit)
- 20 November – Gary "Mani" Mounfield, 63, English rock bassist (The Stone Roses, Primal Scream)
- 3 December – Steve Cropper, 84, American R&B guitarist (Booker T. & the M.G.'s, The Blues Brothers)
- 22 December – Chris Rea, 74, English soft rock and blues singer-songwriter and guitarist
- 26 December – Perry Bamonte, 65, English rock guitarist and keyboardist (The Cure)
