= Everything Ends =

Everything Ends may refer to:

- "Everything Ends" by Slipknot from the album Iowa, 2001
- "Everything Ends" (Architects song) from the album The Sky, the Earth & All Between, 2025
