= Infinite Source =

Song by Deftones

from the album Private Music
- Released: August 22, 2025
- Genre: Shoegaze; post-punk
- Length: 3:33
- Label: Reprise; Warner
- Composers: Abe Cunningham; Chino Moreno; Frank Delgado; Fred Sablan; Stephen Carpenter
- Lyricist: Moreno
- Producers: Cunningham; Moreno; Delgado; Carpenter; Nick Raskulinecz

Music video
- "Infinite Source" on YouTube

"Infinite Source" (stylized in all lowercase) is a song recorded by the American alternative metal band Deftones. It was released on August 22, 2025 via Reprise Records and Warner Records, as a member of Deftones' tenth studio album, Private Music. The song's lyrics were written by Chino Moreno and composed by Abe Cunningham, Moreno, Frank Delgado, Fred Sablan and Stephen Carpenter. It was produced by Cunningham, Moreno, Delgado, Carpenter, and Nick Raskulinecz.

== Release and promotion ==
Upon the release of Private Music, "Infinite Source" was promoted with a music video, which was uploaded to YouTube. The video was directed by Aaron Hymes. On December 19, 2025, a live music video, which was also directed by Hymes, was released exclusively to members of Deftones' mailing list. The video was unofficially made publicly available after being shared online through fan communities. "Infinite Source" has also circulated into Deftones' performance setlist for their 2026 European and South American arena tours.

== Development ==
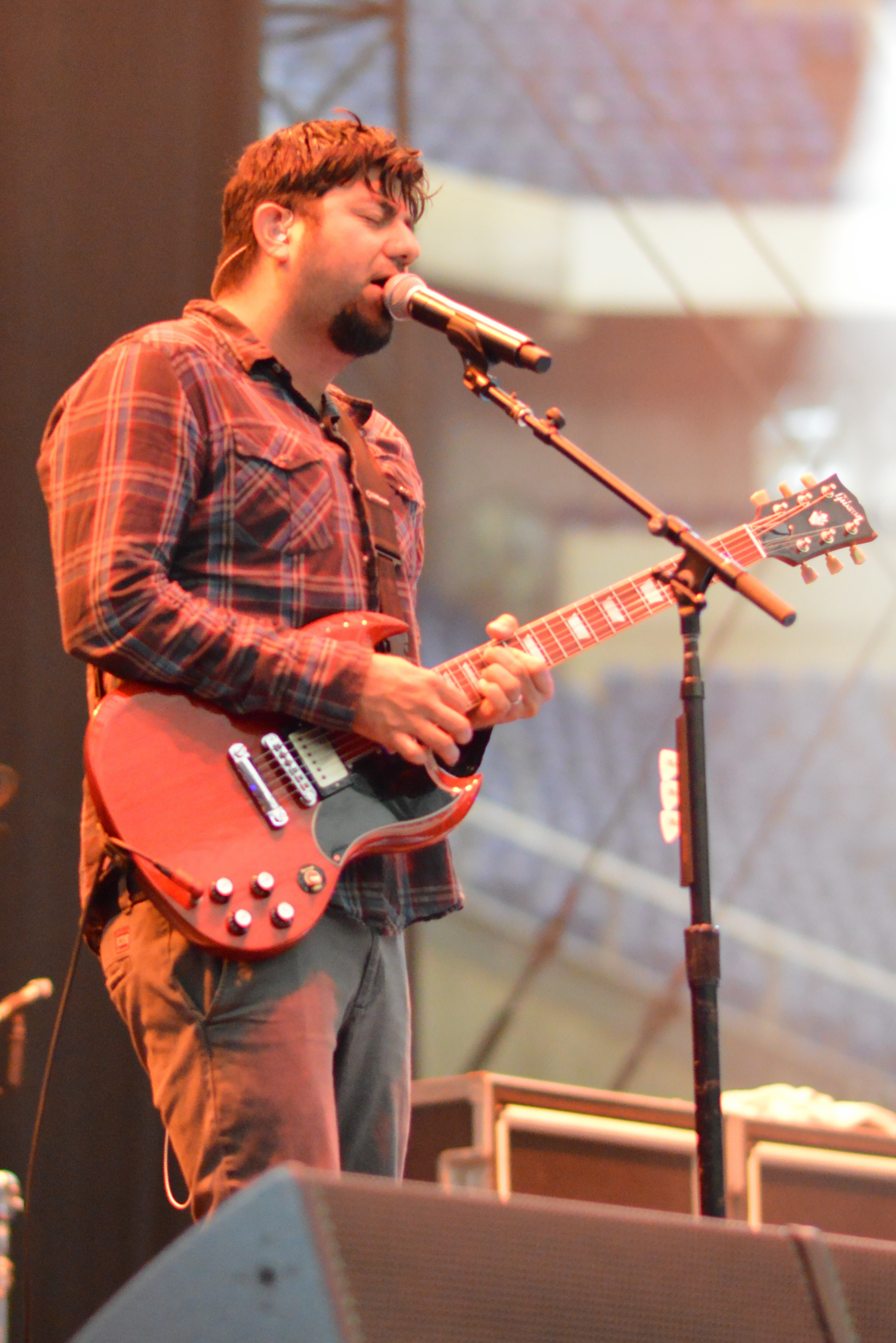
Chino Moreno, who wrote and co-produced "Infinite Source"

=== Lyrics and structure ===
Lyrically, "Infinite Source" contains themes of connection, memory, and closure. The verses speak of tension between private and outward presentation. There are instances of repeating the phrases "facing the crowd" and "holding tight" which intend to illustrate this. The refrain references the "last time adorning the stage" and a "final wave and bow" to "[evoke] closure and reflection," which Joshua Mills of The Line of Best Fit described as "stirring and triumphant even in defeat." The song's bridge mentions memories and achievements repetitively, while its closing repeats previously mentioned phrases in attempt to create a sense of resolution. The song contains lyrics with romantic imagery. Sadie Sartini Gardner of Pitchfork observed that it "amplifies the sense of benevolent finality at the song's center." Mills noted that the song's emotional tone "blends heaviness and heavenliness as well as anyone since Bob Mould," while Robert Plummer of Louder Than War described its mood as "tender" and "romantic," as opposed to the majority of the album's more aggressive material.

=== Style ===
"Infinite Source" has been described as one of the more melodic and emotional tracks on Private Music. It demonstrates the style of shoegaze and post-punk, opening with a heavy, layered instrumental passage that establishes the track's dynamic arc. The introduction features dense guitar textures and resonant percussion, creating a sense of tension that gradually expands into a more atmospheric sound. Critics have observed that the production allows for the arrangement to change between heavier passages and more ethereal sections without oversaturation. Mills described the song as "a bittersweet number with sugar‑spun vocals and guitars alongside downbeat lyrics"; in a similar vein, Plummer observed that the song is "the closest the album comes to tenderness," making note of its "circling post‑punk guitar motif, lyrics of lovers embracing and hints of melodic pop." It was noted by Andrew Trendell of NME that the song contained "chugging Sleigh Bells riffery."

Mills compared the song's production to "Grimes‑like synths" and "Feeder at their best," noting that the song "brings Chino Moreno's vocals to the fore as he barks and coos, giving a sense of depth that so many of their erstwhile contemporaries would seldom bother with." Plummer described the guitar use as "circling" and "tender." Gardner noted that the track exemplifies Deftones' ability to "play heavy music softly," writing that its textures linger "a beat longer than seems natural, like it's trying to tear itself away from a Rothko." James Hickie of Kerrang! described the song as part of Carpenter's "re‑embracing the old school," arguing that its "rasping riffs recall the finest moments from the band's past... without ever sounding anything other than fresh."

== Reception ==
=== Critical ===
"Infinite Source" received widespread acclaim from critics, who praised the song for being melodic, emotional, and texturally heavy. Paul Weedon of Clash described the song as simailar to "shades of Godflesh's 'Xnoybis', with its chugging blasts of staccato harmonics on which Moreno's voice floats throughout," praising its industrial tension. Trendell praised the track's contrast between instances of force and instances of melody, positioning it as one of the album's most notable emotional moments. Plummer praised the song's "circling post‑punk guitar motif" that stands out against heavier material on Private Music. Stephen Hill of Metal Hammer praised its stylistic fusion, describing the track as "The Smashing Pumpkins‑meets‑New Order‑gone‑metal," and labelling it as one of the album's standout examples of Deftones' late‑career releases.

=== Commercial ===
In the United States, "Infinite Source" peaked at number 15 on the Billboard Hot Rock & Alternative Songs chart, number 2 on the Mainstream Rock chart, and number 2 on the Rock & Alternative Airplay chart. The song also peaked at number 3 on the Bubbling Under Hot 100 Singles chart, becoming Deftones' second highest peaking song on the chart—the first being "My Mind Is a Mountain", which had reached number 2 in August of that year. Internationally, the song debuted at its peak positions of number 9 on Recorded Music NZ's New Zealand Hot Singles chart and number 18 on Official Charts Company's UK Rock & Metal chart.

== Personnel ==
Credits adapted from the album's liner notes and Tidal Music.

=== Deftones ===
- Chino Moreno – vocals, guitar, lyricist, composer, producer
- Stephen Carpenter – guitar, composer, producer
- Frank Delgado – keyboards, composer, samples, producer
- Abe Cunningham – drums, composer, producer

=== Additional contributors ===
- Fred Sablan – bass, composer
- Nick Raskulinecz – producer, engineering, recording
- Rich Costey – mixing
- Howie Weinberg – mastering
- Will Borza – mastering
- Nathan Yarborough – engineering

== Charts ==
Weekly chart performance for "Infinite Source"
Chart (2025–2026)	Peak position
Canada Mainstream Rock (Billboard Canada)	16
Canada Modern Rock (Billboard Canada)	29
New Zealand Hot Singles (RMNZ)	9
New Zealand Airplay (Radioscope)	33
New Zealand Rock Airplay (Radioscope)	4
UK Rock & Metal (OCC)	18
US Bubbling Under Hot 100 (Billboard)	3
US Alternative Airplay (Billboard)	5
US Hot Rock & Alternative Songs (Billboard)	15
US Mainstream Rock (Billboard)	2
US Rock & Alternative Airplay (Billboard)	2
