= Milk of the Madonna =

Single by Deftones

from the album Private Music
- Released: August 7, 2025
- Recorded: 2024–2025
- Studio: California and Nashville
- Length: 4:09
- Label: Reprise; Warner
- Composers: Chino Moreno; Stephen Carpenter; Fred Sablan; Frank Delgado; Abe Cunningham
- Lyricist: Chino Moreno
- Producer: Nick Raskulinecz

Deftones singles chronology
"My Mind Is a Mountain" (2025)	"Milk of the Madonna" (2025)

Audio video
- "Milk of the Madonna" on YouTube

"Milk of the Madonna" (stylized in all lowercase) is a single by American alternative metal band Deftones, released on August 7, 2025, as the second single from their tenth studio album, Private Music.

== Background ==
The song was recorded during sessions for Private Music in California and Nashville, with producer Nick Raskulinecz, who previously worked with the band on Diamond Eyes and Koi No Yokan. It follows the lead single "My Mind Is a Mountain" and was released without prior announcement.

The title references spiritual and surrealist imagery. It has been interpreted as a metaphor for divine nourishment or spiritual fervor.

== Reception ==
Stereogum called it "a churning maelstrom about being lost in religious ecstasy".

== Music video ==
An official audio video was released on YouTube on August 7, 2025. As of December 2025, it has over one million views. A full music video has not been released.

== Personnel ==
- Chino Moreno – vocals, guitar
- Stephen Carpenter – guitar
- Fred Sablan – bass
- Abe Cunningham – drums
- Frank Delgado – keyboards, samples
- Nick Raskulinecz – production
- Rich Costey – mixing
- Will Borza and Howie Weinberg – mastering

== Charts ==
Chart performance for "Milk of the Madonna"
Chart (2025)	Peak position
New Zealand Hot Singles (RMNZ)	8
UK Rock & Metal (OCC)	38
US Hot Rock & Alternative Songs (Billboard)	23
