= Letter to Self =

Studio album by Sprints
- Released: 5 January 2024
- Recorded: March 2023
- Studios: Black Box Studios (Noyant-la-Gravoyère, France)
- Genres: Alternative rock; garage rock; post-punk
- Length: 39:00
- Label: City Slang
- Producer: Daniel Fox

Sprints chronology
A Modern Job (2022)	Letter to Self (2024)	All That Is Over (2025)

Letter to Self is the debut studio album by Irish band Sprints, released on 5 January 2024 through City Slang. The album was produced by Daniel Fox of fellow Irish group Gilla Band; upon release, it received acclaim from critics.

== Background and music ==
Letter to Self was recorded in 12 days with Daniel Fox at Black Box Studios, in the Loire Valley, France. Fox who had already produced previous singles and EPs of the band, was called back.

Singer, guitarist and lead-songwriter Karla Chubb stated that her lyrics were cathartic : "Lyrically it was about acknowledging everything that's happened in my life – my traumas, my struggles with anxiety – and to close that chapter by putting it on the page. There’s been a lot of shame in my life, so I wanted the title to be the most honest, on the nose thing possible."

== Release ==
The album was released on 5 January 2024 on vinyl in five different editions: Standard Black, Translucent Orange (Sprints Store exclusive), Marbled Orange and Red (Rough Trade exclusive), Dark Green (US Tour), Cream White, Clear, Translucent Yellow (Ireland Exclusive) and Cherry Red (Indies Exclusive).

It was also issued on CD - with seven bonus tracks - and through online platforms.

== Critical reception ==
Professional ratings
Aggregate scores
Source	Rating
AnyDecentMusic?	8.3/10
Metacritic	84/100
Review scores
Source	Rating
Clash	9/10
DIY	5/5 stars
Hot Press	9/10
The Irish Times	4/5 stars
The Line of Best Fit	8/10
Loud and Quiet	8/10
Mojo	4/5 stars
NME	5/5 stars
Pitchfork	7.1/10
Uncut	8/10

Letter to Self received a score of 84 out of 100 on review aggregator Metacritic based on 14 critics' reviews, indicating "universal acclaim". Uncut felt that "Sprints' debut delivers on thrilling live shows, with singer, guitarist and songwriter Karla Chubb providing a visceral fury, not least on the furious 'Adore Adore Adore', unheard since their label released Hole's Pretty on the Inside". Mojo stated that "from Ireland's proliferating alt-guitar pack, these intense runners could go the distance". Julia Mason of Clash wrote that "Sprints have produced an album brutally honest and personal. They have not been afraid to express the feeling of being an outsider, of looking for validation, of attempting to overcome self-doubt".

NME's Rishi Shah opined that "for all its heavy-hitting subject matter, the beauty in Letter to Self is the optimism it leaves you with, the noise well and truly drowning out the pain in an empowering fashion", calling it "a dynamic album that is reflective of the muddled world we find ourselves in". Ben Tipple of DIY described it as "musical exorcism at its very best, rallying against socially-imposed doubt and anxiety and – in its unique horror – finding welcome moments of inner peace". Reviewing the album for The Line of Best Fit, Joshua Mills summarised Letter to Self as a "punchy, indignant collection of raucous garage rock, packed with vitriol, self-reflection, and the occasional burst of light. They’re tunes of real heft and fantastic energy, performed with intensity and commitment by singer Karla Chubb". John Amen of Beats Per Minute concluded that Letters to Self is "a perilous yet fertile exploration of existential dissonance", with Sprints "striving for and often achieving an urgency and vision strikingly their own". Hot Press dubbed Letter To Self "one of the all-time great Irish debuts."

=== Year-end lists ===
Select year-end rankings for Letter to Self
Publication/critic	Accolade	Rank	Ref.
Rough Trade UK	Albums of the Year 2024	9	

== Track listing ==
Letter to Self vinyl track listing
No.	Title	Length
1.	"Ticking"	3:06
2.	"Heavy"	3:27
3.	"Cathedral"	2:59
4.	"Shaking Their Hands"	3:42
5.	"Adore Adore Adore"	2:37
6.	"Shadow of a Doubt"	4:10
7.	"Can't Get Enough of It"	4:19
8.	"Literary Mind"	4:32
9.	"A Wreck (A Mess)"	3:36
10.	"Up and Comer"	3:46
11.	"Letter to Self"	3:20
Total length:		39:00

CD bonus tracks
No.	Title	Length
12.	"Drones"
13.	"Help Me, I'm Spiralling"
14.	"Literary Mind (live)"
15.	"Ticking (demo)"
16.	"Heavy (demo)"
17.	"Can't Get Enough Of It (demo)"
18.	"Shadow Of A Doubt (demo)"

== Charts ==
Chart performance for Letter to Self
Chart (2024)	Peak position
Irish Albums (Official Charts)	11
Scottish Albums (Official Charts)	4
UK Albums (Official Charts)	20
UK Independent Albums (Official Charts)	2
