= Cartwheel (album) =

Studio album by Hotline TNT
- Released: November 3, 2023
- Studios: Winkler-verse (Kansas City); Aron's studio (Brooklyn); Pfizer building (Brooklyn); Camp X-Ray (Brooklyn)
- Genres: Shoegaze; indie rock; power pop
- Length: 33:01
- Label: Third Man

Hotline TNT chronology
Nineteen in Love (2021)	Cartwheel (2023)	Raspberry Moon (2025)

Cartwheel is the second album by American shoegaze project Hotline TNT, fronted by Will Anderson. It was released on November 3, 2023, through Third Man Records and received acclaim from critics.

== Themes and composition ==
The album's lyrics, according to Anderson, focus heavily on his interpersonal relationships. He noted that many were related to romantic relationships, but that others were about his parents, friends, and bandmates. Musically, the album has been described as shoegaze, indie rock, and power pop.

== Release and promotion ==
The album was released on November 3, 2023. Two single's were released in promotion of it; "Protocol" and "I Thought You'd Change". A North American, European and Japanese tour in support of the release is planned for 2024.

== Critical reception ==
Professional ratings
Aggregate scores
Source	Rating
AnyDecentMusic?	7.8/10
Metacritic	80/100
Review scores
Source	Rating
AllMusic	4/5 stars
Exclaim!	8/10
The Line of Best Fit	9/10
Mojo	3/5 stars
Paste	8.8/10
Pitchfork	8.4/10

Cartwheel received a score of 80 out of 100 on review aggregator Metacritic based on eight critics' reviews, indicating "generally favorable" reception. Editors at AnyDecentMusic? scored this release a 7.7 out of 10, based on six reviews. Pitchfork named it "Best New Music", with the site's reviewer Ian Cohen stating that while it "occasionally relents in tempo and density, it's extremely loud at all volumes, a force multiplier for the saddest secrets of its source material", additionally describing it as "towering shoegaze and supersized power-pop anthems". Mojo felt that "though Anderson buries his voice and words in the maelstrom, his declared (if not immediately apparent) theme of a constantly thwarted search for 'true love' seems right at home in shoegazing's characteristic marriage of bliss and anxiety".

Craig Howieson of The Line of Best Fit summarized the album as "12 songs that are soft around the edges and wash over the listener in shades of sunset orange and pink, guitars morph and collapse in on themselves like the contents on a lava lamp". Paste's Andy Steiner wrote that it "takes all the texture of Nineteen's DIY-budget distortion and softens it without losing any of that growl or edge", calling it "a remarkable act of balance" as well as "not just a triumph for Anderson and Hotline TNT, but for shoegaze itself". Ian Gormely of Exclaim! stated that the tracks "carry many shoegaze and dream pop hallmarks—swirling soundscapes, bendy-guitars—which lends a vibe-dependent aesthetic that keeps the record in line with many of its contemporaries".

Concluding a review for AllMusic, Matt Collar described the album as, "Cartwheel's sampler pack of destroyed guitar tones, powerful songwriting, and wafts of nostalgia for multiple eras of slowcore and shoegaze all contribute to its high replay value and overall captivating sound. The album reshuffles a deck of familiar reference points, but it still deals a hand that's engaging and holds a bothered beauty of its own."

Writing for Pitchfork, Ian Cohen commented that "No matter how far into the red Cartwheel pushes, there's one sound that stands out: Anderson's humble, everydude voice, somehow rising above the clouds of dirt and grime even at a mumble."

=== Accolades ===
Publications' year-end list appearances for Cartwheel
Critic/Publication	List	Rank	Ref
Consequence of Sound	Top 50 Albums of 2023	38	
Paste	Top 50 Albums of 2023	42	
Stereogum	Top 50 Albums of 2023	8	
Treble	Top 50 Albums of 2023	6	
Under the Radar	Top 100 Albums of 2023	55	
Uproxx	Top Albums of 2023	NA	

== Track listing ==
All tracks are written by William Anderson; keyboards on "Protocol" written by Ian Teeple.

Cartwheel track listing
No.	Title	Length
1.	"Protocol"	4:12
2.	"I Thought You'd Change"	2:51
3.	"Beauty Filter"	2:07
4.	"History Channel"	2:43
5.	"I Know You"	2:43
6.	"Son in Law"	2:40
7.	"Out of Town"	2:15
8.	"Maxine"	1:51
9.	"That Was My Life"	2:11
10.	"Spot Me 100"	3:06
11.	"BMX"	3:41
12.	"Stump"	2:42
Total length:		33:01

== Personnel ==
Credits adapted from the album's liner notes.

- William Anderson (Note: Anderson is credited under his real name, Flip, Slim, Will, Click, DJ Big Poison, and Sandy Graphics.) – vocals, guitars, bass, drums, electronics, keyboards (all tracks); engineering (track 9), album art, design, layout
- Alex Farrar – mixing
- Warren Defever – mastering
- Ian Teeple – engineering (1, 4–6, 10, 12), background vocals (7)
- Aron Kobayashi Ritch – engineering (2, 3, 8, 11)
- Drew Auscherman – engineering, drums (7)
- Allegra Weingarten – background vocals (7)
- August Beetschen – "TNT" logo
- Andrea Lukic – Kaxtyn drawing
- Tyler Macmillan – original Kaxtyn character design
- Steve Levy – live photo
