= Nineteen in Love =

Studio album by Hotline TNT
- Released: September 30, 2021
- Genre: Shoegaze, power pop

Hotline TNT chronology
Nineteen in Love (2021)	Cartwheel (2023)

Singles from Nineteen in Love

Nineteen in Love is the debut studio album by American rock band Hotline TNT. It was released on September 30, 2021.

== Background and recording ==
After performing in a number of indie rock bands throughout the 2010s, Will Anderson decided to form his own band, Hotline TNT in 2018. Anderson self-recording and self-releasing a number of EPs across 2018, and 2019, then plan was to turn to focus on touring. However, COVID-19 pandemic eliminated any opportunities to tour in 2020, so Anderson refocused on new music. He spent much of the following year recording the album. He recorded all parts of the album himself. The album was recorded on a MacBook Air with GarageBand, without the use of any guitar amps or physical drum kits. A layered, guitar-driven sound was emphasized, with any songs, such as "Let U See Me", featuring extensive guitar overdubbing. Anderson noted that four to five guitar parts are layered into each song. All drumming was programmed by Anderson and played through a drum machine. Paste describe it as rougher, darker, and grittier than subsequent Hotline TNT albums. "Stampede" was described as "blown out and sand-papery" song that "might register as more slowcore than shoegaze." The song "4-HT" features auto-tuned vocals.

== Themes and composition ==
The album's lyrics were influenced by the divorce of Anderson's parents, and explore his doubts on whether or not a romantic relationships can last forever. Lost love and relationship struggles are recurring themes as well. Anderson noted that the album was written over the course of a year while he was largely stuck alone in his apartment due to COVID lockdowns; much of the album's lyrics explore his feelings about a specific relationship he was in, and how they were forced to be on separate continents away from each other at the time.

This album is centered on love and relationships (that) didn't work out. It leans heavily on nostalgia and reflecting on a particular relationship I knew wouldn’t work out, but we had to try anyway. Even though it didn't work, I’m glad it happened and wouldn't change anything.

While much of the lyrical content is self-referential, the album title, Nineteen in Love, is not specifically in reference to Anderson at 19 years old, but rather, a general allusion to how teenagers generally feel about love, when its "really intense and dramatic". The original version of the album only released on YouTube contained a short skit in the middle of the album, that instructs the listener that there would be a brief break while they flip to the other side of vinyl record, as if the music was playing on a record player. The skit was performed by Anderson's uncle, and was a direct allusion Tom Petty doing a similar skit on his Into the Great Wide Open album.

== Release and reception ==
Outside of physical copies of the album, the album's original 2021 digital release was restricted entirely to YouTube, as one long video playing the album from start to finish. The release method was a response Anderson's objections to the economic model of music streaming websites for musicians, and even contained the quote "Cancel your Spotify subscription" in its video's description. He later reflected that, while the approach hurt general visibility for the band, as listeners could not share or discover songs through playlists on streaming platforms, it did help develop a more dedicated fanbase that listened to entire album front to back, noting that "making it harder for people to hear was a little gatekeep-y, [but] no one was coming to Hotline TNT shows by accident". The song "Stampede" appeared on the COVID pandemic relief compilation album The Song is Coming from Inside the House; it being one of the few ways to listen to an individual track helped it act as a single and helped create more exposure for the band and promote the album as well. The album was eventually released on streaming platforms, with the ability to release to individual songs.

The album was well received critically. Anderson toured heavily in support of the album in the years following its release, including touring with Snail Mail and Momma. He assembled different touring bands for each tour, each iteration containing three guitarists to help recreate the album's guitar-heavy sound in a live setting. Heavy North American touring in support of the album would lead to record label interest from Jack White's Third Man Records, which the band would sign to and release subsequent albums Cartwheel (2023) and Raspberry Moon (2025).

== Track list ==
No.	Title	Length
1.	"Had 2 Try"
2.	"Stampede"
3.	"Leave of Absence"
4.	"4 H-T"
5.	"I Know What U Mean"
6.	"Wire Transfer"
7.	"Slider"
8.	"Floor Tom"
9.	"Nightlighter"
10.	"Let U See Me"
11.	"October"

== Personnel ==
Band

- Will Anderson - vocals, guitars, bass, drum machine

Production

- Engineered by DJ Big Poison - audio engineering
- Mixed by Melina Duterte - audio mixing
- Mastered by Dylan Wall - audio mastering
- Ben C Trogdon - album cover art
