= All That Is Over =

Studio album by Sprints
- Released: 26 September 2025
- Studio: La Frette (Paris)
- Length: 38:29
- Labels: City Slang; Sub Pop
- Producer: Daniel Fox

Sprints chronology
Letter to Self (2024)	All That Is Over (2025)

Singles from All That Is Over
- 1. "Descartes" Released: 24 June 2025

All That Is Over is the second studio album by Irish garage punk band Sprints. It was released on 26 September 2025 via City Slang, and via Sub Pop in LP, CD and digital formats. It features the single "Descartes" and received favorable ratings from multiple publications.

== Background ==
The album was preceded by the band's debut studio album, Letter to Self (2024). "Descartes" was released as the lead single on 24 June 2025, alongside a music video directed by Niamh Bryson. Frontwoman Karla Chubb stated about the single, "Descartes explores the idea of needing to write and create as a means of survival, not just a means of expression, and how important that is to me as a person to try to understand and process the world around me."

== Reception ==
Professional ratings
Review scores
Source	Rating
Clash	7/10
DIY	5/5 stars
Dork	5/5 stars
God Is in the TV	9/10
Hot Press	8.5/10
The Independent	4/5 stars
Kerrang	5/5
Louder	4.5/5 stars
Rolling Stone	3.5/5 stars
The Skinny	4/5 stars

The album received generally positive ratings from multiple publications.

Caroline Kelly of Hot Press stated, "By turns startling and seismic, All That Is Over continues the band's knack of crafting snarling, explosive bangers, cementing Sprints' status as one of the most compelling acts in rock," giving it a 8.5 rating. In a 4.5-star rating for Louder, Vicky Greer described it as "rife with tension, particularly on 'Something's Gonna Happen', the calm before the storm, where the band seem to address the listener directly."

Hester Aalberts of Oor compared the album to its predecessor, noting that "in terms of unsharpened explosiveness Letter to Self wins, but All That Is Over is more accessible and layered." Rolling Stone Germany's Jörn Schlüter observed, it "reflects the contradictory experience of experiencing the steep rise of one's own band, but at the same time having to watch everything sink into chaos." Amelie Grice, writing for Clash, opined, it "distorts what is expected with a dynamic and ominous punk release. After laying significant groundwork with their first album Letter to Self, Sprints continue to be a vessel for clever driven punk music."

In a DIY review, Ben Tipple commented, "The anger remains palpable, the lyrics ever relatable, and All That Is Over injects enough ingenuity to keep Sprints right at the top of the class," giving it a score of five stars. Dork's Felicity Newton referred to the album as "the sound of a group with something urgent to say, and the chops to say it louder, weirder and smarter than anyone else." Mark Sutherland of Kerrang! called it "a truly thrilling record on the most basic level; boasting a set of classy songs that are half-brains, half-brawn and all-absolute-bangers."

Steven Doherty gave the album a rating of nine for God Is in the TV and noted, "Nothing rushed or thrown-together here, no tour fatigue, just an ever more confident band knocking out a second glorious album in the space of a year. Quite the achievement." Marcy Donelson, reviewing for AllMusic, noted it as "a representative mix of personal and political atrocities, All That Is Over is far from a grim headbanger, rather offering a cathartic, frustrated call to action that seems timely as ever in its blunt demands for care and safe spaces in a world on fire." Billie Estrine in their review for the Skinny, remarked, "Sonically, All That Is Over creates a spooky and diverse soundscape, while embodying themes of atrocity that backlight its conceptualization." Adam White of the Independent stated, "Many of these songs tussle with the jubilant status of the band – newly anointed off the back of their promising debut Letter to Self – against the apocalyptic landscape of the modern age."

The song "Something's Gonna Happen" is used in the 2026 Danny Boyle film Ink.

== Track listing ==
All tracks are written by Sprints.

All That Is Over track listing
No.	Title	Length
1.	"Abandon"	2:40
2.	"To the Bone"	3:29
3.	"Descartes"	3:13
4.	"Need"	2:40
5.	"Beg"	3:16
6.	"Rage"	2:43
7.	"Something's Gonna Happen"	4:21
8.	"Pieces"	3:11
9.	"Better"	3:09
10.	"Coming Alive"	3:35
11.	"Desire"	6:12
Total length:		38:29

== Personnel ==
Credits adapted from the album's liner notes.

=== Sprints ===
- Karla Chubb – lead vocals, rhythm guitar
- Zac Stephenson – lead guitar, backing vocals
- Sam McCann – bass, backing vocals
- Jack Callan – drums

=== Technical ===
- Daniel Fox – production, engineering, mixing
- Thibault Moucron – engineering assistance
- Sarah Register – mastering

== Charts ==
Chart performance for All That Is Over
Chart (2025)	Peak position
French Rock & Metal Albums (SNEP)	33
Irish Albums (Official Charts)	27
Irish Independent Albums (IRMA)	3
Scottish Albums (Official Charts)	12
UK Albums (Official Charts)	50
UK Independent Albums (Official Charts)	2
