= Hotline TNT =

American indie rock band

- Origin: New York City, New York, U.S.
- Genres: Shoegaze; alternative rock; noise pop
- Years active: 2018–present
- Label: Third Man
- Members: Will Anderson; Lucky Hunter; Haylen Trammel; Mike Ralston

Hotline TNT is an American rock band from New York City, New York. The band is fronted by singer and guitarist Will Anderson, who writes and records all of their music and performs live with a rotating lineup of musicians. Their style is characterized by Anderson's wall-of-sound layering of distorted guitars and is often described as shoegaze. Hotline TNT have released three full-length albums, Nineteen in Love (2021), Cartwheel (2023) and Raspberry Moon (2025).

== History ==
=== Formation and Nineteen in Love (2018–2021) ===
Prior to the formation of Hotline TNT, Will Anderson was previously a member of a number of small indie rock bands, such as Happy Diving and Crazy Bugs. He most notably moved on to the Vancouver-based indie rock band "Weed", with whom he released three studio albums between 2011 and 2017. Upon spending most of his twenties in local rock bands, he began to feel burned out, wondering if he should quit and focus on other aspects of his life. Additionally, his parents divorce and his pursuit of his Master's Degree in education took away from his focus on music. However, every time he began to seriously consider the change, he still found himself tinkering around with guitar riffs in his free time, unable to step away from music. In 2018, he decided to form a new musical group, Hotline TNT. He established Hotline TNT as a band; he would be the sole constant member, while working with a rotating collection of other band members. Anderson refuses to disclose the meaning of the band's name; he states that he and the original band members he worked with made a vow not to publicly disclose it.

A series of EPs were recorded and released by Anderson between 2018 and 2019: Cool If I Crash, Fireman's Carry, and Go Around Me. Moving into 2020, Anderson had secured a tour as the opener for indie musician Snail Mail, but the breakout of the COVID-19 pandemic cancelled the plans. Instead, Anderson would work on recording a song called "Stampede" for a local COVID charity compilation release, and with all of the downtime that came with the pandemic, proceeded to record the band's debut studio album, Nineteen in Love. The album was recorded entirely in GarageBand, without using any guitar amps or drum sets. The album was released in late 2021; initially exclusively on YouTube as one long video, where individual tracks could not be chosen. This was done both as a statement on how music streaming services were hurting the industry, and as a way to force listeners to play the entire album rather than just single songs. Anderson conceded it led to mixed results; it helped create a dedicated fanbase, but generally did not help with finding new listeners, and was eventually made more widely available. The band toured extensively in support of the album the following year, alongside self-releasing another EP, When You Find Out.

=== Cartwheel (2022–2024) ===
While touring in 2022 with Island of Love, the band became in contact with reps with their record label, Jack White's Third Man Records, who expressed interest. Upon the conclusion of the tour, and another one with Snail Mail, the band started getting approached by other record labels as well. Anderson was initially apprehensive to signing to a record label; he was used to more of a do it yourself work ethic, and was sensitive to accusations of "selling out" that often come with it. However, he was eventually persuaded, largely upon learning that Sheer Mag, a band he was both friends with and respected musically, was also signing with Third Man. Anderson met with the label, who responded favorably to the demos he was working on. Upon learning that they would also offer him the most creative freedom in his music, and a path that would allow him to focus his efforts entirely towards his music, he eventually signed to the label.

Prior to signing the label, Anderson had already completed some amount of work on a second studio album. Some songs, such as "Protocol" and "History Channel", were complete enough to enter regular rotation on the band's live setlists. Others were written entirely in the studio. Leading up to their second album, the band released another EP in April 2023, Spring Disco, which included a song left off the second album, "If We Keep Hanging Out". In November 2023, the band released their second full-length album Cartwheel. Cartwheel was named "Best of the Week" from Paste magazine, and also received "Best New Music" distinction from Pitchfork. The band plans on spending much of 2024 touring in support of Cartwheel, including shows in North America, Europe, and Japan. Anderson states that he has also already started early work on a third studio album, which will be the first to feature a live drummer rather than a drum machine. He aims to record it in between the band's busy touring schedule.

In July 2024, the band released a remix EP titled Somersault. The five song release featured electronic-leaning remixes from five separate artists - They Are Gutting a Body of Water, DJ Sabrina the Teenage DJ, Poisonfrog, Downstairs J, and Car Culture. In November 2024, the band released an expanded version of their compilation album Trilogy, which collected many of the songs off of their earlier EP releases, bundled with 2 previously unreleased songs from the era.

=== Raspberry Moon (2025-present) ===
In April 2025, the band announced the name of their third studio album, Raspberry Moon, and its release date, June 20, 2025. It was preceded by two singles, "Julia's War" and "Candle".

In August 2025, the band removed their catalog from Spotify.

== Musical style and influences ==
Hotline TNT's music has commonly been described as shoegaze, alternative rock and noise pop. Much of the band's music involves a dense wall of sound of distorted guitar. Anderson records and layers the guitar himself in the studio, and then recreates the sound live with a three guitar approach done by himself and two touring guitarists. Anderson writes all the lyrics, which generally are themed about interpersonal relationships of his, both romantic and platonic. He commonly drops names in songs, something he believes helps to make a song more memorable and relatable, though he concedes he generally changes names to protect the anonymity of the song's subjects.

Despite commonly being labeled as shoegaze by critics, Anderson noted that many music fans dispute whether the band falls into the genre, something he feels indifferent about. Anderson said of the shoegaze label:

I think 'shoegaze' is now kind of similar to what the word 'indie' became like 10, 20 years ago. It doesn’t describe a genre anymore. It’s more of a large umbrella for guitar-based music, or music with distorted guitars. Sometimes they’re kind of bendy or going in and out of tune a little bit. Sometimes the vocals have a little more reverb, but that doesn’t describe Hotline necessarily...It’s just the way language works and trends work. To go back to the beginning, I had a pretty typical journey myself of hearing Loveless by My Bloody Valentine when I was in 10th grade. It had a pretty big effect on me, as it did with many other people. A couple of years after that, I started making my own music and that was one of the big influences on it."

Contrary to many shoegaze and guitar-based bands, Anderson places little emphasis on his guitar set up and gear. He describes the band as "anti-gear" - they don't use guitar pedals, and place no emphasis on what guitar amps are used.

== Band members ==
Current

- Will Anderson – vocals, guitar (2018–present)
- Lucky Hunter - guitar (2024–present)
- Haylen Trammel - bass (2024–present)
- Mike Ralston – drums (2023–present)

Former

- Sarah Ellington - bass (2023)
- Maria Sepulveda - guitar (2023)
- Jack Kraus - guitar (2023)
- Austin Noll - guitar (2021)
- Matt Berry – guitar (2024)
- August Beetschen – guitar (2023–2024)
- Olivia Garner – guitar, bass (2023–2024)

== Discography ==
Albums

- Nineteen in Love (2021)
- Cartwheel (2023)
- Raspberry Moon (2025)

EPs

- Cool If I Crash (2018)
- Fireman's Carry (2019)
- Go Around Me (2019)
- When You Find Out (2022)
- Spring Disco (2023)

Remixes

- Somersault (2024)
