= Sprints (band) =

Irish garage punk band (formed 2019)

SPRINTS
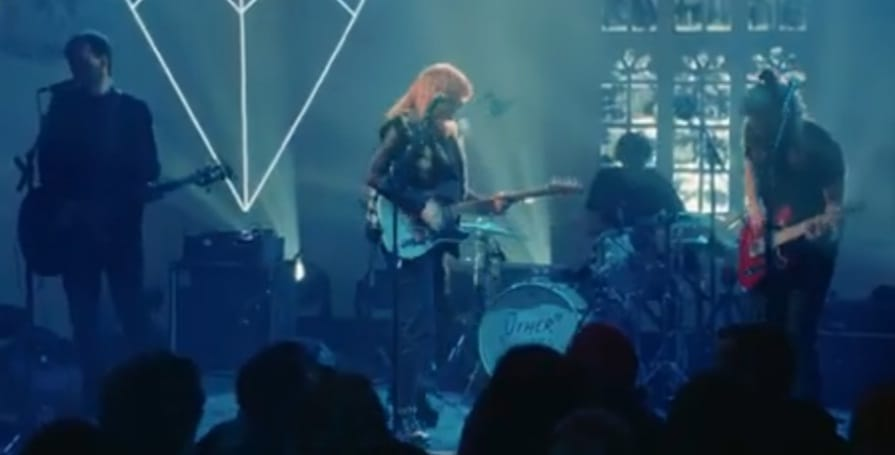
- The band in 2022, left to right: Sam McCann, Karla Chubb, Jack Callan, and Colm O’Raghallaigh

Background information
- Origin: Dublin, Ireland
- Genres: Post-punk; garage punk
- Years active: 2019–present
- Labels: Nice Swan; City Slang; Sub Pop
- Members: Karla Chubb; Sam McCann; Jack Callan; Zac Stephenson
- Past members: Colm O’Reilly
- Website: sprintsmusic.com

Sprints (stylised in all caps as SPRINTS) are an Irish garage punk band, formed in Dublin in 2019. The band currently consists of Karla Chubb (vocals, guitar), Sam McCann (bass, vocals), Jack Callan (drums) and Zac Stephenson (guitar).

Between 2019 and 2022, the band recorded and released a series of singles and EPs for the Nice Swan label, before signing to City Slang. Their debut album, Letter to Self, was released in January 2024 to widespread critical acclaim. Following the album's release, founding guitarist Colm O’Reilly departed from the band in May 2024, citing "a desire to retreat from public performance."

Following O’Reilly's departure, Sprints were initially joined by a succession of guest guitarists during their summer 2024 tour, before Zac Stephenson permanently joined the band's line-up. The newly solidified four-piece recorded and released, "Feast", a stand-alone single exploring "gluttony, consumption and desire." The band's second studio album, All That Is Over, was released on 26 September 2025.

== Biography ==
Singer, guitarist and lead-songwriter Karla Chubb was born in Dublin and spent her early childhood in Düsseldorf, Germany before moving back to Ireland. Chubb, guitarist Colm O’Reilly and drummer Jack Callan are childhood friends. They have been playing music together since the age of 10. They then recruited bassist Sam McCann, who also sings on records and on stage. Frontwoman Chubb was inspired by the energy of punk rock. She mentioned the likes of Patti Smith, Siouxsie and the Banshees and PJ Harvey as vital forces. The band started to be professional in 2019, their first single "Pathetic" was intended to be a "straightforward song". They wanted to write songs that were "relatable [...] honest and raw and kind of just our take on life".

Their second single "The Cheek" followed in September 2019: it was reviewed as "catchy with a manic ferocious chorus". Another single "Kissing Practice" was released in February 2020, Daniel Fox from Gilla Band was instrumental as producer for "embedding certain textures and layers". Chubb then described their music as a "melding of genres, from grunge to punk to garage. Anything we write is very rooted in a real story." They released in 2021 the EP Manifesto which was inspired by the campaign for Repeal The 8th in their country, and women's ongoing fight for bodily autonomy. The band toured extensively in 2023: Clash praised their "electrifying live show".

In March 2022, Sprints released A Modern Job (EP) featuring singles "How Does the Story Go?" and "Little Fix."

Their debut album Letter to Self was released on 5 January 2024, it received acclaim from critics. The band toured Europe, the US and the UK from February through May. The band was scheduled to play at the 2024 South by Southwest festival in Austin, Texas, but pulled out citing the festival's financial ties with the US Army and RTX Corporation. After selling out their British tour five months in advance, they announced three UK dates for November 2024, with shows in Bristol's Marble Factory, London's Kentish Town Forum, and Manchester's New Century Hall.

Guitarist Colm O'Reilly departed from the band in May 2024. Following O’Reilly's departure, the band were initially joined by a succession of guest guitarists during their summer 2024 tour, before Zac Stephenson permanently joined the band's core line-up. The newly solidified four-piece recorded and released, "Feast", a stand-alone single exploring "gluttony, consumption and desire."

Lead singer Karla Chubb featured on a single with Mount Palomar, "L'Aliment", which was released 31 March 2025.

Playing at The Grand Social in Dublin on the 29 March 2025, the band announced that they had written and recorded a new album entitled All That is Over, which they debuted in full. The first single from All That Is Over, "Descartes" was released on the 24 June 2025, later followed by dual singles "Rage" and "Beg" on the 24 July 2025, with the final single, "Better", releasing on the 3 September 2025. All That Is Over released on 26 September 2025 to critical acclaim.

== Style ==
They have been described as punk-pop quartet but the music is "raw" and "ferocious". They are a guitar band. NME said that they married "intricate alt-rock with fierce bursts of noise-punk and grunge". Journalist Ed Power wrote that "Sprints songs are breathless pile-drivers, powered by Chubb’s ear for cut-glass melody and by their producer Daniel Fox’s ability to make intimate music feel huge". Listening to their music "feels like tiptoeing into a stranger’s room and reading their intimate diary entries".

== Members ==
Current members

- Karla Chubb – lead vocals, rhythm guitar (2019–present)
- Sam McCann – bass, backing vocals (2019–present)
- Jack Callan – drums (2019–present)
- Zac Stephenson – lead guitar, backing vocals (2024–present)

Former members

- Colm O’Reilly – lead guitar (2019–2024)

== Discography ==
=== Studio albums ===
List of albums, with selected chart positions
Title	Album details	Peak chart positions	
Title	Album details	IRE	UK
Letter to Self	Released: 5 January 2024; Label: City Slang	11	20
All That Is Over	Released: 26 September 2025; Label: City Slang	27	50

=== Live albums ===
List of live albums, with selected details
Title	Details
Live At The Grand Social	Released: 27 Apr 2021; Label: Sprints
Live in Dublin	Released: 19 Nov 2024; Label: City Slang

=== Compilations ===
List of compilations, with selected details
Title	Details
The Back Catalogue	Released: 2022; Label: Nice Swan Recordings

=== Extended plays ===
List of EPs, with selected details
Title	Details
Manifesto	Released: 26 March 2021; Label: Nice Swan Recordings
A Modern Job	Released: 11 March 2022; Label: Nice Swan Recordings
