= The Sky, the Earth & All Between =

Studio album by Architects
- Released: 28 February 2025
- Recorded: 2023–2024
- Studios: Real World (Box, Wiltshire); Angelic (Brackley, Northamptonshire); Middle Farm (Newton Abbot, Devon)
- Genres: Metalcore; alternative metal
- Length: 41:50
- Label: Epitaph
- Producer: Jordan Fish

Architects studio album chronology
The Classic Symptoms of a Broken Spirit (2022)	The Sky, the Earth & All Between (2025)

Singles from The Sky, the Earth & All Between
- 1. "Seeing Red" Released: 4 December 2023; 2. "Curse" Released: 9 April 2024; 3. "Whiplash" Released: 19 November 2024; 4. "Blackhole" Released: 14 January 2025; 5. "Everything Ends" Released: 24 February 2025; 6. "Brain Dead" Released: 26 February 2025; 7. "Broken Mirror" Released: 21 January 2026

The Sky, the Earth & All Between is the eleventh studio album by English metalcore band Architects. Produced by former Bring Me the Horizon keyboardist Jordan Fish, the album was released on 28 February 2025 via Epitaph Records.

The album follows up on the band's previous studio album, The Classic Symptoms of a Broken Spirit (2022), and is the first without lead guitarist Josh Middleton since All Our Gods Have Abandoned Us (2016), who amicably departed the band in 2023 due to creative differences. The album's title is lifted from a lyric on the opening track "Elegy".

== Background ==
On 4 December 2023, the band surprise released the album's lead single "Seeing Red", announcing a North American headline tour at the same time with support from Of Mice & Men and While She Sleeps that would take place during May 2024. On 9 April, the band released "Curse" as the album's second single, as they promoted and played the two singles live on tour dates supporting Metallica and on their headlining tourleg of North America the following month. It was also revealed that "Curse" was produced by former Bring Me the Horizon member Jordan Fish who they were previously pictured being in the studio with, hinting at the band's upcoming album.

On 19 November 2024, the band officially revealed The Sky, the Earth & All Between as their eleventh studio album scheduled for 28 February 2025. Alongside the announcement, they released the album's third single "Whiplash" with a music video. On 14 January 2025, the fourth single "Blackhole" was released which was accompanied by a cinematic music video. In the week preceding the release, the band released two singles 48 hours apart from each other, "Everything Ends" on 24 February, and "Brain Dead" featuring House of Protection on 26 February.

== Composition ==
The album has been sonically described as metalcore, and alternative metal.

== Critical reception ==
Professional ratings
Aggregate scores
Source	Rating
AnyDecentMusic?	6.3/10
Review scores
Source	Rating
AllMusic	3.5/5 stars
The Arts Desk	4/5 stars
Blabbermouth.net	9/10
Clash	8/10
Distorted Sound	8/10
God Is in the TV	4/10
Kerrang!	4/5
Louder Sound	4/5 stars
Sputnikmusic	2.8/5
Wall of Sound	8.5/10

Upon release, The Sky, the Earth & All Between received generally positive reviews.

Speaking for The Arts Desk, Tom Carr gave the album high praise, commenting: "The result is an album of their essence condensed and distilled into an impactful, attesting concoction of modern metal." He also specifically highlighted tracks such as "Elegy", "Judgement Day" and "Chandelier" as the best tracks on the record. Anne Erickson of Blabbermouth.net singled out priase for lead vocalist Sam Carter's versatile vocals and the overall instrumental performance by the rest of the band, "Listening to The Sky, The Earth & All Between from front to back, what really stands out is not only Carter's diverse vocals, but also the band's pristine instrumentation." Tom Morgan of Clash stated; "As a whole, ‘The Sky, The Earth & All Between’ soars. It’s one of Architects’ most laser-focused albums; from the fast, fun heaviness to the succinct runtimes to the lyrical content that hones in on lucid, pared-down imagery rather than grand, sweeping statements. It’s among the veteran band’s most sharply-realised efforts for the simple fact that it (mostly) prioritises what they do best: making whiplash-inducing modern metal." In a four star review by Kerrang!, James Hickie likened songs like "Blackhole" and "Evil Eyes" to The Prodigy and Deftones respectively. While Merlin Alderslade of Louder Sound compared the album to the band's previous two efforts For Those That Wish to Exist (2021) and The Classic Symptoms of a Broken Spirit (2022), he also described it as a "whole different animal." He also highlighted Carter's vocal performance as one of the best things about the release: "They’ve channelled their current influences into something diverse, impactful and engaging, driven by a particularly vibrant performance from Sam, unquestionably the album’s MVP."

== Commercial performance ==
The Sky, the Earth & All Between charted in the Top 10 in several countries worldwide, including Australia, Germany and their native United Kingdom.

In their home country, the album debuted at number two on the UK Albums Chart with 15,619 album equivalent units, only beaten to the top spot by Sabrina Carpenter's Short n' Sweet. However, it became the band's second top ten album and their biggest ever first week sales in the UK, topping the UK Albums Downloads Chart and the UK Rock & Metal Albums Chart.

== Track listing ==
All lyrics are written by Dan Searle; all music is composed by Sam Carter, Dan Searle & Jordan Fish, except when noted.

The Sky, the Earth & All Between track listing
No.	Title	Music	Length
1.	"Elegy"		3:35
2.	"Whiplash"		3:46
3.	"Blackhole"		3:20
4.	"Everything Ends"		3:40
5.	"Brain Dead" (featuring House of Protection)	Carter; Searle; Fish; Stephen Harrison; Aric Improta	2:48
6.	"Evil Eyes"		3:51
7.	"Landmines"		3:34
8.	"Judgement Day" (featuring Amira Elfeky)	Carter; Searle; Fish; Amira Elfeky	3:14
9.	"Broken Mirror"		3:10
10.	"Curse"		3:01
11.	"Seeing Red"	Carter; Searle	3:40
12.	"Chandelier"		4:06
Total length:			41:50

== Personnel ==
Credits adapted from album's liner notes.

Architects

- Sam Carter – lead vocals, composition
- Adam Christianson – guitars
- Alex "Ali" Dean – bass, keyboards, drum pad
- Dan Searle – drums, percussion, programming, composition, lyrics, production (11)

Additional musicians

- Amira Elfeky – vocals, composition (8)
- Stephen Harrison (House of Protection) – vocals, composition (5)
- Aric Improta (House of Protection) – vocals, composition (5)
- Choir Noir – vocals (11)

Additional personnel

- Zakk Cervini – mastering, mixer (MDDN Studios, Los Angeles, California, US)
- Jordan Fish – composition, production (all except 11)
- Julian Gargiulo – mixing assistant, engineering assistant
- Mick Gordon – additional production (11)
- Chris Clancy – engineering
- Adam "Nolly" Getgood – engineering
- Frank Maddocks – creative direction, design
- Ed Mason – photography
- Pete Miles – engineering

== Charts ==
Chart performance for The Sky, the Earth & All Between
Chart (2025)	Peak position
Australian Albums (ARIA)	8
Austrian Albums (Ö3 Austria)	5
Belgian Albums (Ultratop Flanders)	24
Belgian Albums (Ultratop Wallonia)	17
Dutch Albums (Album Top 100)	33
Finnish Albums (Suomen virallinen lista)	30
French Albums (SNEP)	79
French Rock & Metal Albums (SNEP)	6
German Albums (Offizielle Top 100)	3
German Rock & Metal Albums (Offizielle Top 100)	2
New Zealand Albums (RMNZ)	40
Scottish Albums (Official Charts)	7
Spanish Albums (Promusicae)	71
Swedish Hard Rock Albums (Sverigetopplistan)	8
Swiss Albums (Schweizer Hitparade)	9
UK Albums (Official Charts)	2
UK Independent Albums (Official Charts)	2
UK Rock & Metal Albums (Official Charts)	1
US Billboard 200	152
US Independent Albums (Billboard)	21
US Top Rock & Alternative Albums (Billboard)	29
