= Raspberry Moon =

Studio album by Hotline TNT
- Released: June 20, 2025
- Recorded: 2024–2025
- Studio: Fresh Poison Apple (Ridgewood); Camp Van Vac Cabin #15 (Ely)
- Genre: Shoegaze, alternative rock, power pop
- Length: 35:26
- Label: Third Man
- Producer: Amos Pitsch

Hotline TNT chronology
Cartwheel (2023)	Raspberry Moon (2025)

Singles from Raspberry Moon
- 1. "Julia's War" Released: April 9, 2025; 2. "Candle" Released: April 30, 2025

Raspberry Moon is the third studio album by American alternative rock band Hotline TNT. It was released on June 20, 2025. After frontman Will Anderson writing and recording previous albums Nineteen in Love (2021) and Cartwheel (2023) entirely on his own, Raspberry Moon marks their first as a full band. The album was generally well received by critics.

== Background and recording ==
After releasing their second studio album, Cartwheel, in November 2023, the following month, frontman Will Anderson, announced he already had six songs in development for a future third studio album. Anderson noted he wished to record it in between touring plans across 2024, and that contrary to the first two albums, where he recorded all parts himself, he wanted to explore recording with his touring band for the third album. He specifically aimed to record it with a live drummer and recording the first two albums with a drum machine due to not previously have a permanent drummer in the band. Anderson reportedly went back and forth on the approach, also considering recording one more album entirely by himself, but eventually landed on recording the album as a quartet; himself on vocals and guitar, Lucky Hunter on guitar, Haylen Trammel on bass, and Mike Ralston on drums.

Anderson recorded with music producer Amos Pitsch for the first time in the recording sessions. Initial recording plans included Anderson recording alone with Pitsch; however, Hunter, Trammel and Ralston appeared at the studio unplanned, and Anderson allowed them to participate. Initial recording sessions were difficult; Anderson struggled to get the band to recreate the intended sound from pre-recorded demos. He stepped away from the group for a few hours and privately wrote a new song - "The Scene" - which helped get the band on the same page on moving forward with recording the album. Concurrently, the rest of the band had worked together to write the beginnings of the song "Break Right", and upon Anderson adding lyrics, became their first collaboratively written song as a band.

== Themes and composition ==
Lyrically, the album shies away from the themes of heartbreak found in Cartwheel, in favor of more positive views on romance and passion. While some songs, such as "Lawnmower", still touch on the topic of heartbreak, the album marks a departure from previous album Nineteen in Love, which explored the doubt on whether or not true love or long-term relationships were even possible, themes Anderson refused to return to in the album:

This is definitely my most openly romantic album. It's a product of the happiest relationship I’ve had so far in my life...I'm not special in having a long career of getting rejected and heartbroken. But the advice I give to my friends when they’re heartbroken is 'yeah, you are heartbroken right now, but keep your eyes on the ball because there’s something good coming around the bend.' I had to keep that hope alive in myself, both with the band and my relationships...playing it safe and not taking risks is not a recipe for security or happiness...I see the Reddit comments, I see the YouTube comments. People are saying ‘Hotline's great, but I really wish it would go back to the early stuff.' And I'm just like, well, I’m not going to. Anytime you do fan service, a lot of time you are sacrificing something if you’re just trying to keep the same formula. It’s not what I want to do. I’m trying to grow and change."

The album's sound was commonly described as shoegaze by music publications, a label Anderson personally pushed back against, but generally accepts given the frequency the term is used towards the band. Consequence, conversely, felt that the album showed the band moving away from shoegaze into a more power pop sound. Lead single "Julia's War" was described as "bleary, muscular, catchy-as-hell power-pop" with heavy emphasis on distorted guitars. The song title is an allusion to the name of the record label of fellow shoegaze band They Are Gutting a Body of Water. Anderson described the track as emphasizing a more straightforward hook and more upfront vocals than what is usually utilized in shoegaze music. "Candle" was described as a "fuzz-pop love song". Certain song, particularly "Letter to Heaven", were influenced by the early music of Third Eye Blind, with Anderson noting that when writing and recording the song, he thought "We just gotta let the guitar sing here. This is a Third Eye Blind moment. We gotta let the guitarist do their thing.

== Release and promotion ==
The album's official name and release date, Raspberry Moon and June 20, 2025, was announced in April 2025. The album's lead single, "Julia's War", was released at the same time as the announcement. A music video for the track was released, involving various musicians and comedians going through a fictional "shoegaze bootcamp". A second single, "Candle", was released later in the same month. An accompanying music video, featuring Japanese fans reacting to the song, was released at the same time. "Candle" was named Stereogum's second best song of the week upon its release week. A third song, "Break Right", was released in promotion of the album in May.

== Reception ==
Professional ratings
Aggregate scores
Source	Rating
Metacritic	82/100
Review scores
Source	Rating
Rolling Stone	8/10
The Line of Best Fit	8/10

Raspberry Moon was generally well received by critics. At Metacritic, the album has an average score of 82 out of 100, which indicates "Universal acclaim" based on 12 reviews. Rolling Stone praised the album for building well on the sound established on Cartwheel, describing the album as "30 near-perfect minutes of shoegaze, with eyes peeking up at the horizon". The Line of Best Fit said of the album " What grabs me most about Raspberry Moon is this subtle quality inherent to a lot of the best shoegaze, and that’s understated romantics. Between the Summer haze of My Bloody Valentine and the dreamy date nights of Alvvays, getting lost in a current, a sea of sound, is a soul-arresting process...Fret not, guitar hero epics and riffs galore are abundant ...it's just that they now have even more space to exist, between ballads giving them literally more space, and his typical barnburners, now with fuller production."

Music publication Stereogum named the album their "Album of the Week" in its release week.

== Track listing ==
All tracks are written by Hotline TNT.

Raspberry Moon track listing
No.	Title	Length
1.	"Was I Wrong?"	3:38
2.	"Transition Lens"	1:41
3.	"The Scene"	2:21
4.	"Julia's War"	3:03
5.	"Letter to Heaven"	3:02
6.	"Break Right"	3:44
7.	"If Time Flies"	2:35
8.	"Candle"	4:25
9.	"Dance the Night Away"	2:54
10.	"Lawnmower"	4:01
11.	"Where U Been?"	3:57
Total length:		35:26

== Personnel ==
Credits adapted from the album's liner notes.

=== Hotline TNT ===
- Will Anderson (Note: Anderson is credited under his real name, DJ Big Poison, and Sandy Graphics.) – lead vocals, guitars, additional vocal recording, flute recording, layout, gang vocals on "Julia's War"
- Mike Ralston – drums, gang vocals on "Julia's War"
- Haylen Trammel – bass, gang vocals on "Julia's War"
- Lucky Hunter – guitars, gang vocals on "Julia's War"

=== Additional contributors ===
- Amos Pitsch – piano, vibraphone, auxiliary percussion, harmonies, production
- Tim Anderson – flute on "Was I Wrong?" and "Lawnmower"
- Julia Blair – gang vocals on "Julia's War"
- Alex Farrar – mixing
- Warren Defever – mastering
- Kathrin Remest – front cover art
- Kim in Times Square – calligraphy
- Charlie Boss – animal photos
- Brandon McClain – booklet photos
