= Private Music =

- Cover featuring a white corn snake. Select editions feature a purple background, and the cassette release features a blue background.

Studio album by Deftones
- Released: August 22, 2025
- Studios: Ameraycan (North Hollywood); Dead Aunt Thelma's (Portland); EastWest (Hollywood); Rock Falcon (Nashville); Sienna (Nashville)
- Genre: Alternative metal
- Length: 42:22
- Labels: Reprise; Warner
- Producers: Nick Raskulinecz; Deftones

Deftones chronology
Ohms (2020)	Private Music (2025)

Singles from Private Music
- 1. "My Mind Is a Mountain" Released: July 10, 2025; 2. "Milk of the Madonna" Released: August 8, 2025

Private Music (stylized in all lowercase) is the tenth studio album by American alternative metal band Deftones. It was released on August 22, 2025, through Reprise and Warner Records. It was preceded by two singles, "My Mind Is a Mountain" and "Milk of the Madonna". The album was produced by Nick Raskulinecz, who previously worked on the band's albums Diamond Eyes (2010) and Koi No Yokan (2012). It is the band's first album to feature the group's touring bassist, Fred Sablan. The band's first studio album since 2020's Ohms, Private Music marks the longest release gap between two Deftones albums. The album was nominated for Best Rock Album at the 68th Annual Grammy Awards.

== Background ==
Private Music marks the first Deftones album since Diamond Eyes (2010) not to feature bassist Sergio Vega, who left the band in 2021. Fred Sablan, who became the group's touring bassist a year later, cowrote and played on the album. Moreno performed more of the guitar parts on Private Music than previous albums due to Stephen Carpenter’s health problems which were later diagnosed as type 2 diabetes. Private Music has been described as alternative metal and shoegaze.

== Critical reception ==
Professional ratings
Aggregate scores
Source	Rating
AnyDecentMusic?	8.4/10
Metacritic	90/100
Review scores
Source	Rating
AllMusic	4.5/5 stars
Clash	9/10
DIY	4.5/5 stars
Kerrang!	5/5
The Line of Best Fit	9/10
Louder Than War	4/5 stars
Metal Hammer	4.5/5 stars
NME	5/5 stars
Pitchfork	7.6/10
Sputnikmusic	4.4/5

According to the review aggregator Metacritic, Private Music received "universal acclaim" based on a weighted average score of 90 out of 100 from 14 critic scores. Additionally, DIY said that track "Metal Dream" "embodies the ebb and flow most, taking the frontman back to the verge of nu metal rap with remarkable precision, far from cliche or pastiche, and paired with an ever-mesmerising chorus." NME's Andrew Trendell awarded Private Music a full five stars and concluded: "Very much a whole journey through a full-bodied and expansive fever dream, but this time somehow spiritual, intimate and direct, Deftones’ 10th album is a gift for fans old, new, and certainly finding them in the very distant future. Their peers can’t touch them."

== Accolades ==
Year	Organization	Category	Result	Ref.
2026	Grammy Awards	Best Rock Album	Nominated	

== Track listing ==
All lyrics are written by Chino Moreno; all music is composed by Abe Cunningham, Moreno, Frank Delgado, Fred Sablan and Stephen Carpenter.

Private Music track listing
No.	Title	Length
1.	"My Mind Is a Mountain"	2:50
2.	"Locked Club"	2:52
3.	"Ecdysis"	3:28
4.	"Infinite Source"	3:32
5.	"Souvenir"	6:10
6.	"CXZ"	3:12
7.	"I Think About You All the Time"	4:08
8.	"Milk of the Madonna"	4:08
9.	"Cut Hands"	3:01
10.	"Metal Dream"	3:02
11.	"Departing the Body"	5:59
Total length:		42:22

=== Notes ===
- All songs are stylized in all lowercase, except track 6, which is stylized as "cXz".
- "Metal Dream" is stylized as "~metal dream".

== Personnel ==
Credits adapted from the album's liner notes and Tidal.

=== Deftones ===
- Chino Moreno – vocals, guitar
- Stephen Carpenter – guitar
- Frank Delgado – keyboards, samples
- Abe Cunningham – drums

=== Additional contributors ===
- Fred Sablan – bass
- Deftones – production
- Nick Raskulinecz – production, engineering, recording
- Rich Costey – mixing
- Howie Weinberg – mastering
- Will Borza – mastering
- Nathan Yarborough – engineering
- Clemente Ruiz – additional engineering on "Ecdysis"

== Charts ==
=== Weekly charts ===
Chart performance for Private Music
Chart (2025)	Peak position
Australian Albums (ARIA)	3
Austrian Albums (Ö3 Austria)	3
Belgian Albums (Ultratop Flanders)	2
Belgian Albums (Ultratop Wallonia)	4
Canadian Albums (Billboard)	6
Croatian International Albums (HDU)	1
Danish Albums (Hitlisten)	20
Dutch Albums (Album Top 100)	4
Finnish Albums (Suomen virallinen lista)	10
French Albums (SNEP)	5
French Rock & Metal Albums (SNEP)	1
German Albums (Offizielle Top 100)	5
German Rock & Metal Albums (Offizielle Top 100)	2
Hungarian Albums (MAHASZ)	2
Icelandic Albums (Tónlistinn)	9
Irish Albums (Official Charts)	12
Italian Albums (FIMI)	20
Japanese Digital Albums (Oricon)	17
Japanese Download Albums (Billboard Japan)	21
Japanese Western Albums (Oricon)	19
Lithuanian Albums (AGATA)	29
New Zealand Albums (RMNZ)	2
Norwegian Albums (IFPI Norge)	39
Polish Albums (ZPAV)	8
Portuguese Albums (AFP)	4
Scottish Albums (Official Charts)	2
Spanish Albums (PROMUSICAE)	13
Swedish Albums (Sverigetopplistan)	25
Swiss Albums (Schweizer Hitparade)	4
UK Albums (Official Charts)	2
UK Rock & Metal Albums (Official Charts)	1
US Billboard 200	5
US Top Rock & Alternative Albums (Billboard)	1

=== Year-end charts ===
Year-end chart performance for Private Music
Chart (2025)	Position
Croatian International Albums (HDU)	13
