= Everything Ends (Architects song) =

2025 song by Architects

- Daniel Joseph Remix cover art

Single by Architects

from the album The Sky, the Earth & All Between
- Released: February 24, 2025
- Genre: Pop metal; melodic metalcore
- Length: 3:40
- Label: Epitaph
- Composers: Sam Carter; Dan Searle; Jordan Fish
- Lyricist: Searle
- Producer: Fish

Architects singles chronology
"Blackhole" (2025)	"Everything Ends" (2025)	"Brain Dead" (2025)

"Everything Ends" is a song by English metalcore band Architects. The track was released as the fifth single from their eleventh studio album, The Sky, the Earth & All Between, on February 24, 2025. It is the band's first song to reach No. 1 on the Billboard Mainstream Rock Airplay chart, doing so in September 2025.

== Release and promotion ==
On February 24, 2025, Architects released "Everything Ends" as a single from The Sky, The Earth & All Between, accompanied by a visualizer.

An official remix of the song, reworked by drummer Dan Searle, was released on April 27, 2026.

== Composition ==
Paul Brown of Wall of Sound characterised "Everything Ends" as a softer radio-rock song in a "similar vein to Bring Me the Horizon's Medicine". Revolver called the song a "melodic metalcore anthem". Emily Garner of Kerrang! placed the track on the "catchier" and "poppier" end of the spectrum, while Merlin Alderslade of Louder Sound referred to it as "pure post-That's the Spirit pop metal". Ed Walton of Distorted Sound identified it as the album's only poppier song, writing that its guitars give it an anthemic feel while its synthesizers give it a darker tone. God Is in the TV also noted the presence of a keyboard melody throughout the song.

== Reception ==
James Hickie of Kerrang! felt that "Everything Ends" was "a little too familiar". Josh Allen of God Is in the TV characterised the song as a Linkin Park tribute track.

== Track listing ==
All lyrics are written by Dan Searle, with additional writers where noted; all music is composed by Searle, and Sam Carter, with additional composers where noted.

"Everything Ends" single
No.	Title	Lyrics	Music	Length
1.	"Everything Ends"		Jordan Fish	3:40
2.	"Blackhole"		Fish	3:20
3.	"Whiplash"		Fish	3:46
4.	"Curse"		Fish	3:01
5.	"Seeing Red"	Carter		3:40
Total length:				17:28

"Broken Mirror / Everything Ends (Daniel Joseph remix)" single
No.	Title	Length
1.	"Broken Mirror" (Daniel Joseph remix)	3:09
2.	"Everything Ends" (Daniel Joseph remix)	3:38
Total length:		6:47

== Chart performance ==
"Everything Ends" reached number one on the Billboard Mainstream Rock Airplay chart on September 27, 2025, becoming Architects' first number-one song on a Billboard songs chart.

== Personnel ==
Credits adapted from Apple Music.

Architects

- Sam Carter – vocals
- Dan Searle – drums
- Adam Christianson – guitar
- Alex Ali Dean – bass

Production

- Jordan Fish – production
- Zakk Cervini – mixing, mastering
- Julian Gargiulo – mixing assistance, recording engineering
- Chris Clancy – guitar engineering
- Pete Miles – bass engineering
- Adam "Nolly" Getgood – drum engineering

== Charts ==
=== Weekly charts ===
Weekly chart performance for "Everything Ends"
Chart (2025–2026)	Peak position
Finland Airplay (Radiosoittolista)	55
US Rock & Alternative Airplay (Billboard)	16
US Mainstream Rock Airplay (Billboard)	1

=== Year-end charts ===
Year-end chart performance for "Everything Ends"
Chart (2025)	Position
US Mainstream Rock Airplay (Billboard)	2
