= My Mind Is a Mountain =

Single by Deftones

from the album Private Music
- Released: July 10, 2025
- Genre: Alternative rock; shoegaze; heavy metal; noise rock
- Length: 2:50
- Label: Reprise; Warner
- Composers: Chino Moreno; Stephen Carpenter; Fred Sablan; Frank Delgado; Abe Cunningham
- Lyricist: Chino Moreno
- Producer: Nick Raskulinecz

Deftones singles chronology
"Ceremony" (2021)	"My Mind Is a Mountain" (2025)	"Milk of the Madonna" (2025)

Music video
- "My Mind Is a Mountain" on YouTube

"My Mind Is a Mountain" (stylized in all lowercase) is a song by the American alternative metal band Deftones, released on July 10, 2025, as the lead single from their tenth album, Private Music. Marking their first new material in five years, the song was promoted with teasers on social media before premiering on Apple Music. It combines heavy guitar riffs with ambient textures and has been noted for drawing from multiple eras of the band's sound, including elements of shoegaze, industrial, and alternative metal. Produced by Nick Raskulinecz, the track features dynamic shifts in tone and intensity, with vocals ranging from melodic to distorted.

"My Mind Is a Mountain" peaked at number 2 on the US Bubbling Under Hot 100, Deftones' closest approach to the Billboard Hot 100 to date. Internationally, it reached number 88 on the UK singles chart and number 8 on the UK Rock & Metal chart. The song received generally positive reviews from critics, who praised its production and familiarity, though some noted a lack of innovation. A performance-based music video accompanied the release, depicting the band in a darkened space with stark lighting and growing flashes of color.

== Composition ==
"My Mind Is a Mountain" combines elements from across Deftones' discography, incorporating heavy, down-tuned guitars with ambient and industrial textures reminiscent of Koi No Yokan (2012) and Gore (2016). The song opens with immediate drop-tuned riffs and forceful percussion, maintaining a high level of energy throughout its brief runtime. The arrangement moves between aggressive metal passages and more spacious, atmospheric sections, with layered white noise and shoegaze textures adding to its density. The lead vocalist Chino Moreno's vocals alternate between melodic choruses and distorted wails, with the chorus placing greater emphasis on tonal delivery than lyrical clarity. Elijah Pareño of Rolling Stone Philippines opined that the track's noise rock elements overlap with Moreno's side project Crosses. The production by Nick Raskulinecz has been noted for its modern, polished sound, and the interplay between alternative metal heaviness and shoegazy ambience reflects the band's ongoing fusion of genre influences. Billboard's Jason Lipshutz described the song as a "pummeling" entry in the band's catalog, with its quickened tempo and immediate harmonies recalling some of their earlier work.

== Release ==
Deftones released "My Mind Is a Mountain" on July 10, 2025, as the lead single from their tenth studio album, Private Music. The track marked the band's first new material in five years and signaled the beginning of a new era for the group. In the days leading up to its release, the band teased the single through cryptic posts on social media, pairing abstract phrases such as "why do we bathe in this psyche" and "remain calm in our mental" with artistically blurred imagery of the group. The song's title was officially revealed on the morning of July 10, followed by its premiere on Apple Music later that day at 6 p.m. ET.

== Music video ==
The music video for "My Mind Is a Mountain" was released on July 15, 2025, shortly after the single debuted. Teased days earlier through a brief social media clip showing a behind-the-back and overhead shot of Moreno pacing in anticipation of the guitarist Stephen Carpenter's intro riff, the full video presents the band performing in a dimly lit, empty room. According to Liberty Dunworth of NME, the visuals emphasize the song's intensity, showing the band in stark black-and-white flashes, with Moreno delivering vocals up close to the microphone. As the video progresses, flashes of red light are introduced. Revolver's Gregory Adams described the band's performance as bringing "all-caps ENERGY", contrasting this with the band's "lower-caps-scripted new era".

== Reception ==
=== Critical ===
"My Mind Is a Mountain" received generally positive reviews from critics, though with some reservations. Revolver's Gregory Adams included the track in the magazine's "6 Best New Songs Right Now" roundup, writing, "On point as ever, it's another Deftones banger certain to remain in our collective consciousness for years to come." Andrew Sacher of BrooklynVegan praised Raskulinecz's production as "modern and cutting edge", and felt the track stood "tall next to Deftones' own classics", noting that it sounded "even fresher in 2025 than some of those records do". He wrote that the song reinforced the idea that "there's nothing like the real thing", and credited Deftones with having "naturally evolved in tandem with a world that's finally catching up to them". Pareño awarded the single 4 out of 5 stars, describing it as "a refinement" rather than a reinvention. He noted that the track offered "a familiar anchor" for longtime fans while remaining accessible to new listeners, adding that the band "hasn't lost their grip on what makes them tick". In contrast, Jonah Krueger writing for Consequence offered a more mixed assessment, calling it a "more-than-passable late-career Deftones tune" but expressing disappointment in its lack of stylistic progression. He felt the song "hits hard while it's on but doesn't leave much of a mark once it's over", and suggested that it might have worked better as a deep album cut rather than the band's lead return single.

=== Commercial ===
"My Mind Is a Mountain" peaked at number twenty-four on Billboard's Alternative Airplay chart and number five on the Mainstream Rock chart. While it did not enter the Billboard Hot 100, it reached number two on the Bubbling Under Hot 100 chart. It surpassed "Change (In the House of Flies)" (2000), which peaked at number five, to become the band's closest approach to the main chart. In its first full week of tracking (July 11–17), the track recorded 5.3 million official US streams, 1.7 million radio audience impressions, and sold 1,000 downloads, according to Luminate; it had accumulated 419,000 streams on its first day. Internationally, the song peaked at number 88 on the UK singles chart and number eight on the UK Rock & Metal chart.

== Personnel ==
- Chino Moreno – vocals
- Stephen Carpenter – guitar
- Fred Sablan – bass
- Frank Delgado – keyboards
- Abe Cunningham – drums

== Charts ==
=== Weekly charts ===
Weekly chart performance for "My Mind Is a Mountain"
Chart (2025)	Peak position
New Zealand Hot Singles (RMNZ)	12
UK Singles (Official Charts)	89
UK Rock & Metal (Official Charts)	8
US Bubbling Under Hot 100 (Billboard)	2
US Hot Rock & Alternative Songs (Billboard)	11
US Mainstream Rock (Billboard)	1
US Rock & Alternative Airplay (Billboard)	3

=== Year-end charts ===
Year-end chart performance for "My Mind Is a Mountain"
Chart (2025)	Position
US Hot Rock & Alternative Songs (Billboard)	87
