= The Crash Motive =

American rock band

The Crash Motive (formerly Omnisoul)
- Origin: Newark, Delaware, U.S.
- Genres: Rock, pop rock
- Years active: Early 2000s–2008
- Labels: Wind-Up Records
- Members: Shawn Manigly (guitar); Josh Berger (bass); Jamie Orlando (keyboard); Josh Dannin (drums)
- Past members: Derek Fuhrmann (vocals/guitar); Tyler Ingersoll (drums)
- Website: www.thecrashmotive.com

The Crash Motive was an American rock band on the record label Wind-Up Records. The band, formed in the early 2000s, consisted of five members who met at the University of Delaware. The band was formerly known as Omnisoul, until summer 2007.

== Biography ==
Omnisoul started with singer/songwriter Derek Fuhrmann, who found keyboardist Jamie Orlando, bassist Josh Berger, guitarist Wayne Silver, and drummer Tyler Ingersoll to join him. They named themselves Omnisoul, and Silver left as they were joined by guitarist Shawn Manigly.

Fuhrmann and Orlando took music management courses to try to direct their band in the correct direction. During their first real gig, they won a Battle of the Bands at the University of Delaware. In addition, Omnisoul caught the eye of WSTW, Delaware's Top 40 radio station, with their song "Waiting (Save Your Life)". The song spent 29 consecutive nights as the #1 most-requested song. To this day, the band still holds the station record. This led to the song's inclusion on the TV show Joan of Arcadia (CBS) and on the Fantastic Four Soundtrack, as well as placement in the movie.

The band's song "Not Giving Up" was featured in EA Sports' Madden NFL 07 video game. The song originally gained recognition while being played in sports stadiums around the country.

The band worked with producer Gregg Wattenberg (Five for Fighting) and engineer Greg Gordon (Jet, Oasis) for their album Consequence, which was released in October 2007.

On July 16, 2007, they released a bulletin on MySpace stating that they are changing their band name to The Crash Motive.

In November 2008, they announced that the band would come to an end due to the departure of frontman Fuhrmann. Their last gig took place on December 27, 2008, in Deer Park Tavern in their hometown Newark, Delaware.

On June 27, 2025, Fuhrmann died from cancer at the age of 44.

== Discography ==
- "Happy Outside" - released 2004
- "When You Go" - released May 2006; Wind-Up Records
- Consequence - released October 2007; Wind-Up Records
- "Just Cause It Never Happened Don't Mean It Won't" - released August 2008

=== Also on ===
- "Waiting (Save Your Life)" - From the Fantastic 4 Soundtrack
- "When You Go (Single)"
- "Not Giving Up" - Featured on the Madden NFL 07 Soundtrack

== Lineup ==
- Derek Fuhrmann - Vocals (died 2025)
- Shawn Manigly - Guitar
- Josh Berger - Bass
- Jamie Orlando - Keyboard
- Tyler Ingersoll - Drums
- Josh Dannin - Drums
