= Peter Hook & the Light =

British post-punk band

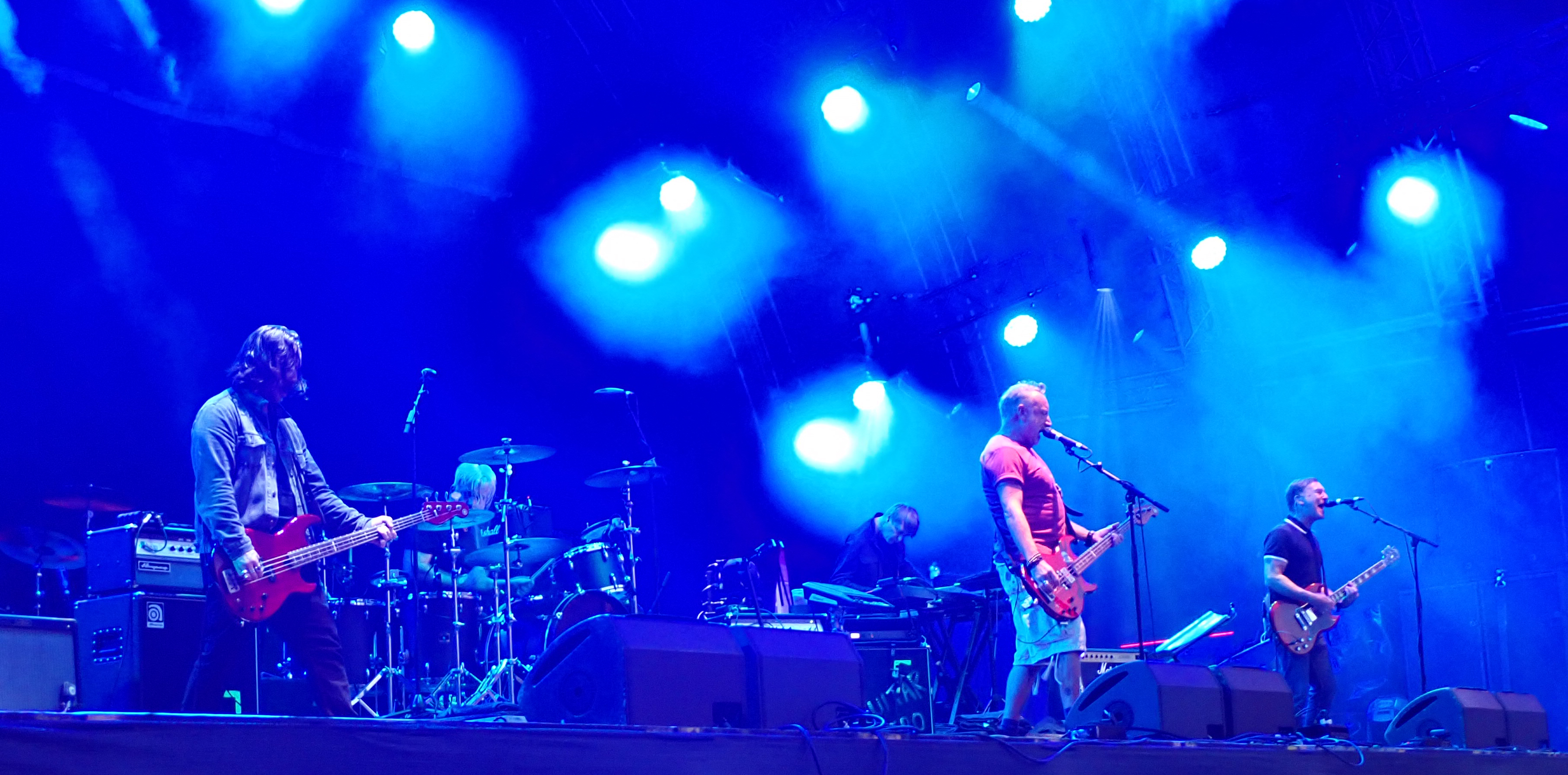
- Peter Hook & the Light performing in 2023

Background information
- Origin: United Kingdom
- Genres: Post-punk; alternative rock; new wave; alternative dance; synthpop
- Years active: 2010–present
- Label: Haçienda
- Spinoff of: Joy Division; New Order
- Members: Peter Hook; Jack Bates; Paul Kehoe; David Potts; Martin Rebelski
- Past members: Andy Poole; Nat Wason; Fred Sablan; Yves Altana; Paul Duffy
- Website: peterhookandthelight.live

Peter Hook & the Light are an English post-punk band, formed in May 2010 by bassist and vocalist Peter Hook, formerly of the influential post-punk bands Joy Division and New Order. The band also features Hook's son Jack Bates (bass), as well as Andy Poole (keyboards) and Paul Kehoe (drums), who both played with Hook as part of Monaco, one of Hook's previous groups. From the first gigs in May 2010, Nat Wason (formerly of Haven) was the group's guitarist, however in July 2013 he was replaced by David Potts, another former member of Monaco.

The band is noted for performing the Joy Division and New Order albums live. The band gained some criticism from the other New Order members, Bernard Sumner and Stephen Morris (also of Joy Division) and Gillian Gilbert, after New Order's reunion without Hook. The band is also occasionally accompanied by Rowetta, who performs guest vocals.

== History ==
=== Background ===
Hook was a founding member of Joy Division (1976-1980), which broke up after the suicide of vocalist Ian Curtis. The surviving members soon formed New Order, with Hook handling lead vocals on a few early songs before Bernard Sumner became the band's primary singer. Both bands enjoyed success: Joy Division were recognized (after having disbanded) as an early example of post punk due to their experiments with the genre, and New Order during their career as they fused post-punk with electronic dance music. New Order had several hiatuses due to personal obligations and creative differences. In 2007, Hook stated that he and Sumner were no longer speaking or working together, and in 2009 Sumner announced he no longer wished to make music with New Order. Hook would form The Light with the intention of playing every song he ever recorded live. New Order would eventually reform in 2011 for live performances, without Hook.

=== 2010: Joy Division Unknown Pleasures tour ===
Hook opened a new club and live venue in Manchester, FAC 251 – The Factory, in February 2010, where he and The Light had their first performance, performing a set filled with songs from Joy Division, New Order and others from his back catalogue. The club is situated in the old head offices of Factory Records in Manchester city centre. On 18 May 2010, the 30th anniversary of Ian Curtis' death, the Light performed a set of Joy Division songs including every track from Unknown Pleasures. The band would tour England, Europe, Australia, New Zealand and the United, where they would play the album live in its entirety.

=== 2011: Joy Division Closer tour ===
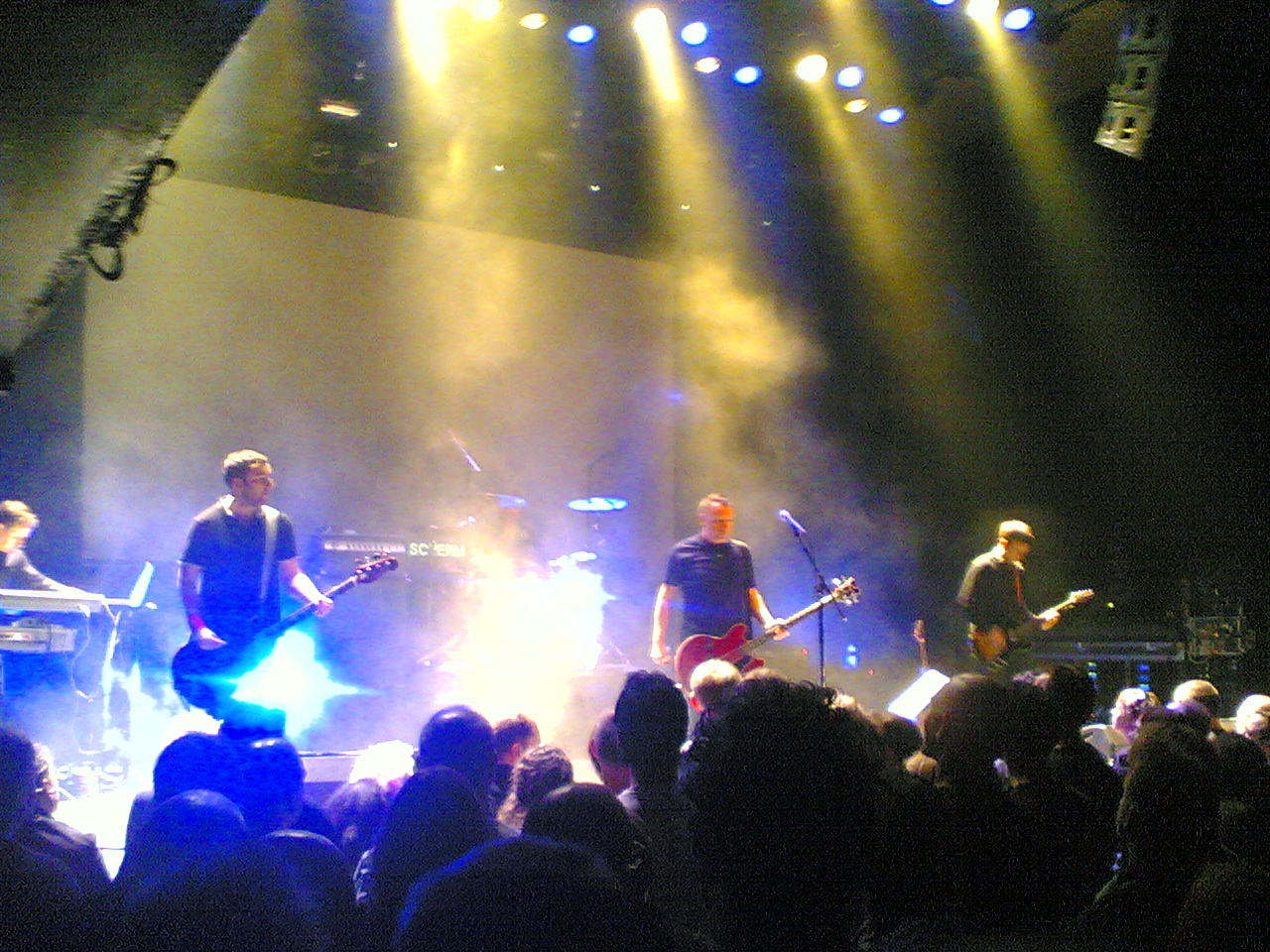
Peter Hook & The Light performing at the Paard van Troje in The Hague, Netherlands (28 May 2011)

Hook and his band began 2011 with more European tour dates, taking in Portugal, France, Spain, Netherlands, Finland and Norway. The band's debut EP, 1102 | 2011 EP, was released on 9 May 2011. It features four Joy Division songs, one of which is a rework of "Pictures In My Mind" which was unreleased at that time.

On 18 and 19 May 2011, one year on from when the band first played Unknown Pleasures live, Peter Hook & The Light performed Joy Division's second album, Closer, live for the first time, again with two sold out nights at Hook's Factory nightclub. The debut Closer shows were followed by more extensive touring, the band visited Brazil for the first time in June 2011 as well as performing at various festivals across Europe. In September 2011, Hook and his band embarked on their second North American tour, this time taking in nine cities in the USA as well as visiting Canada for the first time to perform in Toronto and Montreal. As in 2010, Hook invited several of his famous friends to join him on stage as guest vocalists. Perry Farrell again joined the band at the Music Box in Los Angeles, this time to sing 'Isolation'. Moby performed a total of seven songs live with The Light across the two dates in Los Angeles, while Smashing Pumpkins frontman Billy Corgan joined Hook on stage in Chicago to sing 'Transmission' and 'Love Will Tear Us Apart'. Following these dates, The Light played three sold out shows in Mexico, performing in Tijuana, Guadalajara and Mexico City. After these dates, the band took a short break before resuming touring in November with gigs in Israel, Greece, Denmark, Italy and Holland.

=== 2012: Joy Division albums tour and Joy Division Still live dates ===
The Light began 2012 by performing Unknown Pleasures and Closer shows live in Luxembourg, Spain, Germany, Slovakia, Poland, Czech Republic, Russia, Finland, Norway, Sweden and Japan as well as back at home in the UK. The Light first performed both Joy Division albums live together in the same night at a special hometown show at the Buxton Opera House on 25 February 2012. The band also played three tracks from New Order's first album Movement at this show - a precursor of what would follow in 2013. The band's first proper UK tour took place in May/June 2012. During this, the band would also play Joy Division's Still album in its entirety for two dates in Manchester on 18 and 19 May 2012. A second UK tour would follow in November 2012. The Light also continued to tour in Europe with sold out shows in Belgium, France, Holland, Italy & Portugal.

=== 2013: New Order Movement and Power Corruption & Lies tour ===
In January 2013, Hook turned his focus from Joy Division to New Order and performed the first two New Order albums, Movement and Power, Corruption & Lies, live for the first time at three special shows in the UK. The band performed an intimate, warm-up show at Clwb Ifor Bach, in Cardiff before then performing two large, sold out shows at KOKO in London and the Manchester Cathedral. The Manchester Cathedral show was later released as a live album by online recording company Play Concert. Following these shows, the band took a short break before resuming their shows performing the Joy Division material in more new places including Slovenia, Croatia, Hungary, Switzerland and Austria as well as with return visits to Poland and Russia. Summer 2013 saw The Light perform at various festivals including EJEKT 2013 in Athens, Greece & the 2013 MIDI Festival in the south of France. On 23 June 2013, Peter Hook & The Light performed both Joy Division albums live in Ian Curtis' hometown of Macclesfield, within the unique surroundings of Christ Church. The Light also performed their Movement and Power, Corruption & Lies set for only the fourth time ever by returning to the Buxton Opera House on 23 July 2013.

September 2013 saw Peter Hook & The Light officially begin their Movement and Power, Corruption & Lies world tour, which spanned both North and South America as well as the UK & Ireland. The band also returned to Greece to follow their 2011 Unknown Pleasures shows by performing Closer live in Athens & Thessaloniki.

=== 2014–2015: Joy Division albums and New Order Low-Life and Brotherhood tour ===
Following their 2013 tour of Movement and Power, Corruption, and Lies, Peter Hook & The Light embarked on a North American fall tour in 2014, performing the New Order albums Low-Life and Brotherhood.

In February 2015, the band toured Australia and New Zealand playing a 50-minute selection of Joy Division tracks, the New Order albums Low-Life and Brotherhood and some New Order singles. On 18 May 2015, the band performed a complete retrospective performance of Joy Division's entire catalogue, in chronological order, in Christ Church. This was to mark the 35th anniversary of the death of Joy Division frontman Ian Curtis. The event sold out in minutes.

In June, Jack Bates became the touring bass player for The Smashing Pumpkins for their The End Times Tour.

=== 2016–2018: Substance Live tour ===
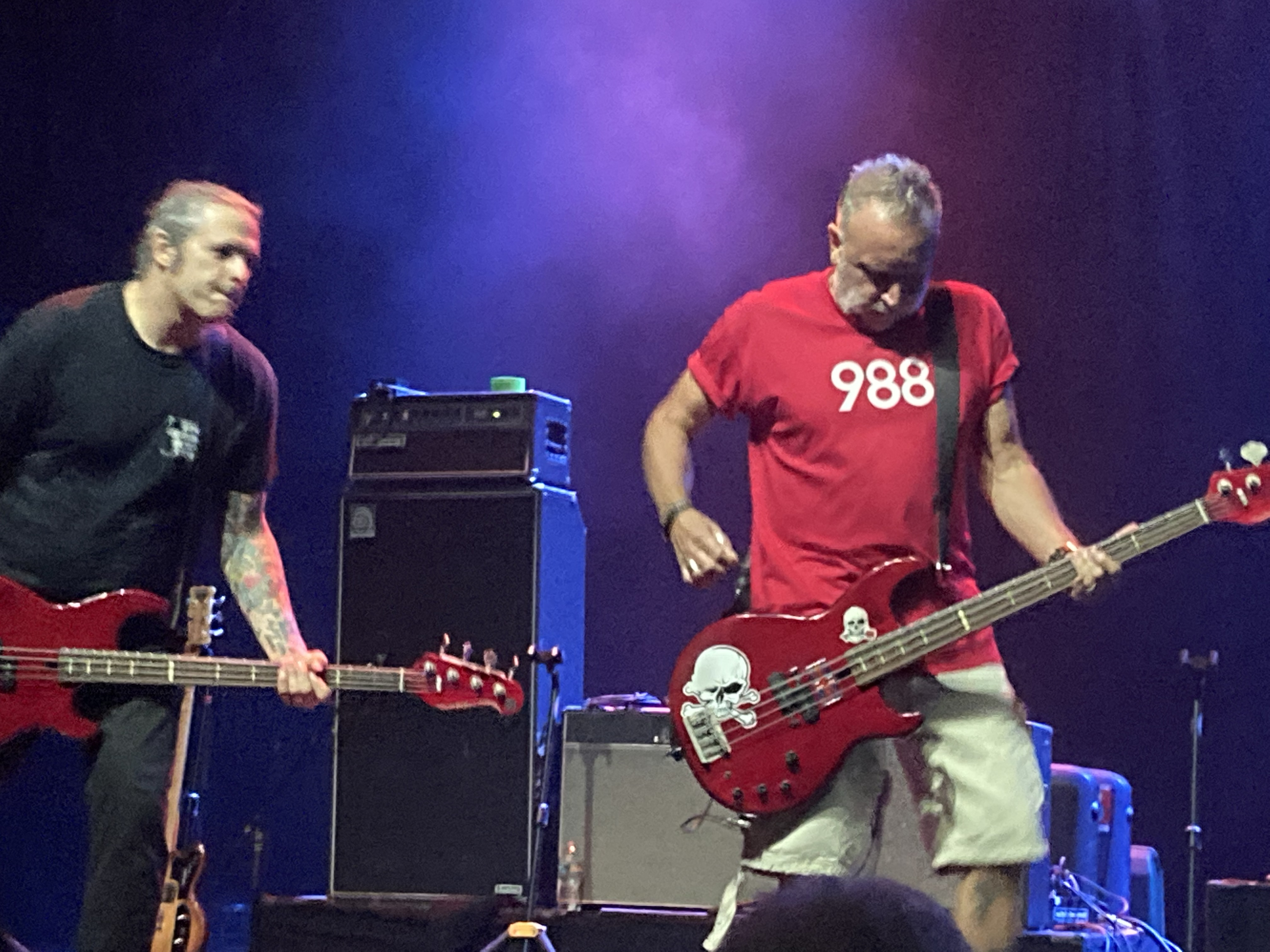
Peter Hook & The Light performing at Terminal 5, New York, August 2022

In 2016, the band toured Europe and the UK playing singles mainly from Joy Division's Substance album, and on some tour dates the singles from New Order's Substance album. Starting in June, the band continued touring in the UK, and then the United States and Canada where they would play both a New Order set and a Joy Division set with tracks from Substance. In December, the band toured South America. The band continued touring in 2017 with gigs in England and Wales, and plans to tour Australia and the United States.

In 2017, for Record Store Day, the band released four live albums covering their concert gigs in Dublin, Leeds, and Manchester, where they covered the Joy Division albums Closer and Unknown Pleasures, as well as the New Order albums Movement and Power Corruption & Lies. In 2018, the band continued touring in Australia, Europe, and the US, this time without Jack Bates.

=== 2019–2022: New Order Technique and Republic tour, Joy Division Orchestrated, and others ===
In 2019, the band covered the New Order albums Technique and Republic while touring the UK and North America. On 5 July 2019, the band performed an orchestral rendition of Joy Division songs with the Manchester Camerata at the Royal Albert Hall. Guest vocalists included Natalie Findlay, Mica Miller and Bastien Marshall. In August, they worked with The Metropolitan Orchestra to perform the set in Australia.

On 18 May 2020, the band video-streamed their 2015 Macclesfield performance under the title So This Is Permanent for 24 hours on YouTube. Donations were requested to help the Epilepsy Society, and a DVD would be released in June.

In October 2021, Peter Hook and the Light announced the “Joy Division: A Celebration" tour across the United States and Canada. The tour set for August and September 2022 has 26 tour stops.

=== 2023–present: Substance live tour and New Order Get Ready live dates ===
On November 14, 2023, Peter Hook and the Light announced that they would again be playing the Substance albums from both Joy Division and New Order in 2024. The band planned a massive tour across Australia and New Zealand, North America and the UK and Ireland.

On September 10, 2024, the band announced a string of dates in 2025 where they would perform New Order's Get Ready in its entirety.

In 2026, Peter Hook and the Light began its North American tour of Get Ready, with selected Joy Division and New Order tracks. Hook's son, Jack Bates, joined the tour.

== Band members ==
- Peter Hook – lead vocals, bass, guitars, melodica, electronic drums (2010–present)
- Jack Bates – bass, electronic drums, cymbals, cowbell (2010–present)
- Paul Kehoe – drums, keyboards, synthesizers, programming (2010–present)
- David Potts – guitars, backing vocals, keyboards, synthesizers, melodica (2013–present)
- Martin Rebelski – keyboards, synthesizers, programming (2017–present)

Former touring members

- Andy Poole – keyboards, backing vocals, synthesizers, programming, vocoder, syn drum (2010–2016)
- Nat Wason – guitars (2010–2013)
- Fred Sablan – bass (2018)
- Yves Altana – bass, guitars, backing vocals (2018–2019)
- Paul Duffy – bass (2022–2024)

Featured guests

- Rowetta – guest vocals

== Discography ==
=== EPs ===
- 1102 | 2011 EP (2011, Haçienda Records)

=== Live albums ===
- Joy Division's Unknown Pleasures – Orchestral Version (2010)
- Peter Hook's The Light Perform "Unknown Pleasures" Live At Goodwood (2010, Abbey Road Live Here Now)
- Unknown Pleasures – Live In Australia (2011, Pylon Records)
- Joy Division's Unknown Pleasures and Closer (Live At Hebden Bridge) (2014)
- New Order's Low Life and Brotherhood (Live At Hebden Bridge) (2014)
- New Order's Movement and Power Corruption and Lies (Live At Hebden Bridge) (2014)
- So This Is Permanence (2015, Live Here Now)
- Substance: The Albums of Joy Division and New Order (Live At Apollo Theatre – Manchester 16/06/16) (2016)
- Joy Division's Unknown Pleasures and Closer, New Order's Movement (Live At Roundhouse, Camden) (2017)
- Closer Live Tour 2011 – Live in Manchester (2017)
- Movement Tour 2013 – Live in Dublin (2017)
- Power, Corruption, & Lies Tour 2013 – Live in Dublin (2017)
- Unknown Pleasures Tour 2012 – Live in Leeds (2017)
- New Order's Technique & Republic Live at the Electric Ballroom Camden (2018)
- Joy Division: A Celebration (Live) (2022)
- Get Ready Live at O2 Victoria Warehouse Manchester – 19/04/2025 (2026)
