= Fred Sablan =

American musician

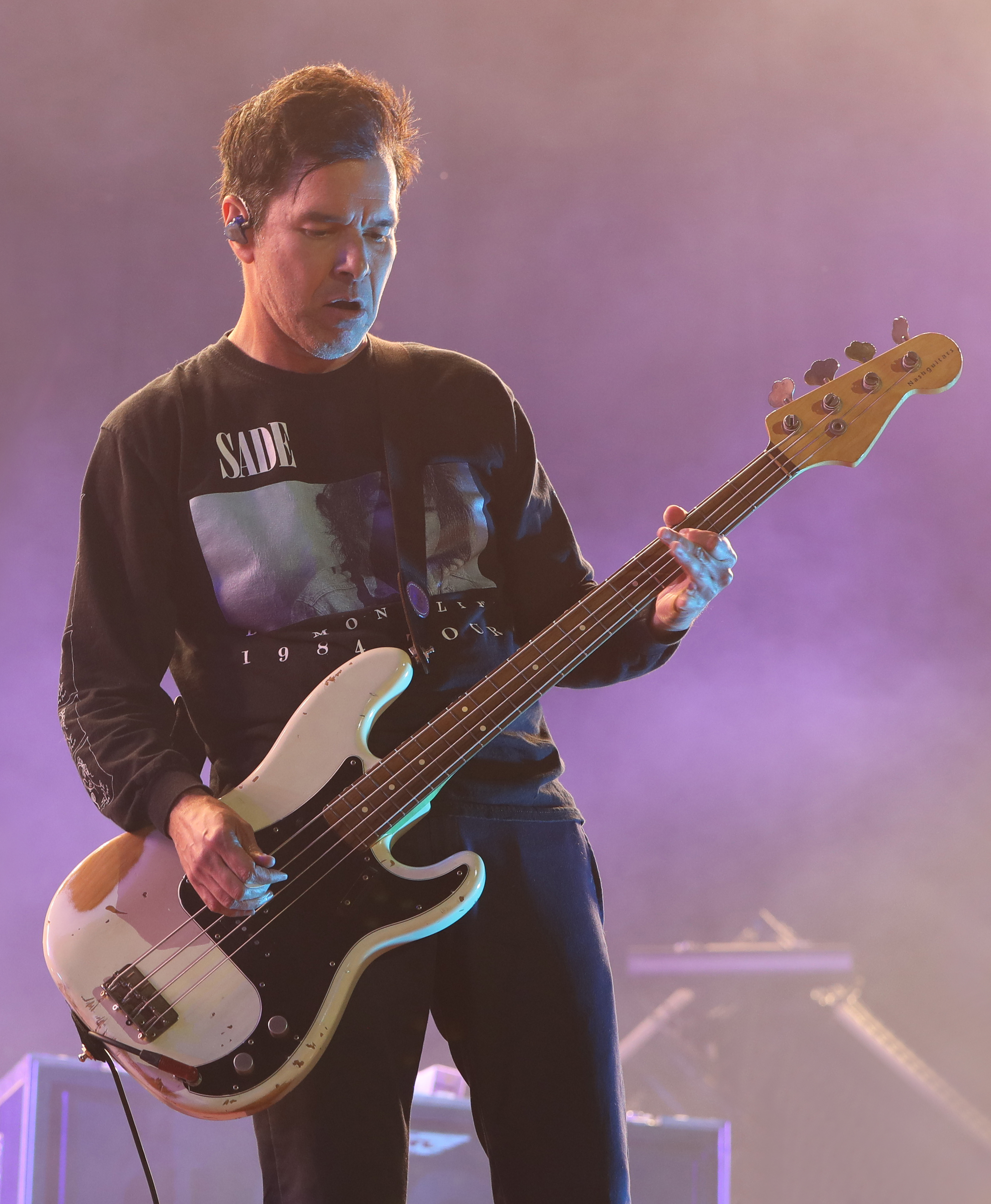
- Sablan performing in 2022

Background information
- Born: April 28, 1970 (age 56)
- Origin: Cupertino, California, U.S.
- Genres: Punk rock; hard rock; alternative rock
- Occupation: Musician
- Instruments: Bass guitar; guitar
- Years active: 1993–present
- Member of: Deftones; Heavens Blade
- Formerly of: Marilyn Manson; Goon Moon; Peter Hook and the Light; Marriages; Chelsea Wolfe; 8mm; Kidneythieves; Crack; Butcher Holler

Fred Sablan is an American musician originally from Cupertino, California, best known as the current bassist of the alternative metal band Deftones. He was a touring bassist for artists such as Goon Moon, Marilyn Manson, Chelsea Wolfe, and Peter Hook and the Light. Additionally, he is the founder and bassist of the hardcore punk band Heavens Blade.

== Career ==
=== Goon Moon (2007) ===
During 2007, Sablan was involved as both a live bassist and occasional guitarist for Jeordie White and Chris Goss side project Goon Moon.

=== Marilyn Manson (2010–2014) ===
In July 2010, it was revealed that Sablan had been named as the new bass player for Marilyn Manson. He was involved with the recording and writing of the album Born Villain. Touring for the Hey, Cruel World Tour started in February 2012 at the Soundwave Festival in Australia and then in Japan. Sablan completed touring on the Hey, Cruel World Tour, Twins of Evil, and Masters of Madness tours by July 2013 in the US and Europe. He departed the band in June 2014.

=== Recording and touring (2014–present) ===
Sablan has recorded with a few projects, including hip hop artist Cage and the band Marriages (featuring Emma Ruth Rundle). He has also performed live with 8mm, Spirit in the Room, Kidneythieves, Peter Hook and the Light, Wes Borland and Chelsea Wolfe.

=== Heavens Blade (2018–present) ===
In October of 2018, it was announced that Sablan had formed a hardcore punk band called Heavens Blade with Sara Taylor of Youth Code, Alex Lopez of Suicide Silence, and Piggy D of Rob Zombie, and released a single on Bandcamp. They released a five-song EP in the fall of 2019.

=== Deftones (2022–present) ===
In April 2022, it was announced that Sablan would be the touring bassist for Deftones following the departure of Sergio Vega. Sablan co-wrote and played bass on the band’s album Private Music, which was released on August 22, 2025.

== Selected Discography ==
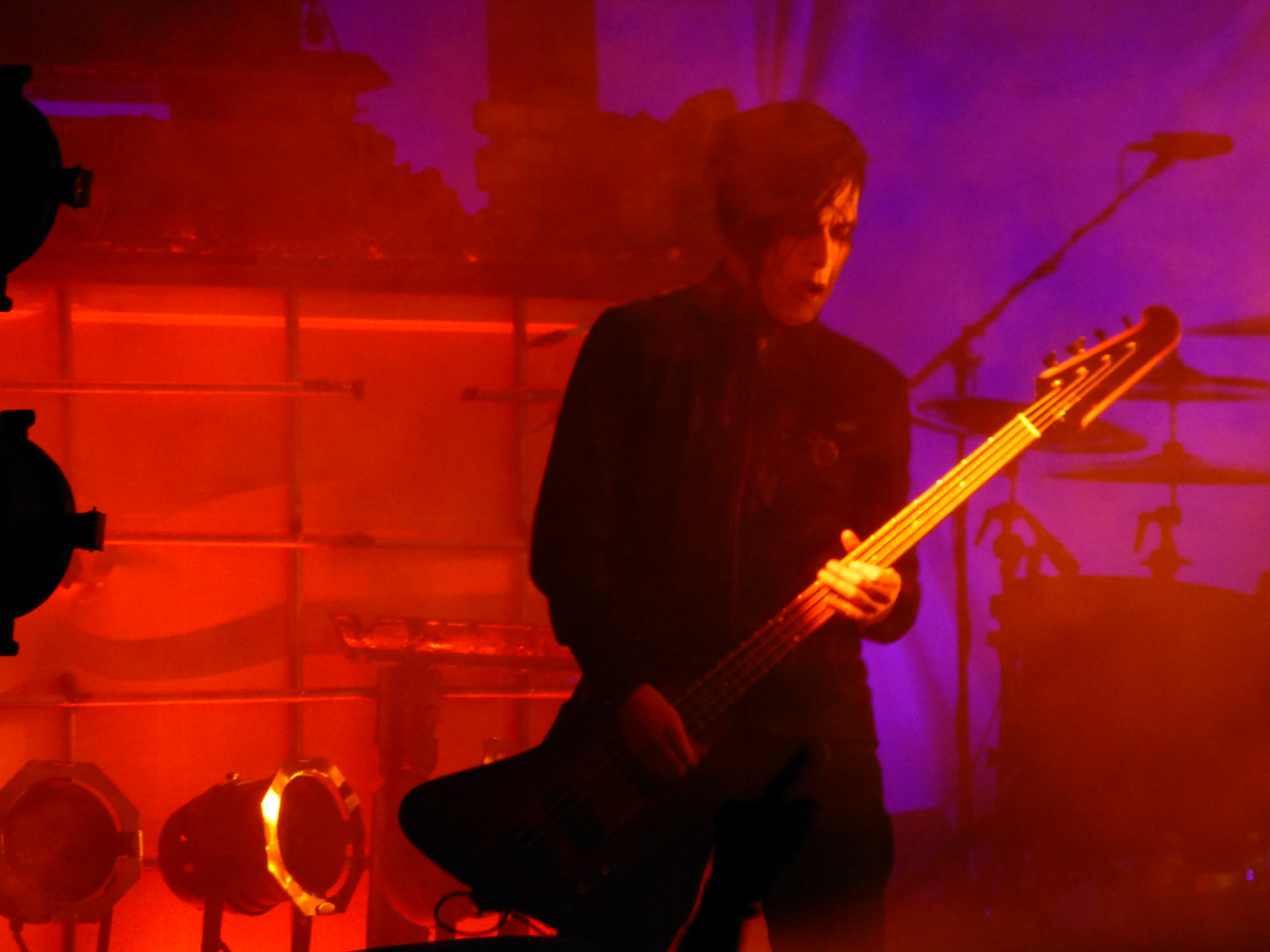
Sablan performing with Marilyn Manson in 2013

Crack

- 1995: "Pooberty"
- 1997: "Losing One's Cool"

Butcher Holler

- 2003: "I Heart Rock"

Marilyn Manson

- 2012: Born Villain

Marriages

- 2015: "Salome" (Fred plays guitar on 3 songs)

Heavens Blade

- 2018: "Spoiled Rotten" single
- 2019: 5 song EP

Deftones

- 2025: Private Music
