= L.I.V.E. in São Paulo =

2026 Bring Me the Horizon live album

L.I.V.E. in São Paulo (Live Immersive Virtual Experiment)
- Theatrical release poster

Live album by Bring Me the Horizon
- Released: 25 March 2026 (theatrical); 10 April 2026 (streaming and physical)
- Recorded: 30 November 2024
- Venue: Allianz Parque, São Paulo, Brazil
- Genre: Alternative rock; alternative metal; metalcore
- Length: 89:45
- Label: Sony; RCA; Trafalgar Entertainment
- Director: Circus Head; Oli Sykes

Bring Me the Horizon chronology
Lo-files (2025)	L.I.V.E. in São Paulo (Live Immersive Virtual Experiment) (2026)	Count Your Blessings | Repented (2026)

Bring Me the Horizon video chronology
Live at the Royal Albert Hall (2016)	L.I.V.E. in São Paulo (2026)

Album cover
- Physical and streaming album cover

L.I.V.E. in São Paulo (Live Immersive Virtual Experiment) is the third live album and video by British rock band Bring Me the Horizon. It was recorded on 30 November 2024 at the Allianz Parque in São Paulo, Brazil. The live film was shown in cinemas worldwide on 25–28 March 2026, and released physically and digitally on 10 April 2026. The theatrical release grossed $490,794 worldwide, with a gross of $336,363 in the United Kingdom.

== Track listing ==
All music is composed by Bring Me the Horizon.

L.I.V.E. in São Paulo track listing
No.	Title	Original album	Length
1.	"(Interlude) Press Start"		0:48
2.	"Darkside"	Post Human: Nex Gen	3:58
3.	"Mantra"	Amo	3:55
4.	"Happy Song"	That's the Spirit	5:10
5.	"Teardrops"	Post Human: Survival Horror	4:17
6.	"Amen!"	Post Human: Nex Gen	4:31
7.	"(Interlude) Project Angel Dust"		1:16
8.	"Kool-Aid"	Post Human: Nex Gen	4:08
9.	"Shadow Moses"	Sempiternal	5:04
10.	"[OST] (Spi)ritual"	Post Human: Nex Gen	2:34
11.	"N/A"	Post Human: Nex Gen	3:24
12.	"Sleepwalking"	Sempiternal	4:10
13.	"Itch for the Cure (When Will We Be Free?)"	Post Human: Survival Horror	2:33
14.	"Kingslayer"	Post Human: Survival Horror	3:40
15.	"Parasite Eve"	Post Human: Survival Horror	5:52
16.	"Follow You"	That's the Spirit	5:24
17.	"Lost"	Post Human: Nex Gen	4:54
18.	"Can You Feel My Heart"	Sempiternal	6:31
19.	"(Interlude) You People Are All Doomed"		2:51
20.	"Doomed"	That's the Spirit	4:34
21.	"(Interlude) Aura Gauger"		1:09
22.	"Drown"	That's the Spirit	3:55
23.	"Throne"	That's the Spirit	5:07
Total length:			89:45

=== Notes ===
- "Darkside" is stylised as "DArkSide"
- "Mantra" is stylised in all caps
- "Amen!" is stylised as "AmEN!" and includes recorded vocals from Lil Uzi Vert and Daryl Palumbo
- "[OST] (Spi)ritual" is stylised in lower case
- "N/A" is stylised as "n/A"
- "Kingslayer" includes recorded vocals from Babymetal
- "Lost" is stylised as "LosT"
- "(Interlude) You People Are All Doomed" consists mainly of "Overture: At the Earth's Curve", composed by Simon Dobson, from the band's 2016 live album "Live at the Royal Albert Hall"
- Physical copies of the album have the interludes listed as unnumbered tracks

== Personnel ==
Album credits adapted from Tidal, film credits adapted from the video's end credits.

=== Musicians ===
- Oli Sykes – lead vocals, director
- Lee Malia – lead guitar
- Matt Kean – bass
- Matt Nicholls – drums, drum machine
- John Jones – rhythm guitar, backing vocals, keyboards

=== Technical ===
- Zakk Cervini – additional production
- Nick "Spike" Jorden – recording engineer
- Jon Simcox – recording engineer
- Grant Copley – recording engineer
- Jared Daly – recording engineer, live mixing
- Ted Jensen – mastering engineer, mixing

=== Crew ===
- Circus Head – director
- Jumana Brinkley Abbas – producer
- Matt Ash – producer
- Daisy Blackford – producer
- Toby Johnson – production manager
- Christian Orkibi – motion graphics

== Charts ==
Chart performance for L.I.V.E. in São Paulo
Chart (2026)	Peak position
Australian Albums (ARIA)	19
Austrian Albums (Ö3 Austria)	5
Belgian Albums (Ultratop Flanders)	22
Belgian Albums (Ultratop Wallonia)	15
French Albums (SNEP)	59
French Rock & Metal Albums (SNEP)	2
German Albums (Offizielle Top 100)	6
German Rock & Metal Albums (Offizielle Top 100)	2
Japanese Western Albums (Oricon)	18
Polish Albums (ZPAV)	65
Scottish Albums (Official Charts)	10
Swedish Physical Albums (Sverigetopplistan)	18
Swiss Albums (Schweizer Hitparade)	25
UK Albums (Official Charts)	55
UK Rock & Metal Albums (Official Charts)	2
