= Lo-files =

Remix album by Bring Me the Horizon
- Released: 11 July 2025
- Genre: Lo-fi
- Length: 1:21:42
- Labels: RCA; Sony

Bring Me the Horizon chronology
Post Human: Nex Gen (2024)	Lo-files (2025)	L.I.V.E. in São Paulo (2026)

Lo-files is the second remix album by British rock band Bring Me the Horizon. It was released on 11 July 2025, through Sony Music. The album contains 23 remixes from five of the band's previous releases, including four from Sempiternal (2013), five from That's the Spirit (2015), three from Amo (2019), four from Post Human: Survival Horror (2020), and seven from Post Human: Nex Gen (2024).

== Background and release ==
Following the release of Post Human: Nex Gen in 2024, Sykes said in an interview with Kerrang! magazine that the band wanted to release music in 2025 but also said that he wanted to "put less pressure on myself, and not promise anything."

On 8 July 2025, following teasers via social media, the band announced they would be releasing a lo-fi remix album containing 23 reimaginations of their songs later that week. The album was then released on 11 July, featuring collaborations from well-known lo-fi artists such as Casiio, No Spirit, Lophiile, and drxnk.

Describing the album as "utility music", Sykes spoke about the choice behind doing a lo-fi album stating:

"The original idea for our 'go-to' record was actually something more chill, a record you could put on while studying or zoning out. It ended up way more chaotic than I originally intended. So I guess this is another attempt at creating something lowkey. I listen to a lot of lo-fi when I'm working or feeling anxious, so I hope this record can do the same for others."

In 2026, a limited edition two-record vinyl version of the album was released for Record Store Day.

== Critical reception ==
Professional ratings
Review scores
Source	Rating
Kerrang!	4/5

Writing for Kerrang!, James Hingle called the album "the most unhinged, genius and weirdly soothing curveball" the band had released, stating it was "perfect for just chilling out and vibing." He also went on to praise the band's bravery for stepping into a new genre, stating that the band were "never afraid of headed into uncharted waters."

== Track listing ==
All music is composed by Bring Me the Horizon.

Lo-files track listing
No.	Title	Original release	Length
1.	"Can You Feel My Heart"	Sempiternal	2:43
2.	"Youtopia"	Post Human: Nex Gen	4:50
3.	"In the Dark"	Amo	3:08
4.	"Follow You"	That's the Spirit	3:30
5.	"Darkside"	Post Human: Nex Gen	3:08
6.	"Kingslayer"	Post Human: Survival Horror	3:03
7.	"Sleepwalking"	Sempiternal	4:25
8.	"Drown"	That's the Spirit	3:25
9.	"Lost"	Post Human: Nex Gen	3:28
10.	"Seen It All Before"	Sempiternal	3:28
11.	"Parasite Eve"	Post Human: Survival Horror	3:15
12.	"Medicine"	Amo	5:09
13.	"Kool-Aid"	Post Human: Nex Gen	3:18
14.	"Dig It"	Post Human: Nex Gen	3:45
15.	"Doomed"	That's the Spirit	3:39
16.	"Avalanche"	That's the Spirit	4:20
17.	"One Day the Only Butterflies Left Will Be in Your Chest as You March Towards Your Death"	Post Human: Survival Horror	3:27
18.	"Strangers"	Post Human: Nex Gen	3:05
19.	"1x1"	Post Human: Survival Horror	4:22
20.	"Shadow Moses"	Sempiternal	2:47
21.	"Mother Tongue"	Amo	4:04
22.	"Die4U"	Post Human: Nex Gen	3:21
23.	"Throne"	That's the Spirit	2:02
Total length:			1:21:42

=== Notes ===
- All tracks are stylised as filenames, with various uses of lower case, camel case, snake case, and leetspeak. (Note: Track stylings: 1. "canyoufeelmy<3.tmpx"; 2. "(U)topia.drm"; 3. "in_the_dark.ech"; 4. "followU.bnd"; 5. "Darkside.verXx"; 6. "king_sl@yer.fmk"; 7. "sL33pwalking.idl"; 8. "drwn.vvv"; 9. "losT_404.nll"; 10. "seenitallbefore_xx.arch"; 11. "parasite.ev3"; 12. "med!cine.fbk"; 13. "koolaid.xxo"; 14. "d1g_it.core"; 15. "DOOMED.errX"; 16. "avalanche_.drft"; 17. "1DayTheOnlyButterfliesLeftWillBInurChestAsuMarchTowards UrDeath.finx"; 18. "sTr4nG3r5.vsn0"; 19. "1×1.syncd"; 20. "shadowm0ses.frq"; 21. "m0th3r.tng"; 22. "DiE4u.sysrsk"; 23. "Throne.GOD")

== Personnel ==
Credits only include remixers, and adapted from Tidal. For original song credits, see original song or album article.

Remixers

- Casiio (1, 5, 23)
- No Spirit (1, 5, 23)
- Lophiile (2, 7, 12, 16, 19)
- Kanisan (3, 10)
- Dimension 32 (4, 8, 18)
- Mondo Loops (6, 11, 20)
- Drxnk (9, 13, 15, 17, 21)
- HM Surf (14, 22)

Additional personnel

- Vinne Art – artwork

== Charts ==
Chart performance
Chart (2025)	Peak position
Australian Albums (ARIA)	91
UK Album Downloads (Official Charts)	34

== Release history ==
Region	Date	Format	Label	Ref.
Various	11 July 2025	Digital download; streaming	Sony; RCA	
UK	18 April 2026	2 × vinyl	Sony; RCA	
