= Amen! (song) =

Single by Bring Me the Horizon featuring Lil Uzi Vert and Daryl Palumbo

from the album Post Human: Nex Gen
- Released: 1 June 2023
- Recorded: 2022–2023
- Genre: Nu metal; rap metal; metalcore; post-hardcore
- Length: 3:10
- Label: Sony; RCA
- Songwriters: Oli Sykes; Lee Malia; Jordan Fish; Zakk Cervini
- Producers: Zakk Cervini; Evil Twin

Bring Me the Horizon singles chronology
"Wish I Could Forget" (2023)	"Amen!" (2023)	"Code Mistake" (2023)

Lil Uzi Vert singles chronology
"Watch This" (2023)	"Amen!" (2023)	"Endless Fashion" (2023)

Daryl Palumbo singles chronology
"The Bronze Jade" (2023)	"Amen!" (2023)	"Message Like a Bomb" (2023)

Music video
- "Amen!" on YouTube

"Amen!" (stylised as "AmEN!") is a song by British rock band Bring Me the Horizon, featuring Lil Uzi Vert and Daryl Palumbo of Glassjaw. Written by vocalist Oli Sykes, guitarist Lee Malia, keyboardist Jordan Fish, and producer Zakk Cervini, it was produced by Cervini and Evil Twin. The song was released on 1 June 2023, through Sony Records and RCA Records, and was the fourth single for the band's seventh studio album, Post Human: Nex Gen, as well as the penultimate to feature Fish, who departed from the band in December 2023.

== Background and release ==
The song was mostly recorded in 2022, having been nearly complete by August of that year, but was only finished in May 2023. A week after recording was complete, the song was released on 1 June 2023, and would have been the last single released before the release of Post Human: Nex Gen before its original intended release date of 15 September, which was announced a week after "Amen!" was released. However, in August, the band announced the album had been delayed.

Sykes noted that the song was inspired by "cancel culture, justice porn, and this very volatile society we've made", having stepped away from posting online. The band ironically promoted the song as the "feel good song of the summer".

== Music video ==
The music video was released on 23 June 2023, and was directed by Weston Allen. The video depicts a cult ritual, with the band dressed in hippie-style clothing, with flashing lights and psychedelic imagery, which the band also promoted ironically as the "blockbuster hit for the summer, fun for all the family."

== Live performances ==
The song debuted live the same day it released, 1 June 2023, in Budapest, during the Post Human European Tour.

== Composition ==
Described as the opposite of their previous release, "Lost", which was noted for its emo influences, "Amen!" has further been described as nu metal, rap metal, metalcore, and post-hardcore.

== Personnel ==
Credits are adapted from Tidal.

Bring Me the Horizon

- Oli Sykes – lead vocals, composition, lyrics
- Matt Nicholls – drums
- Lee Malia – guitars, composition
- Matt Kean – bass
- Jordan Fish – programming, backing vocals, composition

Additional musicians

- Lil Uzi Vert – guest vocals
- Daryl Palumbo (Glassjaw) – guest vocals

Additional personnel

- Zakk Cervini – production, mastering, mixing, programming, composition, lyrics
- Evil Twin – production
- Daidai – additional production
- Deathnyann – additional production
- Daisuke – additional production
- Misstiq – additional production
- Ben Thomas – engineering
- Guillermo Rodriguez – engineering
- Nik Trekov – engineering assistance
- Alissic – artwork

== Charts ==
Chart performance for "Amen!"
Chart (2023)	Peak position
Australia Digital Tracks (ARIA)	48
New Zealand Hot Singles (RMNZ)	35
UK Singles Sales (OCC)	43
US Hot Rock & Alternative Songs (Billboard)	42
