= Strangers (Bring Me the Horizon song) =

2022 single by Bring Me the Horizon

Single by Bring Me the Horizon

from the album Post Human: Nex Gen
- Released: 6 July 2022
- Recorded: November 2021 - 2022
- Genre: Pop-punk; alternative rock; pop rock; hard rock; emo
- Length: 3:15
- Label: Sony; RCA
- Songwriters: Oliver Sykes; Jordan Fish; Lee Malia; Caroline Ailin; BloodPop
- Producers: Zakk Cervini; BloodPop; Evil Twin

Bring Me the Horizon singles chronology
"Bad Life" (2022)	"Strangers" (2022)	"Lost" (2023)

Music video
- "Strangers" on YouTube

"Strangers" (stylised as "sTraNgeRs") is a song by British rock band Bring Me the Horizon. Produced by Zakk Cervini, BloodPop and Evil Twin, it was released as the second single from the band's seventh studio album Post Human: Nex Gen on 6 July 2022.

== Promotion and release ==
On 27 May 2022, the band unveiled an edited version of "Strangers" for the first time during a DJ set at their Malta Weekender Festival. The band were originally meant to release the single prior to the festival but were unable to due to not being able to shoot a music video in time. On 22 June, they formally announced the official release date of "Strangers" for 6 July 2022. On the day of the song's release, "Strangers" was premiered on BBC Radio 1 during Clara Amfo's "Future Sounds" segment as the "Hottest Record" ahead of the music video being released an hour later.

== Composition and lyrics ==
"Strangers" has been described by critics as pop-punk, alternative rock, pop rock, hard rock, and an emo song. The song was written by the band's lead vocalist Oliver Sykes, keyboardist Jordan Fish, guitarist Lee Malia, Caroline Ailin and BloodPop, while it was produced by Zakk Cervini, BloodPop and Evil Twin. The song touches on the different kinds of trauma in its lyrical content and how Sykes wanted to use that to bring people with mental health problems together. Sykes also wrote the song about the refugees during the Russian invasion of Ukraine, comparing the parallels between their experiences and his during rehab about the struggles in different walks of life. Sykes explained his thought process on how the song came together:

"The song came out of a long writing trip in LA, and as soon as the lyric 'we're just a room full of strangers' came it took on such a deeper double meaning – how it would feel to be performing it live as that's what it is.. all strangers connecting on this mad level.. and that it was like rehab. Coming out of lockdown and the pandemic, everyone is recovering from something and I'm so aware that so many people struggle daily with differing traumas, and just wanted to stress that they're not in this alone… and we're a community here to help each other."

In an interview with Maniacs, Fish expressed his feelings about what "Strangers" meant to him and the band in terms of the importance of their musical progression:

"Writing Strangers didn't feel like just writing another song, it felt like writing the most important song of our career and it felt like that on the last one and the one before that. We have that feeling all of the time. We don't want to drop a shit song. We don't want someone to say "oh that sounds like a boring progression". We do try and push it forward, because we care about the band and what we're putting out."

== Music video ==
The official music video for "Strangers" was premiered on YouTube one hour after the single was released on 6 July 2022. The video was directed by Thomas James, marking this the first time Sykes hasn't had music video directorial duties since "Mother Tongue".

The band asked fans to anonymously share their own personal struggles and stories that the band used to inspire the disturbing narrative and visuals that transpire in the music video. The music video for "Strangers" features disturbing visuals of people being overtaken by alien-like viruses in desolated warehouses, suffering in pain while their faces are being horrifically mutated into contorted figures. The band perform the song simultaneously as the video alternates between the various scenes. Revolver compared the video to the likes of a Saw film crossed with Alien. The video was also noted of taking inspiration from the classic dark rock videos of the 1990s.

== Personnel ==
Credits adapted from Tidal.

Bring Me the Horizon

- Oliver Sykes – lead vocals, composition, lyrics
- Matt Nicholls – drums
- Lee Malia – guitars, composition, lyrics
- Matt Kean – bass
- Jordan Fish – keyboards, programming, percussion, backing vocals, engineering, composition, lyrics

Additional personnel

- Zakk Cervini – production, mixing
- BloodPop – production, composition, lyrics
- Evil Twin – production
- Ted Jensen – mastering
- Caroline Ailin – composition, lyrics
- Nik Trekov – production assistant
- Choir Noir – choir

== Charts ==
=== Weekly charts ===
Weekly chart performance for "Strangers"
Chart (2022)	Peak position
Australia Digital Tracks (ARIA)	32
Czech Republic Airplay (ČNS IFPI)	53
Germany Rock Airplay (Official German Charts)	5
Italy Airplay (FIMI)	72
New Zealand Hot Singles (RMNZ)	36
UK Singles (OCC)	60
UK Rock & Metal (OCC)	6
US Hot Rock & Alternative Songs (Billboard)	28
US Rock & Alternative Airplay (Billboard)	29

=== Year-end charts ===
Year-end chart performance for "Strangers"
Chart (2022)	Position
US Hot Hard Rock Songs (Billboard)	27
US Mainstream Rock (Billboard)	46

== Certifications ==
Certifications for "Strangers"
Region	Certification	Certified units/sales
Brazil (Pro-Música Brasil)	Gold	20,000^{‡}
United Kingdom (BPI)	Silver	200,000^{‡}
^{‡} Sales+streaming figures based on certification alone.
