= Lost (Bring Me the Horizon song) =

2023 single by Bring Me the Horizon

Single by Bring Me the Horizon

from the album Post Human: Nex Gen
- Released: 4 May 2023
- Recorded: September – October 2022
- Genre: Pop-punk; emo pop; hyperpop; pop rock; alternative rock
- Length: 3:25
- Label: Sony; RCA
- Songwriters: Oliver Sykes; Jordan Fish; Lee Malia; Matt Kean; Matt Nicholls
- Producers: Zakk Cervini; Evil Twin

Bring Me the Horizon singles chronology
"Strangers" (2022)	"Lost" (2023)	"Wish I Could Forget" (2023)

Music video
- "Lost" on YouTube

"Lost" (stylised as "LosT") is a song by British rock band Bring Me the Horizon. Produced by Zakk Cervini and Evil Twin, it was released as the third single from the band's seventh studio album Post Human: Nex Gen on 4 May 2023.

== Promotion and release ==
In February 2023, drummer Matt Nicholls revealed during an interview with Impericon that the band had written and recorded new material for their highly anticipated second Post Human release in their built-in studio on the back of their tourbus during their North American Tour in September and October 2022, saying that he hoped that a new single would be released "pretty soon." At the end of March 2023, the band released an episodic YouTube series of their February 2023 European headline tour which also teased new music with various new soundclips being showcased throughout the series. On 19 April, after the series had concluded, the band released a social media teaser and announced a brand new single entitled "Lost", scheduled to be released on 4 May 2023. On the day of the singles' release, the song was premiered worldwide during Clara Amfo's "Hottest Record of the Day" segment on BBC Radio 1. The song was debuted live for the first time in June 2023 on their European Tour at the Papp László Budapest Sportaréna in Budapest, Hungary.

== Composition and lyrics ==
"Lost" has been described by critics as a pop punk, emo pop, hyperpop, pop rock, and an alternative rock song. Many critics noted how "Lost" felt inspired by My Chemical Romance, which Sykes also cited as one of the main inspirations behind the track as well as The Strokes.

When speaking to Clara Amfo on BBC Radio 1, Sykes explained about how excited he felt to release "Lost" compared to the previous single "Strangers":

"I don't wanna sound negative, but it was the least excited I've been about releasing a song, just because it didn't feel like the kind of song I wanted the world to hear yet, I think ["Lost"] encapsulates exactly how I imagine this next album or EP or whatever you want to call it, is going to sound like, it is a really good representation of how I imagine this record to be."

Sykes also later added that he felt the song was "more honest" and compared it to a therapy session with himself. In an interview with Kerrang!, Fish explained why the band chose "Lost" as the third single for Post Human: Nex Gen.

"Usually on the singles we're looking for something that'll help people who don't necessarily like our band – or know our band – engage with it. That's part of the reason, I know it's not a particularly artistic one, but catchy songs end up being singles. Compared to "Die4U" and "Strangers", it's very emo-y feeling. That's kind of one of the themes of the record musically, it goes a bit more there compared to the other two. It's a bit more fun and upbeat compared to other songs we've done. Both "Die4U" and "Strangers" are more like ballads, so doing something a bit more upbeat and fun was cool. It was either that or do something slightly heavier, and we've got some heavier stuff coming on the rest of the record, so it felt like a good thing to drop now. We'll see if we're right!"

== Awards and nominations ==
Awards and nominations for "Lost"
Organisation	Year	Category	Result	Ref.
UK Music Video Awards	2023	Best UK Rock Video	Nominated	

== Music video ==
The music video for "Lost" was released an hour after the single was released on 4 May 2023, directed by Jensen Noen and frontman Oli Sykes. The video was filmed in Los Angeles, California

The video is set inside a hospital where Sykes plays a patient who goes on a rampage, after nearly undergoing brain surgery. The video showcases many visuals of gore and bloodshed, which resulted in the song getting age-restricted on YouTube. The music video for "Lost" was shot over the course of three days and also features a cameo by Thomas Ian Nicholas of American Pie fame. Nicholas was invited to the shoot due to being friends with one of the producers and being keen to take part in the video. Sykes explained that he was initially oblivious to the appearance, only recognising him when he turned up to the video shoot and said: "Wait a minute, is that Kevin from American Pie?", later referring to the cameo as "pure luck".

In an interview with Promonews, Noen explained what it was like working with Sykes on the music video:

"This is such an important milestone for me personally to get to work with the artist who I have been a fan of since 2009. The band grew, evolved, and changed before my very eyes throughout my life and was always one of the few bands in the world beyond respected by me for pushing the boundaries of heavy music and consistently creating something new and unique. Having the opportunity to get to know and work with Oli Sykes and witnessing how he cares about every detail, his perfectionism, and his creativity was truly inspiring. I'm super grateful for not only the opportunity to work together but for a chance to try something new and step out of my creative 'comfort zone'."

== In popular culture ==
- "Lost" is featured in the soundtrack for the 2023 video game NHL 24.
- When the band won the BRIT Award for the Best British Rock/Alternative Act in 2024, "Lost" was played over their acceptance for the award.

== Personnel ==
Credits adapted from Tidal.

Bring Me the Horizon

- Oliver Sykes – lead vocals, composition, lyrics
- Matt Nicholls – drums, composition, lyrics
- Lee Malia – guitars, composition, lyrics
- Matt Kean – bass, composition, lyrics
- Jordan Fish – keyboards, programming, percussion, backing vocals, engineering, composition, lyrics

Additional personnel

- Zakk Cervini – production, mixing, mastering, programming
- Evil Twin – production
- Nik Trekov – production assistant
- Tracey Brakes - additional production
- Lonelyspeck - additional production

== Charts ==
=== Weekly charts ===
Weekly chart performance for "Lost"
Chart (2023–24)	Peak position
Australia Digital Tracks (ARIA)	15
Australia New Music (ARIA)	19
Austria (Ö3 Austria Top 40)	58
Canada Digital Songs (Billboard)	38
Germany Rock Airplay (GfK)	22
Italy Airplay (FIMI)	83
New Zealand Hot Singles (RMNZ)	10
UK Singles (OCC)	29
UK Rock & Metal (OCC)	1
US Hot Rock & Alternative Songs (Billboard)	22
US Rock Airplay (Billboard)	27

=== Year-end charts ===
Year-end chart performance for "Lost"
Chart (2023)	Position
US Hot Hard Rock Songs (Billboard)	20

== Certifications ==
Certifications for "Lost"
Region	Certification	Certified units/sales
Brazil (Pro-Música Brasil)	Gold	20,000^{‡}
United Kingdom (BPI)	Silver	200,000^{‡}
^{‡} Sales+streaming figures based on certification alone.
