= Limousine (Bring Me the Horizon song) =

Song by Bring Me the Horizon featuring Aurora

from the album Post Human: Nex Gen
- Released: 24 May 2024
- Length: 4:11
- Label: Sony; RCA; Columbia
- Songwriters: Oli Sykes; Lee Malia; Matt Nicholls; Aurora Aksnes; Zakk Cervini; Daisuke Ehara; Andrew Goldstein; Dan Lancaster
- Producers: Zakk Cervini; Dan Lancaster; Oli Sykes

Lyric video
- "Limousine" on YouTube

"Limousine" (stylised as "liMOusIne") is a song by British rock band Bring Me the Horizon, featuring Norwegian singer-songwriter Aurora. Written by vocalist Oli Sykes, guitarist Lee Malia, drummer Matt Nicholls, Aurora, Zakk Cervini, Daisuke Ehara, Andrew Goldstein, and Dan Lancaster, it was produced by Cervini, Lancaster, and Sykes. The fifth track on the band's seventh studio album Post Human: Nex Gen released in May 2024, the song was not released as a single, but reached number 57 on the UK Singles Chart and number seven on the UK Rock & Metal Singles Chart.

== Background ==
Following a comment left on an Instagram post by Billie Eilish by Sykes in January 2024, fans speculated a collaboration between the two was in the works. Also in January, during a performance on the band's NX_GN UK tour in Cardiff, the band revealed titles and snippets of several songs from their upcoming seventh studio album, Post Human: Nex Gen. Fans noted that Sykes' comment, simply the word "limousine", was one of these song titles, and also noted on Eilish's love for heavy music, leading to speculation Eilish would feature on the track.

Following the album's release on 24 May 2024, it was revealed that the track instead featured Aurora. The following week, Sykes addressed the rumors in an interview with BBC Radio 1's Daniel P. Carter; he mentioned that he had heard that Eilish's photographer was a fan of their's and that they had spoke about the two collaborating on a song. Sykes sent an unfinished version of the song to Eilish but never received a response, which led to his Instagram comment which he later described as "embarrassing" as he "knew the chance of Billie doing a song with us was slim to none".

In an interview with NME, Sykes said that Aurora was the "person that helped elevate the song to something that feels exotic and different" and commented on his admiration of her lyrical style compared to other pop artists, and said that she "is a real person who dares to speak what they believe in, who gives a shit about the world". He also noted in the BBC interview that Aurora was "one of my first choices" for the song as he knew she was a fan, though initially she didn't respond and the band had found someone else for the song, but this was cancelled when Aurora did eventually respond, with Sykes commenting he hopes to collaborate with the other artist in the future. During Glastonbury Festival 2024, Aurora was interviewed by NME and spoke about the song, noting that she is a fan of metal music and Bring Me the Horizon, and when Sykes reached out the two were enthusiastic to collaborate.

== Live performances ==
The song debuted live with Aurora on 17 August 2024 in Osaka, and was performed again the following night at the Zozo Marine Stadium in Chiba, Japan, during the band's NX_GN World Tour and the 2024 Summer Sonic festival. The song was performed live in Kuala Lumpur and Jakarta the following week. In September 2024, the band released a live performance video of the Chiba performance.

== Composition and lyrics ==
The song has frequently compared to the sound of Deftones, with Sykes himself also commenting on the band's influence, calling it "almost to a point of parody".

The song's lyrics delve into repetitive habits and "the simple choice of an instant high". During the BBC Radio 1 interview with Daniel P. Carter, Sykes and Carter explored the themes of the song, such as drug use and waking up from "the matrix", with Sykes commenting on its comparison to a previous track on the record, "Youtopia":

"It's like the duality to that song [Youtopia], it is the other side of the coin, it's a song all about just going, "you know what, I'm just gonna take the quick buzz. I'm not gonna go down the long hard path of self-love and working on myself [...] I choose over-stimulation because I know the other way is gonna be more difficult." [...] It's something I've struggled with my whole entire life, [...] it's a constant battle for me everyday not to go down that route, but when I do go down that route, by the end of the day I'm not happy."

Sykes spoke further, comparing the inspirations to themes of self-worthiness and relationship goals, calling it a "very relatable and universal problem".

== Personnel ==
Credits are adapted from Tidal.

Bring Me the Horizon

- Oli Sykes – lead vocals, production, programming, composition, lyrics
- Matt Nicholls – drums, composition
- Lee Malia – guitars, composition
- Matt Kean – bass

Additional musicians

- Aurora – guest vocals, composition

Additional personnel

- Dan Lancaster – production, programming, composition
- Zakk Cervini – production, mixing, composition
- Julian Gargiulo – engineering, additional production
- Daidai – additional production
- Jason Inguagiato – additional engineering

== Charts ==
Chart performance for "Limousine"
Chart (2024)	Peak position
New Zealand Hot Singles (RMNZ)	17
UK Singles (Official Charts)	57
UK Rock & Metal (Official Charts)	7
US Hot Rock & Alternative Songs (Billboard)	48
