= Top 10 Statues That Cried Blood =

2024 single by Bring Me the Horizon

Single by Bring Me the Horizon

from the album Post Human: Nex Gen
- Released: 5 June 2024
- Genre: Pop-punk; emo; post-hardcore; pop rock
- Length: 3:42 (single version); 4:00 (album version)
- Label: Sony; RCA
- Songwriters: Oliver Sykes; Lee Malia; Matt Nicholls; Dan Lancaster; Zakk Cervini; Daisuke Ehara; RJ Pasin
- Producers: Oliver Sykes; Dan Lancaster; Zakk Cervini

Bring Me the Horizon singles chronology
"Kool-Aid" (2024)	"Top 10 Statues That Cried Blood" (2024)	"Wonderwall" (2025)

Music video
- "Top 10 Statues That Cried Blood" on YouTube

"Top 10 Statues That Cried Blood" (stylised as "Top 10 staTues tHat CriEd bloOd") is a song by English rock band Bring Me the Horizon. Produced by frontman Oli Sykes, Dan Lancaster and Zakk Cervini, it was released as the seventh and final single from their seventh studio album, Post Human: Nex Gen on 5 June 2024.

== Composition and lyrics ==
"Top 10 Statues That Cried Blood" has been described as pop-punk, emo, pop rock, and post-hardcore. The song was written by the band's lead vocalist Oliver Sykes, lead guitarist Lee Malia, drummer Matt Nicholls, Dan Lancaster, Zakk Cervini, Daisuke Ehara and RJ Pasin, while it was produced by Sykes, Lancaster and Cervini. The songs themes deal with trauma, pain, and self-acceptance. Lyrically, the track explores personal struggles and confronting demons, inviting that vulnerability to be able to overcome them. In an interview with Rolling Stone, Sykes alluded to the track being about the responsibility one has to take for their own self-healing, further elaborating:

"Everyone who decides to go on a path of self-improvement, or is on the path of being an addict, they’re going to relapse, they’re going to fall. Without a doubt, everyone does it. No one goes, ‘I’m going to fix myself,’ and they fix themselves first time."

== Music video ==
The music video for "Top 10 Statues That Cried Blood" was directed by Harry Lindley; it was released on 5 June 2024.

The music video for "Top 10 Statues Tha Cried Blood" is set inside a futuristic warehouse. The video borrows elements from sci-fi, being heavily inspired by the film franchises: Star Wars, Blade Runner, Dune and Tron, as well as the video game Cyberpunk 2077 (2020). The video involves a rave with dancing robots, motorbikes speeding around the venue, and a warrior couple having a heavily choreographed lightsaber fight, while the biomechanically engineered band perform the song on an elevated platform above the dancefloor. The video also has a subplot involving a telepathic girl and a cute robot companion named R-8 who roam the warehouse, now abandoned, at a later date, discovering the events as they take place throughout the music video. The subplot is directly referenced on the album cover art for Post Human: Nex Gen.

Speaking about the music video, Sykes explained:

"The video continues the exploration of what it means to be human in an age where technology can alter our very nature and gives keen eyed fans more lore to dive into and discuss on their quest for uncovering the full post human lore."

The music video was described as "blockbuster-eqsue" by Megan Louise-Burnham of Music Is To Blame, elaborating: "Complete with lightsaber choreography and a rave fitting for a Matrix film, it really does speak to the imagination and creativity of the band." Kerrang! writer Emily Carter described the video as an "epic video treatment, helping once again to bring Oli Sykes’ incredible artistic vision to life in a hugely ambitious way."

== Charts ==
=== Weekly charts ===
Weekly chart performance for "Top 10 Statues That Cried Blood"
Chart (2024)	Peak position
Italy Rock Airplay (FIMI)	23
New Zealand Hot Singles (RMNZ)	13
UK Singles (OCC)	41
UK Rock & Metal (OCC)	2
US Hot Rock & Alternative Songs (Billboard)	37
US Rock Airplay (Billboard)	14

=== Year-end charts ===
Year-end chart performance for "Top 10 Statues That Cried Blood"
Chart (2024)	Position
US Hot Hard Rock Songs (Billboard)	18
US Mainstream Rock (Billboard)	23
