= Darkside (Bring Me the Horizon song) =

Single by Bring Me the Horizon

from the album Post Human: Nex Gen
- Released: 13 October 2023
- Genre: Nu metal; pop metal; alternative metal; alternative rock; emo
- Length: 2:44
- Label: Sony; RCA
- Songwriters: Oli Sykes; Jordan Fish; Lee Malia; Matt Nicholls; Andrew Goldstein; Zakk Cervini; Gianni Taylor
- Producers: Sykes; Cervini; Daidai

Bring Me the Horizon singles chronology
| "Code Mistake" (2023) | "Darkside" (2023) | "Kool-Aid" (2024) |

"Darkside" (stylised as "DArkSide") is a song by British rock band Bring Me the Horizon. Produced by frontman Oli Sykes, Zakk Cervini and DaiDai, it was released as the fifth single from their seventh studio album, Post Human: Nex Gen on 13 October 2023. It is the last single to feature keyboardist, songwriter and producer Jordan Fish, as he departed the band in December 2023.

== Promotion and release ==
On 9 October 2023, the band sent an email to fans on their mailing list about a newly titled song "Darkside", alongside some lyrics "Think my angels fallen" as well as the release date. The band kept teasing the song on social media, posting snippets on Discord and TikTok, until they released "Darkside" on 13 October. The song was debuted live for the first time in October 2023 at NexFest while playing at the World Kinen Hall in Kobe, Japan.

== Composition and lyrics ==
"Darkside" has been described by critics as a nu metal, pop metal, alternative metal, alternative rock, and an emo song. The song was written by the band's lead vocalist Oli Sykes, keyboardist Jordan Fish, guitarist Lee Malia, drummer Matt Nicholls, Andrew Goldstein, Zakk Cervini and Gianni Taylor; while produced by Sykes, Cervini and DaiDai. "Darkside" deals with tackling themes of depression, insomnia, heartbreak and the "fear of going to a darker place". The song showcases the group's lighter and poppier side than their previous releases. The rhythm of the song's verses has many similarities to the choruses of Sum 41's song "Still Waiting".

== Critical reception ==
Eli Enis of Revolver stated, "Its chorus is absolutely anthemic, while the verses have bouncy nu-metal riffs and a delivery from Sykes that evokes Linkin Park." Tyler Lubke of Wall of Sound described the track "groovy" and "appealing radio rock." He remarked, "Vocalist Oli Sykes utilises his fundamental screams and singing throughout the catchy chorus and quieter verses as the band masterfully infuses their blend of electronic influences alongside nifty drum beats and ramping guitars."

== In popular culture ==
- "Darkside" was used as the official theme song for WWE's NXT Vengeance Day event in 2024.

== Personnel ==
Credits for "Darkside" adapted from Tidal.

Bring Me the Horizon

- Oli Sykes – lead vocals, composition, lyrics, production
- Matt Nicholls – drums, composition
- Lee Malia – guitars, composition
- Matt Kean – bass
- Jordan Fish – programmer, composition

Additional personnel

- Zakk Cervini – production, composition, lyrics, programmer, mixing, mastering
- Julian Gargiulo – additional production, mixing
- Gianni Taylor – additional production, composition, backing vocals
- Daidai – production

== Charts ==
=== Weekly charts ===
Weekly chart performance for "Darkside"
| Chart (2023–24) | Peak position |
|---|---|
| Australia Digital Tracks (ARIA) | 23 |
| Finland (Suomen virallinen lista) | 68 |
| Germany Rock Airplay (Official German Charts) | 9 |
| Italy Airplay (FIMI) | 80 |
| New Zealand Hot Singles (RMNZ) | 17 |
| UK Singles (Official Charts) | 31 |
| UK Rock & Metal (Official Charts) | 2 |
| US Hot Rock & Alternative Songs (Billboard) | 42 |

=== Year-end charts ===
Year-end chart performance for "Darkside"
| Chart (2024) | Position |
|---|---|
| US Hot Hard Rock Songs (Billboard) | 28 |

== Certifications ==
Certifications for "Darkside"
| Region | Certification | Certified units/sales |
|---|---|---|
| Brazil (Pro-Música Brasil) | Gold | 20,000^{‡} |
| United Kingdom (BPI) | Silver | 200,000^{‡} |
^{‡} Sales+streaming figures based on certification alone.

== Release history ==
Release history for "Darkside"
| Region | Date | Format | Label | Ref. |
|---|---|---|---|---|
| Various | 13 October 2023 | Digital download; streaming | Sony; RCA | |
| Italy | 20 October 2023 | Airplay | Sony Music Italy | |
