= Kool-Aid (song) =

2024 single by Bring Me the Horizon

Single by Bring Me the Horizon

from the album Post Human: Nex Gen
- Released: 5 January 2024
- Genre: Metalcore
- Length: 3:48
- Label: Sony; RCA
- Songwriters: Oliver Sykes; Dan Lancaster; Zakk Cervini; Lee Malia; Matt Nicholls; Dai Dai
- Producers: Dan Lancaster; Zakk Cervini; Oliver Sykes

Bring Me the Horizon singles chronology
"Darkside" (2023)	"Kool-Aid" (2024)	"Top 10 Statues That Cried Blood" (2024)

Music video
- "Kool-Aid" on YouTube

"Kool-Aid" is a song by British rock band Bring Me the Horizon. Produced by the band's vocalist Oliver Sykes, Dan Lancaster and Zakk Cervini, it was released as the sixth single from their seventh studio album, Post Human: Nex Gen, on 5 January 2024.

It is the first single by the band released since the departure of keyboardist, co-primary songwriter and producer Jordan Fish in December 2023.

== Promotion and release ==
On 22 December 2023, the band announced that longtime keyboardist Jordan Fish had amicably departed the band. In the following statement, the band stated that Post Human: Nex Gen and the subsequent UK tour in January 2024 was still slated to go ahead, while simultaneously promising that new music was coming "very soon". Not long after, lead vocalist Oli Sykes would tease a snippet of a new song called "Kool-Aid" on his Instagram story. On 2 January 2024, the band officially confirmed "Kool-Aid" as the sixth single for the new record, they announced the following day that the song would be released on 5 January. They debuted the song live for the first time on their opening UK tour date at the Utilita Arena in Cardiff, Wales on 9 January.

== Composition and lyrics ==
"Kool-Aid" has been described by critics as a metalcore song.

== Personnel ==
Bring Me the Horizon

- Oliver Sykes – lead vocals, production, composition, lyrics
- Matt Nicholls – drums, composition
- Lee Malia – guitars, backing vocals, composition
- Matt Kean – bass

Additional personnel

- Dan Lancaster – production, composition
- Zakk Cervini – production, composition, mastering, mixing, programming
- Julian Gargiulo – additional production, mixing, engineering
- Dai Dai – additional production, composition
- Phil Gornell – engineering assistant
- Lucy Landry – backing vocals

== Music video ==
The music video storyline for "Kool-Aid", directed by Jensen Noen & the band performance by Masaki Watanabe, was released on 28 February 2024.

== Charts ==
=== Weekly charts ===
Weekly chart performance for "Kool-Aid"
Chart (2024)	Peak position
Australia Digital Tracks (ARIA)	18
Germany Trending Singles (Official German Charts)	14
New Zealand Hot Singles (RMNZ)	5
UK Singles (Official Charts)	21
UK Rock & Metal (Official Charts)	1
US Hot Rock & Alternative Songs (Billboard)	25

=== Year-end charts ===
Year-end chart performance for "Kool-Aid"
Chart (2024)	Position
US Hot Hard Rock Songs (Billboard)	11

== Certifications ==
Certifications for "Kool-Aid"
Region	Certification	Certified units/sales
United Kingdom (BPI)	Silver	200,000^{‡}
^{‡} Sales+streaming figures based on certification alone.
