= Die4U =

2021 single by Bring Me the Horizon

Single by Bring Me the Horizon

from the album Post Human: Nex Gen
- Released: 16 September 2021
- Recorded: 2021
- Genre: Pop-punk; pop rock; alternative rock; hard rock; electronic rock; emo; post-hardcore
- Length: 3:27
- Label: Sony; RCA
- Songwriters: Oliver Sykes; Jordan Fish; BloodPop; Rami Yacoub; Madison Love
- Producers: BloodPop; Evil Twin

Bring Me the Horizon singles chronology
"Teardrops" (2020)	"Die4U" (2021)	"Bad Habits" (2022)

Music video
- "Die4U" on YouTube

"Die4U" (stylised as "DiE4u") is a song by British rock band Bring Me the Horizon. Produced by BloodPop and Evil Twin, it was released as the lead single from the band's seventh studio album Post Human: Nex Gen on 16 September 2021. The song peaked at number 5 on the Billboard Mainstream Rock Songs chart in February 2022.

"Die4U" was remixed by Six Impala, retitled as "Die6U" (stylised as "DiE6u"). The hyperpop remix was released on 17 December 2021.

== Promotion and release ==
On 2 September 2021, the band teased the new song on their social media platforms that they were working on along with cryptic teasers until they formally announced the release for the newly titled "Die4U" for 16 September 2021. Alongside this, they were promoting and inviting their fans to join "Club H3llh0le" for the same date, which would later be revealed as a teaser for the music video. Leading up to the release of the single, the band would relentlessly tease the same 20-second snippet of the song on all their social media platforms, most notably on TikTok. On the day of the single's release, the song made its worldwide debut on BBC Radio 1's Future Sounds show with Clara Amfo where "Die4U" was the hottest record of the day. The band performed the song on their upcoming September 2021 UK tour at all dates and later played "Die4U" in an acoustic format at the BBC Radio 1 Live Lounge on 30 September to promote the release of the single.

== Composition and lyrics ==
"Die4U" has been described by critics as a pop-punk, pop rock, alternative rock, hard rock, electronic rock, emo, and a post-hardcore song. The song was written by the band's lead vocalist Oliver Sykes, keyboardist Jordan Fish, BloodPop, Rami Yacoub and Madison Love, while it was produced by BloodPop and Evil Twin. "Die4U" was recorded remotely while Sykes was stuck in Brazil due to the lockdowns during the COVID-19 pandemic while Fish was in the UK with the rest of the band. The lyrics talk about the deals with addiction from the perspective of a toxic relationship. Sykes himself has experienced drug addiction in the past, saying that it "took away who he was" and nearly resulted in him ending his own life. He later found relief after attending rehab sessions, though disagrees with some of the principles used in his recovery. Musically, it is described by the front-man as "future emo." Sykes explained:

"I'm tackling the song as if this unhealthy obsession I have is a relationship – almost like a mistress, I've learned over the past year while I've been recovering that when you're in it, addiction is like you're having an affair. You're doing this thing behind everyone's back, it's a secret and it feels like you're cheating and betraying people. I never saw it in that way. I just thought I was harming myself and not other people. I didn't realise how much it can fuck up people's trust. This song is triumphant for me in a way because it's me finally accepting that I'm not someone who can drink alcohol, smoke weed or do any of these things because I just have a problem with it and it always goes down the same road. That's not something that I've been able to admit to myself. This song is a defiant stamp of me saying, 'No, I'm making a choice now. I can't keep doing this for the rest of my life because it's only going to end up one way'."

== Critical reception ==
Critics noted the song leaning more towards a pop oriented style compared to the nu metal sound from Post Human: Survival Horror. Writing for NME, Andrew Trendell wrote, "With 'DiE4u' retaining BMTH's trademark heaviness but driven by what could perhaps be their most pop-driven sound yet." Warren Litberg of Top Shelf pointed out how the song combined the extremes from both Count Your Blessings and Amo while also labelling it as a "great party song." Emily Harris of GSGMedia rated "Die4U" as a 4 out of 5, praising Sykes' vocal performances as a highlight as well as the lyrics, melody and the powerful refrain. Rock Sound writer, Jack Rogers, described the single as an "unstoppable force", explaining: "Melodically gripping, irresistibly slick, densely layered and beautifully dark, it's yet another triumph." Paul Brown of Wall of Sound while generally praising the track was also a bit more critical, labelling the song as "predictable", calling the lyrics "very safe" and comparing the song to the likes of The Amity Affliction.

Despite the mixed reception, the track won the 'Best Song' award at the 2022 Kerrang! Awards, beating out four other nominations in a reader vote. In doing so, "Die4U" became the first Bring Me the Horizon track to win the award, after three prior nominations.

== Music video ==
Bring Me the Horizon performing the song as they get drenched in blood raining from above.

The music video for "Die4U" was released shortly after the single was initially streamed. The video was directed by frontman and primary songwriter Oliver Sykes. It was shot in an abandoned warehouse in Kyiv, Ukraine which got a makeover to appear as a nightclub for vampires dubbed as "Club Hellhole". The video was noted by critics from taking inspiration from the Blade franchise.

Speaking about the music video in a behind the scenes video for the song on the band's YouTube channel. Sykes states:

"This video is special to me because A - it's the first thing I've done band wise apart from writing music after the pandemic, so it's been really cool and it's also like me getting a lot more confident in my directing abilities. This video, I kind of let myself go fucking crazy creatively and for me, making music videos is just like I'm getting to live my second passion because that's what I wanted to be when I were a kid like I wanted to be a director and I wanted to be a rockstar so like the fact that I'm now getting to do both now is like I'm incredibly lucky to do that."

The music video starts with a man and a woman walking up to a nightclub in a warehouse who speak Ukrainian when they get stopped by a bouncer to show forms of ID. The woman flashes up her wrist, revealing the single cover art for "Die4U" to the bouncer who then proceeds to let them into the club as the song starts. The man and the woman part ways as the band start to perform the song on stage in front of a bunch of partygoers in the club. The woman gets signalled over by a strange-looking mysterious vampire akin to a goblin who then proceeds to show him blood capsules in the briefcase that she was holding the entire time. During this time, it is slowly revealed to the man that this is no ordinary nightclub, but rather a nightclub filled with vampires as he's being pushed around by the partygoers as they then proceed to grab ahold of him as he's screaming. Just as the band are about to get to the bridge, the goblin looking vampire goes to grab one of the blood capsules but the woman pulls out a gun pointing it to his head before he can grab hold of a capsule. The band stops playing the song as the woman then gets held at gunpoint unexpectedly by a bunch of guests around her as tension arises. This would also reveal the same man from earlier who points a gun at her and reveals that he's was working undercover, before grinning and shooting an innocent partygoer. This starts an all-out massacre at the nightclub as people scream trying to escape. In the scramble, the goblin looking vampire also shoots at guests before then biting into the neck of the woman who screams. Another woman proceeds to repeatedly stab someone to death with a knife to the gut as tons of blood gushes over her face as she maniacally laughs. The man who is undercover then gets attacked by a bunch of vampires and eaten to death as the band start to perform the song again, resuming as the bridge starts. The band proceed to get soaked in a bloodbath of blood pouring over their heads as they get to the final chorus, resulting in a bloody rave and a visual of the frontman Oli Sykes also being confirmed as a vampire as the song ends.

== Personnel ==
Credits adapted from Tidal.

Bring Me the Horizon

- Oliver Sykes – lead vocals, composition, lyrics
- Lee Malia – guitars
- Jordan Fish – keyboards, programming, percussion, backing vocals, engineering, composition, lyrics
- Matt Kean – bass
- Matt Nicholls – drums

Additional personnel

- BloodPop – production, programming, composition, lyrics
- Zakk Cervini – mastering, mixing
- Evil Twin – production
- Gupi – misc production
- Nik Trekov – mixing assistant
- Madison Love – composition, lyrics
- Rami Yacoub – composition, lyrics

== Charts ==
=== Weekly charts ===
Weekly chart performance for "Die4U"
Chart (2021–24)	Peak position
Australia Digital Tracks (ARIA)	27
Germany Trending Singles (Official German Charts)	10
Japan Hot Overseas (Billboard)	20
New Zealand Hot Singles (RMNZ)	27
UK Singles (Official Charts)	41
UK Rock & Metal (Official Charts)	1
US Hot Rock & Alternative Songs (Billboard)	23
US Rock & Alternative Airplay (Billboard)	12

=== Year-end charts ===
2021 year-end chart performance for "Die4U"
Chart (2021)	Position
US Hot Hard Rock Songs (Billboard)	48

2022 year-end chart performance for "Die4U"
Chart (2022)	Position
US Hot Hard Rock Songs (Billboard)	22
US Rock Airplay (Billboard)	45
US Mainstream Rock (Billboard)	35
