= Youtopia (Bring Me the Horizon song) =

Song by Bring Me the Horizon

from the album Post Human: Nex Gen
- Released: 24 May 2024
- Genre: Pop-punk; alternative rock
- Length: 4:02
- Label: Sony; RCA; Columbia
- Songwriters: Oli Sykes; Lee Malia; Matt Nicholls; Zakk Cervini; Dan Lancaster; Daisuke Ehara; Sione Teumohenga
- Producers: Zakk Cervini; Dan Lancaster; Oli Sykes; Lee Malia

Lyric video
- "Youtopia" on YouTube

"Youtopia" (stylised as "YOUtopia") is a song by British rock band Bring Me the Horizon. Written by vocalist Oli Sykes, guitarist Lee Malia, drummer Matt Nicholls, Zakk Cervini, Dan Lancaster, Daisuke Ehara, and Sione Teumohenga, it was produced by Cervini, Lancaster, Sykes, and Malia. The second track on the band's seventh studio album Post Human: Nex Gen released in May 2024, the song was not released as a single, but reached number 50 on the UK Singles Chart and number six on the UK Rock & Metal Singles Chart.

== Background ==
During shows on the NX_GN UK tour, the band previewed snippets of songs from their upcoming album, Post Human: Nex Gen, with one titled "Scream". Upon the album's release on 24 May 2024, it was revealed that this was the working title for the song "Youtopia".

== Composition and lyrics ==
"Youtopia" has been described as pop-punk,, alternative rock, and has been likened to the sound of The Smashing Pumpkins.

Lyrically, the song is themed around mental health, specifically touching on personal growth, self-rejection, contentness, spirituality, and finding happiness.

Speaking about these themes in an interview with NME, Sykes stated "I'm still rejecting myself and not fully accepting who I am. It doesn't matter who you are or what you've been through in your life: you have to accept who you are. It's the first step of being happy" and said the song set the scene of the record's overall theme being a "battle between light and dark."

Sykes spoke further about the themes in an interview with BBC Radio 1's Daniel P. Carter, and also noted on restraint from drug use as a coping mechanism stating:

"It's so much more profound than the thing that we're all chasings right now, the happiness that we're seeking for is so skin deep, and there's so many things that I could do in my life and deprogram myself and unwire that would make me instantly happier that I continuously don't do, I choose the other path because it's more instantly gratifying, it's easier to get a synthetic buzz out of it."

In the same interview, he then went on to contrast this with the themes of "Limousine", which he called the "duality" to this song. He also noted on the lyrics "stop pushing daisies" and "golden raspberry", from the award ceremony of the name which Sykes called the "anti-award", comparing to themes of self-rejection, self-worth, social media gratification, and the journey to happiness, stating:

"The whole idea is 'Stop kidding yourself, this is the life you want, you're looking for flowers, you're looking for gratification, but what good is that if you're already dead, if you're doing something that's just soulless.' In a world where we get a buzz off of a little red heart being pressed, what is our idea now of a goal that we want to attain? [...] It's about asking ourselves, 'Is that gonna make us happy?', 'Where are we going?', 'What are we trying to achieve?', 'Are they things that are ever gonna make us truly happy?', because I know for a fact that things that I've chased don't make me happy whatsoever."

== Live performances ==
The song debuted live on 23 April 2026, at the Hollywood Palladium in Los Angeles at the band's first performance of their Ascension Program 2 North American tour.

== Earthcore remix ==
On 30 January 2025, the band released a stripped-back and "ethereal" remix, dubbed "Earthcore", as the B-side to their cover of Oasis' Wonderwall, released together as part of the Spotify Singles series, to donate profits to Teenage Cancer Trust.

== Personnel ==
Credits are adapted from Tidal.

Bring Me the Horizon

- Oli Sykes – lead vocals, production, programming, composition, lyrics
- Matt Nicholls – drums, composition
- Lee Malia – guitars, production, composition
- Matt Kean – bass

Additional personnel

- Dan Lancaster – keyboards, backing vocals, production, programming, composition
- Zakk Cervini – production, mixing, composition
- Julian Gargiulo – engineering, mixing, additional production
- Daidai – additional production
- Lonelyspeck – additional production
- Ted Jensen – mastering
- Mark Kouznetsov – strings

== Charts ==
Chart performance for "Youtopia"
Chart (2024)	Peak position
New Zealand Hot Singles (RMNZ)	19
UK Singles (Official Charts)	50
UK Rock & Metal (Official Charts)	6
