= Live in São Paulo =

Live in São Paulo may refer to:

- Live in São Paulo (Sepultura album)
- Live in São Paulo (Richie Kotzen album)
- L.I.V.E in São Paulo (Bring Me the Horizon album)
