= Code Mistake =

Single by Corpse Husband featuring Bring Me the Horizon
- Released: 30 June 2023
- Recorded: 2023
- Length: 2:45
- Label: Self-released
- Songwriters: Corpse Husband; Oli Sykes; Jordan Fish; Zakk Cervini
- Producers: Sykes; Cervini; Evil Twin; Fish

Corpse Husband singles chronology
"under the weather" (2023)	"Code Mistake" (2023)	"Disdain" (2023)

Bring Me the Horizon singles chronology
"Amen!" (2023)	"Code Mistake" (2023)	"Darkside" (2023)

Music video
- "CODE MISTAKE" on YouTube

"Code Mistake" (stylised in all caps) is a song by American YouTuber Corpse Husband featuring Bring Me the Horizon. It was released as a single on 30 June 2023.

== Composition and lyrics ==
The lyrics of "Code Mistake" describe issues such as personal conflict, self-doubt and loneliness. A hint of irony is added in the outro when Oli Sykes laughs and states he will always be a “code mistake,” implying that accepting oneself and one’s perceived shortcomings may be liberating.

== Music video ==
An animated music video was released on YouTube on 8 July 2023. It was directed by Tristan Zammit and features Corpse in different scenarios, such as being executed in front of a crowd and growing wings inside an abandoned hospital. Meanwhile, Oli Sykes is stuck in a guillotine and is then shown as a vampire.

== Charts ==
Chart performance for "Code Mistake"
Chart (2023)	Peak position
New Zealand Hot Singles (RMNZ)	13
US Hot Rock & Alternative Songs (Billboard)	35
