= Watch This (Lil Uzi Vert song) =

Unreleased 2019 song by Lil Uzi Vert

Song by Lil Uzi Vert
- Released: April 7, 2022 (leak)
- Genre: Hip hop
- Length: 3:16
- Label: Generation Now; Atlantic
- Songwriters: Symere Woods; Amir Sanders; Brady Ponder
- Producers: Forza; Kado

Music video
- "Watch This" on YouTube

"Watch This (ArizonaTears Pluggnb Remix)"

Single by Lil Uzi Vert and ArizonaTears
- Released: February 5, 2023
- Genre: Pluggnb
- Length: 2:44
- Label: Sped Up Nightcore
- Songwriters: Woods; ArizonaTears; Sanders; Ponder
- Producer: ArizonaTears

Lil Uzi Vert singles chronology
"High" (2023)	"Watch This (ArizonaTears Pluggnb Remix)" (2023)	"Amen!" (2023)

"Watch This" is an unreleased song by American rapper Lil Uzi Vert produced by Kado and Philadelphian producer Forza. It was initially previewed on an Instagram livestream on March 12, 2019, and thought to appear on their second studio album Eternal Atake. In November 2019, Lil Uzi Vert publicly accused Forza of selling their unreleased material, prompting Forza to be removed from producer collective Working on Dying and the song to remain unreleased.

The song, along with its music video, leaked online in its entirety on April 7, 2022. On August 15, 2022, American producer ArizonaTears uploaded their remix of the song on SoundCloud. This version went viral on TikTok in the following months, resulting in the remix being released to streaming under the Atlantic Records subsidiary Sped Up Nightcore as a single on February 5, 2023, and charting in multiple countries.

== Charts ==
=== Weekly charts ===
Weekly chart performance for "Watch This" (ArizonaTears Pluggnb Remix)
Chart (2023)	Peak position
Canada Hot 100 (Billboard)	41
Global 200 (Billboard)	75
Ireland (IRMA)	53
Latvia (LAIPA)	11
Lithuania (AGATA)	16
Netherlands (Single Tip)	14
New Zealand (Recorded Music NZ)	38
Portugal (AFP)	188
Switzerland (Schweizer Hitparade)	93
UK Singles (OCC)	69
UK Indie (OCC)	26
US Billboard Hot 100	56
US Hot R&B/Hip-Hop Songs (Billboard)	19

=== Year-end charts ===
Year-end chart performance for "Watch This" (ArizonaTears Pluggnb Remix)
Chart (2023)	Position
US Hot R&B/Hip-Hop Songs (Billboard)	66

== Certifications ==
Certification for "Watch This"
Region	Certification	Certified units/sales
Poland (ZPAV)	Gold	25,000^{‡}
^{‡} Sales+streaming figures based on certification alone.

Certification for "Watch This (ArizonaTears Pluggnb Remix)"
Region	Certification	Certified units/sales
New Zealand (RMNZ)	Platinum	30,000^{‡}
United Kingdom (BPI)	Silver	200,000^{‡}
United States (RIAA)	Platinum	1,000,000^{‡}
^{‡} Sales+streaming figures based on certification alone.
