= There Is a Hell Believe Me I've Seen It. There Is a Heaven Let's Keep It a Secret. =

Studio album by Bring Me the Horizon
- Released: 4 October 2010
- Recorded: March–June 2010
- Studios: IF, Gothenburg; Sunset Lodge, Los Angeles
- Genres: Metalcore; post-hardcore
- Length: 52:52
- Labels: Visible Noise; Epitaph
- Producers: Fredrik Nordström; Henrik Udd

Bring Me the Horizon chronology
| Suicide Season (2008) | There Is a Hell Believe Me I've Seen It. There Is a Heaven Let's Keep It a Secret. (2010) | The Chill Out Sessions (2012) |

Singles from There Is a Hell Believe Me I've Seen It. There Is a Heaven Let's Keep It a Secret.
- 1. "It Never Ends" Released: 20 August 2010; 2. "Visions" Released: 22 August 2011

There Is a Hell Believe Me I've Seen It. There Is a Heaven Let's Keep It a Secret. (Normally abbreviated to There Is a Hell...) is the third studio album by British rock band Bring Me the Horizon. It was released on 4 October 2010 by Visible Noise. The album was produced by Fredrik Nordström and Henrick Udd at IF Studios in Gothenburg, Sweden, with additional work at Sunset Lodge Studios in Los Angeles, California. It features guest vocals from Canadian singer Lights, British singer Josh Franceschi, and American vocalist Josh Scogin.

The album was recorded from March to June 2010. It expands on the band's previous material, drawing from the metalcore genre and incorporating a wide variety of experimentation, symphonic, industrial and electronic influences, clean vocals, and choral vocal samples. The band described Oliver Sykes' lyric writing as "personal" and "darker and moodier than music on the previous albums". The title is taken from the opening track, which is repeated multiple times throughout the song.

There Is a Hell... received highly positive reviews from music critics, who praised the album's musicianship, lyrical content, experimentation, and maturity compared with the band's previous material. It is the only Bring Me the Horizon album with rhythm guitarist Jona Weinhofen before his departure in January 2013. The album charted in several countries, including Canada, Germany, Sweden, the United Kingdom and the United States, and topped the charts in Australia. Two tracks were released as singles and five as music videos; "It Never Ends" charted on the UK Rock Chart, the UK Independent Chart and the UK Singles Chart.

== Background and recording ==
After completing most of their writing in rural Scotland, the band went to IF Studios in Sweden in March and worked with producer Fredrik Nordström to finish recording most of the album by June. At that time, the band were influenced by many other musical genres beside metal and considered changing their approach to songwriting.

Delays caused the band to fall behind their planned recording schedule at IF Studios. Just before the band embarked on their Warped Tour, they recorded six of the vocal tracks for the album during three days in Los Angeles. They initially wanted Lucy Conroy of the indie pop band Lucy and the Caterpillar to sing on the album, but her contribution was not included. While the band was in Los Angeles, they became aware that electronic musician Lights was in the same city and asked her to record with them, which she did.

== Composition ==
=== Influences, style and themes ===
"Crucify Me"
The opening track of the album "Crucify Me" features guest vocals from Lights and her contribution has been highlighted as "flower appearing out of a war zone" and hers and Sykes vocals have been "glitched out" to provide controlled chaos.

"Visions"
Track 8 off the album "Visions" has been described as a "casus belli" of the album incorporates a catchy guitar riff and chorus.

Much like the band's previous work, There Is a Hell... is primarily considered metalcore. It has also occasionally been referred to as post-hardcore. Bring Me the Horizon commonly use technical guitar riffs, dark lyrics, heavy breakdowns, and gang vocals in their music. The album develops Bring Me the Horizon's experimental, electronic tendencies, taking their original sound and infusing it with female vocals, choral vocals, orchestral sounds, emotive guitars, and "jarring" electronics. The album also blends aesthetics from electronica, classical, pop, classic rock, psychedelia, hardcore punk and progressive metal genres. In its review of the album, Metal Hammer wrote that the album was influenced by the works of The Red Chord, Killswitch Engage, and Pink Floyd.

The album's opening track, "Crucify Me", has vocals by Lights and an acoustic ending. "It Never Ends" is a combination of "massive walls of string orchestra and a Killswitch Engage epicness [sic]". "Don't Go" starts with delicate string instruments and guitars, and is noted for its emotional vulnerability. "Home Sweet Hole" and "Alligator Blood" are reminiscent of the sound of the band's earlier album Suicide Season. "Visions" is "the spacious reverberating guitar-spaces of post-hardcore experimentalist Isis" mixed with breakdowns and a catchy chorus. Electronic artist Skrillex is featured on Visions, singing clean backup vocals during the chorus. "Blacklist" and "Memorial" provide respite from the album's rage. While the former possesses a punk rock influence, the latter is an instrumental keyboard intermission. According to the reviewer Drew Beringer, the songs "It Never Ends" and "Blessed with a Curse" sonically pay homage to the album's title and show a contrast between Heaven and Hell. "Blessed with a Curse" has a sound that has been called "restrained post-rock".

The lyrics of There Is a Hell... are about man battling his self-perpetuated inner turmoil. It has been described as almost conceptual for Sykes; the album's announcement from Epitaph said it "vividly explores humanity's collective good nature". The band have regarded the album's lyrical themes as repercussions of those of the band's second album. Matt Nicholls described Sykes' lyrics as darker and moodier than the music on previous albums. When asked about the truth of the lyrics, Sykes said, "It's all about me. Everything I write is personal. And it's all very true ... It's stuff I don't talk to people about. But when I put pen to paper, it's a lot easier." When Sykes commented on people's interpretation of the record's lyrics he said, "people might think they know what I'm singing about, but they don't. They did not do the things I did. But I want people to be able to apply it to themselves."

== Promotion and release ==
The entire album began streaming on the band's Myspace page on 28 September 2010, before its release. The album was released in the United Kingdom on 4 October 2010 by Visible Noise, and by Epitaph Records the next day in the United States and Canada.

There Is a Hell... was accompanied by a preview trailer for the album, which was published on the Epitaph Records YouTube channel. A 30-second sample of the first single "It Never Ends" was released on 20 August. A music video directed by Jakob Printzlau was released in conjunction with the single's release. The single reached number 3 on the UK Rock Chart, number 11 on the UK Indie Chart, and number 103 on the mainstream UK Singles Chart, all within its first week of sales. On 14 September, the song "Fuck" was released through the band's Myspace, PureVolume and Facebook pages, and on the Visible Noise YouTube channel and Epitaph Records' SoundCloud page. Shortly after the release of the album on 7 December, the band released a music video for "Anthem".

In 2011, the band continued promoting the album using music videos. In late March, they released a video for the single "Blessed with a Curse", which failed to chart anywhere. The music video was filmed in Oslo, Norway. NME described it as "a series of artistic portraits shots of the band mixed in with a disturbing narrative". In late August, the fourth music video, "Visions", was released, and the final music video from the album, "Alligator Blood", was released on 31 October the same year.

=== Tours and performances ===
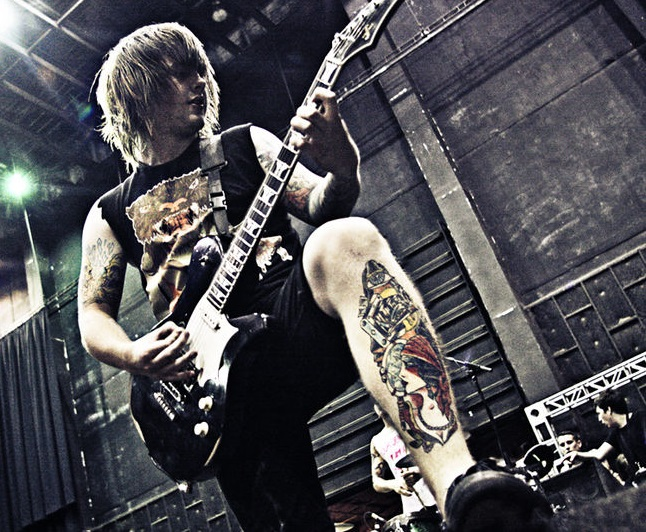
Lead guitarist Lee Malia performing in 2010.

In December 2010, Bring Me the Horizon were the main support band for Bullet for My Valentine, alongside Atreyu, in a five-date arena tour of the United Kingdom. To cope with high demand, the tour's promoters Live Nation released extra standing tickets for all dates. Rumours about why Bring Me the Horizon's sets were cut short circulated; this was because the shows became more violent and uncontrollable. When asked about the shows, Matt Nicholls said the band was told they were not allowed to climb on the stage equipment or set pieces, nor to interact with the crowd. The band opposed these rules by initiating walls of death.

Bring Me the Horizon embarked on a full European headline tour to support the album in April 2011, starting in the United Kingdom. They toured with Parkway Drive and Architects as their main support bands, while their opening acts consisted of The Devil Wears Prada in the UK and the dubstep group Tek-one for the continental Europe leg. The tour received much positive press and was considered their biggest headline tour ever; Rock Sound called it the "tour of the year". The tour was not problem-free. On 28 April, Matt Nicholls broke his arm while playing football with members of Bring Me the Horizon, Parkway Drive, and Architects; instead of cancelling the tour, Architects' drummer Dan Searle filled in, causing the length of Bring Me the Horizon's set list to be halved. The tour was extended with a North American leg from 31 August to 4 October, retaining Parkway Drive and Architects, while adding Deez Nuts as an opening band.

A few months later, in December 2011, Bring Me the Horizon accompanied Machine Head's European arena tour as the main support band alongside DevilDriver and Darkest Hour. Oliver Sykes said those would be Bring Me the Horizon's last European dates before recording their fourth album. Bring Me the Horizon's presence on the tour received a mixed reception from fans; Dave Bowes of The Fly, with a live review of their performance at SECC in Glasgow, said their performance was "simply in the wrong place at the wrong time but they choose to be the better men ... "

== Reception ==
=== Critical reception ===
Professional ratings
Aggregate scores
| Source | Rating |
|---|---|
| Metacritic | (80/100) |
Review scores
| Source | Rating |
| AbsolutePunk | (85%) |
| AllMusic | 3.5/5 stars |
| Big Cheese | 4.5/5 stars |
| Kerrang! | 5/5 stars |
| Metal Hammer | 4.5/5 stars |
| Q | 4/5 stars |
| Revolver | 2.5/5 stars |
| Rock Sound | 4.5/5 stars |
| Spin | (6/10) |
| Sputnikmusic | 5/5 stars |

At Metacritic, which assigns a normalized rating out of 100 to reviews from mainstream critics, There Is a Hell... received an average score of 80 based on nine reviews, which indicates "favorable reviews". Reviewers praised the album for its experimental combination of Sykes' cathartic and introspective lyrics with orchestral and electronica elements, along with its overall more mature, thematically darker direction, seeing it as the beginning of the band's evolution into respected musicians, compared to the relatively more divided responses their previous albums received. Big Cheese noted the variety on the album and said it crossed " ... the youthful energy and passion of 2006's Count Your Blessings, the rawness and anthemic nature of 2008's Suicide Season and with more experimentation and savageness than ever before, this is the sound of Bring Me the Horizon going for the throat".

The British publication Rock Sound gave the album significant critical acclaim. Upon its release, Rock Sound writer Pete Withers praised its lyrical content and musical diversity as " ... a bold and unrestrained body of work which is unafraid to push their more experimental, electronic tendencies to the fore and feature lyrics of a highly personal, bluntly confessional nature". Rock Sound named There Is a Hell... their "Album of the Year", as well as rating it at number 8 out of 101 "Modern Classics". Mike Diver, writing for BBC Music, gave the album a positive review, particularly praising the band's bold ambition to progress from Suicide Season. He said, "They've not done everything the easy way, but Bring Me the Horizon today stand at the very vanguard of the UK metal scene. This third album takes risks with confidence, and the end results are never less than startling." Metal Hammer's review of the album summarised it as " ... one of the heaviest, most aggressive and best metal releases this year". Kerrang! was also positive in reviewing the album's dark themes, saying, " ... while bleakness is certainly prominent throughout, this album has many different shades and it is these contrasts that make it so vital. It's an album that bursts with ambition, and that Bring Me the Horizon pull it off so powerfully further confirms their greatness."

Exclaim! critic Travis Persaud gave the album a positive review, praising the sonic diversity and Sykes' screaming, as there was " ... desperation in his voice, very reminiscent of Spencer Chamberlain from Underoath". AbsolutePunk said the album would " ... destroy any and all preconceived notions about the band". AllMusic writer Gregory Heaney praised the lack of "over indulgent" production on the record, by incorporating studio trickery yet still being intense. However, not all reviews were positive; Spin magazine gave the album a lukewarm review, saying, "Is this bizarre smash-up the future of metal or just Generation Y's Pitchshifter?"

=== Accolades ===
| Publication | Country | Accolade | Year | Rank |
|---|---|---|---|---|
| Rock Sound | UK | Top 75 Albums of 2010 | 2012 | 1 |
| Rock Sound | UK | Rock Sound's 101 Modern Classics | 2012 | 8 |

According to Dayal Patterson of Metal Hammer, There Is a Hell... is seen as a significant turning point in altering the public perception of the band. Simon Neil of Biffy Clyro chose the album as his choice in an article on the "Best Sounds of 2010", writing " ... it is one of the best metal records I have heard in years: jam-packed with ideas and energy, and, most importantly for a metal record, the vocals don't make you cringe".

== Commercial performance ==
In the United Kingdom, There Is a Hell... charted at number 13 on the album chart and number one on both the rock and independent charts with 8,916 units sold in the first week. The album has sold 54,105 copies in the UK by September 2015. It had success in Australia, where it debuted at number one with sales of 3,600 units, setting a record for the smallest number of sales in a week for a number one album. It later had the second-largest weekly decline for a number one album in ARIA chart history when it dropped from one to 20. Only Psycho Circus by Kiss had a more precipitous drop, from one to 32. There Is a Hell... sold 20,200 copies in the US in its first week, making it the fastest-selling album released by the band.

== Track listing ==
All lyrics are written by Oli Sykes; all music is composed by Bring Me the Horizon.

| No. | Title | Length |
|---|---|---|
| 1. | "Crucify Me" (featuring Lights) | 6:19 |
| 2. | "Anthem" | 4:50 |
| 3. | "It Never Ends" | 4:34 |
| 4. | "Fuck" (featuring Josh Franceschi) | 4:55 |
| 5. | "Don't Go" (featuring Lights) | 4:58 |
| 6. | "Home Sweet Hole" | 4:37 |
| 7. | "Alligator Blood" | 4:31 |
| 8. | "Visions" | 4:08 |
| 9. | "Blacklist" | 4:00 |
| 10. | "Memorial" (instrumental) | 3:09 |
| 11. | "Blessed with a Curse" | 5:08 |
| 12. | "The Fox and the Wolf" (featuring Josh Scogin) | 1:43 |
| Total length: | | 52:52 |

United States iTunes Store deluxe version bonus tracks
| No. | Title | Length |
|---|---|---|
| 13. | "It Never Ends" (video) | 4:41 |
| 14. | "Chelsea Smile – Live at Warped Tour 2010" (video) (also United Kingdom iTunes Store bonus track) | 4:09 |
| Total length: | | 61:42 |

Sony Music Entertainment Japan bonus tracks
| No. | Title | Length |
|---|---|---|
| 13. | "Chelsea Smile" (KC Blitz remix) | 4:10 |
| 14. | "Football Season Is Over" (After the Night remix) | 3:54 |
| 15. | "The Sadness Will Never End" (Skrillex remix) | 6:01 |
| Total length: | | 66:57 |

== Personnel ==
Bring Me the Horizon

- Oli Sykes – vocals
- Lee Malia – guitar
- Jona Weinhofen – guitar
- Matt Kean – bass
- Matt Nicholls – drums

Additional musicians

- Lights – guest vocals on tracks 1 and 5
- Josh Franceschi – guest clean vocals on track 4
- Josh Scogin – guest vocals, additional guitar on track 12
- Skrillex – additional programming, backing vocals on track 8
- Kaleo James – backing vocals on track 4
- Anna Maria Engberg – additional vocals on track 1
- Elin Engberg – additional vocals on track 1
- The Fredman Choristers – additional vocals on tracks 1 and 3

Studio personnel at Studio Fredman

- Fredrik Nordström – production, mixing, mastering
- Henrik Udd – production, mixing, mastering
- Andy Hayball – assistant engineering

Studio personnel at Sunset Lodge Studios

- Chris Rakestraw – additional vocal recording and production

Additional personnel

- Jamie Kossoff and Jon Courtney – additional vocals and production
- Matt O'Grady – vocal production and engineering of Josh Franceschi
- Jakob Printzlau (also known as Plastic Kid) – artwork design and concept
- Michael Falgren – artwork photography

== Charts ==
Chart performance for There Is a Hell...
| Chart (2010) | Peak position |
|---|---|
| Australian Albums (ARIA) | 1 |
| Canadian Albums (Billboard) | 22 |
| German Albums (Offizielle Top 100) | 52 |
| German Newcomer (GfK Entertainment) | 4 |
| Japanese Albums (Oricon) | 70 |
| Scottish Albums (Official Charts) | 18 |
| Swedish Albums (Sverigetopplistan) | 30 |
| UK Albums (Official Charts) | 13 |
| UK Rock & Metal Albums (Official Charts) | 1 |
| UK Independent Albums (Official Charts) | 1 |
| US Billboard 200 | 17 |
| US Independent Albums (Billboard) | 2 |
| US Top Alternative Albums (Billboard) | 18 |
| US Top Hard Rock Albums (Billboard) | 2 |
| US Top Rock Albums (Billboard) | 2 |

Chart performance for There Is a Hell...
| Chart (2026) | Peak position |
|---|---|
| UK Rock & Metal Albums (Official Charts) | 18 |

== Certifications ==
| Region | Certification | Certified units/sales |
|---|---|---|
| United Kingdom (BPI) | Gold | 100,000^{‡} |
^{‡} Sales+streaming figures based on certification alone.

== Release history ==
| Country | Date | Label | Format | Catalog number | Source |
|---|---|---|---|---|---|
| Europe (excl. Austria, Germany and Switzerland) | 4 October 2010 | Visible Noise | CD | TORMENT159 | |
| United States | 5 October 2010 | Epitaph | CD | 87065 | |
| Japan | 6 October 2010 | Sony | CD | SICP-2840 | |
| Australia | 8 October 2010 | Shock | CD | CTX594CD | |
| Austria | 8 October 2010 | Plastic Head | CD | TORMENT159 | |
| Germany | 8 October 2010 | Plastic Head | CD | TORMENT159 | |
| Switzerland | 8 October 2010 | Plastic Head | CD | TORMENT159 | |
| New Zealand | 18 October 2010 | Shock | CD | CTX594CD | |
