= Post Human: Nex Gen =

Studio album by Bring Me the Horizon
- Released: 24 May 2024
- Recorded: 2021–2024
- Studios: Rhythmic Genocide (Sheffield); Casa Do Syko (Brazil)
- Genres: Post-hardcore; pop-punk; hyperpop; alternative metal; metalcore; electronica; emo; nu metal
- Length: 55:19
- Labels: Sony; RCA; Columbia
- Producers: Oli Sykes; Jordan Fish; Zakk Cervini; Dan Lancaster; BloodPop; Evil Twin; Daidai

Bring Me the Horizon chronology
Post Human: Survival Horror (2020)	Post Human: Nex Gen (2024)	Lo-files (2025)

Singles from Post Human: Nex Gen
- 1. "Die4U" Released: 16 September 2021; 2. "Strangers" Released: 6 July 2022; 3. "Lost" Released: 4 May 2023; 4. "Amen!" Released: 1 June 2023; 5. "Darkside" Released: 13 October 2023; 6. "Kool-Aid" Released: 5 January 2024; 7. "Top 10 Statues That Cried Blood" Released: 5 June 2024

Post Human: Nex Gen (stylised as POST HUMAN: NeX GEn) is the seventh studio album by the British rock band Bring Me the Horizon. It was surprise released on 24 May 2024, originally planned for 15 September 2023, as the second installment of the Post Human series, following Post Human: Survival Horror (2020). It is the band's first studio album since Amo in 2019, marking the longest gap between studio albums in the band's career. It is also the last album to feature band keyboardist and supporting producer Jordan Fish, as he departed from the group in late 2023. The album features guest contributions from Aurora, Underoath, Lil Uzi Vert and Daryl Palumbo. The album received mostly positive reviews from critics upon release.

== Release ==
On 16 September 2021, the band released the album's lead single, "Die4U". The second single, "Strangers" was released on 6 July 2022. On 4 May 2023, the third single, "Lost", was released. On 1 June 2023, the fourth single, "Amen!" featuring Daryl Palumbo of Glassjaw and Lil Uzi Vert, was released. In June 2023, the band announced Post Human: Nex Gen, with 15 September 2023 as the original release date. However, on 24 August, Sykes announced that the release was being delayed due to "unforeseen circumstances" which had left the band "unable to complete the record to the standard we'd be happy with". The fifth single, "Darkside", was released on 13 October 2023. On 22 December 2023, the band announced that keyboardist Jordan Fish was leaving the band. On 5 January 2024, the band released the record's sixth single, "Kool-Aid". On 23 May 2024, the band announced the album's release date, 24 May 2024. The band released a music video for the album's seventh single "Top 10 Statues That Cried Blood" on 5 June.

== Composition ==
Critics have described Post Human: Nex Gen as post-hardcore, pop-punk, hyperpop, alternative metal, metalcore, electronica, emo, nu metal, and easycore. Neil Z. Yeung of AllMusic has noted the band combining many genres in the album, "tossing in hyperpop flourish, pop-punk energy, glitchy electronic chaos, hardcore aggression, death growls, pop choruses, and anything else the band could think of, channeling everyone from Sum 41 and KMFDM to Charli XCX and Poppy." Other comparisons made included the Used, the Smashing Pumpkins, and Deftones.

== Critical reception ==
Professional ratings
Aggregate scores
Source	Rating
AnyDecentMusic?	7.4/10
Metacritic	84/100
Review scores
Source	Rating
AllMusic	4/5 stars
Clash	8/10
Distorted Sound	8/10
Dork	4/5 stars
The Guardian	5/5 stars
Kerrang!	4/5
Metal Hammer	3.5/5 stars
NME	4/5 stars
Rolling Stone UK	4/5 stars
Sputnikmusic	2.0/5

Post Human: Nex Gen received positive reviews from critics. At Metacritic, which assigns a normalised rating out of 100 to reviews from mainstream critics, the album has an average score of 84 out of 100, based on 6 reviews, indicating "universal acclaim". Neil Z. Yeung of AllMusic, called the album, "one of the most rewarding and indulgent releases in Bring Me the Horizon's post-Sempiternal era." According to Tom Kingsley of Clash, "[the] experimentation doesn't always work, but it's successful often enough to make 'Nex Gen' an album worthy of deep and repeated listens." Ed Walton of Distorted Sound felt the album "was absolutely worth the wait", and called it a "perfect continuation from what Survival Horror gave us." According to Ali Shutler of Dork, "the whole record flows on the right side of chaos...It's urgent, but never oppressive." Ben Beaumont-Thomas writing for The Guardian, called it "a defining album of our digitally overloaded era." According to Nick Ruskell of Kerrang!, "BMTH have proven themselves equal to matching the creative demands it's placed on them."

Writing for Metal Hammer, Emily Swingle called the album "Chaotic, confusing and nonsensical", and "feels like it shouldn't work – but, surprisingly, that's also why it does." Rishi Shah of NME described it as "an album that is such a bombardment of sound and colour", and considered it to be worth the four-year wait. Nick Reilly of Rolling Stone, called it "an endlessly creative rock epic that shows the Bring Me juggernaut is in no danger of slowing down". Sputnikmusic was less positive stating, "How does one band manage to rip off Deaf Havana, Deftones, Boston Manor, Enter Shikari, Porter [Robinson], Green Day, Radiohead, MGK, Iggy Pop and DreamWeaver, feature Underoath, Aurora, Lil Uzi Vert, Daryl Palumbo...and be this goddamn boring?" According to Tyler Rubke of Wall of Sound, "Post Human: Nex Gen is a quintessential Bring Me the Horizon experience and undoubtedly one of their most inventive and diverse records to date."

Loudwire ranked it as the 6th best rock album of 2024. NME ranked it as the 49th best album of 2024 in their top 50 year-end list.

== Track listing ==
Post Human: Nex Gen track listing
No.	Title	Lyrics	Music	Producer(s)	Length
1.	"(OST) Dreamseeker"	Oli Sykes	Sykes; Cynthoni	Sykes; Cynthoni	0:19
2.	"Youtopia"	Sykes	Sykes; Lee Malia; Matthew Nicholls; Zakk Cervini; Dan Lancaster; Sione Teumohenga	Sykes; Malia; Cervini; Lancaster; Julian Gargiulo^{[a]}; Lonelyspeck^{[a]}; Daidai^{[a]}	4:02
3.	"Kool-Aid"	Sykes; Malia; Nicholls; Cervini; Daisuke Ehara; Lancaster	Sykes; Malia; Nicholls; Cervini; Ehara; Lancaster	Lancaster; Sykes; Cervini; Daidai^{[a]}; Gargiulo^{[a]}	3:48
4.	"Top 10 Statues That Cried Blood"	Sykes	Sykes; Malia; Nicholls; Cervini; Ehara; Lancaster; RJ Pasin	Lancaster; Sykes; Cervini; RJ Pasin^{[a]}; Daidai^{[a]}; Gargiulo^{[a]}	4:00
5.	"Limousine" (featuring Aurora)	Sykes	Sykes; Malia; Nicholls; Aurora Aksnes; Cervini; Ehara; Andrew Goldstein; Lancaster	Cervini; Lancaster; Sykes; Daidai^{[a]}; Gargiulo^{[a]}	4:11
6.	"Darkside"	Sykes; Cervini	Sykes; Malia; Nicholls; Cervini; Fish; Goldstein; Gianni Taylor	Cervini; Daidai; Sykes; Taylor^{[a]}	2:45
7.	"A Bullet w/ My Name On" (featuring Underoath)	Sykes	Sykes; Malia; Nicholls; Cervini; Ehara; Fish; Goldstein; Lancaster	Fish; Sykes; Cervini; Lancaster; Lonelyspeck^{[a]}; Daidai^{[a]}; Gargiulo^{[a]}	4:20
8.	"(OST) (Spi)ritual"	Sykes; Cervini; Alexander Nosenko	Sykes; Malia; Kean; Nicholls	Sykes; Cervini; Nosenko^{[a]}; Gargiulo^{[a]}	1:54
9.	"N/A"	Sykes	Sykes; Malia; Nicholls; Cervini; Ehara; Fish; Lancaster; Teumohenga	Fish; Sykes; Cervini; Lancaster; Lonelyspeck^{[a]}; Daidai^{[a]}; Gargiulo^{[a]}	3:20
10.	"Lost"	Sykes; Malia; Matt Kean; Nicholls; Fish	Sykes; Malia; Kean; Nicholls; Fish	Cervini; Evil Twin; Nik Trekov^{[a]}; Tracey Brakes^{[a]}; Lonelyspeck^{[a]}	3:25
11.	"Strangers"	Sykes; Malia; Fish; Caroline Ailin; BloodPop	Sykes; Malia; Fish; Ailin; BloodPop	Evil Twin; BloodPop; Cervini; Trekov^{[a]}	3:15
12.	"R.I.P. (Duskcore Remix)"	Sykes; Taylor	Sykes; Malia; Nicholls; Cervini; Danny Couture; Ehara; Lancaster	Lancaster; Sykes; Cervini; Couture; Gargiulo^{[a]}; Daidai^{[a]}; Tracey Brakes^{[a]}	3:23
13.	"Amen!" (featuring Lil Uzi Vert and Daryl Palumbo)	Sykes	Sykes; Malia; Cervini; Fish	Cervini; Evil Twin; Daidai^{[a]}; Deathnyann^{[a]}; Daisuke^{[a]}; Misstiq^{[a]}	3:09
14.	"(OST) P.U.S.S.-E"	Sykes	Sykes; Cynthoni	Sykes; Cynthoni	2:49
15.	"Die4U"	Sykes; BloodPop; Fish; Madison Love; Rami Yacoub	Sykes; BloodPop; Fish; Love; Yacoub	BloodPop; Evil Twin; Gupi^{[a]}	3:27
16.	"Dig It"	Sykes	Sykes; Malia; Nicholls; Cervini; Lancaster	Cervini; Lancaster; Sykes; Gargiulo^{[a]}; Rhys May^{[s]}	7:12
Total length:					55:19

Japanese edition bonus tracks
No.	Title	Length
17.	"Darkside" (live in Tokyo)	3:20
18.	"Lost" (live in Tokyo)	4:24
19.	"Amen!" (live in Tokyo)	4:43
Total length:		67:46

Notes

- ^{^[a]} signifies an additional producer
- ^{^[s]} signifies an assistant producer
- "(OST) Dreamseeker", "(OST) (Spi)ritual", and "(OST) P.U.S.S.-E" are stylised in all lowercase with "OST" between square brackets.
- "Youtopia" is stylised as "YOUtopia".
- All other tracks except "Kool-Aid" are stylised in text notation similar to alternating caps; for example, "Top 10 Statues That Cried Blood" is stylised as "Top 10 staTues tHat CriEd bloOd".
- "Dig It" ends at 5:12. A hidden track starts at 6:42, where a character named "M8" begins speaking to the listener before being interrupted by a distorted screech. When the audio is played through a spectrogram, it reveals a QR code which leads to a website based around the album.

Sample credits

- "N/A" features a crowd chorus from Bring Me the Horizon's 2024 NX_GN tour.
- "R.I.P. (Duskcore Remix)" features a sound effect from the video game Undertale.

== Personnel ==
Bring Me the Horizon

- Oli Sykes – lead vocals (all tracks), programming (1, 2, 4, 5, 7–9, 12, 14, 16), keyboards (8)
- Matt Nicholls – drums (2–7, 9–13, 15, 16)
- Lee Malia – guitar (2–7, 9–13, 15, 16), background vocals (3)
- Matt Kean – bass guitar (2–7, 9–13, 15, 16)
- Jordan Fish – programming (6, 7, 9–11, 13, 15), keyboards (7, 9), background vocals (10, 11, 13, 15)

Additional musicians

- Cynthoni – programming (1, 14), production (1, 14)
- Dan Lancaster – programming (2, 4, 5, 7, 9, 12, 16), keyboards (2, 4, 7, 9, 16), background vocals (2, 4)
- Mark Kouznetsov – strings (2)
- Zakk Cervini – programming (3, 6, 9, 10, 13), background vocals (7)
- Lucy Landry – background vocals (3)
- RJ Pasin – guitar (4)
- Aurora – vocals (5)
- Gianni Taylor – background vocals (6)
- Spencer Chamberlain – vocals (7)
- Aaron Gillespie – vocals (7)
- Alexander Nosenko – keyboards, programming (8)
- Choir Noir – choir vocals (11)
- Daryl Palumbo – vocals (13)
- Lil Uzi Vert – vocals (13)
- BloodPop – programming (15)

Additional personnel

- Zakk Cervini – mixing (all tracks), mastering (3, 6, 10, 13, 15)
- Ted Jensen – mastering (1, 2, 4, 5, 7–9, 11, 12, 14, 16)
- Julian Gargiulo – mixing (1–9, 12, 14, 16), engineering (all tracks)
- Nik Trekov – mixing (15), engineering assistance (13)
- Vyacheslav Rychkov – mixing (8), engineering assistance (12, 14)
- Dan Lancaster – engineering (5)
- Guillermo Rodriguez – engineering (13)
- Ben Thomas – engineering (13)
- Phil Gornell – engineering assistance (3)
- Jason Inguagiato – engineering assistance (5)
- Alissic – artwork

== Charts ==
=== Weekly charts ===
Weekly chart performance for Post Human: Nex Gen
Chart (2024)	Peak position
Australian Albums (ARIA)	2
Austrian Albums (Ö3 Austria)	2
Belgian Albums (Ultratop Flanders)	15
Belgian Albums (Ultratop Wallonia)	34
Canadian Albums (Billboard)	37
Croatian International Albums (HDU)	25
Czech Albums (ČNS IFPI)	8
Dutch Albums (Album Top 100)	19
Finnish Albums (Suomen virallinen lista)	17
French Albums (SNEP)	33
French Rock & Metal Albums (SNEP)	7
German Albums (Offizielle Top 100)	4
Greek Albums (IFPI Greece)	29
Hungarian Albums (MAHASZ)	15
Irish Albums (Official Charts)	26
Italian Albums (FIMI)	76
Japanese Albums (Oricon)	22
Japanese Combined Albums (Oricon)	32
Japanese Rock Albums (Oricon)	4
Japanese Hot Albums (Billboard Japan)	23
Lithuanian Albums (AGATA)	53
New Zealand Albums (RMNZ)	8
Norwegian Albums (VG-lista)	14
Polish Albums (ZPAV)	41
Portuguese Albums (AFP)	19
Scottish Albums (Official Charts)	2
Slovak Albums (ČNS IFPI)	11
Spanish Albums (Promusicae)	21
Swedish Albums (Sverigetopplistan)	27
Swedish Hard Rock Albums (Sverigetopplistan)	1
Swiss Albums (Schweizer Hitparade)	6
UK Albums (Official Charts)	2
UK Rock & Metal Albums (Official Charts)	1
US Billboard 200	36
US Top Rock & Alternative Albums (Billboard)	10

=== Year-end charts ===
Year-end chart performance for Post Human: Nex Gen
Chart (2024)	Position
UK Cassette Albums (OCC)	4
US Top Hard Rock Albums (Billboard)	33

== Certifications ==
Certifications for Post Human: Nex Gen
Region	Certification	Certified units/sales
Australia (ARIA)	Gold	35,000^{‡}
Brazil (Pro-Música Brasil)	Gold	20,000^{‡}
United Kingdom (BPI)	Gold	100,000^{‡}
^{‡} Sales+streaming figures based on certification alone.

== Release history ==
Release history and formats for Post Human: Nex Gen
Region	Date	Format	Label	Ref.
Various	24 May 2024	Digital download; streaming	Sony; RCA	
Various	27 September 2024	CD; vinyl; cassette	Sony; RCA	
United States	27 September 2024	CD; vinyl; cassette	Columbia	
