= Gibson The Paul =

Electric guitar manufactured by Gibson

The Paul
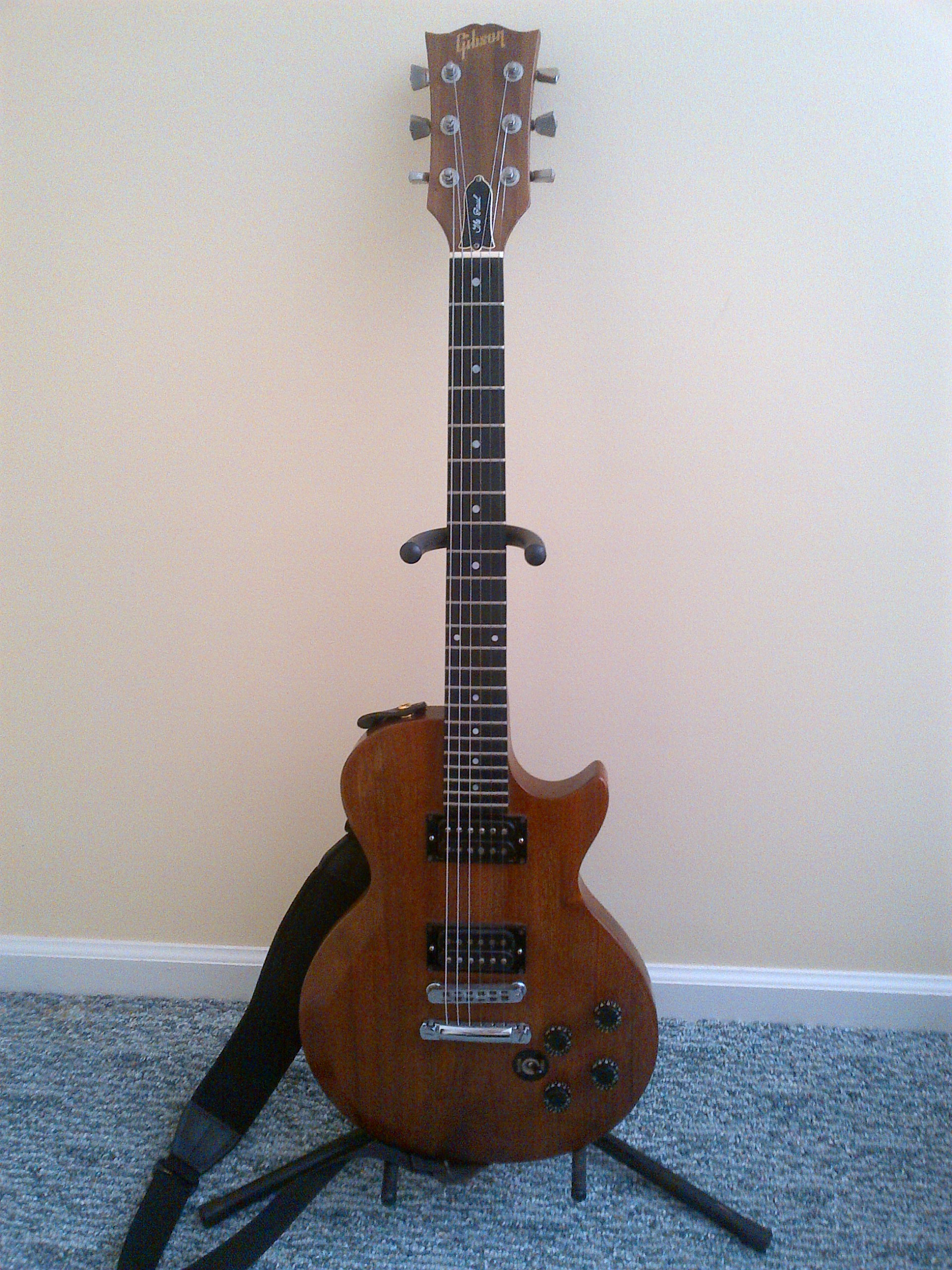
- Manufacturer: Gibson
- Period: 1978–1982, 2018 (The Paul); 1981–1984 (Firebrand)

Construction
- Body type: Solid Walnut (Mahogany 1982–1984)
- Neck joint: Set
- Scale: 24.75 in (629 mm)

Woods
- Body: Walnut
- Neck: Walnut
- Fretboard: 22 fret, Ebony

Hardware
- Bridge: Tune-O-Matic
- Pickup(s): 2 T-tops

The Paul is an electric guitar made by Gibson, manufactured from 1978 to the 1980s.

== History and design ==
The model was developed by Whitey Morrison, the Gibson plant manager in Nashville. It was designed to be the lower-cost Les Paul-style variant in a new series of instruments.

The Paul Standard had a single sharp cutaway Les Paul-style walnut body, set walnut neck, 22-fret ebony fingerboard with pearl dot inlays, walnut headstock with gold Gibson logo (1978–1981), three-per-side tuners, Tune-o-matic bridge, stop tailpiece, two exposed humbucker pickups, some models had "T" top pickups, four potentiometers of 300 kOhm each (two volume, two tone) that gave the guitar a mellower, less harsh tone than 500 kOhm potentiometers, three-way pickup switch, chrome hardware, available in Natural Walnut finish. It had a 24.75-inch (628.6 mm) scale, and 1.6875-inch (42.9 mm) nut width. It was manufactured between 1978 and 1982. The guitar included such high end items as the Grover tuning keys.

The Paul Deluxe (Firebrand) is similar to The Paul Standard, except it has a mahogany body and three-piece mahogany neck. It was manufactured between 1980 and 1986 and was available in Antique Natural, Ebony (1985–86), Natural Mahogany, or Wine Red (1985–86) finish. A standard Gibson logo was branded into the headstock in the deluxe model.

In 1996, the model was resurrected with The Paul II, with a mahogany body and carved top like a Les Paul Studio instead of the flat top of prior models of The Paul The body is 2/3 as thick as a normal Les Paul and features a rear belly cut as well. In 1998 The Paul II was replaced by The Paul SL, itself discontinued in 1999.

In 2018, Gibson reissued The Paul, as it was first introduced 40 years earlier under its 2019 lineup.
