= ARIA Digital Track Chart =

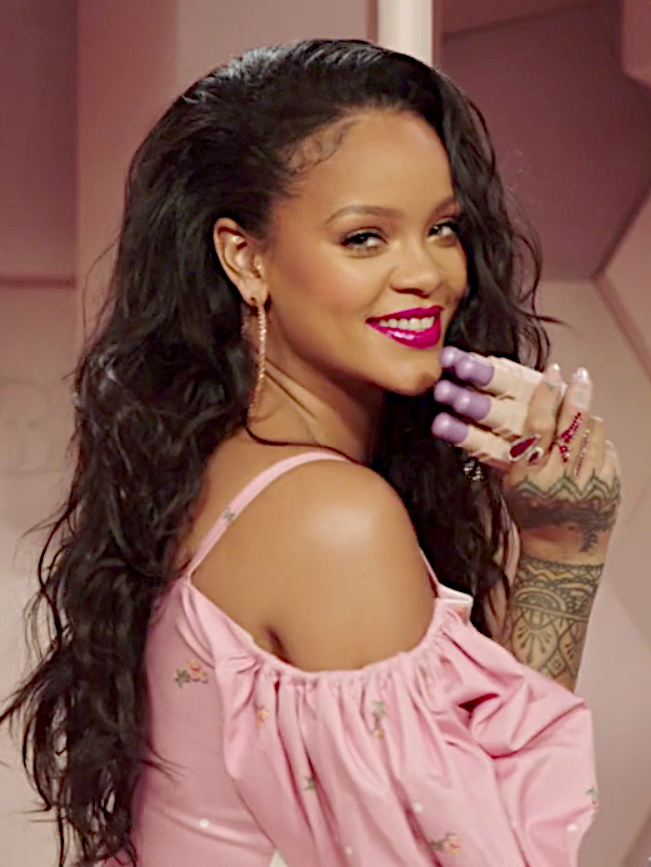
Rihanna holds the record for the most number ones and weeks at number one on the chart

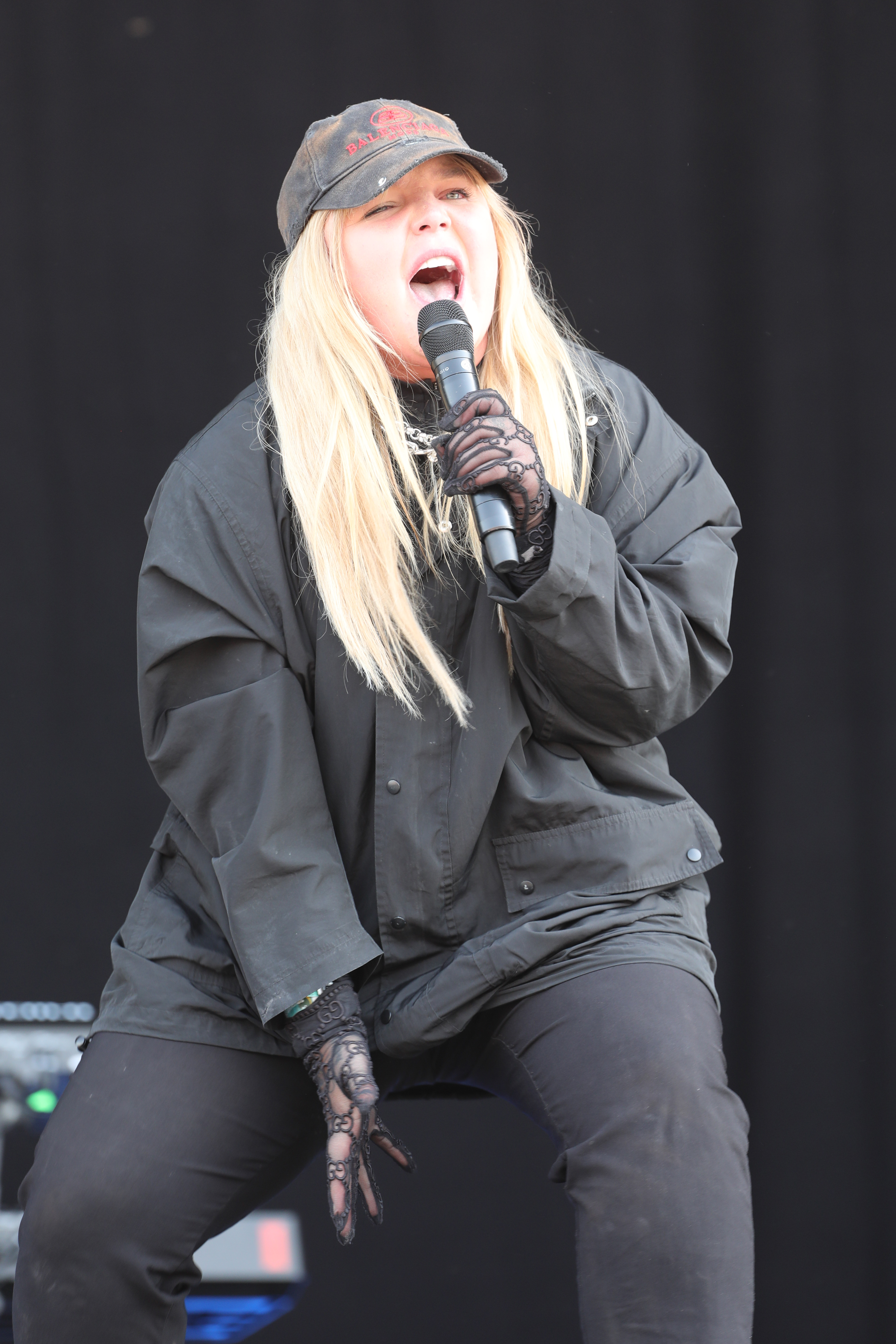
Tones and I holds the record for the most weeks at number one on the chart with one track

The ARIA Digital Track Chart ranks the highest selling legally downloaded music tracks within Australia and is provided by the Australian Recording Industry Association.

== History ==
The Digital Track Chart was established in 2006 and first published on 9 April. Later that year in October it was announced that the sales from physical singles and digital downloads would be integrated with the official Top 100 singles chart which commenced on 8 October. In order for the digital singles to chart on the Top 100 there had to be a physical single release first but in 2007 it was announced that a single would chart on the Top 100 regardless of whether a physical single or a digital single was released first or not. The chart still runs weekly as of 21 November 2025 but Subscription is required to view this chart.

== Trivia ==
=== Songs with the most weeks at number one ===
24 Weeks

- Tones and I – "Dance Monkey" (2019–20)

15 weeks

- Lady Gaga and Bradley Cooper – "Shallow" (2018–19)

14 weeks

- Pharrell Williams – "Happy" (2014)

12 weeks

- Ed Sheeran – "Shape of You" (2017)

10 weeks

- George Ezra – "Shotgun" (2018–19)
- LMFAO – "Party Rock Anthem" (2011)
- Snow Patrol – "Chasing Cars" (2006–07)
- Fergie – "Big Girls Don't Cry" (2007)

9 weeks

- Lil Nas X – "Old Town Road" (2019)
- 5 Seconds of Summer – "Youngblood" (2018)
- Justice Crew – "Que Sera" (2014)
- Katy Perry – "Roar" (2013)
- David Guetta featuring Akon – "Sexy Bitch" (2009)

8 weeks

- James Arthur – "Say You Won't Let Go" (2016)
- Robin Thicke featuring T.I. and Pharrell Williams – "Blurred Lines" (2013)
- Flo Rida – "Whistle" (2012)
- Gotye featuring Kimbra – "Somebody That I Used To Know" (2011)
- Lady Gaga – "Poker Face" (2008–09)
- Timbaland featuring OneRepublic – "Apologize" (2007–08)

7 weeks

- Ed Sheeran – "Perfect" (2017)
- Luis Fonsi and Daddy Yankee featuring Justin Bieber – "Despacito" (2017)
- Lukas Graham – "7 Years" (2016)
- Kesha – "Tik Tok" (2009)
- The Black Eyed Peas – "Boom Boom Pow" (2009)
- The Black Eyed Peas – "I Gotta Feeling" (2009)

=== Cumulative weeks at number one ===
- Rihanna (40)
- Ed Sheeran (31)
- Justin Bieber (25)
- Lady Gaga (24)
- Tones and I (24)
- Flo Rida (23)
- Pink (22)
- Katy Perry (19)
- The Black Eyed Peas (17)
- LMFAO (17)
- Macklemore (17)

=== Artists with the most number ones ===
This list includes main artists and featured artists.

- Rihanna (10)
- Ed Sheeran (9)
- Pink (8)
- Justin Bieber (7)
- Taylor Swift (7)
- Lady Gaga (5)
- Macklemore (5)
- The Black Eyed Peas (4)
- Flo Rida (4)
- Jason Derulo (4)
- Katy Perry (4)
- Ryan Lewis (4)

== See also ==
- ARIA Digital Album Chart
