= Lee Malia =

British guitarist

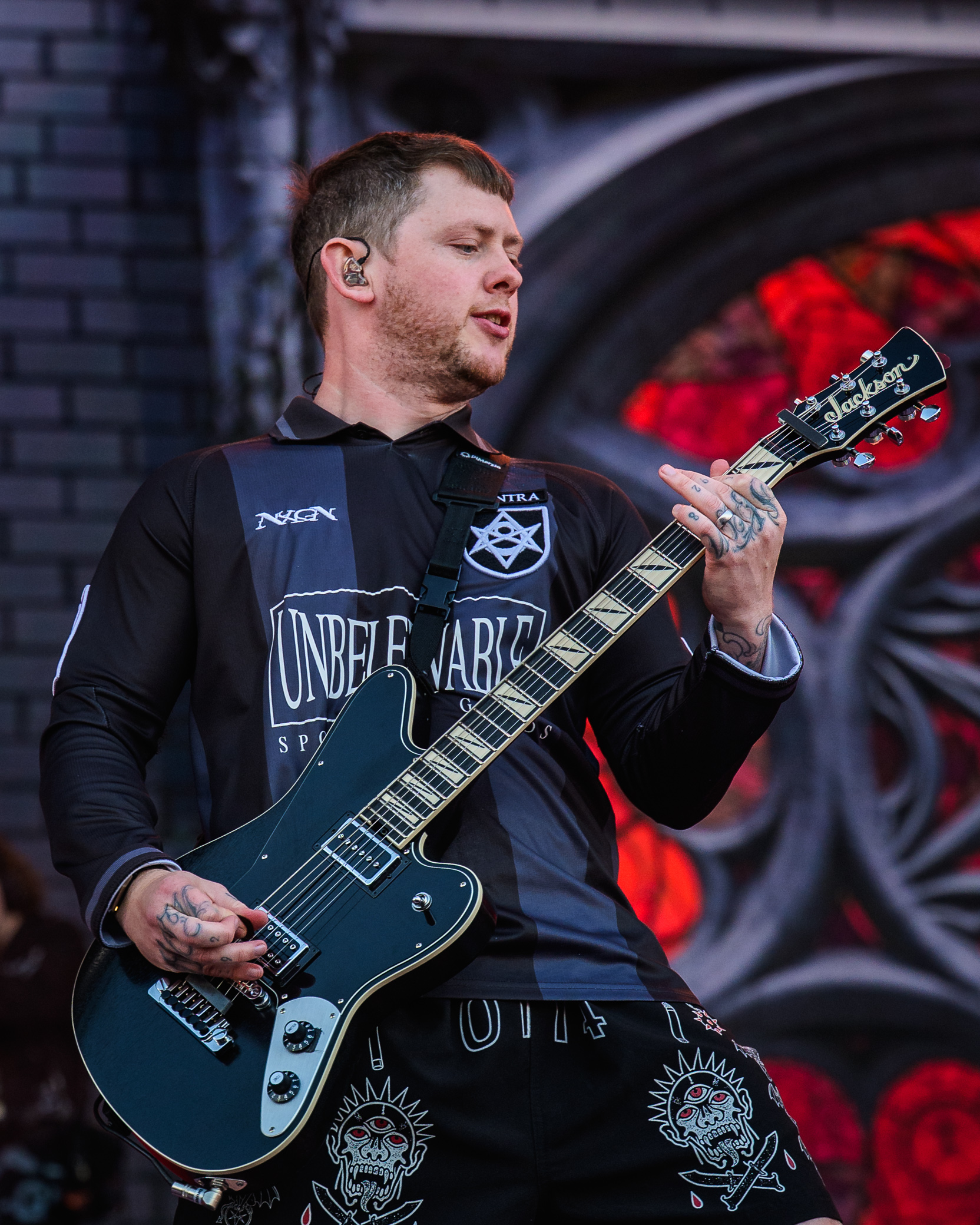
- Malia at Tons of Rock in 2026

Background information
- Born: Lee David Malia; 4 June 1984 (age 42); Sheffield, South Yorkshire, England
- Genres: Metalcore; alternative metal; alternative rock; pop rock; electronic rock; deathcore (early)
- Occupation: Musician
- Instrument: Guitar
- Years active: 2004–present
- Member of: Bring Me the Horizon
- Spouse: Deni Marie McGonigle (m. 2017)

Lee David Malia (born 4 June 1984) is a British musician, best known as the lead guitarist of the rock band Bring Me the Horizon. With the band, he has released seven studio albums. He cites influences from Gary Moore, Bon Iver, and Metallica among many more.

== Early life ==
Malia was born and raised in Sheffield, South Yorkshire. He started learning guitar at a young age with the help of his parents who were also musicians. His dad, who used to play guitar, left one in Malia's room but he never bothered to play it. However, three months after his dad got rid of the guitar, he began picking up an interest in playing music, so he bought his first guitar, a Falcon Strat, at Fox's Music after spending his Christmas money on Boxing Day. He attended Stocksbridge High School where he met Oliver Sykes. Malia played in a cover band where the first song they covered was "All the Small Things" by Blink-182. He also played in a Metallica tribute band before joining Bring Me the Horizon.

== Career ==
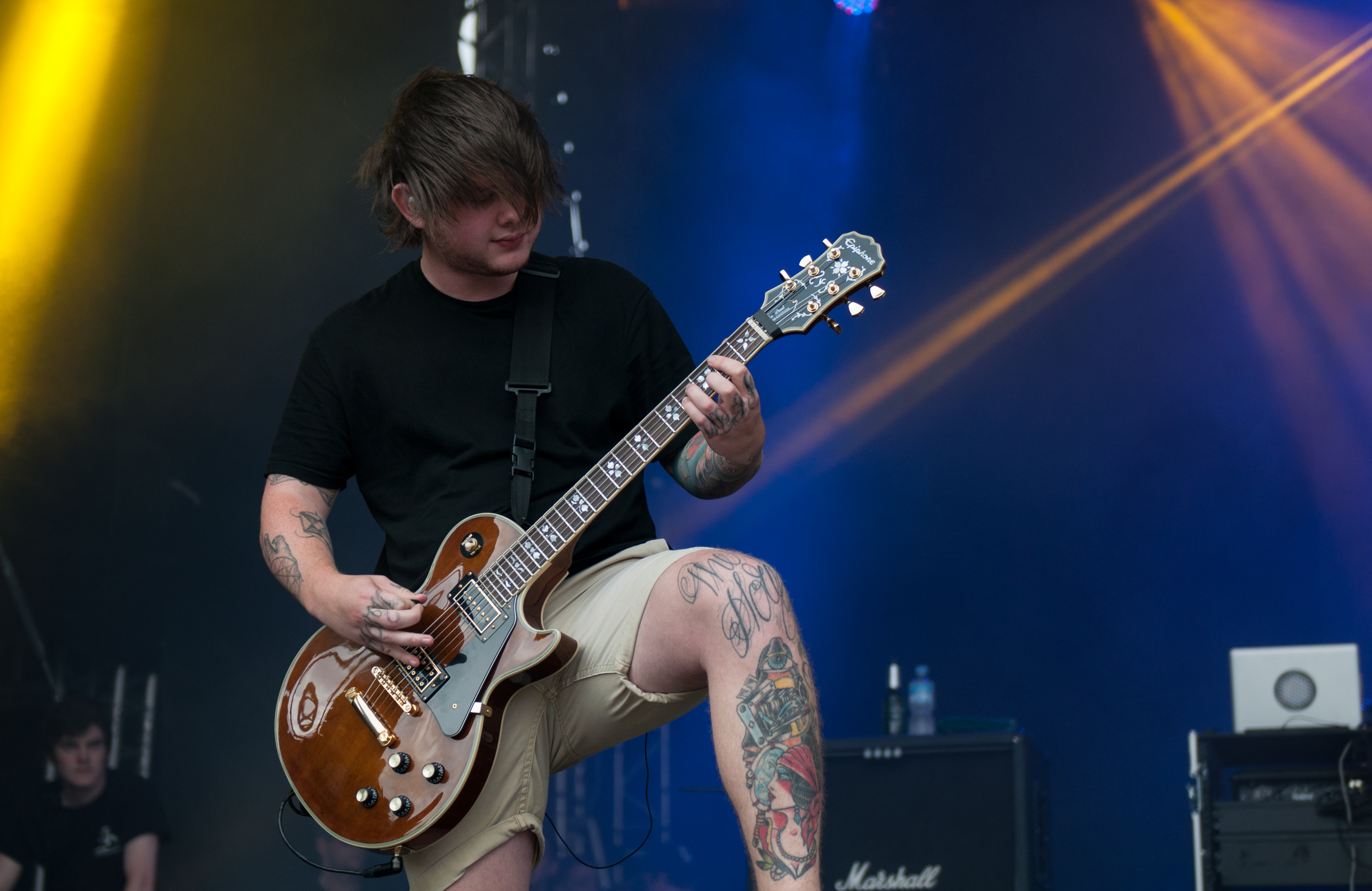
Malia performing in 2014

Malia joined Bring Me the Horizon in 2004, and they released their debut EP, This Is What the Edge of Your Seat Was Made For, later that year. The group released their debut studio album Count Your Blessings, on 30 October 2006. The album peaked at number 93 on the UK Albums Chart. Their second studio album, Suicide Season, was released in September 2008 and reached number 47 on the UK Albums Chart. On 4 October 2010, the group released their third studio album, There Is a Hell Believe Me I've Seen It. There Is a Heaven Let's Keep It a Secret. The album debuted at number 13 on the UK Albums Chart. Their fourth studio album, Sempiternal was released on 1 April 2013, with the album peaking at number three on the UK Albums Chart. The group's fifth studio album, That's the Spirit was released on 11 September 2015. The album peaked at number two on the UK Albums Chart. It also landed the band's first top ten in the US on the Billboard 200, reaching number two. Their sixth studio album, Amo was released on 25 January 2019. The album topped the UK Albums Chart. Their seventh studio album, Post Human: Nex Gen was released on 24 May 2024.

Outside from the band, Malia scored music for the 2017 horror thriller film Pyewacket, written and directed by Adam MacDonald. Malia was asked by MacDonald if he wanted to write the music for the film in which he did. Malia also felt that "writing a score was a lot less nerve-wracking than contributing to an album." Malia worked with MacDonald again in 2023, scoring music for the 2024 film, Out Come the Wolves.

== Equipment ==
Malia played an Ibanez that had thin and flat necks during the group's earlier years. However, as the band "started playing riffy stuff," he switched to Epiphone with a thicker neck because it fit the style he was writing in. In the studio, he plays a Les Paul Standard, the First Act Sheena and a semihollow Rickenbacker, while on stage, he uses his Les Paul Standard and a Les Paul Supreme. His Les Paul Standard is used for drop-A# tuning, whereas his Les Paul Traditional is used for C-standard tuning. His setup also includes a 1982 Gibson Victory MVX and a 1979 Gibson The Paul. Epiphone has created three signature guitars for Malia. In 2014, Epiphone introduced Malia's Les Paul Custom, which was inspired by the Gibson Artisan from the '70s with changes to the pickups. Malia revealed that a worker of Gibson made a suggestion to Epiphone to create the custom. In 2017, Epiphone launched Malia's Custom Explorer Artisan, which was inspired by James Hetfield. Epiphone also released Malia's Custom RD Artisan Outfit. On their latest record, Post Human: Survival Horror, Malia used a PRS baritone and an Ibanez. In September 2022, Jackson Guitars launched an American Series Soloist custom for Malia. In April 2025, Jackson Guitars released Malia's signature LM-87 guitar. Malia originally wanted to base his model off a Gibson Firebird. However, worried that he and Jackson Guitars would get sued by the company, he decided base his guitar off an old Charvel Surfcaster.

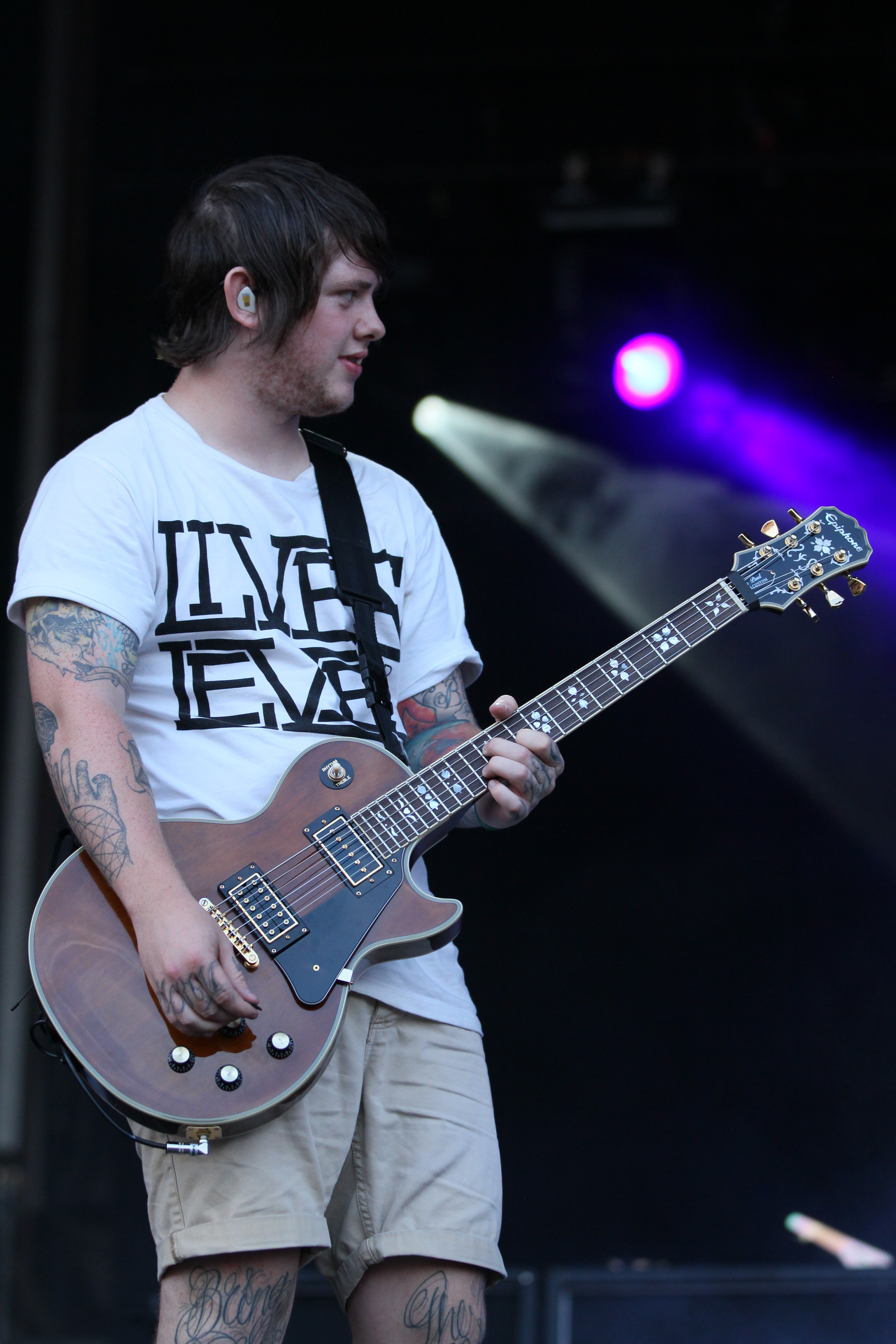
Malia with his signature Les Paul Custom.

Malia uses a variety of Marshall amplifiers. Malia uses a JCM800 with a Marshall speaker cabinet. He also owns a Marshall DSL1C, 1960AV and 1960BV, and a Marshall 1936. Additionally, he has used an Orange Rockerverb 100 and Rockerverb 50 amp. In the past, he used the JCM800 for both clean and distortion but as of 2019, Malia uses the Marshall JTM45 for cleans and the JCM800 for distortion. His pedalboard consists of a Boss Boss DD-7 Delay, an RV-5 Reverb, an Electro-Harmonix Cathedral Reverb and a Tube Screamer. Along with that, he has two Strymon pedals for delay and reverb. On the band's records after Suicide Season, Malia uses a Klon Centaur overdrive pedal, but when performing live, he uses a Fulltone OCD Overdrive, due to the Klon Centaur being "hard to get a hold of," according to Malia. He uses an Ernie Ball custom .080-gauge guitar strings. On recording There Is a Hell Believe Me I've Seen It. There Is a Heaven Let's Keep It a Secret., he used his First Act Custom Sheena guitar, a 5150 rig for distortion and an Orange Rockerverb 100 for cleans.

== Musical styles and influences ==
Malia listened to a lot of classic rock and metal growing up because of his dad, from the Eagles to Dire Straits and Metallica, which inspired him to start playing guitar. He credits "Enter Sandman" and "Master of Puppets" as the first few songs he wanted to learn when he first started out. He also credited Metallica on how he utilized his picking technique. When the band began playing heavier stuff, his style of playing was influenced by Cannibal Corpse, whose influence can be heard on their early albums such as Count Your Blessings and Suicide Season.

Malia cites early influences from Metallica and Pantera, before drawing heavier influences from Cannibal Corpse. Other influences he has noted include Gary Moore, Bon Iver, Justin Vernon, Sigur Rós and Rage Against the Machine.

== Personal life ==
In June 2017, he married long-time partner Deni Marie McGonigle.

== Discography ==
=== Film score ===
- Pyewacket (2017)
- Out Come the Wolves (2024)
- This Is Not a Test (2025)

=== Bring Me the Horizon ===
Studio albums

- Count Your Blessings (2006)
- Suicide Season (2008)
- There Is a Hell Believe Me I've Seen It. There Is a Heaven Let's Keep It a Secret. (2010)
- Sempiternal (2013)
- That's the Spirit (2015)
- Amo (2019)
- Post Human: Nex Gen (2024)

== Accolades ==
Publication	Accolade	Year	Rank	Ref.
MusicRadar	14 Best Metal Guitarists	2018	6	
