= Matt Nicholls =

British drummer (born 1986)

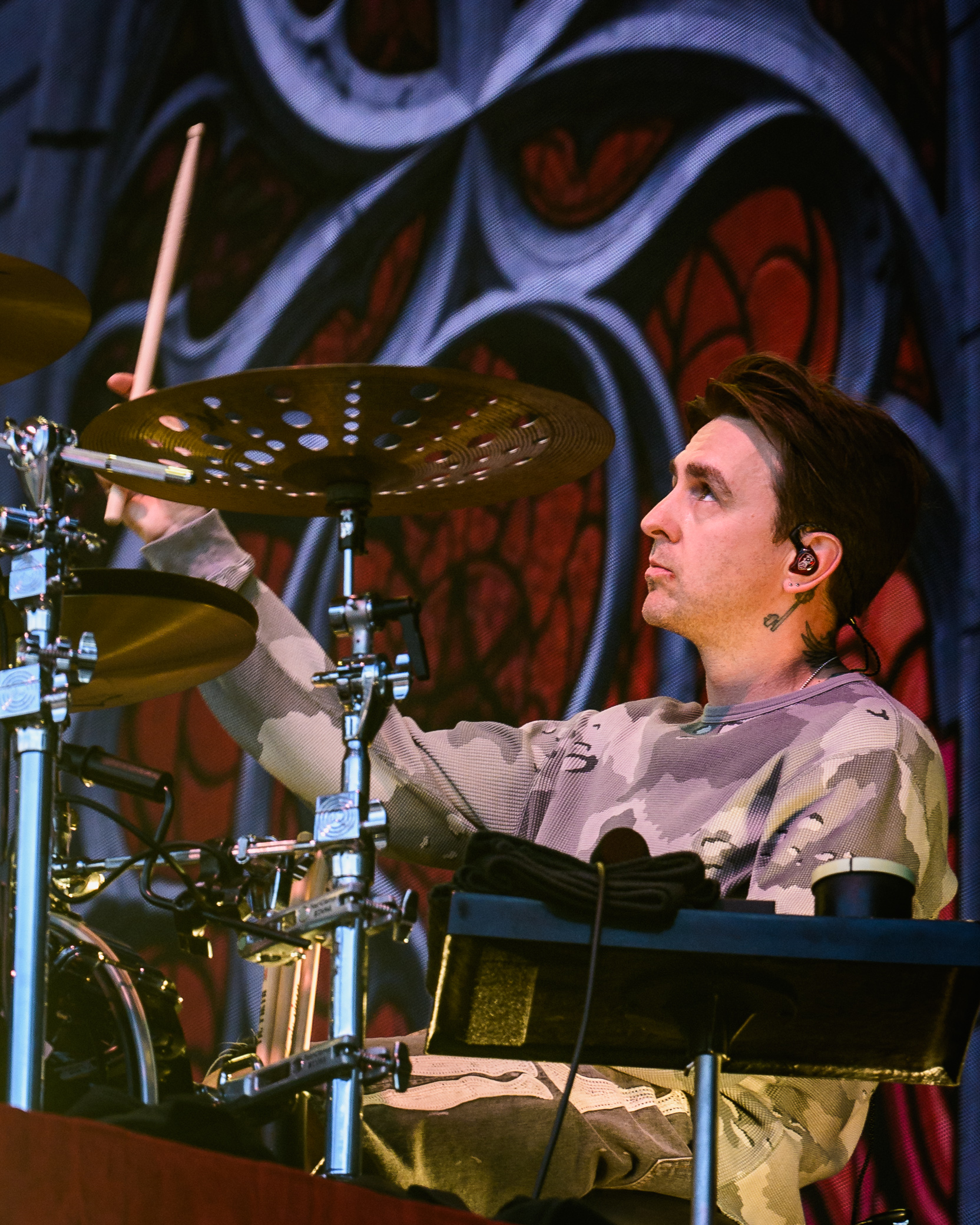
- Nicholls at Tons of Rock in 2026

Background information
- Also known as: Mat Nicholls
- Born: Matthew Stephen Nicholls; 22 March 1986 (age 40); Rotherham, South Yorkshire, England
- Genres: Metalcore; alternative metal; alternative rock; post-hardcore; pop rock; electronic rock; deathcore (early)
- Occupation: Musician
- Instrument: Drums
- Years active: 2000–present
- Member of: Bring Me the Horizon

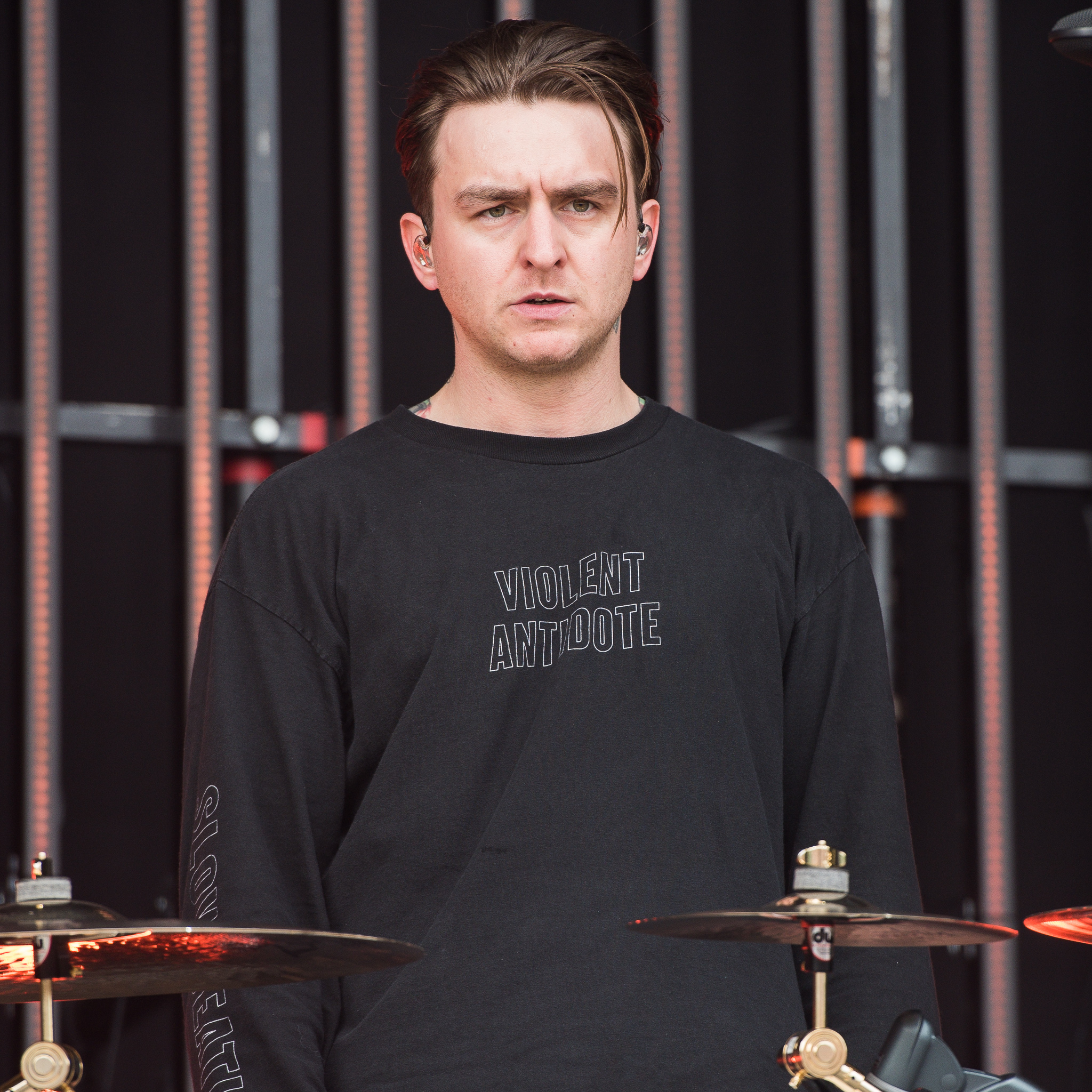
Nicholls in 2016

Matthew Stephen Nicholls (born 22 March 1986) is a British musician, best known as the drummer of the rock band Bring Me the Horizon. He is featured on all seven of the band's studio releases.

== Early life ==
Nicholls was born on 22 March 1986 in Rotherham, South Yorkshire, where he was raised. His parents divorced and his father gained custody of him and bought him a drum kit. Nicholls is a self-taught drummer. As he was learning how to play drums, Nicholls stated that he was never "influenced by drummers" rather, he listened to CDs and followed along with what they played. He also never had plans to be a drummer and never took drums seriously until he was 18 when Bring Me the Horizon started. His mother also wanted him to get a day-job instead of pursuing music, but Nicholls wasn't so keen to the idea. When he lived in his apartment block, he was never able to play drums because he was surrounded by other people complaining, so he could only play drums when he was playing at shows. Nicholls played in the mock hip-hop group Womb 2 Da Tomb with fellow Bring Me the Horizon member Oliver Sykes and Sykes' brother Tom.

== Career ==
Bring Me the Horizon formed in March 2004, and the band released their debut EP, This Is What the Edge of Your Seat Was Made For, that same year. Their debut studio album, Count Your Blessings was released on 30 October 2006. The album peaked at number 93 on the UK Albums Chart. Their second studio album, Suicide Season was released on 29 September 2008. The album reached number 47 on the UK Albums Chart. Their third studio album, There Is a Hell Believe Me I've Seen It. There Is a Heaven Let's Keep It a Secret was released on 4 October 2010, and debuted at number 13 on the UK Albums Chart. The group toured in the UK in support of the album, however, Nicholls broke his hand and was unable to continue for the remainder of the tour and Dan Searle of Architects filled in for him. He returned to the group later that year in September and joined them on their headlining American tour. Their fourth studio album, Sempiternal was released on 1 April 2013, peaking at number three on the UK Albums Chart. The group's fifth studio album, That's the Spirit was released on 11 September 2015. The album peaked at number two on the UK Albums Chart, as well as number two on the Billboard 200, making it the band's first top ten in the US. Their sixth studio album, Amo was released on 25 January 2019. The album peaked at number one on the UK Albums Chart. Their seventh studio album, Post Human: Nex Gen was released on 24 May 2024.

In 2019, Music Radar named Nicholls as the tenth best rock drummer. In October 2021, Nicholls made an appearance on BBC Breakfast, giving drumming advice for a 24-hour drumathon program for Children in Need.

== Equipment ==
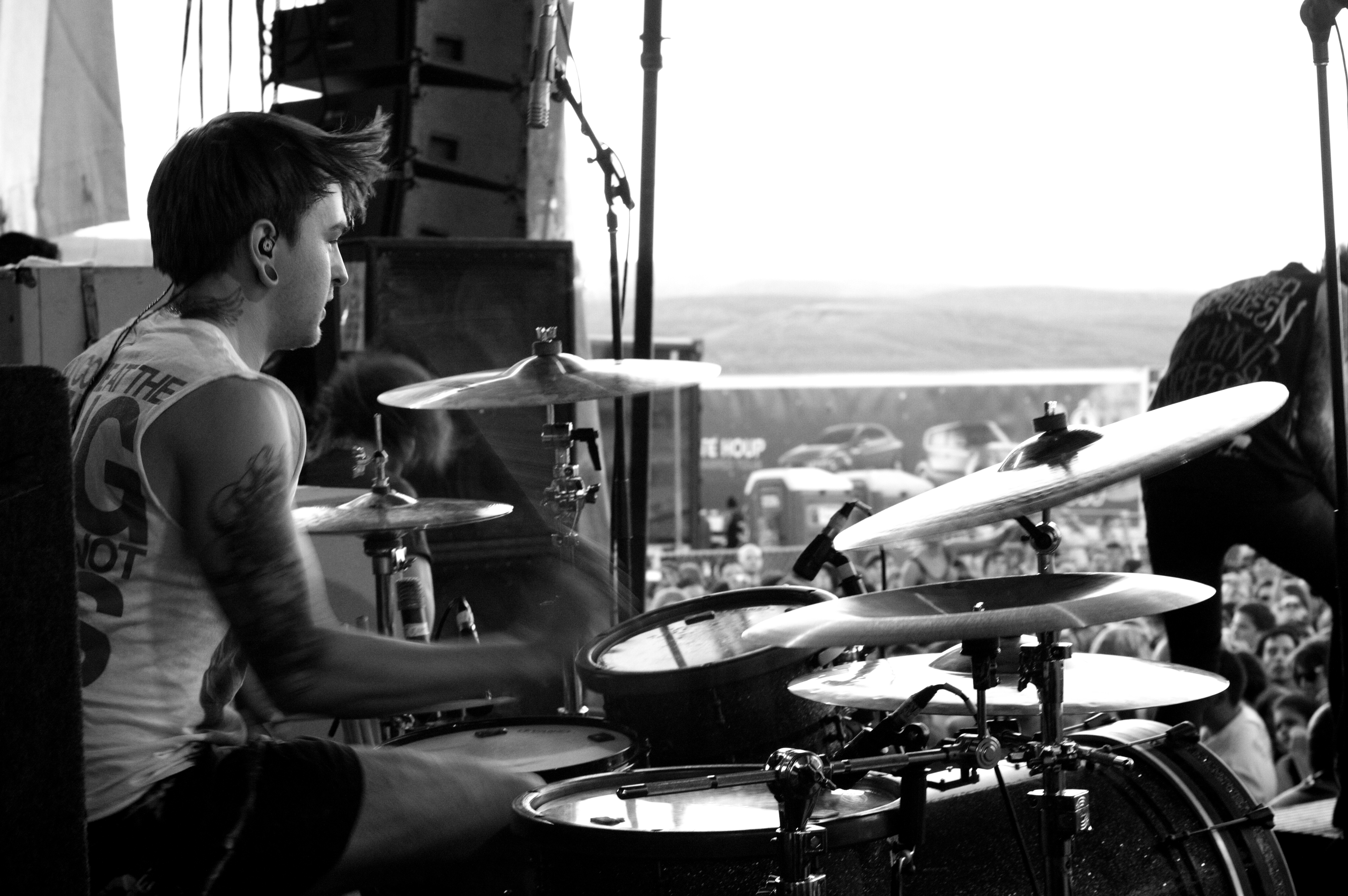
Nicholls performing at the 2010 Warped Tour

Nicholls owned a Pearl Export drum kit, which he used for recording on their first album Count Your Blessings. Following the release of that album, he bought a Tama Starclassic, which he used for recording on the group's next four albums. While performing live, Nicholls uses a SJC drum set, which he has been playing since 2008. His double pedal kit consists of a Joey Jordison Signature Export kit and the Speed Cobra brand. Nicholls owns a Roland drum kit that he uses to play and learn stuff on at home. He also had a gong drum which SJC made for him. Nicholls owns a variety of snares, including his main Vinnie Paul snare, a Pearl snare and an SJC snare. He also has a 14" Black Brass and a 13" G Maple.

Nicholls has a 16" and 18" floor toms, as well as a 22"x16" kick drum to fit the "faster metal stuff" the band plays. He has a pair of closed hats that is a part of his set up on the right side of his kit. He prefers to mix his cymbals set up while he plays. He used to own a China cymbal when the band was playing heavier music, but has since gotten rid of it. On That's the Spirit, Nicholls uses an 18" A Custom EFX cymbal and an A Custom Rezo crash cymbal. He also uses his Zildjian Gen16 cymbals. As of 2019, Nicholls uses an 18" EFX and the 21" Special Dry Trash Crash. Nicholls plays with Vic Firth sticks. Nicholls' set up was inspired by Abe Cunningham from Deftones. Since the band added electronics into their music, Nicholls plays to a click using his SPD-S.

== Playing style and technique ==
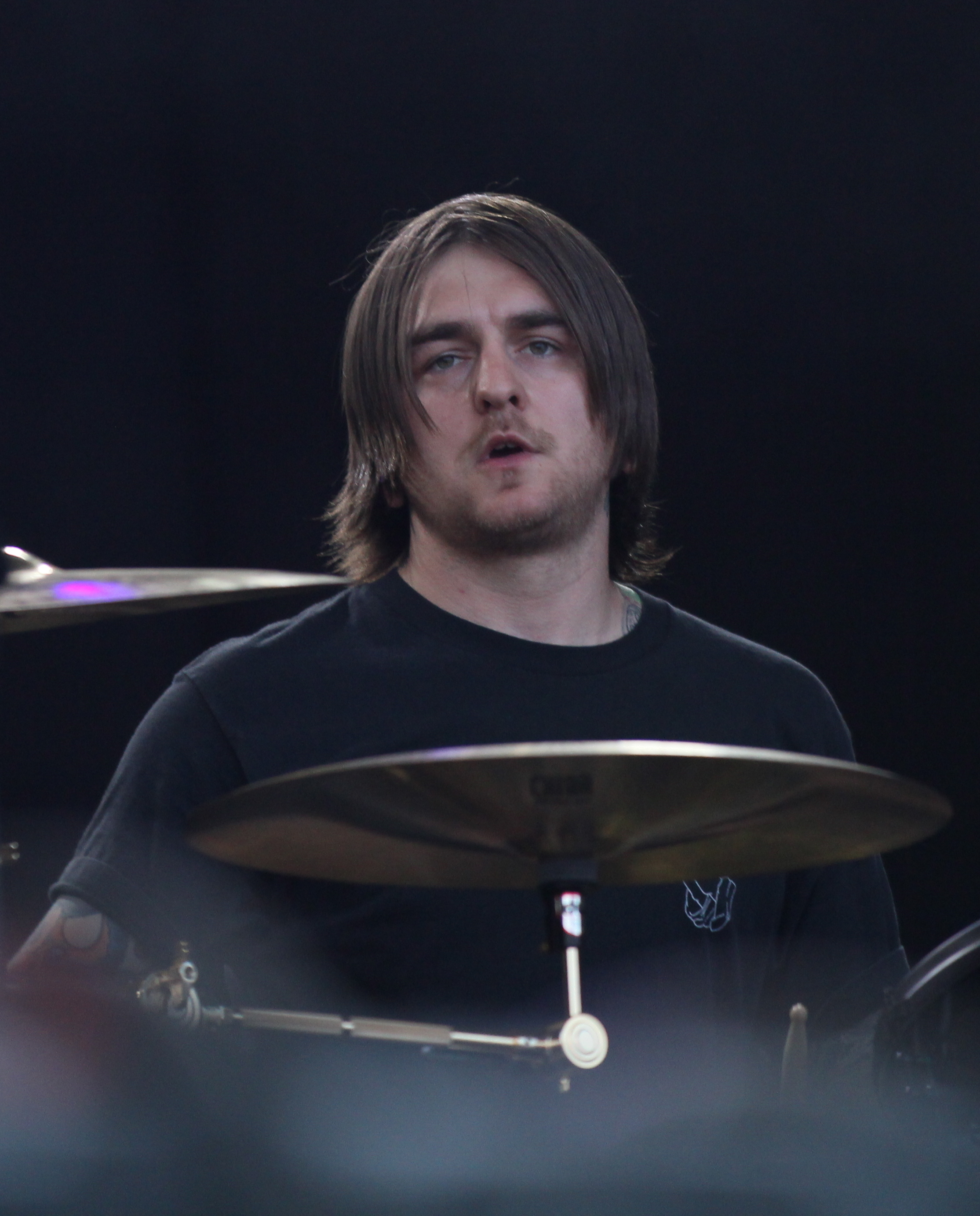
Nicholls in 2014.

At first, Nicholls didn't learn "the proper way to drum," such as playing chops or grooves. When the band recorded Count Your Blessings, he considered himself to be "really frantic and trying to be as metal as possible," doing things he couldn't pull off at the time. His style consisted of fast playing, influenced by Swedish metal. Throughout the years, Nicholls developed a more solid technique, playing "more controlled, more chilled, more complimenting of the music," giving a complex and diverse style. Speaking more about his technique, he considers his right hand to be good but his left hand a bit stiff. He bought a Korg Beatlab to build on his left hand, practising single strokes to get used to playing like his right hand. Nicholls also uses an EZdrummer software to work on fills and other drum parts. In the early years he would play over a lick and add a beat and fill over it. Nicholls "hated" playing to a click at first as he couldn't figure out how to play along with it, but decided to give it another chance on the band's third studio album, There Is a Hell Believe Me I've Seen It. There Is a Heaven Let's Keep It a Secret. He credits the click on him playing better on drums. On the band's 2019 album Amo, his style focused on more grooves and more hi-hat work.

== Personal life ==
Nicholls has been diagnosed with ADD. He is a football fan and supports EFL League Two club Rotherham United. In August 2022, Nicholls partook in the Allerthorpe Sprint Triathlon along with bandmate Oli Sykes, to raise money for LGBTQ+ charity, UKRAINEPRIDE. In February 2025, Nicholls sponsored the football club Maltby Main, after he was invited by school friend and club chairman Kieron White. He also designed and launched a range of merchandise for the team.

== Discography ==
=== Bring Me the Horizon ===
Studio albums

- Count Your Blessings (2006)
- Suicide Season (2008)
- There Is a Hell Believe Me I've Seen It. There Is a Heaven Let's Keep It a Secret. (2010)
- Sempiternal (2013)
- That's the Spirit (2015)
- Amo (2019)
- Post Human: Nex Gen (2024)

== Accolades ==
Publication	Accolade	Year	Rank	Ref.
MusicRadar	Best Rock Drummer	2019	10	
