= Zakk Cervini =

American record producer (born 1993)

- Born: Zachary Joseph Cervini; June 2, 1993 (age 33); Monroe, Connecticut, U.S.
- Genres: Rock; pop; heavy metal; metalcore; alternative rock
- Occupations: Record producer; mixing engineer; songwriter
- Years active: 2008–present

Zachary Joseph Cervini (born June 2, 1993) is an American record producer, songwriter, and mixing engineer. Cervini's work includes collaborations with Simple Plan, Limp Bizkit, Blink-182, Parkway Drive, All Time Low, Machine Gun Kelly, Yungblud, Bring Me the Horizon, Evanescence, 5 Seconds of Summer, Avicii, Halsey, Three Days Grace, Poppy, Bad Omens, Architects, Waterparks, and Sleeping with Sirens. His work on Blink-182's California landed him his first Grammy Nomination for Best Rock Album in the 59th Annual Grammy Awards.

== Career ==
Born June 2, 1993, Cervini is from Monroe, Connecticut and first gained interest in production and engineering aged 14. At that age he played guitar, produced with Audacity, and recorded songs with local bands in high school.

Later, he attended Drexel University in Philadelphia to study recording and producing. There, he messaged lots of people to try to work with, and eventually met producers Will Putney and Machine who both began to teach him production techniques and introduced him to John Feldmann, for whom he then became an intern and moved to Los Angeles at the age of 19. He worked as Feldmann's assistant, and in 2015, following a medical emergency for Feldmann, Cervini produced and edited his first album, Disobedient by Stick to Your Guns, proving his talent to Feldmann with whom he went on to co-produce much of his work.

== Discography ==
Cervini has produced, mixed, mastered, and engineered for numerous artists including Bring Me the Horizon, Poppy, Bad Omens, Motionless in White, Architects, Spiritbox, Three Days Grace, and Evanescence.

== Awards and nominations ==
=== APRA Awards ===
The APRA Awards are held in Australia and New Zealand by the Australasian Performing Right Association to recognise songwriting skills, sales and airplay performance by its members annually.

Year	Nominee / work	Award	Result	Ref.
2026	"Sacred" by Parkway Drive (Benjamin Gordon / Luke Kilpatrick / Jeffrey Ling / Winston McCall / Zachary Cervini / Jordan Fish)	Most Performed Hard Rock / Heavy Metal Work	Nominated	

=== Grammy Awards ===
The Grammy Award is an award presented by The Recording Academy to recognize achievement in the mainly English-language music industry. Cervini received one nomination for his involvement.

Year	Nominated work	Award	Result
2017	California	Best Rock Album	Nominated

=== Other Awards ===
Awards and nominations for "End of You"
Year	Award ceremony	Category	Result	Ref.
2025	Nik Nocturnal Awards	Collab Song of the Year	Won	
2025	Revolver Magazine	Song of the Year	Won	

=== Record certifications ===
Title	Year	Certification
5 Seconds of Summer	2015	RIAA: Gold
California	2017	RIAA: Gold
"11 Minutes" (featuring Halsey & Travis Barker)	2019	RIAA: Gold
"Monsters"	2019	RIAA: Gold; MC: Platinum
