= Beartooth discography =

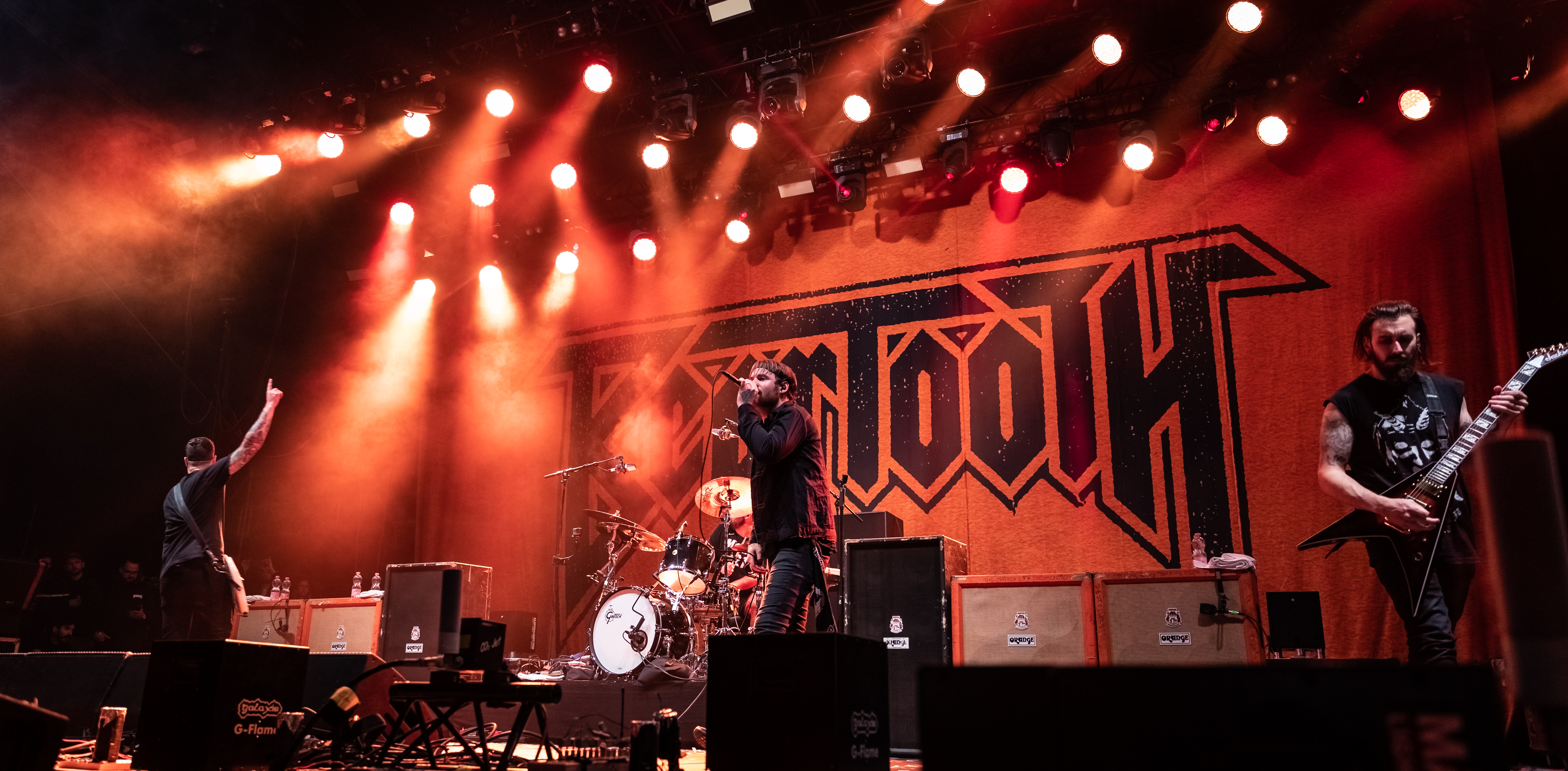
- Beartooth performing at Rock am Ring in 2019.
- Studio albums: 6
- EPs: 3
- Singles: 29
- Music videos: 26

This is the discography of American rock band Beartooth. They have released six studio albums, three extended plays, twenty-nine singles and twenty-six music videos. Their debut studio album, Disgusting, was released on June 10, 2014. The album contains the single, "In Between", which was certified platinum by the RIAA. Their second studio album, Aggressive, was released on June 3, 2016. They released their third studio album, Disease, on September 28, 2018. Their fourth studio album, Below, on June 25, 2021. On October 13, 2023, they released their fifth studio album, The Surface. On August 28, 2026, their sixth studio album Pure Ecstasy, was released.

The group has earned three number-one singles on the US Mainstream Rock Airplay chart, "Might Love Myself", "I Was Alive" and "Cut the Line", the latter they were featured on by Papa Roach. Internationally, Beartooth has earned itself six number-one Hits on Germany's Alternative Rock Songs chart. "Hated", "Disease", "Fire", "You Never Know", "Afterall", "The Past Is Dead".

== Studio albums ==
List of studio albums, with selected chart positions and sales figures
Title	Details	Peak chart positions										Sales
Title	Details	US	US Hard Rock	AUS	AUT	CAN	GER	SCO	SWI	UK	UK Rock	Sales
Disgusting	Released: June 10, 2014; Label: Red Bull, UNFD; Formats: CD, LP, DL	48	6	—	—	—	—	—	—	197	20	US: 63,000
Aggressive	Released: June 3, 2016; Label: Red Bull, UNFD; Formats: CD, LP, DL	25	3	18	41	28	80	26	57	35	2	US: 16,000
Disease	Released: September 28, 2018; Label: Red Bull, UNFD; Formats: CD, LP, CT, DL	40	1	66	33	83	49	41	67	55	3	US: 10,025
Below	Released: June 25, 2021; Label: Red Bull; Formats: CD, LP, CT, DL	30	2	42	18	100	10	16	36	39	3	US: 16,000
The Surface	Released: October 13, 2023; Label: Red Bull; Formats: CD, LP, CT, DL	42	1	—	38	—	24	24	42	— (Note: The Surface did not enter the UK Albums Chart, but peaked at number 22 on the UK Album Sales chart.)	4	US: 91,000
Pure Ecstasy	Released: August 28, 2026; Label: Fearless; Formats: CD, LP, CT, DL	114	9	21	40	—	39	—	—	— (Note: Pure Ecstasy did not enter the UK Albums Chart, but peaked at number 32 on the UK Album Downloads Chart.)	12	
"—" denotes a recording that did not chart or was not released in that territory.

== Extended plays ==
List of extended plays, with selected chart positions
Title	Details	Peak chart positions
Title	Details	UK Vinyl
Sick	Released: July 26, 2013; Formats: CD, DL	—
B-Sides	Released: May 10, 2019; Label: Red Bull; Formats: DL	39
The Blackbird Session	Released: September 13, 2019; Label: Red Bull; Formats: DL	—
"—" denotes a recording that did not chart or was not released in that territory.

== Singles ==
=== As lead artist ===
List of singles as lead artist, with selected chart positions and certifications, showing year released and album name
Title	Year	Peak chart positions					Certifications	Album
Title	Year	US Christian Rock	US Hard Rock	US Rock	US Main.	GER Alt.	Certifications	Album
"I Have a Problem"	2013	—	—	—	—	—		Sick
"Beaten in Lips"	2014	27	—	—	33	—		Disgusting
"The Lines"	2014	28	—	—	—	—		Disgusting
"In Between"	2015	26	—	—	20	—	RIAA: Platinum; MC: Gold	Disgusting
"Aggressive"	2016	11	— (Note: "Aggressive" did not enter the US Hot Hard Rock Songs chart, but peaked at number 19 on the US Hard Rock Digital Song Sales chart.)	—	34	—		Aggressive
"Always Dead"	2016	—	—	—	—	—		Aggressive
"Loser"	2016	—	—	—	—	—		Aggressive
"Hated"	2016	—	—	36	6	1	RIAA: Gold	Aggressive
"Sick of Me"	2017	—	—	— (Note: "Sick of Me" did not enter the US Hot Rock & Alternative Songs chart, but peaked at number 48 on the US Rock & Alternative Airplay component chart.)	16	4		Aggressive
"Bad Listener"	2018	—	—	—	—	—		Disease
"Disease"	2018	—	—	35	9	1		Disease
"Manipulation"	2018	—	—	—	—	—		Disease
"You Never Know"	2019	—	—	— (Note: "You Never Know" did not enter the US Hot Rock & Alternative Songs chart, but peaked at number 49 on the US Rock & Alternative Airplay component chart.)	16	1		Disease
"Afterall"	2019	—	—	—	—	1		Disease
"Devastation"	2021	—	18	—	—	—		Below
"The Past Is Dead"	2021	—	19	— (Note: "The Past Is Dead" did not enter the US Hot Rock & Alternative Songs chart, but peaked at number 39 on the US Rock & Alternative Airplay component chart.)	14	1		Below
"Hell of It"	2021	—	—	—	—	—		Below
"Fed Up"	2021	—	—	—	—	—		Below
"Skin"	2021	—	—	—	23	—		Below
"Riptide"	2022	—	19	— (Note: "Riptide" did not enter the US Hot Rock & Alternative Songs chart, but peaked at number 29 on the US Rock & Alternative Airplay component chart.)	11	—		The Surface
"Sunshine!"	2023	—	17	—	—	—		The Surface
"Might Love Myself"	2023	—	8	— (Note: "Might Love Myself" did not enter the US Hot Rock & Alternative Songs chart, but peaked at number 11 on the US Rock & Alternative Airplay component chart.)	1	—		The Surface
"Doubt Me"	2023	—	—	—	—	—		The Surface
"The Better Me" (featuring Hardy)	2023	—	13	—	—	—		The Surface
"I Was Alive"	2023	—	10	— (Note: "I Was Alive" did not enter the US Hot Rock & Alternative Songs chart, but peaked at number 13 on the US Rock & Alternative Airplay component chart.)	1	—		The Surface
"ATTN."	2024	—	18	—	—	—		The Surface
"Free"	2026	—	10	—	6	—		Pure Ecstasy
"Pure Ecstasy"	2026	—	19	—	—	—		Pure Ecstasy
"Bullshit"	2026	—	18	—	—	—		Pure Ecstasy
"Eyes Closed"	2026	—	—	—	—	—		Pure Ecstasy
"Beautiful Again"	2026	—	14	—	14	—		Pure Ecstasy
"—" denotes a release that did not chart or was not released in that territory.

=== As featured artist ===
List of singles as featured artist, with selected chart positions, showing year released and album name
Title	Year	Peak chart positions		Album
Title	Year	US Hard Rock	US Main.	Album
"Cut the Line" (Papa Roach featuring Beartooth)	2023	19	1	Ego Trip
"Everything Burns" (Tom Morello featuring Beartooth)	2025	16	34	Final Fantasy XIV

=== Other charted songs ===
Title	Year	Peak chart positions		Album
Title	Year	US Hard Rock	GER Alt.	Album
"Fire"	2018	—	1	Disease
"The Surface"	2023	24	—	The Surface

== Music videos ==
Title	Year	Director
"I Have a Problem" (live video)	2013	Mark C. Eshleman
"I Have a Problem"	2013	Mark C. Eshleman
"Pick Your Poison" (live video)	2013	Johnny Hochstetler
"Go Be the Voice"	2013	DJay Brawner
"Dead" (live video)	2014	Johnny Hochstetler
"Beaten in Lips"	2014	Drew Russ
"The Lines"	2014	Drew Russ
"Body Bag" (live video)	2014	Johnny Hochstetler
"In Between"	2015	Drew Russ
"Aggressive"	2016	Drew Russ
"Hated"	2016	Jeb Hardwick
"Sick of Me"	2017	Marc Klasfeld
"Disease"	2018	Drew Russ
"You Never Know"	2019	Wyatt Clough
"Afterall"	2019	Wyatt Clough
"The Past Is Dead"	2021	Wyatt Clough
"Devastation"	2021	Wyatt Clough
"Skin"	2021	Wyatt Clough
"Riptide"	2022	Dylan Marko Bell
"Might Love Myself"	2023	Val Vega
"Doubt Me"	2023	Zebulon Griffin
"I Was Alive"	2023	Zebulon Griffin
"ATTN."	2024	Zebulon Griffin
"Free"	2026	Megan Gámez
"Pure Ecstasy"	2026	Zebulon Griffin
"Eyes Closed"	2026	Zebulon Griffin
"Beautiful Again"	2026	Zebulon Griffin

== Compilation appearances ==
Title	Year	Album	Ref.
"I Have a Problem"	2014	Warped Tour 2014 Tour Compilation	
"Dead"	2015	Warped Tour 2015 Tour Compilation	
"Sick of It All" (Disgusting b-side)	2015	Red Bull: 20 Before 16	
