= The Lines (song) =

Single by Beartooth

from the album Disgusting
- Released: September 29, 2014
- Genre: Metalcore
- Length: 3:47 (Album Version); 3:01 (Low Gain Mix)
- Label: Red Bull; UNFD
- Songwriter: Caleb Shomo
- Producer: Shomo

Beartooth singles chronology
| "Beaten in Lips" (2014) | "The Lines" (2014) | "In Between" (2015) |

Music video
- "The Lines" on YouTube

"The Lines" is a song by American rock band Beartooth. The song first premiered on May 27, 2014, for streaming as a promotional single. A music video was also released on August 11. It was officially released as the second single from their debut studio album, Disgusting, on September 29.

== Background and composition ==
On May 27, 2014, the group released "The Lines" for streaming via Revolver, from their forthcoming debut studio album, Disgusting. The track was written and produced by Caleb Shomo. A low gain mix version of the song was included in the deluxe edition of their first album.

== Live performances ==
The group performed the track at the 2014 Vans Warped Tour. A live video of the band performing the song in London, which was filmed in February 2020, premiered on May 14, 2020, as part of their Re-Live at Home series. In March 2022, the song was featured on the deluxe edition of their fourth studio album, Below, titled "The Lines (Live From the Journey Below)".

== Music video ==
The music video for "The Lines" premiered on August 11, 2014, and was directed by Drew Russ. The video opens up with the group "starring" in Smashing Stuff in Slow Motion is Cool, visually showing the members smashing various objects and food.

== Track listing ==
CD single
| No. | Title | Length |
|---|---|---|
| 1. | "The Lines" | 3:47 |

Digital download
| No. | Title | Length |
|---|---|---|
| 1. | "The Lines" (music video) | 3:47 |

== Personnel ==
Credits for "The Lines" adapted from album's liner notes.

- Caleb Shomo – vocals, all instruments, producer, mixing, engineering
- Ted Jensen – mastering

== Charts ==
Chart performance for "The Lines"
| Chart (2014) | Peak position |
|---|---|
| US Christian Rock Songs (Billboard) | 28 |

== Release history ==
Release history for "The Lines"
| Region | Date | Format | Label | Ref. |
|---|---|---|---|---|
| Various | September 29, 2014 | Digital download; streaming | Red Bull; UNFD | |
