= In Between (Beartooth song) =

Single by Beartooth

from the album Disgusting
- Released: April 7, 2015
- Genre: Hardcore punk; metalcore
- Length: 3:33
- Label: Red Bull; UNFD
- Songwriter: Caleb Shomo
- Producers: John Feldmann; Shomo

Beartooth singles chronology
| "The Lines" (2014) | "In Between" (2015) | "Aggressive" (2015) |

Music video
- "In Between" on YouTube

"In Between" is a song by American rock band Beartooth. It first premiered on May 30, 2014, via Alternative Press as a promotional single. The song was later released as the third and final single from their debut studio album, Disgusting. The song peaked at number 20 on the US Mainstream Rock chart. The music video was released on April 7, 2015. "In Between" was certified platinum by the Recording Industry Association of America in September 2024.

== Composition ==
"In Between" was written and produced by Caleb Shomo. John Feldmann also helped produce the track with Shomo. The song's chorus has been described as more "pop-oriented."

== Release ==
On May 30, 2014, Beartooth released "In Between" for streaming as a promotional single, ahead of the release of their debut studio album, Disgusting. It was released as a single on April 7, 2015. The song was serviced for radio airplay on April 28, and had a CD release in the United States and United Kingdom that same year. In March 2022, the song was featured on the deluxe edition of their fourth studio album, Below, titled "In Between (Live From the Journey Below)".

== Critical reception ==
A staff writer for Ultimate Guitar said the song was an "ambiguous uplifter" and stated it came "off as formulaic in the lyrical aspect as they do in the sound aspect." Justin Mabee of HM described track as one of the more "poppier cuts" from Disgusting.

== Chart performance ==
"In Between" debuted at number 38 on the US Mainstream Rock chart on the week of June 6, 2015. The song peaked at number 20 and lasted 20 weeks on the chart. The song was certified platinum in the US in September 2024, by the Recording Industry Association of America. It was also certified gold in Canada by Music Canada in October 2022.

== Music video ==
The music video for "In Between" premiered on April 7, 2015, and was directed by Drew Russ. The video showcases Caleb Shomo alone in a secluded room and the band performing in the mountains. As the video progresses, Shomo is struggling and delves deeper into his own head before his bandmates arrive.

== Track listing ==
Digital download
| No. | Title | Length |
|---|---|---|
| 1. | "In Between" | 3:33 |

UK CD single
| No. | Title | Length |
|---|---|---|
| 1. | "In Between" (radio edit) | 3:35 |

US CD single
| No. | Title | Length |
|---|---|---|
| 1. | "In Between" (active rock mix) | 3:35 |

== Charts ==
Chart performance for "In Between"
| Chart (2015) | Peak position |
|---|---|
| US Christian Rock Songs (Billboard) | 26 |
| US Mainstream Rock (Billboard) | 20 |

== Certifications ==
Certifications for "In Between"
| Region | Certification | Certified units/sales |
|---|---|---|
| Canada (Music Canada) | Gold | 40,000^{‡} |
| United States (RIAA) | Platinum | 1,000,000^{‡} |
^{‡} Sales+streaming figures based on certification alone.

== Release history ==
Release dates and formats for "In Between"
| Region | Date | Format | Label | Ref. |
|---|---|---|---|---|
| Various | April 7, 2015 | Digital download | Red Bull; UNFD | |
| United States | April 28, 2015 | Active rock | Red Bull; UNFD | |
| United States | 2015 | CD | Red Bull; UNFD | |
| United Kingdom | 2015 | CD | Red Bull; UNFD | |
