= Disease (Beartooth song) =

Single by Beartooth

from the album Disease
- Released: July 24, 2018
- Recorded: February 2017
- Studio: BlackBird Studio (Franklin, Tennessee)
- Genre: Alternative rock
- Length: 3:48
- Label: Red Bull; UNFD
- Songwriters: Caleb Shomo; Felipe Magrini
- Producers: Nick Raskulinecz; Shomo

Beartooth singles chronology
"Bad Listener" (2018)	"Disease" (2018)	"Manipulation" (2018)

Music video
- "Disease" on YouTube

"Disease" is a song by American rock band Beartooth. It was released on July 24, 2018, as the third single from their third studio album, Disease. The song peaked at number nine on the US Mainstream Rock chart.

== Background ==
Following the release of their second studio album Aggressive in June 2016, the group embarked on The Aggressive Tour, including a European leg in December 2016. However, while the band was in Finland, lead vocalist Caleb Shomo began spiraling into a depression again and found himself struggling with his mental health. In the most desperate of moments, the concept for Disease came to him; the importance of acknowledging the black dog and confronting it head-on. Two months later, Shomo wrote the title track and began recording the song at BlackBird Studio in Franklin, Tennessee.

== Composition ==
"Disease" was written by Caleb Shomo and Felipe Magrini, while production was handled by Shomo and Nick Raskulinecz. Rhythm guitarist Kamron Bradbury and bassist Oshie Bichar provided additional production on the track. The song features the group's "darkest lyrics to date," where Shomo finds himself in despair but finding a way out in self-reflection and self-realization.

== Critical reception ==
Paul Brown of Wall of Sound stated, "This one shows more of the band's melodic side, but despite the easy-going chords playing along under Shomo's voice, you will no doubt find yourself bouncing along and singing at the top of your lungs during the climax."

== Chart performance ==
"Disease" debuted on the US Billboard Mainstream Rock chart at number 40 on the week of August 11, 2018. The song later peaked at number nine in December 2018, becoming the group's second top ten on the chart. The song also peaked at number 35 on the US Hot Rock & Alternative Songs and spent five weeks on the chart.

== Music video ==
The music video for "Disease" was released on July 24, 2018, and was directed by Drew Russ. The video was shot in eleven hours and Shomo spoke about the concept of the video with Alternative Press stating, "I wouldn't say it was last-minute, but we were able to put it together in five days or so. We feel Drew has done our best videos. He really understands us really well. I don't know: [the clip] is not too much about having a plot as much as it is capturing an emotion. There's lots of paint, blood, I'm dying... it gets pretty dark."

== Personnel ==
Credits for "Disease" adapted from album's liner notes.

- Caleb Shomo – vocals, all instruments, producer
- Nick Raskulinecz – producer
- Oshie Bichar – additional producer
- Kamron Bradbury – additional producer

== Charts ==
=== Weekly charts ===
Weekly chart performance for "Disease"
Chart (2018–19)	Peak position
Germany Alternative (Deutsche Alternative Charts)	1
US Hot Rock & Alternative Songs (Billboard)	35

=== Year-end charts ===
Year-end chart performance for "Disease"
Chart (2019)	Position
US Mainstream Rock (Billboard)	50

== Release history ==
Release history for "Disease"
Region	Date	Format	Label	Ref.
Various	July 24, 2018	Digital download; streaming	Red Bull; UNFD	
