= The Surface (album) =

Studio album by Beartooth
- Released: October 13, 2023
- Studios: Clubhouse West (Los Angeles); The Clubhouse (Columbus); Red Bull (Santa Monica)
- Genres: Alternative metal; metalcore; post-hardcore
- Length: 37:29
- Label: Red Bull
- Producer: Caleb Shomo

Beartooth chronology
Below (2021)	The Surface (2023)	Pure Ecstasy (2026)

Singles from The Surface
- 1. "Riptide" Released: July 12, 2022; 2. "Sunshine!" Released: April 21, 2023; 3. "Might Love Myself" Released: July 21, 2023; 4. "Doubt Me" Released: August 25, 2023; 5. "The Better Me" Released: September 15, 2023; 6. "I Was Alive" Released: October 13, 2023

Deluxe edition cover
- Artwork used for the deluxe edition cover

The Surface is the fifth studio album by American rock band Beartooth. The album was released on October 13, 2023, through Red Bull Records and was produced by Caleb Shomo. A deluxe edition of The Surface was released on September 20, 2024, with an additional 7 tracks.

== Background and promotion ==
On July 12, 2022, the band released the first single "Riptide" and an accompanying music video. On April 21, 2023, Beartooth unveiled the second single titled "Sunshine!". On July 21, the band released the third single "Might Love Myself" and its corresponding music video. At the same time, they officially announced the album itself and release date, whilst also revealing the album cover and the track list.

On August 25, the band released the fourth single "Doubt Me" along with a music video. On September 15, one month before the album release, the band released the fifth single "The Better Me" featuring Hardy. The music video for "I Was Alive" was released October 13, 2023, coinciding with the album release.

On September 20, 2024, the band released a music video for the song "ATTN." which was featured on the deluxe edition of The Surface which was also released on the same day as the music video.

== Critical reception ==
Professional ratings
Review scores
Source	Rating
AllMusic	4/5 stars
Blabbermouth.net	7.5/10
Distorted Sound	9/10
Dork	4/5 stars
Kerrang!	4/5 stars
Metal Hammer	4/5 stars
Riff	7/10
Spill Magazine	4/5 stars
Sputnikmusic	3.5/5
Wall of Sound	9/10

The Surface received generally positive reviews from critics. Anne Erickson of Blabbermouth.net called The Surface "an engaging album that takes some twists and turns...What's more, mixing more traditional metalcore, for which Beartooth are known, with dashes of country and straight-ahead rock make for a great blend, making The Surface a mesmerizing listen." Katie Bird of Distorted Sound stated that "Whilst a couple of the songs don't quite hit all the right notes, the rest of the album is masterful...The band do try new things, but these just hint at what's to come, which leaves the future open. Beartooth have come a long way since 2012, and it is a joy to see them finally finding the light after so long in the dark." Jake Richardson writing for Kerrang! considered the release to be "[...] a collection of tracks that are the best and most consistent Beartooth have ever sounded on record. The impression these songs make is instant, but scratch beneath the surface, and there's so much more to love about the heart, hurt and craft that has gone into this album."

Metal Hammer gave the album a positive review and stated that "As a whole, The Surface is a sharp, poignant and blazingly cathartic celebration of life, warts and all." Mike DeWald of Riff felt that Beartooth "[achieved] musical maturity and growth" with The Surface. Simon Crampton of Rock Sins stated, "They manage to make music that is deeply personal, excruciatingly honest, accessible, catchy as hell and still heavier than most of what their peers are doing. This is another instant classic from a band that seems incapable of delivering anything less." Melinda Welsh of Spill Magazine felt that lyrically, [Shomo shows] incredible strides on his journey to find a better version of himself." Paul Brown of Wall of Sound was positive towards the album saying: "the innovation [Caleb Shomo] has made through the storytelling of this Disgusting, Aggressive, Disease, Below, The Surface needs to be commended. The way he's taken us on an adventure of highs, and plenty of dark and twisted lows is nothing short of inspirational. By capping it all off with this closing chapter, we see a role model in the making hellbent on encouraging positive change in the world and the way we look at ourselves in the mirror."

== Commercial performance ==
The Surface debuted at number forty two on the US Billboard 200 with 17,000 album-equivalent units, and debuting No. 1 on the Billboard 'Top Hard Rock' albums chart. Their third single "Might Love Myself", was their first No. 1 single on the Billboard Mainstream Rock Airplay chart.

== Track listing ==
All tracks are written by Caleb Shomo, except where noted.

The Surface track listing
No.	Title	Writer(s)	Length
1.	"The Surface"		3:54
2.	"Riptide"		3:31
3.	"Doubt Me"		3:10
4.	"The Better Me" (featuring Hardy)		3:15
5.	"Might Love Myself"		3:39
6.	"Sunshine!"		3:18
7.	"What's Killing You"		3:52
8.	"Look the Other Way"	Shomo, Oshie Bichar	3:07
9.	"What Are You Waiting For"	Shomo, Drew Fulk	3:05
10.	"My New Reality"	Shomo, Richard Scarborough	3:20
11.	"I Was Alive"	Shomo, Fulk	3:18
Total length:			37:29

Deluxe edition bonus tracks
No.	Title	Length
12.	"ATTN."	3:23
13.	"Sunshine!" (Live in Sacramento)	3:19
14.	"Might Love Myself" (Live in Sacramento)	4:38
15.	"I Was Alive" (Live in Sacramento)	3:47
16.	"Might Love Myself" (Smooth Mix)	3:35
17.	"I Was Alive" (Low Gain Mix)	3:20
18.	"Look The Other Way" (Ambient Mix)	3:04
Total length:		62:35

== Personnel ==
Credits are adapted from the album's liner notes.

=== Beartooth ===
- Caleb Shomo – vocals
- Zach Huston – lead guitar
- Will Deely – rhythm guitar
- Oshie Bichar – bass
- Connor Denis – drums

=== Production ===
- Caleb Shomo – production, engineering, mastering, mixing
- Oshie Bichar – additional production
- James Musshorn – additional engineering
- Brandon Rike – creative direction, design
- Joel Cook – creative direction, design
- Nate Utesch – creative direction, design
- Vamuel – 3D art

== Charts ==
=== Weekly charts ===
Weekly chart performance for The Surface
Chart (2023)	Peak position
Austrian Albums (Ö3 Austria)	38
German Albums (Offizielle Top 100)	24
Scottish Albums (Official Charts)	24
Swiss Albums (Romandie)	42
UK Album Downloads (Official Charts)	19
UK Independent Albums (Official Charts)	12
US Billboard 200	42
US Independent Albums (Billboard)	7
US Top Hard Rock Albums (Billboard)	1
US Top Rock Albums (Billboard)	6

=== Year-end charts ===
Year-end chart performance for The Surface
Chart (2024)	Position
US Top Hard Rock Albums (Billboard)	50
