= Beaten in Lips =

Single by Beartooth

from the album Disgusting
- Released: May 13, 2014
- Genre: Post-hardcore
- Length: 3:33
- Label: Red Bull; UNFD
- Songwriter: Caleb Shomo
- Producer: Shomo

Beartooth singles chronology
"I Have a Problem" (2013)	"Beaten in Lips" (2014)	"The Lines" (2014)

Music video
- "Beaten in Lips" on YouTube

"Beaten in Lips" is a song by American rock band Beartooth. It was released on May 13, 2014, as the second single from their debut studio album, Disgusting. The song peaked at number 33 on the US Mainstream Rock chart and the US Christian Rock Songs chart at number 27.

Written and produced by Caleb Shomo, the song was nominated for Song of the Year at the 2015 Alternative Press Music Awards.

== Background ==
"Beaten in Lips" was released on May 13, 2014, the same day as pre-orders for their debut studio album, Disgusting. The song was nominated at the 2015 Alternative Press Music Awards for Song of the Year, but lost to Sleeping with Sirens's "Kick Me".

== Composition ==
"Beaten in Lips" was written and produced by Caleb Shomo. The song is described as an "anti-authoritarian track." In an interview with Alternative Press, Shomo spoke about the inspiration for writing the track stating, "I talk to people at shows I talk to people who tell me they've dealt with that, or that they deal with active abuse... That was a big inspiration — just seeing the sheer reality of it. If it's happening, you don't really hear about it. It's not something people want to talk about because they're ashamed or embarrassed. Some sick parents make their kids feel like they deserve it, which is horrifying. That's a very big reason I wrote the song. I guess if people are going to hear it, I'm going to tell them my view on it, straight up."

== Chart performance ==
"Beaten in Lips" peaked at number 33 on the US Mainstream Rock chart, becoming the group's first charting song. The song also reached the US Christian Rock Songs chart at number 27.

== Music video ==
The music video for "Beaten in Lips" was released on May 13, 2014, and was directed by Drew Russ.

== Awards and nominations ==
Awards and nominations for "Beaten in Lips"
Year	Organization	Award	Result	Ref(s)
2015	Alternative Press Music Awards	Song of the Year	Nominated	

== Charts ==
Chart performance for "Beaten in Lips"
Chart (2014)	Peak position
US Christian Rock Songs (Billboard)	27
US Mainstream Rock (Billboard)	33

== Release history ==
Release history for "Beaten in Lips"
Region	Date	Format	Label	Ref.
Various	May 13, 2014	Digital download; streaming	Red Bull; UNFD	
