= I Was Alive =

Single by Beartooth

from the album The Surface
- Released: October 13, 2023
- Genre: Hard rock
- Length: 3:18
- Label: Red Bull
- Songwriters: Caleb Shomo; Drew Fulk
- Producer: Shomo

Beartooth singles chronology
"The Better Me" (2023)	"I Was Alive" (2023)	"Attn" (2024)

Music video
- "I Was Alive" on YouTube

"I Was Alive" is a song by American rock band Beartooth. It was released on October 13, 2023, as the sixth and final single from their fifth studio album, The Surface. The song peaked at number one on the US Mainstream Rock chart, becoming the group's second number-one hit on the chart.

== Background and composition ==
"I Was Alive" was written by Caleb Shomo and Drew Fulk, while production was handled by Shomo. The song is a mid-tempo rock track, with uplifting lyrics as the main content of the song. Speaking about the song, Shomo stated it is "about the fact that none of this lasts forever and we get one ride on this crazy journey we're on, so we've got to give it everything we've got."

== Critical reception ==
Jake Richardson of Kerrang! stated that the song "delivers a carpe diem musical affirmation that reflects the newfound self-love that has engulfed its creators" and how "it's a far cry from the despair that characterised the band's celebrated debut album Disgusting. Anne Erickson of Blabbermouth.net noted how the track had "an anthemic, late-1990s rock quality" sound. Paul Brown of Wall of Sound expressed that the song "brings back some of those country/radio rock influences, whilst still retaining that new hard rock edge."

== Chart performance ==
"I Was Alive" topped the US Billboard Mainstream Rock chart for the week of May 11, 2024, becoming their second number-one song on the chart. The song also reached number one on the US Mediabase Active Rock radio chart for two weeks, as well as and peaking at number 13 on the US Rock Airplay chart. The song has earned 306,000 streams in the United States.

== Music video ==
The music video for "I Was Alive" premiered on October 13, 2023, and was directed by Zebulon.

== Personnel ==
Beartooth

- Caleb Shomo – lead vocals
- Zach Huston – lead guitar, backing vocals
- Will Deely – rhythm guitar, backing vocals
- Oshie Bichar – bass, backing vocals
- Connor Denis – drums, backing vocals

Production

- Caleb Shomo – production, mastering, mixing, engineering, composition, lyrics

== Charts ==
=== Weekly charts ===
Weekly chart performance for "I Was Alive"
Chart (2023–24)	Peak position
US Hot Hard Rock Songs (Billboard)	10
US Rock & Alternative Airplay (Billboard)	13

=== Year-end charts ===
Year-end chart performance for "I Was Alive"
Chart (2024)	Position
US Rock Airplay (Billboard)	46
