= The Past Is Dead =

Single by Beartooth

from the album Below
- B-side: "Skin"
- Released: March 25, 2021
- Recorded: 2020
- Studio: Capital House Studio, Columbus, Ohio, U.S.
- Genre: Rock; heavy metal
- Length: 3:36
- Label: Red Bull
- Songwriters: Caleb Shomo; Zach Huston; Will Deely; Oshie Bichar; Connor Denis
- Producers: Caleb Shomo; Oshie Bichar

Beartooth singles chronology
"Devastation" (2021)	"The Past Is Dead" (2021)	"Hell of It" (2021)

Music video
- "The Past Is Dead" on YouTube

"The Past Is Dead" is a song by American rock band Beartooth. The song was released on March 25, 2021, as the second single from their fourth studio album Below. It peaked at number 14 on the Billboard Mainstream Rock Songs chart in September 2021.

== Background ==
The song was released on March 25, 2021, as the second single from their fourth studio album, Below, a week after the first single "Devastation". A music video was released the same day, featuring footage of the band performing the song among pyrotechnics and the band battling a surreal demon.

Frontman Caleb Shomo noted that "The Past Is Dead" was one of the earliest songs written for the Below album. The band worked on the song for over two years, eventually settling on the version that was included on the album, which ended up setting the tone for the rest of the album as well.

A vinyl press of the single was released in August 2021, featuring "Skin" as the track's B-side and is limited to 500 copies.

== Themes and composition ==
The song is noted for maintaining the high energy commonly present in their music, but emphasizing emotive and melodic vocals rather than aggressive screaming. It contains metalcore guitar riffs and breakdowns with extensive guitar layering and overdubbing. The song's sound was described as more "anthemic", creating a juxtaposition between an uplifting sound and dark lyrical matter. Lyrically, the song is about the inability to move on from traumatic situations in life, inspired by Shomo's own mental strain he experienced over the course of 2020. The song's music video is meant to be a visual representation of the mental strain written about in the song.

== Music video ==
The music video for "The Past Is Dead" premiered on March 26, 2021. The video was directed by Wyatt Clough.

== Track listing ==
Digital download
No.	Title	Length
1.	"The Past Is Dead"	3:35

7" Vinyl
No.	Title	Length
1.	"The Past Is Dead"	3:35
2.	"Skin"	3:19

== Personnel ==
- Caleb Shomo – vocals, all instruments

== Charts ==
Chart performance for "The Past Is Dead"
Chart (2021)	Peak position
Germany Alternative (Deutsche Alternative Charts)	1
US Rock & Alternative Airplay (Billboard)	39

== Release history ==
Release dates and formats for "The Past Is Dead"
Region	Date	Format	Label	Ref.
Various	March 25, 2021	Digital download; streaming	Red Bull	
United Kingdom	August 2021	Vinyl	Red Bull	
