= Attn (song) =

Single by Beartooth

from the album The Surface
- Released: September 20, 2024
- Genre: Hard rock; pop rock
- Length: 3:23
- Label: Red Bull
- Songwriter: Caleb Shomo
- Producer: Shomo

Beartooth singles chronology
"I Was Alive" (2023)	"Attn" (2024)

Music video
- "Attn" on YouTube

"Attn" (stylized as ATTN.) is a song by American rock band Beartooth. It was released on September 20, 2024, as the seventh and final single from the deluxe edition of their fifth studio album, The Surface.

== Background ==
Caleb Shomo described "Attn" as "the ultimate conclusion" to the album cycle of The Surface. In a statement, Shomo stated, "I think self-love has led to a deeper understanding of my value as a person, to myself and to others... Chasing that feeling and trusting it and finding a group of people that will empower you in that journey is what it's all about."

== Composition ==
"Attn" was written and produced by Caleb Shomo. The song is described as pop rock and lyrically speaks about self-empowerment and being positive-minded.

== Critical reception ==
"Attn" was met with positive reviews from music critics. Hesher Keenan of MetalSucks stated, "It's catchy, it's hooky, and I'm sure plenty of crusty metalheads are going to be mad... Still, it's a high-energy piece that goes places that most other artists in the genre wouldn't go." Blabbermouth.net remarked, "In classic Beartooth fashion, it's rife with hooks, supremely catchy verses, arena-filling, sing-along choruses, and monster breakdowns. The anthemic highs are reflective of Shomo's introspective journey to finding and loving his authentic self." Paul Brown of Wall of Sound complimented the track calling it "a throwback to 80s film soundtracks" and described it as "a melodic metal jam that continues with the mentality of self-preservation and self-love, full to the brim of encouraging messaging and Caleb's soothing vocal display."

== Music video ==
The music video for "Attn" premiered on September 20, 2024. The video shows Shomo in a subway station before taking an elevator back to the streets above, a metaphor for "his professional and personal path from ground zero to the top."

== Personnel ==
Credits for "Attn" adapted from album's liner notes.

- Caleb Shomo – vocals, all instruments, producer, engineer, mastering, mixing
- Oshie Bichar – additional producer
- James Musshorn – additional engineer

== Charts ==
Chart performance for "Attn"
Chart (2024)	Peak position
US Hot Hard Rock Songs (Billboard)	18

== Release history ==
Release history for "Attn"
Region	Date	Format	Label	Ref.
Various	September 20, 2024	Digital download	Red Bull	
