= Might Love Myself =

2023 song by Beartooth

Single by Beartooth

from the album The Surface
- Released: July 21, 2023
- Length: 3:39
- Label: Red Bull
- Songwriter: Caleb Shomo
- Producer: Shomo

Beartooth singles chronology
"Sunshine!" (2023)	"Might Love Myself" (2023)	"Doubt Me" (2023)

Music video
- "Might Love Myself" on YouTube

"Might Love Myself" is a song by American rock band Beartooth. It was released on July 21, 2023, as the third single from their fifth studio album, The Surface. The song peaked at number one on the US Mainstream Rock chart, becoming the band's first number-one hit on the chart.

== Background and release ==
According to frontman Caleb Shomo, The Surface tells the story of his decision to pursue "a healthier relationship" with himself rather than continue "down a path of self-destruction". He described "Might Love Myself" as being about the first moment he realized that something was "significantly shifting" in his life. Shomo described the song as being about self-love, which he viewed as a choice rather than an emotion. He had previously believed he would never experience self-love, describing self-deprecation and self-hatred as his biggest problems, and wrote the song while the changes were taking place. While writing "Might Love Myself", Shomo had been listening to music by Ariana Grande, describing her songs as "super-empowering". He recalled that after listening to one of her records while walking to get coffee, the song's lyrics and melody came to him when he returned to his studio. Discussing the song, he said he was trying to express what he was feeling "without being so cryptic", adding that earlier Beartooth material had been "pretty cryptic".

Releasing "Might Love Myself" was "terrifying" to him because it was happier than Beartooth's previous material. The song premiered on SiriusXM's Octane one day before its official release. It was released as the third single from The Surface, following "Riptide" and "Sunshine!".

== Composition and lyrics ==
Consequence described the song as having a strong pop influence, melodic vocals, and a screamed bridge. Riff Magazine said it has a "slick guitar riff" with a "tight groove". Distorted Sound magazine wrote that the song's production gives it a softer sound than the album's previous singles, while still featuring a heavy metal breakdown. Sputnikmusic wrote that "Might Love Myself" paired melodic hooks with soaring instrumentation.

Discussing the lyric "still hate who I became", Shomo said the feeling remained, but that he was trying to love every part of his life and see the positive in it.

== Reception ==
Metal Hammer described "Might Love Myself" as floating in a "cloud of effervescence". Sputnikmusic contrasted "Might Love Myself" with Beartooth's earlier, darker material, calling it a "feel-good anthem", while AllMusic called it a "fist-pumping anthem". Blabbermouth.net described the song as having an "anthemic" late-1990s rock quality and as offering something new from Beartooth. Upset characterized the song as "sun-soaked" radio rock.

== Track listing ==
All tracks are written and produced by Caleb Shomo, with Oshie Bichar as additional producer.

"Might Love Myself" single
No.	Title	Length
1.	"Might Love Myself"	3:39
2.	"Sunshine!"	3:18
3.	"Riptide"	3:31
Total length:		10:29

== Chart performance ==
"Might Love Myself" became Beartooth's first song to reach No. 1 on the Billboard Mainstream Rock Airplay chart, topping the chart dated November 18, 2023. It was the band's 11th entry on the chart.

== Personnel ==
Credits adapted from Apple Music.

Beartooth

- Caleb Shomo – vocals
- Zach Huston – lead guitar
- Will Deely – rhythm guitar
- Oshie Bichar – bass
- Connor Denis – drums

Production

- Caleb Shomo – songwriting, production, mixing, mastering
- Oshie Bichar – additional production
- James Musshorn – additional engineering

== Charts ==
Weekly chart performance for "Might Love Myself"
Chart (2023)	Peak position
US Rock & Alternative Airplay (Billboard)	11
US Mainstream Rock Airplay (Billboard)	1
