= Pure Ecstasy =

Studio album by Beartooth
- Released: August 28, 2026
- Length: 38:23
- Label: Fearless
- Producers: Caleb Shomo; Jordan Fish

Beartooth chronology
The Surface (2023)	Pure Ecstasy (2026)

Singles from Pure Ecstasy
- 1. "Free" Released: February 27, 2026; 2. "Pure Ecstasy" Released: May 15, 2026; 3. "Bullshit" Released: June 19, 2026; 4. "Eyes Closed" Released: July 24, 2026; 5. "Beautiful Again" Released: August 28, 2026

Pure Ecstasy is the sixth studio album by the American rock band Beartooth. The album was released on August 28, 2026, through Fearless Records.

== Singles and promotion ==
On February 27, 2026, the band released the first single "Free" and an accompanying music video, whilst supporting Bad Omens on tour with President. On May 15, Beartooth unveiled the second single and title track of the album, along with an announcement of the album and track listing.

On June 19, the band released the third single "Bullshit" and a corresponding lyric video. On July 24, the band released the fourth single "Eyes Closed" along with a music video. Finally, a music video for "Beautiful Again" was released to coincide with the album release date.

In addition, as of August 2026 the band is due to begin a headlining world tour in September to promote the album; they will joined by Silverstein and Kingdom of Giants across Europe, Don Broco, Magnolia Park, and Windwaker across the U.S., and Fit for a King and Volumes across Australia.

== Influences and background ==
When the music video for "Free" was released, some fans criticized frontman Caleb Shomo's appearance in the video, leading to public backlash, causing Shomo to temporarily deactivate his Instagram account.

On May 23, 2026, days after the band released the single "Pure Ecstasy", Caleb Shomo reopened his Instagram account and put out a statement announcing that he was gay. Shomo also stated that "his upcoming music will reflect what he is experiencing in this new chapter of his life".

== Critical reception ==
Professional ratings
Review scores
Source	Rating
AllMusic	4.5/5 stars
Kerrang!	4/5
Metal Hammer	4/5 stars
PopMatters	7/10
Spill Magazine	8/10

Pure Ecstasy received generally positive reviews from critics. James Hickie of Kerrang! cited that the album "can't fail to find an audience, even if it's not to the tastes of some of Beartooth's diehard fans", telling people to not "expect the same level of musical intensity", yet "there are still moments"; overall, he scored the album a 4/5, saying it hasn't been "pored over in the same way as its predecessors", but "it's as full of passion and pain as what's come before", being "the subject of the kind of evolution that comes with time".

== Track listing ==
All music is composed by Caleb Shomo and Jordan Fish, except where noted.

Pure Ecstasy track listing
No.	Title	Music	Length
1.	"Pure Ecstasy"	Shomo, Fish, Misha Mansoor	3:05
2.	"Eyes Closed"		3:26
3.	"Bullshit"		3:35
4.	"Beautiful Again"		3:30
5.	"Stadiums"	Shomo, Fish, Skyler Acord	3:50
6.	"Free"		3:08
7.	"Sorry"	Shomo, Fish, Acord	3:49
8.	"Lose You to Find Me"		3:27
9.	"You"		3:33
10.	"For Me by Me"	Shomo, Acord	3:07
11.	"I Made It"		3:53
Total length:			38:23

== Personnel ==
Credits are adapted from Tidal.

=== Beartooth ===
- Caleb Shomo – lead vocals
- Zach Huston – lead guitar
- Will Deely – rhythm guitar
- Oshie Bichar – bass, backing vocals
- Connor Denis – drums

=== Additional musician ===
- Misha Mansoor – rhythm guitar (1)

=== Production ===
- Jordan Fish – production
- Caleb Shomo – production, mastering, mixing, engineering
- Jake Rene – engineering
- Oshie Bichar – additional production
- Misha Mansoor – additional production (1)
- Skyler Acord – additional production (5, 10)
- Matt Sirtori – additional engineering (all except 6)
- Stephen Wegman – additional engineering (all except 6)

== Charts ==
Chart performance for Pure Ecstasy
Chart (2026)	Peak position
Australian Albums (ARIA)	21
Austrian Albums (Ö3 Austria)	40
French Rock & Metal Albums (SNEP)	60
German Albums (Offizielle Top 100)	39
German Rock & Metal Albums (Offizielle Top 100)	16
UK Album Downloads (Official Charts)	32
UK Rock & Metal Albums (Official Charts)	12
US Billboard 200	114
US Independent Albums (Billboard)	15
US Top Hard Rock Albums (Billboard)	9
US Top Rock & Alternative Albums (Billboard)	32
