= Sick (EP) =

EP by Beartooth
- Released: July 26, 2013
- Genre: Metalcore; hardcore punk
- Length: 15:26
- Label: Red Bull
- Producer: Caleb Shomo

Beartooth chronology
Sick (2013)	Disgusting (2014)

Singles from Sick
- 1. "I Have a Problem" Released: December 18, 2012; 2. "Set Me On Fire" Released: December 24, 2012; 3. "Pick Your Poison" Released: January 24, 2013

Sick is the debut EP by American rock band Beartooth. It was released on July 26, 2013, through Red Bull Records for free download and is produced by Caleb Shomo formerly of the band Attack Attack! who sang and recorded all the instruments used on the album.

== Background ==
Caleb Shomo began writing Beartooth songs while he was still in Attack Attack! as "a different musical outlet" as a way to make fun, punk-rock, hardcore, wild music, play crazy shows and have a good time without pressure from anything. The first release from this album was the song 'I Have a Problem', released on February 6, 2013 along with a live music video. The band was officially announced to be part of the roster for 'Red Bull Records' later that year in June. Later that month, the band released their EP via email subscription, and later toured with City Lights across the US throughout August to promote the EP.

== Promotion ==
The band released a total of four music videos in promotion of the EP. Before the album's announcement, they released a live music video for 'I Have a Problem. They later released the other three videos for 'I Have a Problem' (not to be confused with their earlier live version), 'Pick Your Poison' and 'Go Be the Voice'. The song 'Go Be the Voice' was featured on Altpress article '11 New Songs You Need To Hear Right Now: November 2013 Edition' in promotion of the song, EP and then recent video.

== Critical reception ==
Professional ratings
Review scores
Source	Rating
HM	4/5 stars

HM Magazine reviewer Sarah Roberts stated that the EP was a powerful release. She praised the sound of the guitars during their use in heavy rhythms and the clarity of the vocals despite the dominance of the guitars. She recommended the album for those interested in hardcore punk music.

== Track listing ==
No.	Title	Length
1.	"I Have a Problem^{[I]}"	3:59
2.	"Go Be the Voice"	4:03
3.	"Pick Your Poison"	3:48
4.	"Set Me on Fire"	3:30
Total length:		15:26

I "I Have a Problem" was later re-recorded for Beartooth's debut album Disgusting.

== Personnel ==
Beartooth

- Caleb Shomo – vocals, all instruments

Production

- Produced, mixed & mastered by Caleb Shomo
- A&R - Kenny "Tick" Salcido
- A&R John Feldmann

== Release history ==
Region	Date	Label	Format	Catalog
Worldwide	July 26, 2013	Red Bull Records	Digital	RBR 1235
Worldwide	July 26, 2013	Red Bull Records	CD-ROM	Unknown
