= Disease (Beartooth album) =

Studio album by Beartooth
- Released: September 28, 2018
- Genres: Hardcore punk; metalcore; pop-punk; melodic hardcore
- Length: 41:00
- Labels: Red Bull; UNFD
- Producers: Caleb Shomo; Nick Raskulinecz; Oshie Bichar; Kamron Bradbury; Zakk Cervini

Beartooth chronology
Aggressive (2016)	Disease (2018)	Below (2021)

Singles from Disease
- 1. "Disease" Released: July 23, 2018; 2. "Bad Listener" Released: July 23, 2018; 3. "Manipulation" Released: September 7, 2018; 4. "You Never Know" Released: January 18, 2019; 5. "Afterall" Released: June 3, 2019

Disease is the third studio album by American rock band Beartooth. It was released on September 28, 2018, through Red Bull Records and UNFD. The album was announced on July 18, 2018, following the leak of one of the songs ("Infection") that is featured on the album. The band then released two (official) singles on July 23: "Disease" and "Bad Listener". On September 7, their third single, "Manipulation", was released. On January 18, 2019, "You Never Know" was released as their fourth single along with its music video.

== Background ==
=== Production ===
Caleb Shomo is the lead vocalist, guitarist, bassist, drummer and the lyricist. According to Shomo, the process for developing this album was difficult compared to the others as Shomo explored outside the confines of his basement. Shomo says "I wanted to get a different vibe on this record," meaning he chose to go to studios around the world. His regular strategy for a song he was working on was to write them in his basement and play them on programmed instruments to get a feel for how it would sound and play it on actual instruments later: working on "Disease" being actual studio gave him the opportunity to play on the instruments immediately and get the sounds he wanted faster.

== Composition ==
=== Themes ===
Shomo wanted to address the futility in his life and not hide it, he wanted to produce songs that feel real: with his previous album, Aggressive, he felt he was faking being happy and that nothing was wrong. With Disease, he didn't want to lie anymore and instead dive back into his emotions and express it through the music to produce a track that felt honest and relatable. Shomo, during the 2018 tour promoting Disease, would give a small speech before every show expressing the need to be aware of depression, and, if you feel depressed, to talk to someone. Each speech varied in content; all of them were inspired by a great friend of his, Kyle Pavone from We Came as Romans, who died from overdosing. Shomo, a year and half before a speech he gave on October 1, 2018, while contemplating suicide, developed the idea that depression is a disease.

== Track listing ==
No.	Title	Writer(s)	Length
1.	"Greatness or Death"	Caleb Shomo; Oshie Bichar	3:22
2.	"Disease"	Shomo; Felipe Magrini	3:48
3.	"Fire"	Shomo; Bichar	3:26
4.	"You Never Know"	Shomo; Drew Fulk	3:03
5.	"Bad Listener"	Shomo; Bichar	3:28
6.	"Afterall"	Shomo; Joe Cotela; Joel Madden; Zakk Cervini	3:20
7.	"Manipulation"	Shomo; Bichar; Paul Marc Rousseau	3:22
8.	"Enemy"	Shomo	3:20
9.	"Believe"	Shomo; Fulk	3:15
10.	"Infection"	Shomo; Cervini	3:23
11.	"Used and Abused"	Shomo; Nick Raskulinecz	3:31
12.	"Clever"	Shomo	3:41
Total length:			41:00

B-sides
No.	Title	Writer(s)	Length
1.	"Takeover"	Shomo; Bichar	2:58
2.	"Messed Up"	Shomo	3:05
Total length:			6:03

The Blackbird Session
No.	Title	Writer(s)	Length
1.	"Afterall" (The Blackbird Session)	Shomo; Cotela; Madden; Cervini	3:58
2.	"You Never Know" (The Blackbird Session)	Shomo; Fulk	3:58
3.	"Disease" (The Blackbird Session)	Shomo	3:35
4.	"Clever" (The Blackbird Session)	Shomo	5:14
Total length:			16:45

Deluxe edition
No.	Title	Writer(s)	Length
13.	"Messed Up"	Shomo	3:05
14.	"Takeover"	Shomo; Bichar	2:58
15.	"Young"	Shomo	1:55
16.	"Threat to Society"	Shomo; Bichar	3:57
17.	"You Never Know (Live from Rock am Ring)"	Shomo; Fulk	3:53
18.	"Bad Listener (Live from Rock am Ring)"	Shomo; Bichar	4:05
Total length:			60:53

== Personnel ==
Beartooth

- Caleb Shomo – vocals
- Zach Huston – lead guitar
- Kamron Bradbury – rhythm guitar
- Oshie Bichar – bass
- Connor Denis – drums

Additional contributors

- Caleb Shomo – production, mixing
- Kamron Bradbury – additional production
- Nathan Yarborough – Engineer
- Oshie Bichar – additional production
- Nick Raskulinecz – production, executive production
- Zakk Cervini – production (6, 10)
- Ted Jensen – mastering
- Peter Geiser – engineering
- Nicole Valentina Angel – art draw
- Nick Fancher – photography
- Kenny "Tick" Salcido – A&R

== Charts ==
Chart (2018)	Peak position
Australian Albums (ARIA)	66
Austrian Albums (Ö3 Austria)	33
Canadian Albums (Billboard)	83
German Albums (Offizielle Top 100)	49
Scottish Albums (Official Charts)	41
Swiss Albums (Schweizer Hitparade)	67
UK Albums (Official Charts)	55
UK Rock & Metal Albums (OCC)	3
US Billboard 200	40
US Independent Albums (Billboard)	1
US Top Hard Rock Albums (Billboard)	1
US Top Rock Albums (Billboard)	5
