= Beartooth (band) =

American rock band

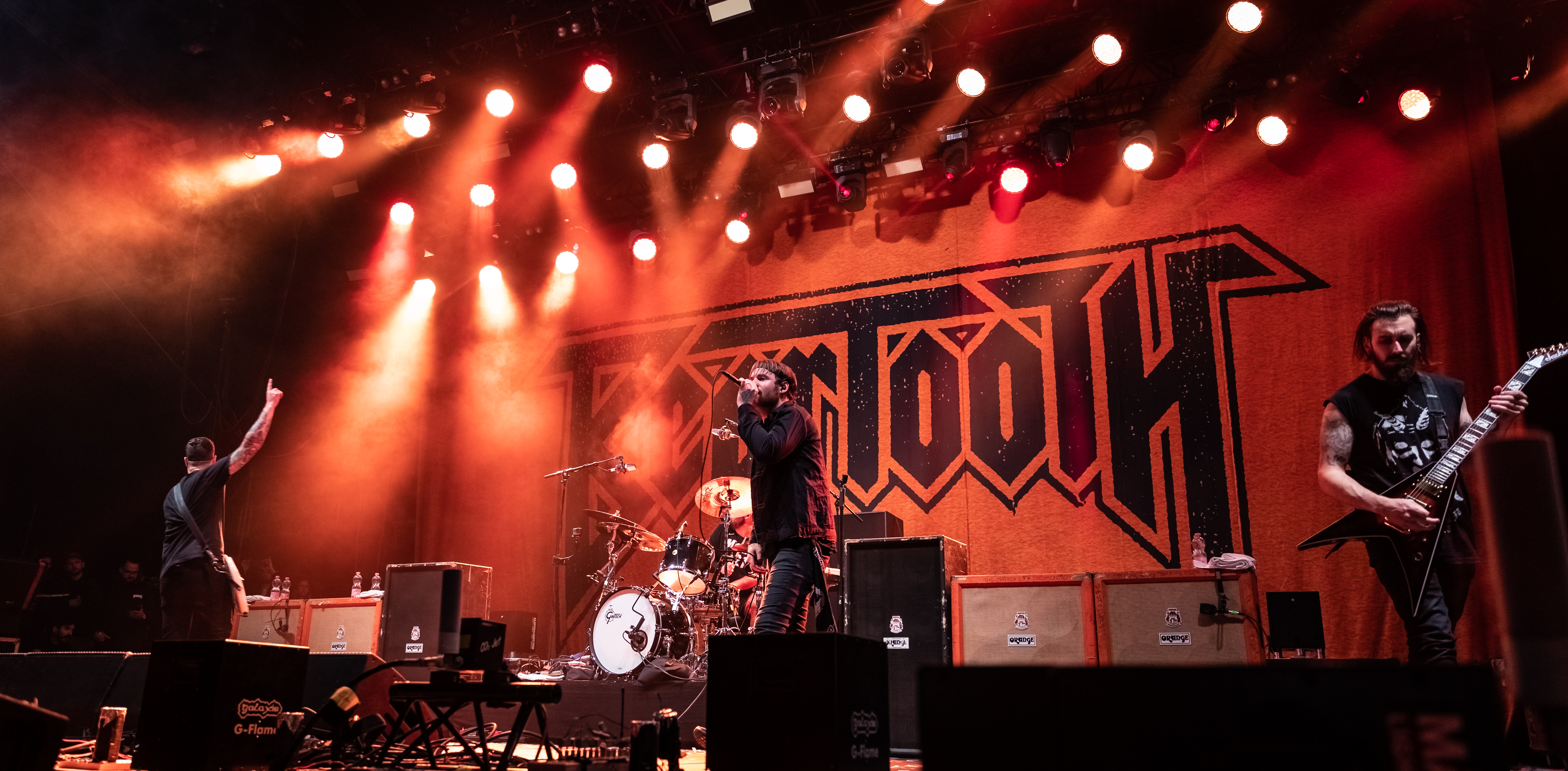
- Beartooth performing at Rock am Ring in 2019.

Background information
- Also known as: Noise (2012)
- Origin: Columbus, Ohio, U.S.
- Genres: Metalcore; alternative metal; hard rock; melodic hardcore; post-hardcore
- Works: Beartooth discography
- Years active: 2012–present
- Labels: Red Bull; UNFD; Fearless
- Spinoff of: Attack Attack!; My Ticket Home
- Members: Caleb Shomo; Oshie Bichar; Connor Denis; Zach Huston; Will Deely
- Past members: Nick Reed; Brandon Mullins; Taylor Lumley; Kamron Bradbury
- Website: beartoothband.com

Beartooth is an American rock band founded by vocalist and multi-instrumentalist Caleb Shomo in Columbus, Ohio, in 2012. Originally, Beartooth was a studio project with Shomo performing all instruments, before expanding to a group with four or five members over their existence. They are known for relatively more conventional songwriting than some of Shomo's other work, with an emphasis on melodic hooks and catchy choruses. Beartooth has been signed to Red Bull Records since 2013; their debut EP Sick was released on July 26, 2013, followed by the debut full-length album Disgusting on June 10, 2014. Since then, Shomo has released a further five studio albums under the Beartooth moniker: Aggressive (2016), Disease (2018), Below (2021), The Surface (2023), and Pure Ecstasy (2026).

== History ==
=== Formation and Sick (2012–2014) ===
Beartooth's official logo since their formation

Caleb Shomo began writing Beartooth songs while still a member of metalcore band Attack Attack!, to which he contributed keyboards, guitar and unclean vocals. The band's earliest lineup consisted of Shomo with members of My Ticket Home and the live crew for Attack Attack!. The band was named after a location called Beartooth Court, where their original bassist grew up. This version of the band did not last long, and instead Shomo began writing solo under the name Noise. He switched the name back to Beartooth upon realizing that the name was already taken. Shomo has stated Beartooth was "supposed to be a mere distraction" while he was still a member of Attack Attack! and nothing beyond that, having no intentions to record or play live music; however, after his departure from Attack Attack!, he then focused on the project full-time – a move that would see Beartooth "surpass [Shomo's] wildest expectations." After making the decision to make Beartooth a live act, Shomo recruited bassist Nick Reed, guitarist Taylor Lumley, and drummer Brandon Mullins, who had all been live crew for Attack Attack!.

Shomo has said that "Set Me on Fire" was the first Beartooth song ever written, followed by "I Have a Problem." These songs, as well as "Go Be the Voice" and "Pick Your Poison," were released online in December 2012. After uploading a live music video for "I Have a Problem," Beartooth announced a string of one-off dates that brought them right into fans living rooms, mostly in the Midwest, following the buzz surrounding the band's live performance in the "I Have a Problem" live video. It played a date on the 2013 Vans Warped Tour and was featured on the entire 2015 tour.

On June 7, 2013, Shomo announced Beartooth was now signed to Red Bull Records. They released their debut EP Sick for free on their website on July 26, 2013, with Shomo singing, producing and playing all instruments on the record. On August 17, 2013, the band released a video for "I Have a Problem," not to be confused with the earlier live version. On December 18, 2013, the band was confirmed for the Warped Tour 2014. On November 14, the band released a music video for the song "Go Be the Voice."

=== Disgusting and lineup changes (2014–2015) ===
On January 6, 2014, Kamron Bradbury, formerly of City Lights was announced as the new rhythm guitarist. In early 2014, Reed left Beartooth and was replaced with Oshie Bichar of City Lights for a U.S. tour with Memphis May Fire throughout February and March.

On April 29, 2014, Beartooth released a live music video for their new song, "Dead," set to appear on their forthcoming album, Disgusting. On May 13, 2014, they was announced through Facebook the release date for the debut full-length album, Disgusting, as June 10, 2014, along with its track listing. The first single for the album was released on the same day, titled "Beaten In Lips," along with its music video. The album was available to stream online a day before its release. As with Beartooth's debut EP, Shomo sang, produced, and played all instruments on Disgusting, except for "In Between," co-produced by John Feldmann.

Beartooth participated in the Warped Tour 2014 throughout July to early August in order to promote the album. In Europe, they embarked on their first headlining tour while it was also announced that they would tour as support to Pierce the Veil and Sleeping With Sirens. In August it was announced that they would also be headlining in their first ever North America tour throughout October with support acts Vanna, Sirens & Sailors, Sylar and Alive Like Me. In February 2015, they toured the United Kingdom in support of Don Broco, We Are the In Crowd, and Bury Tomorrow as part of that year's Kerrang! Tour. In March, Beartooth toured across America in a series of 'DIY venues' and house shows some of which were secret, with support act Ghost Key, stating that it is a means of giving back to their fans and that they love performing in a house, much like how the band first toured. In May, the band's single "I Have a Problem" was a confirmed track for the then-upcoming game Guitar Hero Live. From May and early June, they toured the UK with support from The Color Morale and Dead Harts, also performing at the Slam Dunk and Download festivals.

=== Aggressive and lineup changes (2015–2018) ===
In August 2015, Shomo announced, via Instagram, that the band was working on new material, but no release date was mentioned. In August, the band performed at Reading and Leeds, later supporting Slipknot along with Suicidal Tendencies in North America and Canada in October, and toured as a headline act in the UK in November. On April Fools' Day the band released a "swingcore jazz" version of its song "Dead" as a prank to fans stating that it was brand new material, however it did state that the album's recording had finished in March and would be released later that year. On April 4, 2016, the band announced that they had parted ways with drummer Brandon Mullins on good terms and wished the best for him, and also assured fans that this would not interfere with upcoming tours, with former Being as an Ocean's drummer Connor Dennis stepping-in in a touring capacity. The band then toured as headline act from early March to mid-May with a variety of support acts: Silent Planet, Ghost Key, Stray from the Path, My Ticket Home, and Former on mixed dates and had been announced as one of the performers of Download Festival 2016.

On April 16, 2016, it was leaked that Beartooth would release Aggressive on June 3. The band later confirmed the album title and premiered its title track on Sirius XM's Octane channel that day.

=== Disease (2018–2019) ===
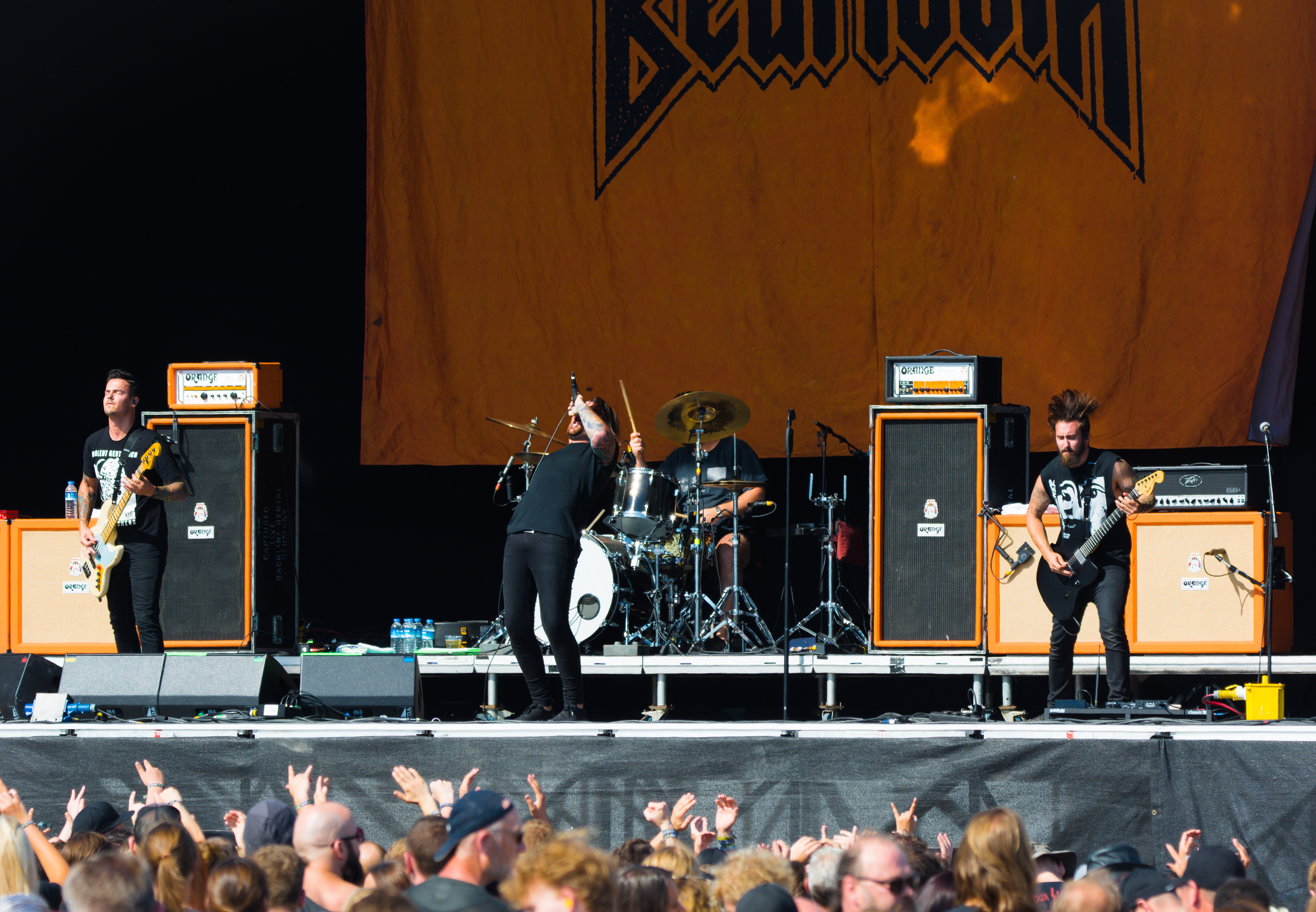
Beartooth performing at Elbriot in 2018

In April 2018, guitarist Taylor Lumley departed the band to pursue other avenues; his replacement was announced in June 2018 with ex-Like Moths to Flames guitarist Zach Huston joining Beartooth full time. It was also announced drummer Connor Denis had joined the band full-time. On July 18, the songs "Infection," "Disease," and "Believe" leaked online, forcing the band to reveal the name of its new album, Disease, the tracklisting, and its artwork. On July 23, the album's first single, "Disease," was released. "Bad Listener" was also released the same day. "Manipulation" was released as the album's third single on September 7. "You Never Know" became the album's fourth single on January 18, 2019. "Afterall" became the album's fifth and final single on June 3, 2019. On September 28, Beartooth released their third studio album, Disease.

On May 10, 2019, Beartooth released the EP B-Sides, consisting of two unused songs from the album Disease.

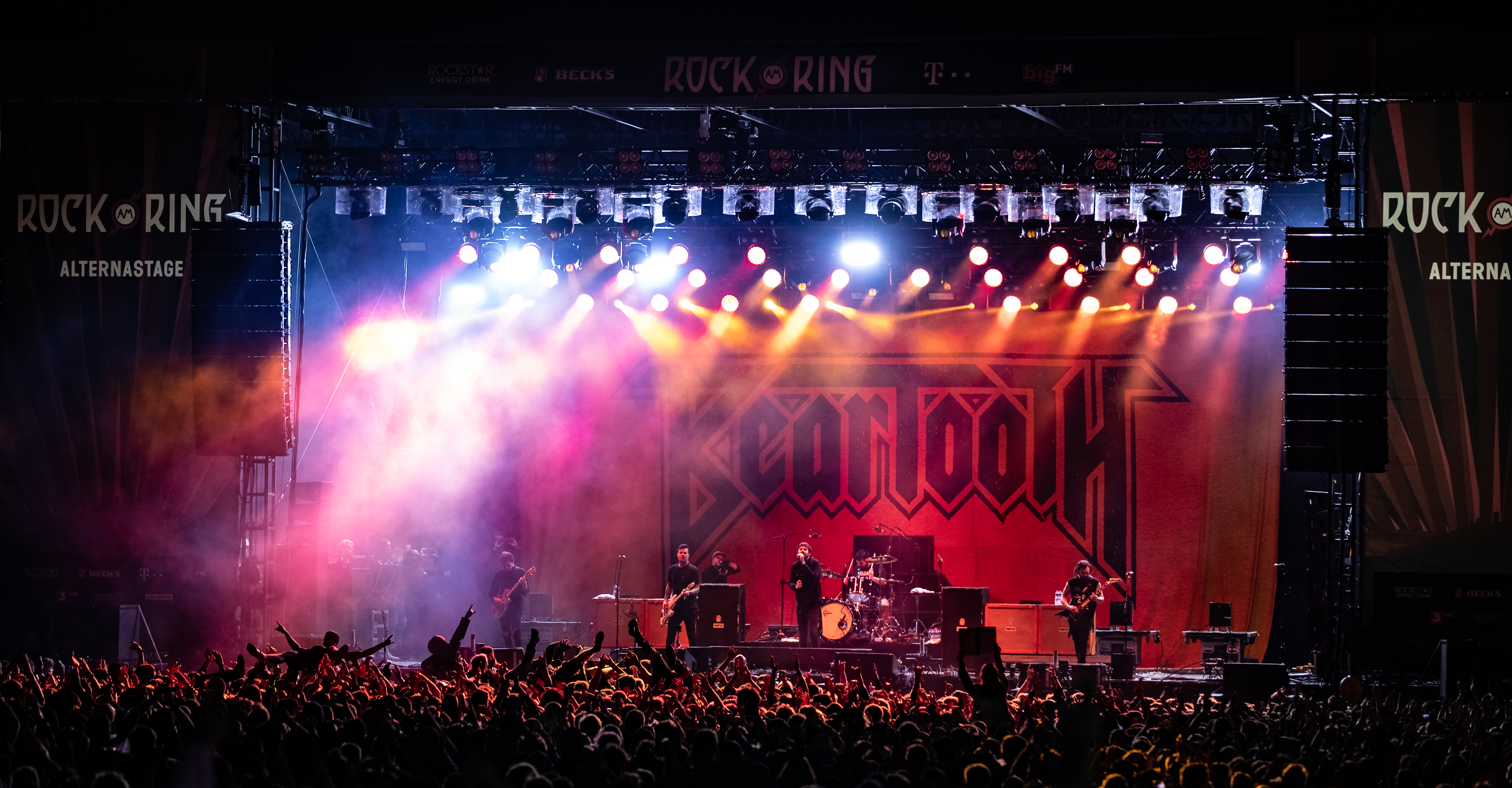
Beartooth at Rock am Ring 2019

On October 25, 2019, the band released a deluxe edition of Disease which featured the two songs from their B-Sides EP, two new tracks titled "Young" and "Threat to Society," as well as two live performances from their Rock am Ring set.

=== Lineup changes and Below (2020–2021) ===
On May 24, 2020, Beartooth announced that longtime guitarist Kamron Bradbury was leaving the band for personal reasons. On June 23, Shomo said that the band's fourth album, which he referred to as "LP4," was being recorded at Capital House Studio in Ohio. On December 8, Shomo stated on a Twitch stream that he was "aiming for an album release by spring 2021" and that singles would "definitely" be released before then. On December 18, the band released a remixed/remastered version of the band's second studio album Aggressive with added vocal layers and instrumentation.

On March 19, 2021, the band surprise-released a new song called "Devastation." A week later the band released "The Past Is Dead" and revealed the title of fourth album to be Below. It was also announced that the album would be released on June 25, and that guitar tech Will Deely had become the band's new guitarist. On April 23, "Hell of It" was released as the album's third single. On May 21, one month before the album release, the band released the fourth single "Fed Up," which Shomo revealed "was written mid lockdown" in 2020 during and about the COVID-19 lockdowns. The album's fifth and final single, "Skin," was released on the same day as the album. On March 18, 2022, the band released a deluxe edition of Below which featured two new songs titled "Fighting Back" and "Permanently Sealed" as well as an alternative version of the song "Skin" and several live tracks.

=== The Surface (2022–2025) ===
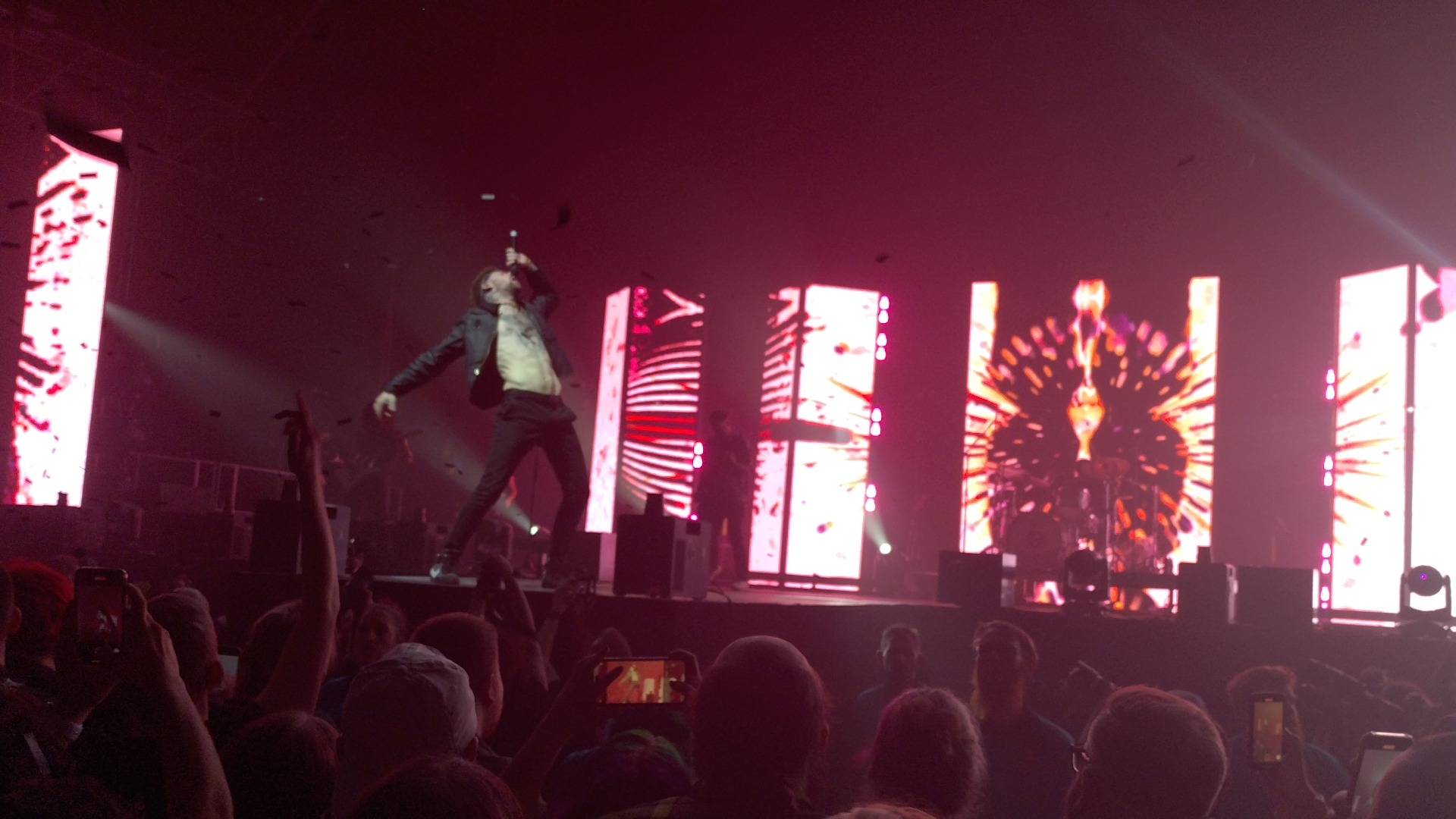
Beartooth performing at Alexandra Palace in London in October 2024

On July 12, 2022, the band released "Riptide," the first single for their next album, and an accompanying music video. On April 21, 2023, Beartooth unveiled the second single titled "Sunshine!" On July 21, the band released the third single "Might Love Myself," and its corresponding music video. That same day, they announced that their fifth studio album The Surface would be released on October 13, 2023. They also revealed the album cover and track list.

On August 25, the band released the fourth single "Doubt Me" along with a music video. On September 15, one month before the album release, the band released the fifth single "The Better Me" featuring Hardy. The music video for "I Was Alive" was released October 13, 2023, coinciding with the album release. On September 20, 2024, the band released a deluxe edition of The Surface which featured a new song titled "Attn" along with its music video. The deluxe edition also featured a few live and remix tracks from the album.

=== Pure Ecstasy (2026–present) ===
On February 27, 2026, the band released the single, "Free," their first release with Fearless Records. On May 15, 2026, the band released the single, "Pure Ecstasy," along with announcing the title of their upcoming record and its tracklisting and release details. On June 19, 2026, the album's third single, "Bullshit", was released. The new album, Pure Ecstasy, was released on August 28, 2026.

== Musical style and influences ==
Beartooth's style has been described as metalcore, alternative metal, hard rock, melodic hardcore, hardcore punk, melodic metalcore, post-hardcore, and pop-punk. Beartooth's style on both their EP Sick and album Disgusting has been described as metalcore, but with more prominent punk rock influences than the style of Caleb Shomo's previous band Attack Attack! and without the electronic elements that Attack Attack! employed. Reviewers have also highlighted Shomo's emphasis on catchy choruses. Chad Childers of Loudwire commented that "the former Attack Attack! rocker [Shomo]... is delivering a mix of metalcore and old-school punk on his new band's Disgusting album," while Rock Sound described Beartooth as "mix[ing] metalcore with nu metal and... massive choruses." Kory Grow of Rolling Stone wrote that compared to Attack Attack!, the "smarter, leaner Beartooth have anteed up the aggression with poppy hooks and slinky hardcore riffing," and Justin Mabee of HM Magazine said the following of Disgusting: "while much of the album tends to focus on two-steps, thrash and hardcore, Shomo came from a place where catchiness was in every song." Shomo was also named one of Alternative Press' "15 best screamers in modern metalcore" in February 2014. Another source called the band nu metal revival. MetalSucks writer Finn McKenty called Beartooth's early work "hard to label" due to their verses often being "dirty, nasty punky-hardcore," while comparing their choruses to Demi Lovato.

Shomo himself commented on his intentions with Beartooth's style in an interview with Alternative Press in January 2013, when Sick had not been released yet, saying, "We just want to make fun, punk-rock, hardcore, wild music, play crazy shows and have a good time without any pressure from anything." When asked about the absence of electronic elements, which he has often worked with, from his new music, he stated, "I don't want any electronics in Beartooth. It is very hardcore and punk roots sounding. I have my electronic thing and I have this more hardcore thing, and I don't want those things to bleed into each other musically." In an interview with Kerrang! Shomo stated that he does not intend to change the band's sound on its second album, and that it will be dark and intense like its debut.

The band has cited influences including Ariana Grande, AC/DC, Comeback Kid, Billy Talent, Motörhead, Every Time I Die, Underoath, Slipknot, Ice Cube, New Found Glory, Blink-182, James Hetfield of Metallica, Britney Spears, NSYNC, One Direction, Led Zeppelin, Nirvana, Foo Fighters and Disturbed.

== Band members ==
Beartooth live at Full Force 2019

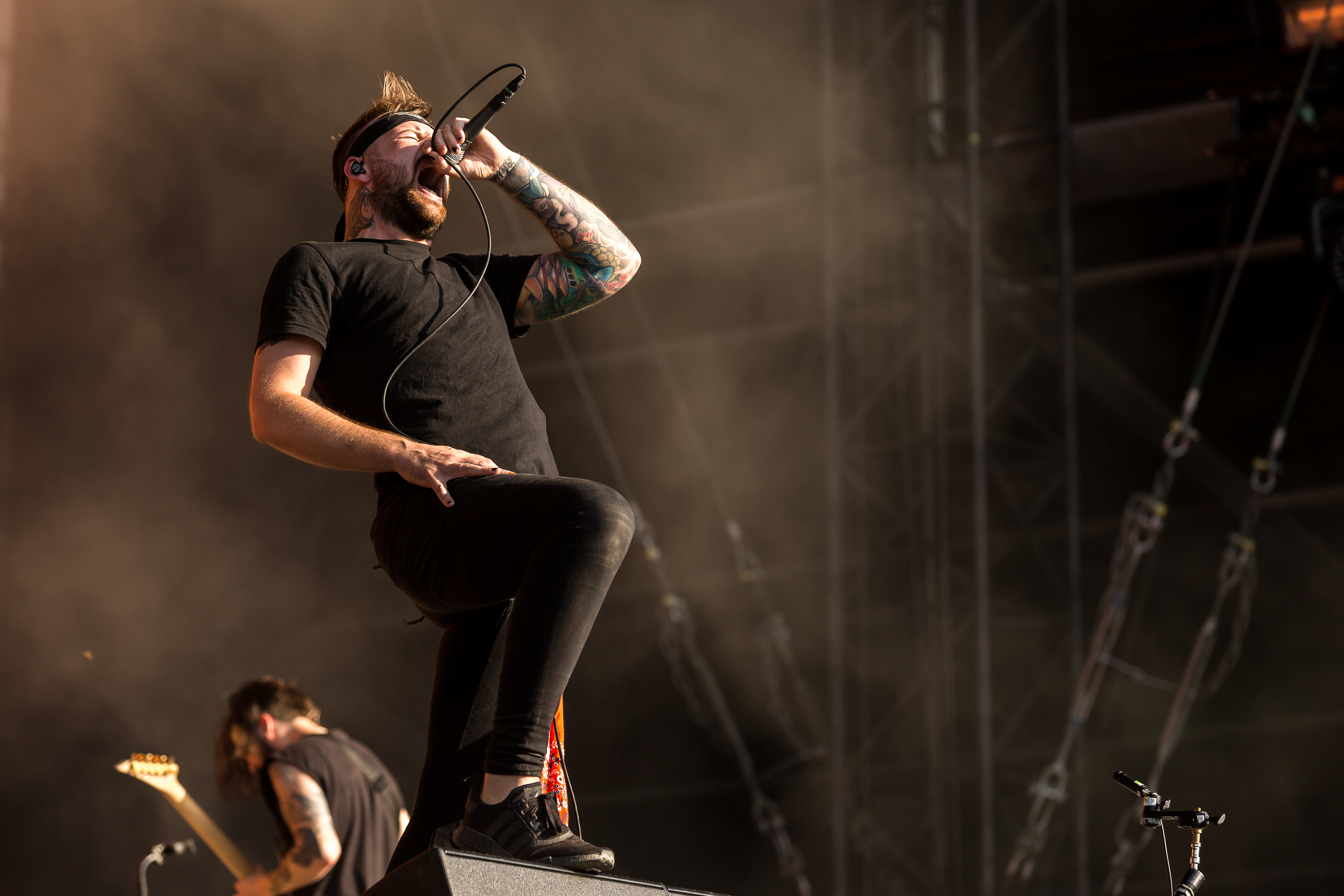
Lead vocalist Caleb Shomo

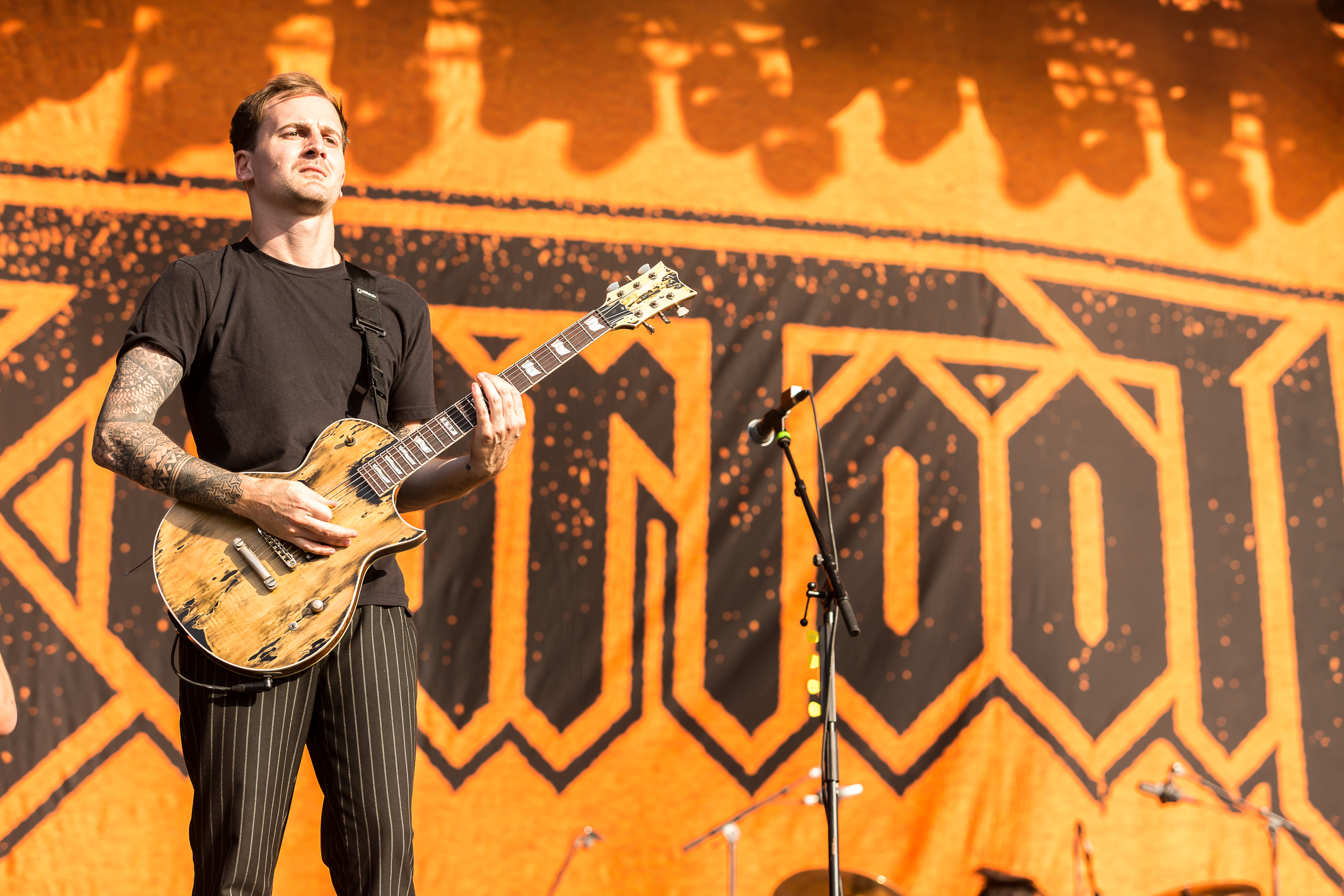
Former rhythm guitarist Kamron Bradbury

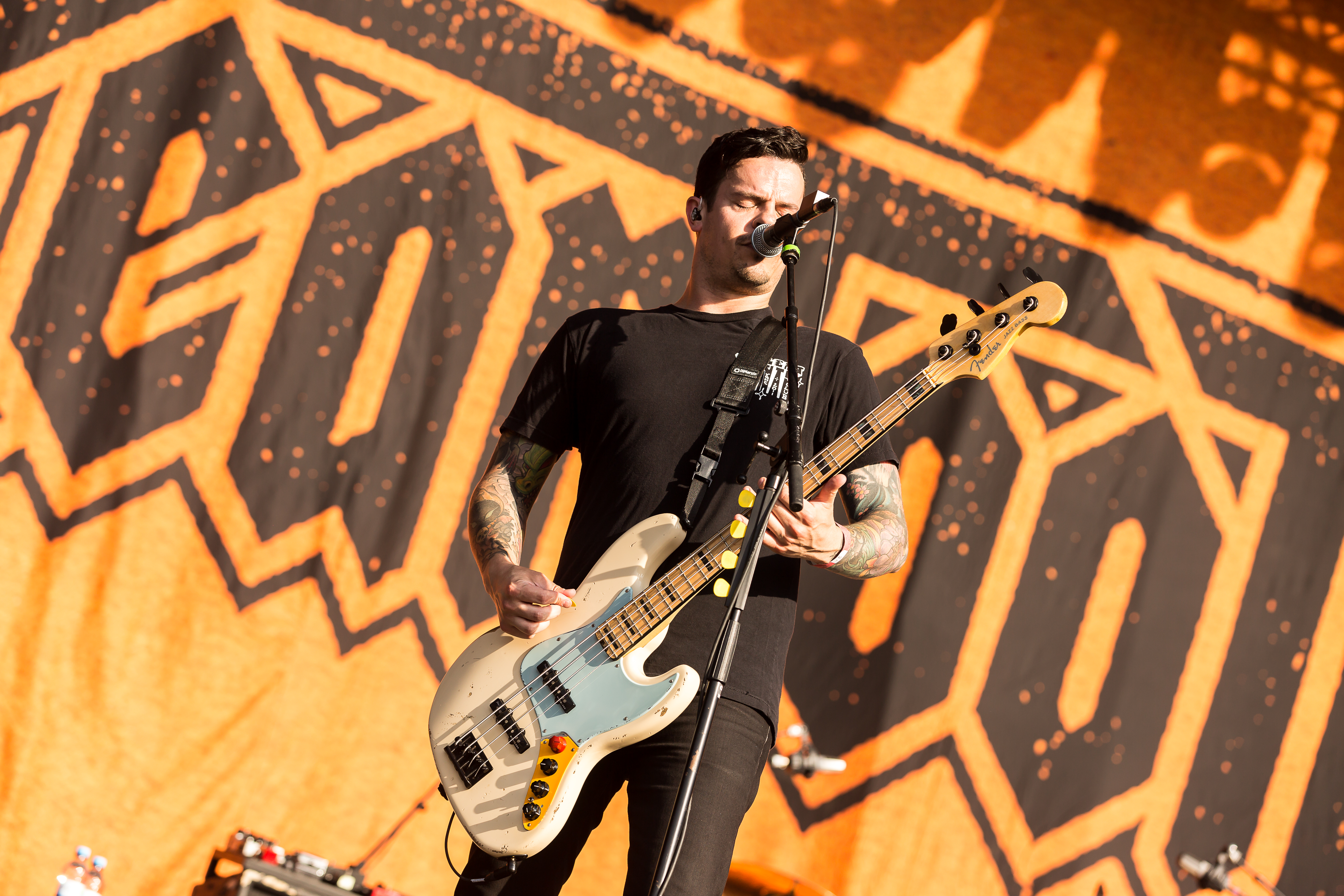
Bassist Oshie Bichar

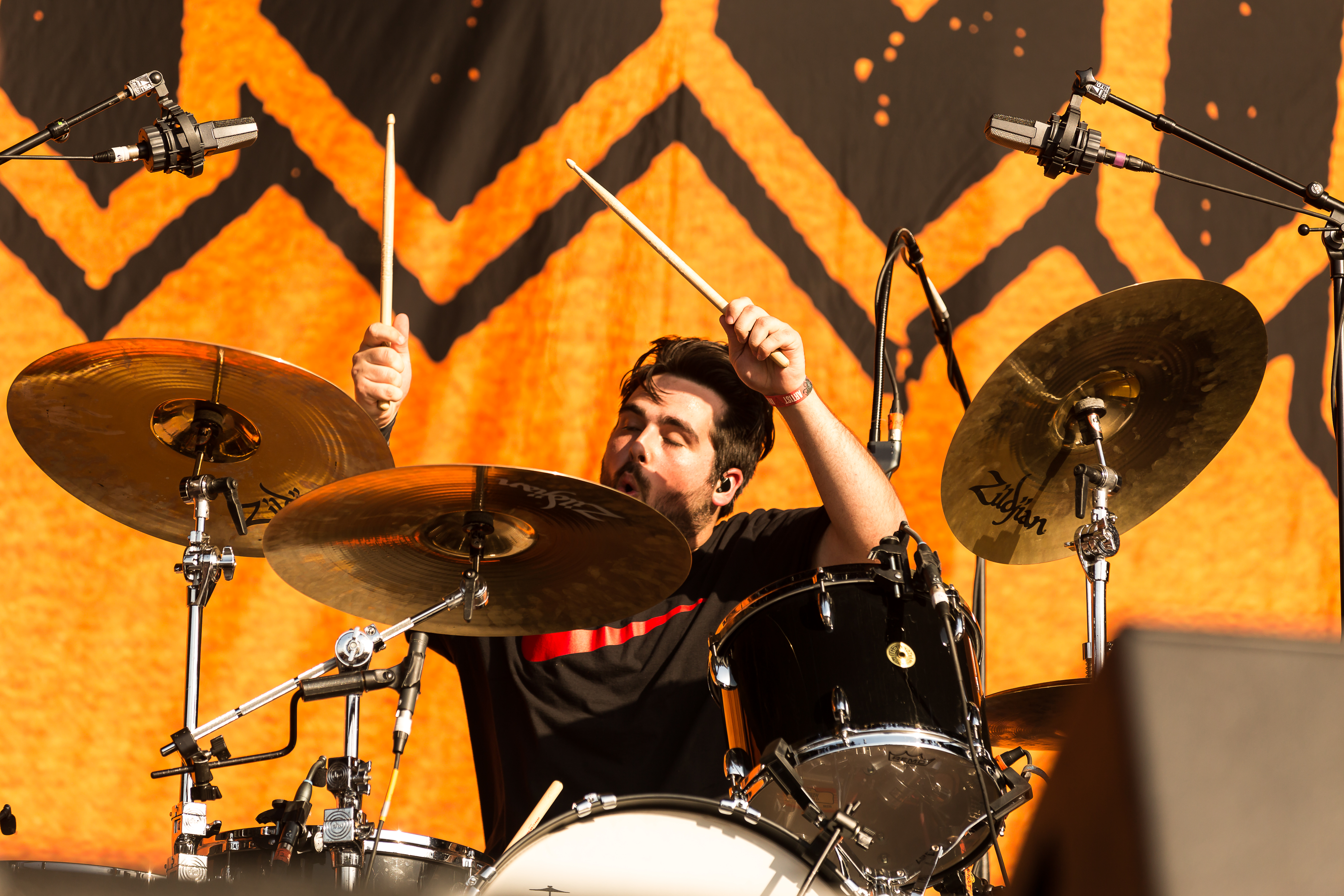
Drummer Connor Denis

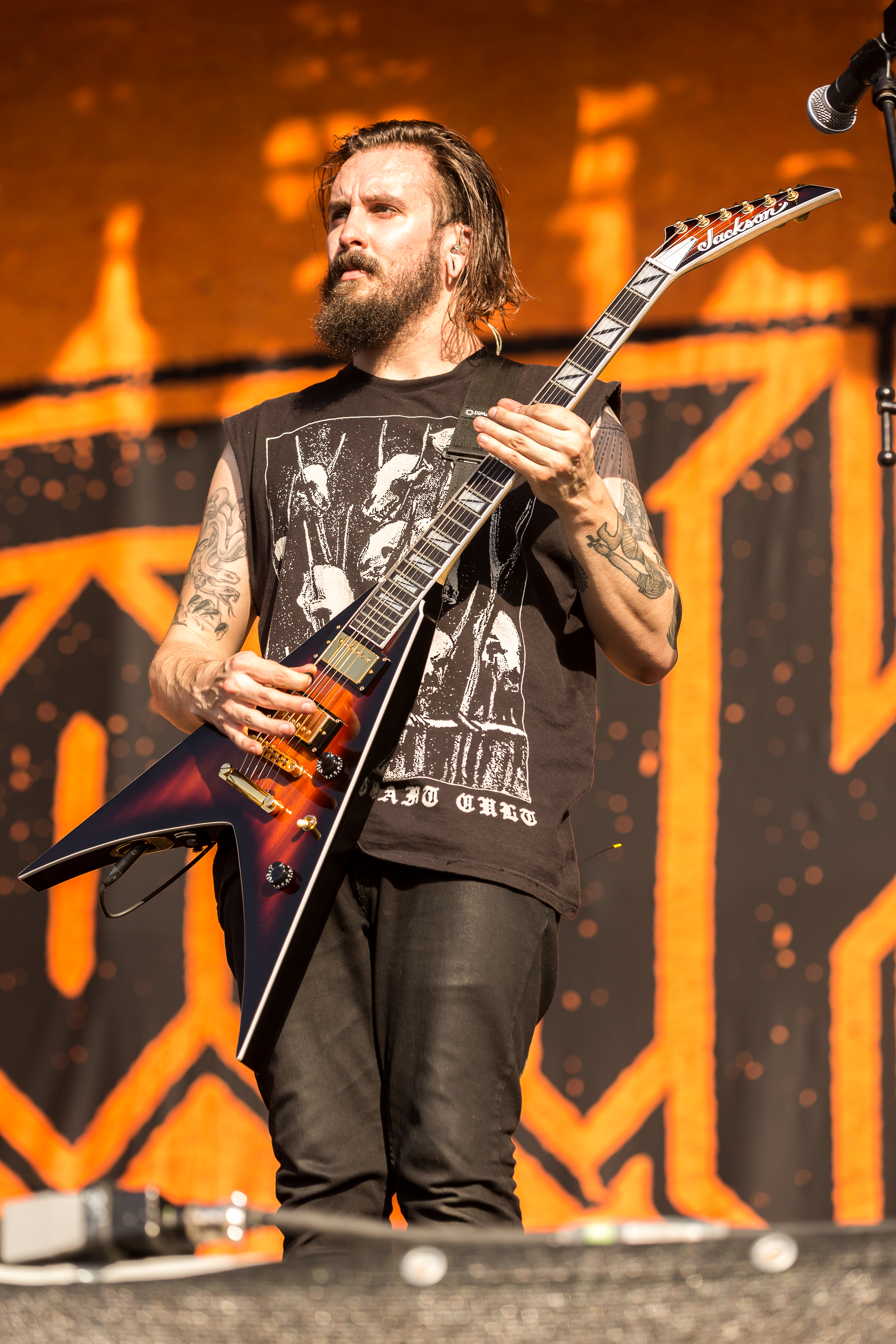
Lead guitarist Zach Huston

Current

- Caleb Shomo – lead vocals, all studio instruments (2012–present)
- Oshie Bichar – bass, backing vocals (2014–present)
- Connor Denis – drums, backing vocals (2018–present; touring 2016–2018)
- Zach Huston – lead guitar, backing vocals (2018–present)
- Will Deely – rhythm guitar, backing vocals (2021–present; fill-in for select shows 2019, 2020)

Former

- Nick Reed – bass, backing vocals (2013–2014)
- Brandon Mullins – drums (2013–2016)
- Taylor Lumley – lead guitar, backing vocals (2013–2018)
- Kamron Bradbury – rhythm guitar (2014–2020)

Timeline

== Discography ==
Studio albums

- Disgusting (2014)
- Aggressive (2016)
- Disease (2018)
- Below (2021)
- The Surface (2023)
- Pure Ecstasy (2026)

== Awards and nominations ==
| Nominated work | Year | Award ceremony | Category | Result | Ref. |
|---|---|---|---|---|---|
| Beartooth | 2015 | Metal Hammer Golden Gods Awards | Best New Band | Nominated | |
| Beartooth | 2015 | Kerrang! Awards | Best International Newcomer | Nominated | |
| Beartooth | 2015 | Alternative Press Music Awards | Best Breakthrough Band | Nominated | |
| Disgusting | 2015 | Alternative Press Music Awards | Best Album | Nominated | |
| "Beaten in Lips" | 2015 | Alternative Press Music Awards | Song of the Year | Nominated | |
| Beartooth | 2016 | Metal Hammer Golden Gods Awards | Best Breakthrough Band | Won | |
| Beartooth | 2016 | Alternative Press Music Awards | Best Live Band | Nominated | |
| Beartooth | 2016 | Alternative Press Music Awards | Best Artist | Nominated | |
| Caleb Shomo | 2016 | Alternative Press Music Awards | Vocalist of the Year | Nominated | |
| "Aggressive" | 2016 | Loudwire Music Awards | Best Rock Album | Won | |
| "Aggressive" | 2016 | Loudwire Music Awards | Best Rock Video | Won | |
| Beartooth | 2017 | Loudwire Music Awards | Breakthrough Band of the Year | Won | |
| Beartooth | 2017 | Alternative Press Music Awards | Best Live Band | Nominated | |
| "Aggressive" | 2017 | Alternative Press Music Awards | Best Album | Nominated | |
| Beartooth | 2022 | Heavy Music Awards | Best International Artist | Won | |
| "Free" | 2026 | Morecore Music Awards | Best Music Video | Nominated | |
