= Disgusting (album) =

Studio album by Beartooth
- Released: June 10, 2014
- Genres: Metalcore; hardcore punk
- Length: 42:25
- Labels: Red Bull; UNFD
- Producers: Caleb Shomo; John Feldmann

Beartooth chronology
Sick (2013)	Disgusting (2014)	Aggressive (2016)

Singles from Disgusting
- 1. "Beaten in Lips" Released: May 13, 2014; 2. "The Lines" Released: May 27, 2014; 3. "In Between" Released: May 30, 2014

Disgusting is the debut studio album by American rock band Beartooth. It was released on June 10, 2014, through Red Bull Records and UNFD Records. The single "Beaten In Lips" was released on May 13, 2014, along with the pre-order for the album.

== Background ==
This album was released a year after the band's debut EP Sick was released. Before the announcement, the band toured with metalcore band Of Mice & Men in the UK, and also played a headline show in London on April 17, 2014. The album was announced by the band a month prior to its release on May 13 and stated that the album would be released on June 10 through Red Bull Records. The recording process, according to Shomo, was very smooth since he has a studio in his house, and would write songs whenever he was bored or couldn't sleep in the middle of the night.

== Composition ==
In an interview with the lead singer, Shomo, he explained that the album was written to "...get my head on straight. I’m not trying to write songs to change the world," and went on to say that "This band is just me being honest with myself. I put in a whole lot of effort and time and more honesty and emotion than I’ve ever put into a record. I’m super-excited for people to hear that and for people to understand where I’ve been in the last year." He also continued to say that he was writing these lyrics while he was in a miserable state during his time with his former band Attack Attack! and that Beartooth was his means of escapism and therapy. The title of the album was also encouraged by how he felt when he wrote the record, stating he was in a "dark place".

The lyrics themselves seek to convey strong messages: "Beaten in Lips" for example tackles the topic of child abuse, encouraging victims to "keep living loud and proud", while "Relapsing" deals with alcoholism, an issue Shomo has publicly commented on before.

"I Have a Problem" also references alcoholism. However, during an interview on Silverstein vocalist Shane Told's podcast "Lead Singer Syndrome", Shomo stated that the track is mostly about him quitting Attack Attack!. Shomo then went on to say that he wrote the song the day before his departure from the band and that it was the second Beartooth song he had ever written.

== Release and promotion ==
The first new track to be heard from the album was "Dead" on April 30 as it was released with a live music video. As the band announced the album on May 13, the band also released a music video for the album's first official single "Beaten in Lips", which was also released on that day, along with the album made available for pre-orders. The single was featured in an article by Alternative Press titled '2 Songs You Need To Hear Before May 2014 Ends', promoting the band and the album. After the announcement, they started to stream each individual song on YouTube to promote the album's final release, with the entire album available by June 9, a day before the album's release. On May 30, the group released "In Between" for streaming.

Rolling Stone issued out an online article titled '10 New Artists You Need to Know: June 2014', of which Beartooth where mentioned with a statement saying; "Their debut full-length, Disgusting, follows a 2013 EP, Sick, and tours with August Burns Red and The Word Alive, and captures Shomo's knack for incisive, depressive lyrics with matchstick-thin silver linings." On April 7, 2015, they released a music video for "In Between", which was released as the final single from the album. The final video released from the album was for the song "Body Bag" in celebration for 2015. On December 2, 2015, the album was officially released in Japan and included three new bonus tracks, including a live cover of Ramones song Blitzkrieg Bop. On December 25, the band released a deluxe edition containing the Japanese bonus tracks and an alternate version of "The Lines" labeled as "Low Gain Mix". The band released another b-side called "Sick of It All" for free as part of the Red Bull: 20 before 16. Many have cited the album's significant thrash metal influence, with the song "Dead" being described as punk thrash.

== Critical reception ==
Professional ratings
Review scores
Source	Rating
Alternative Press	4.5/5 stars
HM magazine	4.5/5 stars
Rock Sound	8/10
Ultimate Guitar	5/10

The album was met with generally positive response from critics. Scott Heisel from Altpress stated that the band's sound is nothing like Shomo's previous band Attack Attack!; instead of having a metalcore influence, the band appear to have a more hardcore punk influence, which shows on this album, stating it was a mixture of sounds from bands A Day to Remember and Every Time I Die. The album is praised for having double-time passages, straightforward verses and plenty of breakdowns.

Justin Mabee of HM Magazine expressed that the intensity of this album surpasses that from their EP, stating that "...even “I Have a Problem," with the double kick furious in your ears, is tighter than before.", labeling the album having a mixture of thrash and hardcore music and praising Shomo's ability to create catchy chorus', great guitar riffs and how deep and meaningful the lyrics are. Rocksound reviewer David McLaughlin applauded Shomo's instinctive and not stylised screams and complimented the lyrics, stating that they "...are like bloodstained diary entries." and went on to say that it was Shomo's best work he has ever created so far.

A review on Ultimate Guitar gave the album a 5/10 rating, expressing that "despite it avoiding the overly-chuggy riffs and throwing away the cheesy synths that Attack Attack! used, it still isn't all that different as it sticks to a metalcore formula, although further expressing that it certainly is better in comparison."

== Commercial performance ==
In the United States, the album first entered the Billboard 200 at No. 48, and the Rock Albums chart at No. 19, selling around 7,000 copies in its first week. The album has sold 63,000 copies in the US as of May 2016. On July 7, 2020, the song "In Between" was certificated gold by RIAA.

== Awards and nominations ==
Awards and nominations for Disgusting
Year	Organization	Award	Result	Ref(s)
2015	Alternative Press Music Awards	Best Album	Nominated	

=== Accolades ===
Accolades for Disgusting
Publication	Accolade	Year	Rank	Ref.
Alternative Press	10 Essential Albums of 2014	2014	3	
Kerrang!	Album of the Year	2014	5	
Metal Hammer	Album of the Year	2014	24	
Rock Sound	Album of the Year	2014	2	

== Track listing ==
All songs written and composed by Caleb Shomo except where noted.

No.	Title	Music	Length
1.	"The Lines"		3:47
2.	"Beaten in Lips"		3:32
3.	"Body Bag"		3:49
4.	"In Between"	John Feldmann, Caleb Shomo	3:33
5.	"Relapsing"		3:55
6.	"Ignorance Is Bliss"		3:16
7.	"I Have a Problem"		4:00
8.	"One More"		3:37
9.	"Me in My Own Head"		3:26
10.	"Keep Your American Dream"		3:30
11.	"Dead"		2:15
12.	"Sick and Disgusting"		3:45
Total length:			42:25

Japanese edition
No.	Title	Length
13.	"Finish Line ^{[I]}"	3:00
14.	"Give It Up ^{[I]}"	4:30
15.	"Blitzkrieg Bop" (Ramones cover; live)	2:22
Total length:		52:17

Deluxe edition
No.	Title	Length
16.	"The Lines" (Low Gain mix)	3:02
Total length:		55:19

I "Finish Line" and "Give It Up" are two of the three known b-sides recorded during the original sessions for Beartooth's debut album Disgusting, the third being "Sick of It All".

== Personnel ==
Beartooth

- Caleb Shomo – vocals, all instruments

Production

- John Feldmann – A&R, composer, producer (track 4 only)
- Ted Jensen – mastering
- Kenny "Tick" Salcido – A&R
- Caleb Shomo – composer, engineer, mixer, producer (all tracks except track 4)

Additional personnel

- P.R. Brown – photography
- Dave Shapiro – booking agent
- Beckie Sugden – booking agent
- Thomas Gutches – band manager
- Bret Bair – band manager

== Charts ==
Chart (2014)	Peak; position
US Billboard 200	48
US Hard Rock Albums (Billboard)	6
US Independent Albums (Billboard)	13
US Rock Albums (Billboard)	19
UK Albums (OCC)	197
UK Rock & Metal Albums (OCC)	20

== Release history ==
Region	Date	Label	Format	Catalog
Worldwide	June 9, 2014	Red Bull Records	CD	RBR 3004UKCD
Worldwide	June 9, 2014	Red Bull Records	Digital download	RBR 3005UKDL
Worldwide	September 23, 2014	Red Bull Records	LP	RBR 03003US
