= Below (album) =

Studio album by Beartooth
- Released: June 25, 2021
- Studios: Capital House Studio, Columbus, Ohio, U.S.
- Genres: Post-hardcore; hard rock; metalcore
- Length: 44:36; 122:00 (Deluxe edition)
- Label: Red Bull
- Producers: Caleb Shomo; Oshie Bichar

Beartooth chronology
Disease (2018)	Below (2021)	The Surface (2023)

Singles from Below
- 1. "Devastation" Released: March 19, 2021; 2. "The Past Is Dead" Released: March 26, 2021; 3. "Hell of It" Released: April 23, 2021; 4. "Fed Up" Released: May 21, 2021; 5. "Skin" Released: June 25, 2021

Deluxe edition cover
- Artwork used for the deluxe edition cover

Below is the fourth studio album by American rock band Beartooth. The album was released on June 25, 2021, through Red Bull Records. It was produced by Caleb Shomo and Oshie Bichar. A deluxe edition of Below was released on March 18, 2022, with an additional 20 tracks.

== Background and promotion ==
On June 23, 2020, Shomo said that the band's fourth album, which he referred to as "LP4", was being recorded at Capital House Studio in Ohio. On December 8, Shomo stated on a Twitch stream in that he was "aiming for an album release by spring 2021" and that singles would "definitely" be released before then. On March 19, 2021, the band surprise released a new song called "Devastation" which saw their sound deviate from their metalcore roots, in favour of a hard rock/heavy metal feel.

On March 26, a week after the release of "Devastation", the band released the second single "The Past Is Dead" along with a corresponding music video. At the same time, the band announced the album itself, the album cover, the track list, and release date. On April 23, the band released the third single "Hell of It". On May 21, two weeks before the album release, the band unveiled the fourth single "Fed Up" which frontman Caleb Shomo revealed "was written mid lockdown" in 2020 during, and about the COVID-19 lockdowns. On June 25, the album's release date, the band debuted the fifth single "Skin" along with an accompanying music video.

== Critical reception ==
Professional ratings
Aggregate scores
Source	Rating
Metacritic	88/100
Review scores
Source	Rating
AllMusic	4.5/5 stars
Clash	8/10
Dead Press!	9/10
Distorted Sound	9/10
Kerrang!	4/5 stars
Metal Hammer	4/5 stars
New Noise	5/5 stars
Rock Sins	9/10
Wall of Sound	10/10

The album received critical acclaim from critics. At Metacritic, which assigns a normalised rating out of 100 to reviews from mainstream critics, the album has an average score of 88 out of 100 based on 4 reviews, indicating "universal acclaim". AllMusic gave the album a positive review but saying, "Combining those catchy flourishes with the band's trademark heaviness creates a great balance, and Below winds up being one of Beartooth's most enjoyable and immediate releases to date." Clash was positive towards the release stating, "Unapologetically heavy, with some spell-binding riffs and addictive hooks, Below takes us across twelve gritty tunes all reflective of the turbulence of fourteen months spent in isolation." Dead Press! rated the album positively, stating: "After three records of refining their hard rock driven metalcore, Caleb Shomo and co. have returned with Below. Displaying a confidence and an aptitude for mixing in various influences, Below sees Beartooth yet again deliver a collection of consistent, passionate, and at times surprising set of tracks." Distorted Sound scored the album 9 out of 10 and said: "Below is a true tour de force for BEARTOOTH. While the album isn't perfect in that one or two tracks are interchangeable, we let it slide. Below drains us of our negativity and leaves us feeling spent in the best possible way. The one thing we lack now is a live arena where we purge ourselves to the sound of madness."

Kerrang! gave the album 4 out of 5 and considered the release to be "The proof that Caleb Shomo is one of his generation's most remarkable songwriters: the deeper he dives, the higher Beartooth climb." Metal Hammer gave the album a positive review and stated that "Below is the kind of album we can all believe in." Caleb R. Newton from New Noise praised the album saying, "On Below, Beartooth sound like they'd fit well anywhere from a festival-size setting to a cramped rock club, as their energy alone seems poised to provide a compelling hook for observers." Simon Crampton of Rock Sins rated the album 9 out of 10 and said: "With Below it feels like they have made an album that showcases everything that made them such a great band in the first place, but it also feels like a love letter to their fans and the struggles they have battled and overcome together. It's a highly potent, powerful and ultimately uplifting album that will leave you wanting to hit the repeat button over and over again." Wall of Sound gave the album a perfect score 10/10 and saying: "And that brings us to the end of Beartooth's new opus Below. It's safe to say it sounds like Caleb is no longer trying to chase the metalcore sound that made Tooth a household name, instead, he's venturing into heavy metal/hard rock territory, showcasing a talent that's just dying to be heard by a vast array of heavy music fans who are yet to discover them. It seriously won't be long before these guys are playing with the big boys of metal and as a long term fan, I'm so bloody proud!"

== Track listing ==
All tracks are written by Caleb Shomo.

Below track listing
No.	Title	Length
1.	"Below"	3:49
2.	"Devastation"	3:41
3.	"The Past Is Dead"	3:35
4.	"Fed Up"	3:21
5.	"Dominate"	3:37
6.	"No Return"	3:49
7.	"Phantom Pain"	3:51
8.	"Skin"	3:18
9.	"Hell of It"	3:23
10.	"I Won't Give It Up"	3:46
11.	"The Answer"	3:39
12.	"The Last Riff"	4:41
Total length:		44:36

Deluxe edition bonus tracks
No.	Title	Length
13.	"Skin" (alternate universe edition)	3:42
14.	"Fighting Back"	3:21
15.	"Permanently Sealed"	3:08
16.	"Below" (live from the Journey Below)	4:32
17.	"Devastation" (live from the Journey Below)	3:39
18.	"Hated" (live from the Journey Below)	3:51
19.	"Sick of Me" (live from the Journey Below)	3:14
20.	"Fed Up" (live from the Journey Below)	3:48
21.	"Dominate" (live from the Journey Below)	3:55
22.	"The Lines" (live from the Journey Below)	3:46
23.	"Beaten in Lips" (live from the Journey Below)	3:50
24.	"Body Bag" (live from the Journey Below)	3:50
25.	"Hell of It" (live from the Journey Below)	3:42
26.	"Skin" (live from the Journey Below)	3:31
27.	"You Never Know" (live from the Journey Below)	3:44
28.	"Bad Listener" (live from the Journey Below)	3:54
29.	"Disease" (live from the Journey Below)	3:44
30.	"In Between" (live from the Journey Below)	3:39
31.	"The Past Is Dead" (live from the Journey Below)	4:10
32.	"The Last Riff" (live from the Journey Below)	6:51
Total length:		122:00

== Personnel ==
Credits adapted from Discogs.

Beartooth

- Caleb Shomo – lead vocals
- Zach Huston – lead guitar, backing vocals
- Will Deely – rhythm guitar, backing vocals
- Oshie Bichar – bass, backing vocals
- Connor Denis – drums, backing vocals

Additional personnel

- Caleb Shomo – engineering, mixing, mastering, production
- Oshie Bichar – production
- Nick Ingram – engineering
- Brandon Rike – art direction, creative direction
- Tnsn Dvsn – creative direction, design
- Joel Cook – creative direction
- Dedy Badic Art – illustration
- Caleb Davis and Nathaniel Utesch – art direction
- Kenny "Tick" Salcido – A&R

== Charts ==
Chart (2021)	Peak position
Australian Albums (ARIA)	42
Austrian Albums (Ö3 Austria)	18
Canadian Albums (Billboard)	100
German Albums (Offizielle Top 100)	10
Scottish Albums (Official Charts)	16
Swiss Albums (Schweizer Hitparade)	36
UK Albums (Official Charts)	39
UK Rock & Metal Albums (Official Charts)	3
US Billboard 200	30
US Independent Albums (Billboard)	2
US Top Hard Rock Albums (Billboard)	2
US Top Rock Albums (Billboard)	4
