= Red Bull Records =

Global record label

- Parent company: Red Bull GmbH
- Founded: 2007; 19 years ago
- Founder: Dietrich Mateschitz; Greg Hammer
- Distributor: The Orchard
- Genre: Rock; alternative rock; hip-hop; metal
- Country of origin: United States
- Location: West Hollywood, California, U.S.
- Official website: redbullrecords.com

Red Bull Records is an independent record label headquartered in Los Angeles, California. It is a subsidiary of the energy drink company Red Bull GmbH and has offices in Los Angeles and London. Since its inception, Red Bull Records has been home to artists and bands such as Albert Hammond Jr., Blxst, The Aces, Awolnation, Beartooth, House of Protection, Chris LaRocca, and Twin Atlantic.

== History ==
Red Bull Records was founded by Dietrich Mateschitz in July 2007 with the help of Greg Hammer, as an independent label focused on artist development.

Red Bull Records expanded its suite of services in 2008 by establishing its Publishing division, representing songwriters and producers such as John Feldmann (5 Seconds of Summer), Charlie Shuffler (Lil Yachty, Trippie Redd), Eric Aukstikalnis (Dolly Parton, Galantis) and LordQuest (SiR, ScHoolboy Q).

The label's first major success was in 2011 when Awolnation released their debut album Megalithic Symphony. The album went on to become platinum certified and featured the song “Not Your Fault” which is gold certified and the band's most notable single "Sail", which is diamond certified in the U.S. and has been certified platinum and gold in multiple countries. The single spent 79 weeks on the Billboard Hot 100 charts, making it the fourth longest single ever to stay on the Hot 100, surpassed only by Glass Animals "Heat Waves", Imagine Dragons’ "Radioactive" and The Weeknd's "Blinding Lights". The band’s sophomore release, Run, came in 2015 and included No. 1 hit “Hollow Moon (Bad Wolf)” as well as Top 5 tracks “I Am” and “Woman Woman.”

Red Bull Records' first international signing was Scottish rock band Twin Atlantic. The band has released four studio albums to date with the label: Vivarium, Free, Great Divide and GLA, and the band made their BBC national TV debut on Later… with Jools Holland on October 4, 2016.

In 2013, the label signed its first metalcore band Beartooth. The band was formed in 2012 by frontman Caleb Shomo in Columbus, OH, and has released five studio albums on Red Bull Records: Disgusting, Aggressive, Disease, Below, and The Surface. Beartooth won the Metal Hammer Award for Best Breakthrough Band of 2016 and the Loudwire Award for Breakthrough Artist of the Year 2017, and the Heavy Music Awards for Best International Artist in 2022. In 2024, Beartooth's single "In Between" was certified Platinum in the United States. In October 2023, Beartooth released their fifth studio album, The Surface, which debuted at #1 on Luminate and Billboard Hard Rock Albums chart, #5 on Billboard’s Album Sales chart and #42 on the Billboard 200 chart, before embarking on their most successful North American headline tour to date. In November 2023, Beartooth earned their first #1 on Billboard's Mainstream Rock Airplay chart for their song "Might Love Myself" off of their album The Surface. In May of the following year, they scored their second #1 on Billboard’s Mainstream Rock Airplay chart for The Surface single, "I Was Alive". In September 2024, they released The Surface (Deluxe Edition) featuring new single “ATTN.” accompanied by an official music video.

Spanish rapper Arkano rose to fame in 2015 when he claimed the champion title at Red Bull Batalla de Gallos Internacional, which became the second most-viewed Spanish rap battle on YouTube. In 2016, he set the Guinness World Record for the longest freestyle rap session, clocking over 24 hours. Arkano signed with Red Bull Records in 2021 and released his sophomore album MATCH in 2022.

The Aces, indie-pop band out of Provo, Utah, first signed with Red Bull Records in 2016. They released their first EP I Don’t Like Being Honest with Red Bull Records in June 2017. Their debut full-length album, When My Heart Felt Volcanic, came the following year in April 2018. Later that year, The Aces made their late-night TV debut, where they performed two tracks off of the album – “Last One” and “Waiting For You” – live on Late Night with Seth Meyers. Since then, they have released two more albums – Under My Influence (2020) and I’ve Loved You For So Long (2023) – which clocked Billboard debuts at #4 on Alternative New Artist Albums and #25 on Heatseekers charts.

Albert Hammond Jr, guitarist of the Grammy-winning band The Strokes, signed with Red Bull Records in 2018 for the release of his fourth solo album, Francis Trouble. Ahead of the album’s release in March, Albert Hammond Jr performed new single “Muted Beatings” on the Conan show in February 2018. In 2023, Albert Hammond Jr released his fifth solo album Melodies on Hiatus (2023) with Red Bull Records.

In 2020, Red Bull Records added Grammy-nominated artist Blxst to the roster. Blxst's billion-streaming debut EP "No Love Lost" peaked at #3 on the Billboard Heatseekers chart. Since the EP’s release, “Overrated” has been certified Gold, and “Chosen” went #1 at Urban & Rhythmic Radio and is Platinum certified . In 2021, Blxst made his debut TV performance, performing “Chosen” with Ty Dolla $ign on The Tonight Show Starring Jimmy Fallon. Blxst received Billboard’s first ever Rising Star award at their 2021 R&B/Hip-Hop Summit, and was named Billboard’s R&B/Hip-Hop Rookie of the Year in 2022. XXL welcomed Blxst as a member of their 2021 XXL Freshman Class, where he was listed amongst other breakout artists, and the following year he won XXL Best New Artist of the Year. In April 2022, Blxst released his second EP Before You Go, which included his track “About You” which has since been certified Gold. In May of that same year, he appeared on Kendrick Lamar's album Mr. Morale & the Big Steppers, on the song "Die Hard" with Amanda Reifer which earned him two Grammy nominations at the 2023 ceremony. In April 2024, Blxst made his debut appearance at Coachella, performing on the festival’s Outdoor Theater where he brought out surprise guest Feid to premiere their new single, “Rewind” which is Latin gold certified. On July 19, 2024, Blxst released his debut album I’ll Always Come Find You, a 20-track concept album featuring artists like Ty Dolla $ign, Anderson .Paak, 2 Chainz, Feid, Becky G, Offset, and the late Fatman Scoop.

== Partnerships ==
=== Evgle ===
Evgle is the multidisciplinary entertainment company founded by Matthew “Blxst” Burdette and business partners Victor Burnett and Karl Fowlkes in 2015. The Los Angeles-based company operates a record label, production company, clothing brand, publishing company, and investment arm. After first signing with Red Bull Records in 2020, Blxst renewed his deal with the label in 2021 – allowing Red Bull Records to not only release his music, but also jointly sign artists to Red Bull Records/Evgle. Rapper Jay Millian was the first artist to sign to Red Bull Records/Evgle with his single “Baby” dropping in May 2023 as part of the Evgle-curated NBA 2K23 Season 7 Soundtrack, followed by Maryland-born rapper Joony in September, in partnership with his own 211 Collective.

=== Wonderchild ===
In 2021, Red Bull Records and Canadian record producer and songwriter WondaGurl announced a new partnership between her label Wonderchild Records and Red Bull Records. During this time, it was also announced that Toronto rapper JUGGER would be the first signing – with WondaGurl executive producing his next project. In 2023, Red Bull Records and Wonderchild jointly signed Canadian producer, singer-songwriter, and multi-instrumentalist Chris LaRocca ahead of his EP perhaps! dropping later that year. LaRocca’s debut album i cried my eyes out was released October 2023, followed by his award winning short film “linger” produced by Kid. Studio and directed by cinematographer, writer, and director James Arthurs. The short film earned multiple accolades including a Bronze Lion at Cannes Lions for “Excellence in Music Video” and “Best Music Video” at the Oniros Film Awards and New York International Film Awards.

=== Mind of a Genius ===
In 2021, Red Bull Records signed hip-hop artist Peter $un in partnership with independent label Mind of a Genius. In 2023, Peter $un returned with his project 3PIECE on Red Bull Records/Mind of a Genius as well as his short film $unny Daze: The Metamorphosis of a Single in partnership with Red Bull Media House and Ghetto Film School.

=== Red Bull Batalla ===
Red Bull Batalla is the world’s largest Spanish-language freestyle rap competition. Since 2021, Red Bull Records has partnered to release the recordings from the live battles on digital platforms.

== Artists ==
=== Current artists ===
- Albert Hammond Jr
- Chris LaRocca
- CVIRO & GXNXVS
- House of Protection
- James Vickery
- Jay Millian
- Joony
- Morgan
- Peter $un

=== Former artists ===
- Beartooth
- Blxst
- Blitz Kids
- The Aces
- Arkano
- Awolnation
- August 08
- Black Gold
- Blitz Kids (Disbanded)
- Five Knives (band) (Disbanded)
- Flawes
- Gavin Haley
- London Richards
- Heaven's Basement (Disbanded)
- Innerpartysystem (Disbanded)
- Itch
- JUGGER
- Kofi
- Kyle Banks
- New Beat Fund
- pineappleCITI
- sad alex
- Twin Atlantic
- Will Claye
- Warm Brew
- Rouri404

== Discography ==
- Beartooth - Below
- Albert Hammond Jr. – Francis Trouble
- Beartooth - Disease
- August 8 - Father
- The Aces - When My Heart Felt Volcanic
- Awolnation - Here Come the Runts
- The Aces - I Don't Like Being Honest EP
- Warm Brew - Diagnosis
- Beartooth - Aggressive
- Flawes - CTRL
- Flawes - UNSPKN
- Twin Atlantic - GLA
- New Beat Fund - Sponge Fingerz
- Awolnation - Run
- Five Knives - Savages
- Beartooth - Disgusting
- Twin Atlantic - Great Divide
- Itch - The Deep End
- Five Knives - The Rising Remixes
- Blitz Kids - The Good Youth
- Beartooth - Sick EP
- New Beat Fund - Coinz
- Heaven's Basement - Filthy Empire
- Five Knives - The Rising
- Awolnation - Megalithic Symphony
- Innerpartysystem - Never Be Content EP
- Twin Atlantic - Free
- Black Gold - Rush
- Twin Atlantic - Vivarium
- The Aces - Under My Influence
- The Aces - I've Loved You For So Long
- Rouri404 - Chlorine
- Rouri404 - Crows

== See also ==
- List of record labels
