= Caleb Shomo =

American musician (born 1992)

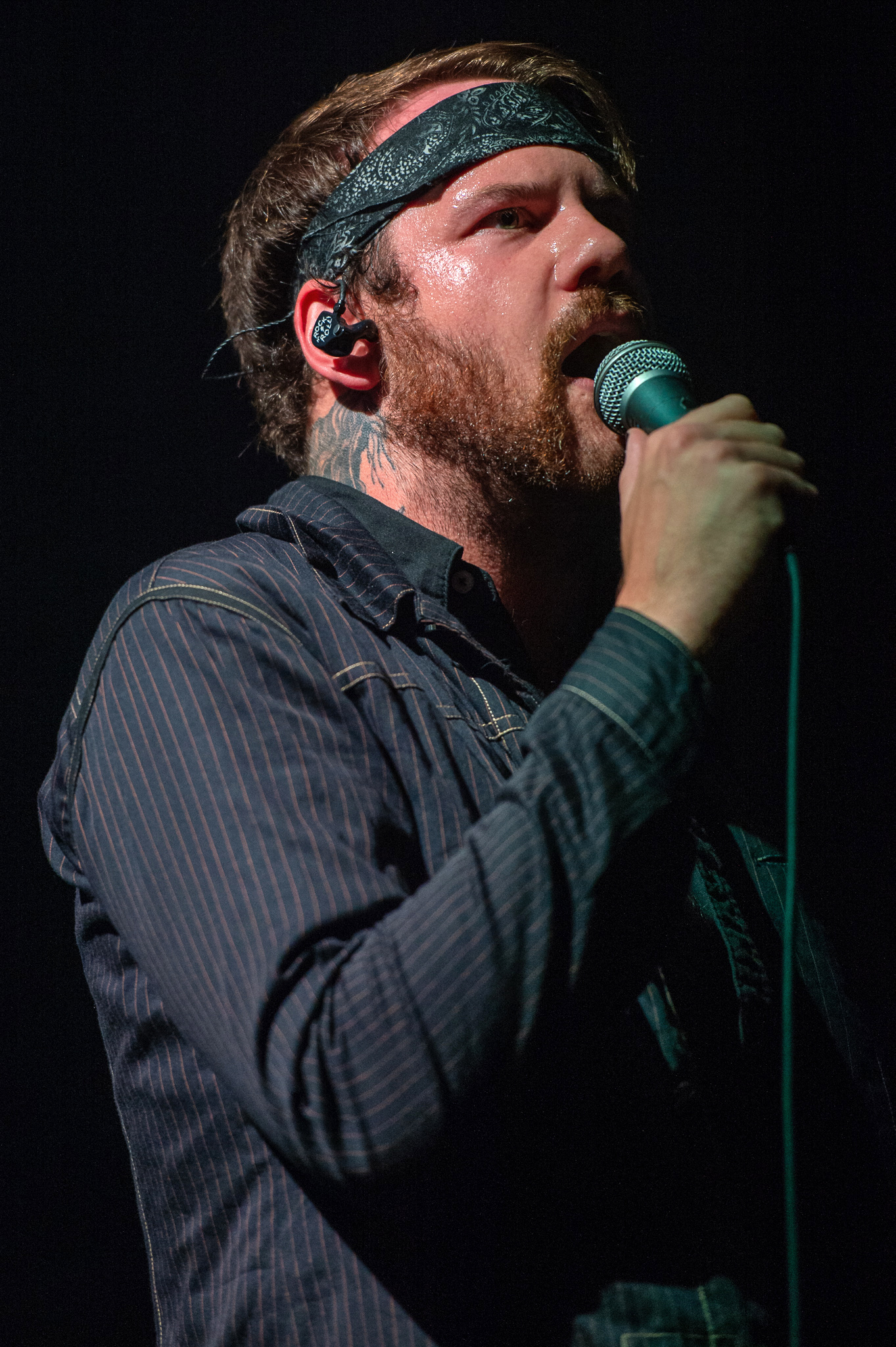
- Shomo at Rock im Park 2019

Background information
- Born: Caleb Joshua Shomo; December 1, 1992 (age 33)
- Origin: Columbus, Ohio, U.S.
- Genres: Metalcore; post-hardcore; electronicore; hard rock; melodic hardcore; pop-punk; hardcore punk; alternative metal
- Occupations: Singer; musician; songwriter; producer
- Instruments: Vocals; guitar; bass; keyboards; synthesizer; programming; drums
- Years active: 2006–present
- Member of: Beartooth
- Formerly of: Attack Attack!
- Spouse: Fleur Shomo (m. 2012; div. 2026)

Caleb Joshua Shomo (born December 1, 1992) is an American singer, musician, songwriter, and producer. He is most well known as the lead-vocalist of Beartooth, though he records all studio instrumentals for the band. He is also the former lead vocalist, keyboardist, and early backing vocalist of Attack Attack!, and the owner of Studio Records in Columbus, Ohio. Shomo joined Attack Attack! as keyboardist at 15 years old while maintaining a passion for electronic music and eventually grew into record production by 18.

Shomo has been referred to as "one of the current scene's most beloved figures." In 2023, Jake Richardson of Loudwire included him in his list of the "10 Best Clean Singers in Metalcore".

== Early life ==
Shomo was raised in Westerville, Ohio, since he was ten years old. His father was a pastor of a church and his mother works as a nurse, and also was a part of a church band. As a result, he grew up going to church, however, he saw "a lot of damage" it had done to people in his life and to his family, and has since moved away from religion. Despite this, he stated that he "will always have respect and understanding of it," as it played a big role in his life. He began getting into music at the age of four, as he grew up in a musical family. His grandfather was a gospel singer and his uncle played in bands in the 1970s. He started taking piano lessons at a young age, before quitting to learn guitar, bass and drums all at the same time when he was ten. From the age of ten, Shomo has suffered from depression and anxiety, and was misdiagnosed with ADHD since he had trouble concentrating. When he was in high school, he met and befriended Attack Attack! member, Johnny Franck. He dropped out of high school at the age of 15 to focus on the band and touring full-time.

== Career ==
=== Attack Attack! (2008–2012) ===
In 2006, Shomo joined Attack Attack!, an American metalcore band from Westerville, Ohio, formed in 2005 as a synth player and programmer when he was 14 and a freshman in high school. He joined the group after he was asked by his friends who were looking for a keyboard player. The addition of his keyboard and synth playing was influential on the band's sound. In 2008, they signed to Rise Records and released their debut studio album Someday Came Suddenly on November 11. It peaked on the Billboard 200 at number 193.

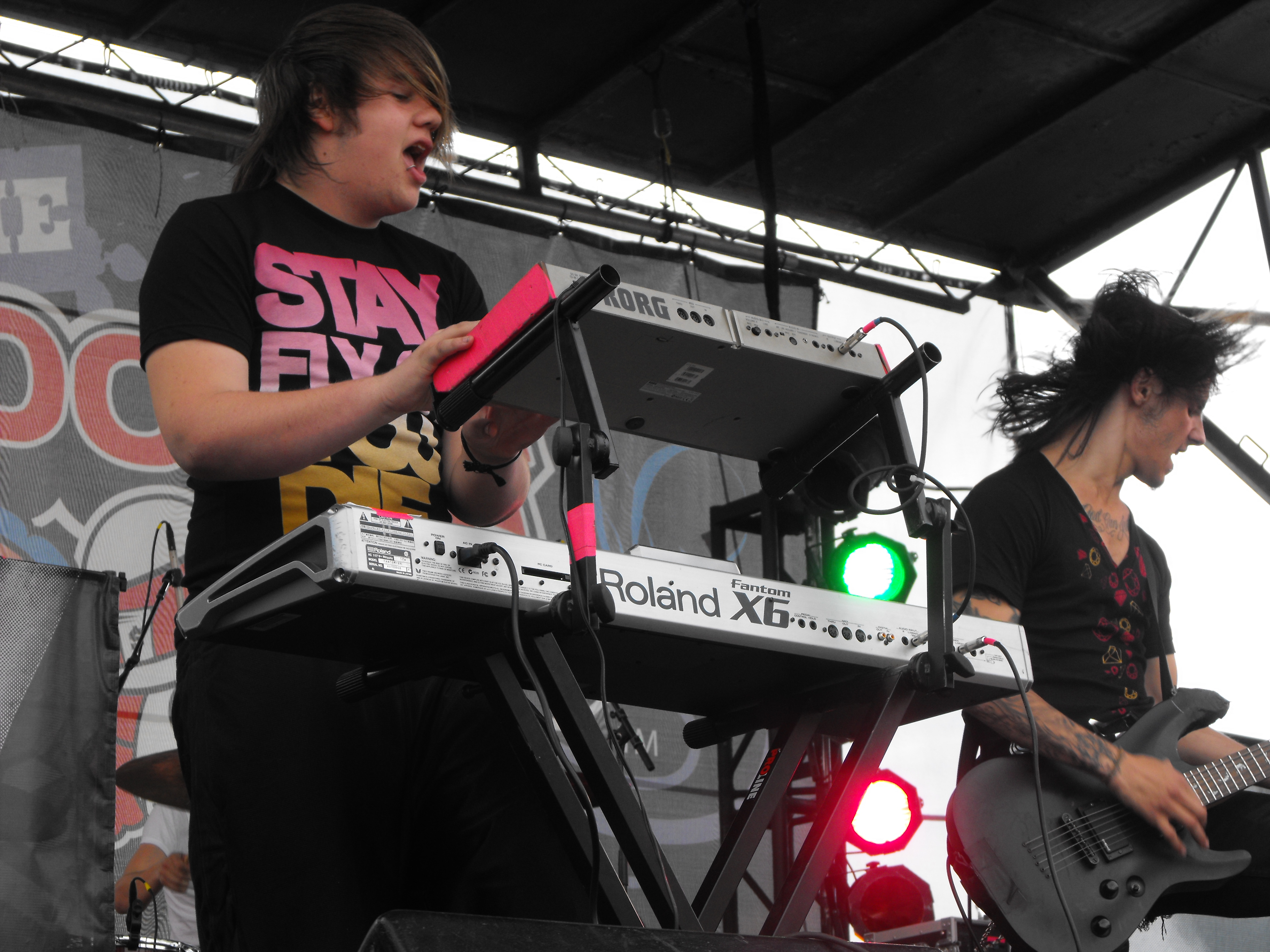
Shomo (left) performing with Attack Attack! at Bamboozle Festival 2009

In late 2009, Shomo became the group's primary vocalist, following the departure of Nick Barham. According to Shomo, he had to learn how to sing and struggled how to do scream vocals, but managed to get through it. They released their self-titled second studio album on June 8, 2010, and peaked at number 27 on the Billboard 200, selling more than 15,000 copies in its first week. Shomo features clean vocals on tracks 1 to 5 and 17 and 18 of their deluxe release of their second album. In November 2011, the band announced their third studio album titled This Means War. It was released on January 17, 2012, and has since become the band's best charting Billboard topping album, debuting and peaking at number 11 on the Billboard 200, selling more than 17,000 copies in its first week.

Despite the band's growing success, Caleb Shomo left the band later that year due to clinical depression he had been dealing with since middle school. This had been causing him to have suicidal tendencies, and struggle with eating disorders, self-image problems and various substance abuse and addictions for the past year. Despite this, he left the band on good terms with the rest of the band supporting his decision. The band itself officially disbanded in May the same year.

=== Beartooth (2012–present) ===
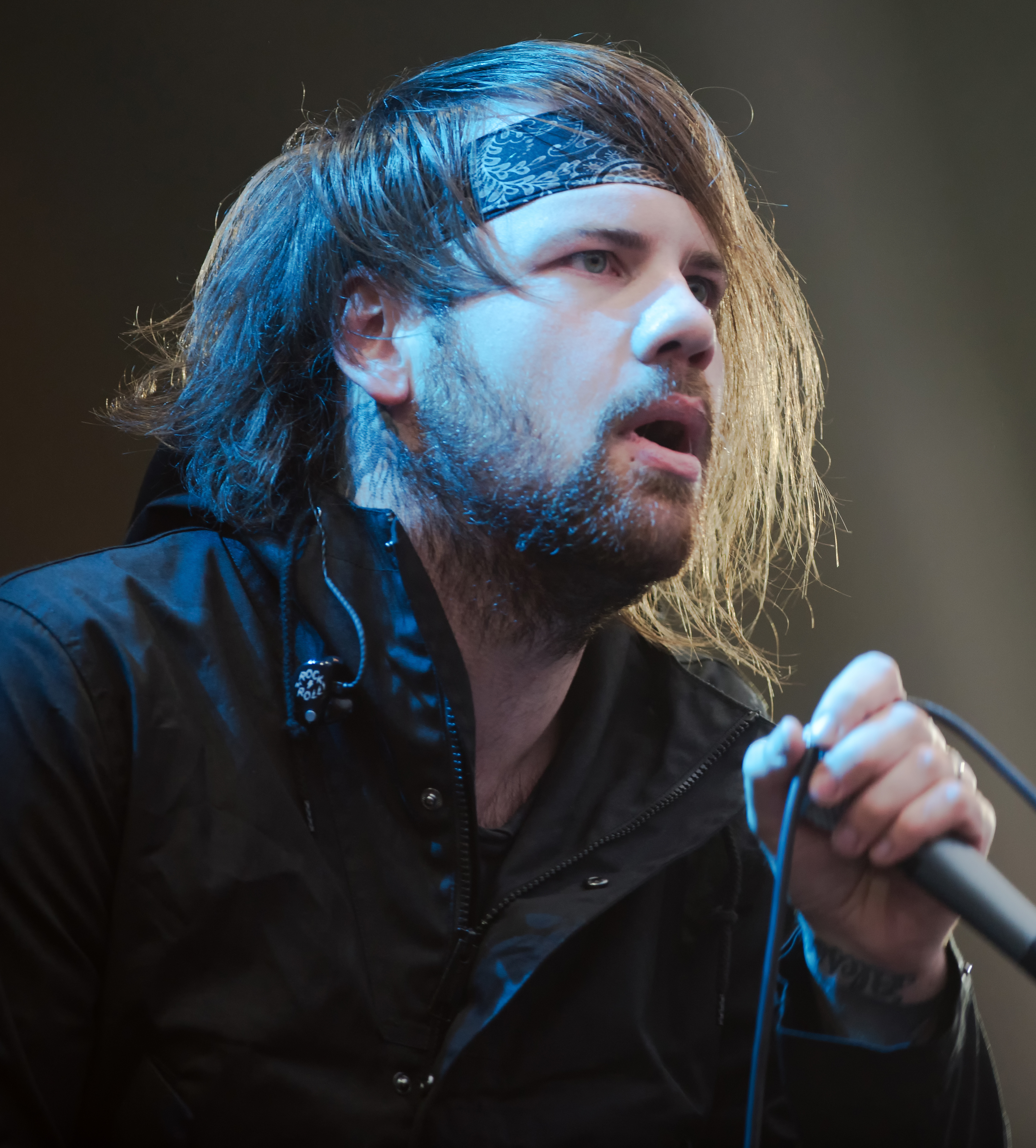
Shomo performing with Beartooth at Reload Festival 2018

Caleb Shomo began writing Beartooth songs while he was still in Attack Attack! as "a different musical outlet". Shomo has said the band originally "started as a joke band" with members of My Ticket Home, as a way to make fun, punk-rock, hardcore, wild music, play crazy shows and have a good time without pressure from anything. He wrote and recorded everything with all the instruments and did all of the production for their music. The band was originally called Noise, but was switched to Beartooth upon realization the name was already taken.

On June 7, 2013, Shomo announced that Beartooth was now signed to Red Bull Records. Beartooth released their debut EP Sick for free on their website on July 26, 2013. On May 13, 2014, the band's Facebook page announced the release date for their debut album, Disgusting, as June 10, 2014, along with its track listing. The band released their first single of the album the same day, titled 'Beaten in Lips', along with its music video. The album was available to stream online a day before its release.

On June 3, 2016, Beartooth released another album titled Aggressive, with the headlining track of the album posing the same name. In an interview with Kerrang! Magazine, Shomo stated that he felt that the album had a much happier outlook than the previous album, Disgusting. That being said, he still cites that there are parts of the album that refer to the constant battle that he faces with clinical depression, and mentions that is shown in the song "Find a Way". The songs "Aggressive", "Always Dead", "Loser", and "Hated", were all released prior to the album being released.

On July 18, 2018, the songs "Infection", "Disease", and "Believe" leaked online forcing the band to reveal the name of their new album, Disease, the tracklisting and its artwork. On September 28, Beartooth released their third studio album "Disease". During writing and recording the "Disease" album, a mini-series of videos about 'making of' of the album were posted on YouTube, named after one of the songs "Greatness or Death" from the third album.

=== Class (2012–present) ===
Along with the announcement of Beartooth after departing from Attack Attack!, he also announced in 2012 that he started making electronic music under the name Class (stylized in all caps). In an interview with Alternative Press, he expressed that he had always loved electronic music and had been creating such music since before he joined Attack Attack!. He self-released an EP consisting of four tracks on January 2, 2013. Since the release the project has remained inactive, but when asked about it, he responded with: "I'm ready to go full-force with that. A few of the deals we're working on are addressing the whole thing."

On December 10, 2020, Austrian duo CueStack released their Through the Night EP featuring David Hasselhoff's first heavy metal performance. A remix of the song produced by Shomo was also released.

== Personal life ==
In 2012, he left Attack Attack! citing "horrible clinical depression" and revealed that he had been suicidal since middle school. Sometime that year (around April 1 according to Fleur's Instagram account), he married Fleur Shomo. In 2014 when interviewed by Kerrang!, he stated that, thanks to the success of his musical career, he was moving into a new home where he would build a new sunlit studio to record his own music and produce for others.

On May 23, 2026, Shomo publicly came out as gay, and the couple announced their divorce.

== Discography ==
Attack Attack!

For a more comprehensive list, see Attack Attack! discography.
- Someday Came Suddenly (2008)
- Attack Attack! (2010)
- This Means War (2012)

Beartooth

For a more comprehensive list, see Beartooth discography.
- Disgusting (2014)
- Aggressive (2016)
- Disease (2018)
- Below (2021)
- The Surface (2023)
- Pure Ecstasy (2026)

Class

- Stereo Typical EP (2012)

=== Guest appearances ===
Song	Year	Artist	Album
"Dead Weight"	2010	My Ticket Home	The Opportunity to Be
"The Solitary Life"	2011	In Fear and Faith	Symphonies
"Shadow Stalker"	2011	Legend	The Pale Horse
"Ascension"	2011	I Am Abomination	Passion of the Heist
"I Made a Song on Garage Band and All I Got Was a Lousy Record Deal"	2011	City Lights	In It to Win It
"Make Me Believe It"	2012	The Dead Rabbitts	Edge of Reality
"With Our Friend[s] All Behind Us"	2012	Woe, Is Me	Genesi[s]
"Live Fast, Die Beautiful"	2013	Escape the Fate	Ungrateful
"Scheme Artist"	2013	Sylar	Deadbeat
"Undead Anthem"	2013	Tear Out The Heart	Violence
"Survive"	2015	Gideon	Calloused
"Ghost in the Mirror"	2015	Crossfaith	Xeno
"Scatter My Ashes Along the Coast or Don't"	2017	Seaway	Vacation
"Burn It Down"	2019	Silverstein	A Beautiful Place to Drown
"ACTION (with Taka Moriuchi, Tyler Carter, and Tilian Pearson)"	2019	Don Broco	Action
"Thicc Thiccly"	2019	Bilmuri	Rich Sips
"The Lottery"	2020	The Used	Heartwork
"Black Hole"	2021	We Came as Romans	Darkbloom
"Set the Room Ablaze"	2021	Can't Swim	Change of Plans
"Red, White & Boom"	2022	Motionless in White	Scoring the End of the World
"Cut the Line" (new version)	2023	Papa Roach	Non-album single

=== Production credits ===
Album title	Release date	Artist	Label	Credits
Attack Attack! (deluxe edition re-issue)	June 8, 2010	Attack Attack!	Rise	Engineer, mastering, mixing, producer, programming
The Pale Horse	May 16, 2011	Legend	Rise	Composer, lyricist
This Means War	January 17, 2012	Attack Attack!	Rise	Engineer, mixing, producer
To Create a Cure	January 31, 2012	My Ticket Home	Rise	Engineer, mastering, mixing, producer
Violence	March 19, 2013	Tear Out The Heart	Victory	Producer
Ungrateful	May 14, 2013	Escape the Fate	Eleven Seven	Composer
Sick	July 26, 2013	Beartooth	Red Bull	Composer, producer
To Whom It May Concern	May 12, 2014	Sylar	Razor & Tie	Engineer, mastering, mixing, producer
Disgusting	June 10, 2014	Beartooth	Red Bull	Composer, engineer, mixing, producer
Vans Warped Tour 2014 Compilation	June 10, 2014	Various	Side One Dummy	Composer
Shapeshifter	July 1, 2014	The Dead Rabbitts	Tragic Hero	Composer
Dead, Everywhere	January 27, 2015	Tear Out The Heart	Victory	Composer, engineer, mixing, producer
Earthbound	January 29, 2016	Bury Tomorrow	Nuclear Blast Records	Composer, engineer, mixing, producer
Aggressive	June 3, 2016	Beartooth	Red Bull	Composer, engineer, mixing, producer
Dark Divine	November 3, 2017	Like Moths to Flames	Rise	Mixing, mastering
Disease	September 28, 2018	Beartooth	Red Bull	Composer, engineer, mixing, producer
Below	June 25, 2021	Beartooth	Red Bull	Composer, engineer, mixing, mastering, producer
