= Zakk Cervini production discography =

The following list is a discography of production by Zakk Cervini, an American record producer, songwriter, and mixing engineer.

== Albums and EPs ==
=== 2010s ===
Title	Year	Artist(s)	Credit	Ref.
Chasing Ghosts	2012	The Amity Affliction	Editing	
Sports	2012	Modern Baseball	Mastering	
Earth Rocker	2013	Clutch	Assistant producer	
Singularity	2013	Northlane	Editing	
Disobedient	2015	Stick to Your Guns	Editing, engineering, mixing, production, programming	
Future Hearts	2015	All Time Low	Engineering, programming, additional production, editing	
Madness	2015	Sleeping with Sirens	Engineering, mixing	
Sounds Good Feels Good	2015	5 Seconds of Summer	Engineering, programming, production, editing	
The Shadow Side	2016	Andy Black	Mixing, engineering	
California	2016	Blink-182	Additional production, engineering, mixing	
Youth Authority	2016	Good Charlotte	Engineering, editing, programming, additional production	
The Knife	2017	Goldfinger	Mixing, production, bass guitar, guitar, keyboards	
Vale	2018	Black Veil Brides	Engineering, editing, mixing, additional production	
Summer is a Curse EP	2018	The Faim	Mixing, engineering	
Generation Rx	2018	Good Charlotte	Production	
In Our Wake	2018	Atreyu	Mixing, engineering	
Strength in Numb333rs	2019	Fever 333	Mixing, engineering	
Strange Love EP	2019	Simple Creatures	Engineering, mixing, production	
How It Feels to Be Lost	2019	Sleeping with Sirens	Production, engineering, mixing	
Everything Opposite EP	2019	Simple Creatures	Engineering, production	
Proxy: An A.N.I.M.O. Story	2019	Being as an Ocean	Mixing, production	
Fandom	2019	Waterparks	Production, engineering, mastering, mixing	
Champion	2019	Bishop Briggs	Mixing	

=== 2020s ===
Title	Year	Artist(s)	Credit	Ref.
I Disagree	2020	Poppy	Production	
Bandaids EP	2020	Keshi	Mixing	
Wake Up, Sunshine	2020	All Time Low	Production, engineering, mixing	
Post Human: Survival Horror	2020	Bring Me the Horizon	Mixing	
Weird!	2020	Yungblud	Production, programming, engineering	
For Those That Wish to Exist	2021	Architects	Mixing	
Greatest Hits	2021	Waterparks	Production	
Still Sucks	2021	Limp Bizkit	Production, mastering, mixing	
The Death of Peace of Mind	2022	Bad Omens	Mixing, mastering	
Harder Than It Looks	2022	Simple Plan	Production, mixing	
Scoring the End of the World	2022	Motionless in White	Mixing	
Vaxis – Act II: A Window of the Waking Mind	2022	Coheed and Cambria	Production, mixing, engineering	
Reaching Hypercritical	2022	Palisades	Engineering	
Hotel Kalifornia	2022	Hollywood Undead	Mixing	
Unwanted	2022	Pale Waves	Production, programming	
Darker Still	2022	Parkway Drive	Mixing	
The Classic Symptoms of a Broken Spirit	2022	Architects	Mixing	
Remember That You Will Die	2022	Polyphia	Engineering	
The End of Yesterday	2022	Ellegarden	Mixing	
Tell Me I'm Alive	2023	All Time Low	Production, mixing	
TZIA	2023	Meg Myers	Mixing	
Intellectual Property	2023	Waterparks	Production, mixing	
A Call to the Void	2023	Hot Milk	Production, mixing	
Bleed Out	2023	Within Temptation	Mixing	
Zig	2023	Poppy	Mixing	
The Fear of Fear EP	2023	Spiritbox	Mixing, engineering	
Vol. 1 EP	2024	The Plot in You	Mixing, mastering	
Vol. 2 EP	2024	The Plot in You	Mixing, mastering	
Vol. 3 EP	2024	The Plot in You	Mixing, mastering	
Exit Emotions	2024	Blind Channel	Mixing	
Searching for Solace	2024	The Ghost Inside	Mixing	
Post Human: Nex Gen	2024	Bring Me the Horizon	Mixing, mastering, programming	
Concrete Jungle [The OST]	2024	Bad Omens	Mastering	
Carnal	2024	Nothing More	Mastering	
Galore EP	2024	House of Protection	Mastering, mixing	
Stigma	2024	Wage War	Mixing	
Negative Spaces	2024	Poppy	Mixing, mastering	
Big Ole Album Vol. 1	2025	A Day to Remember	Production, mixing	
The Sky, the Earth & All Between	2025	Architects	Mastering, mixing	
Tsunami Sea	2025	Spritbox	Mixing	
Vaxis – Act III: The Father of Make Believe	2025	Coheed and Cambria	Production, mixing, engineering	
Surrender EP	2025	Amira Elfeky	Production, programming, bass guitar, guitar, keyboards	
Afterglow	2025	Sleep Theory	Mixing	
Outrun You All EP	2025	House of Protection	Mixing	
Alienation	2025	Three Days Grace	Production, mixing	
Silos	2025	Starset	Mixing	
The Wheel	2025	I See Stars	Mixing	
Violent Nature	2025	I Prevail	Mixing	
Creature in the Black Night	2025	Dayseeker	Mixing, mastering	
Flowers	2025	The Devil Wears Prada	Mixing, mastering	
Empty Hands	2026	Poppy	Mixing, mastering	
Reflections	2026	From Ashes to New	Mixing	
Vindicate	2026	Black Veil Brides	Mixing, mastering	
Sanctuary	2026	Evanescence	Production, mixing	
The Plot in You	2026	The Plot in You	Mastering, mixing	
Decades	2026	Motionless in White	Mastering, mixing	
Jinx	2026	Waterparks	Production, mixing	
A Fate Worse Than Loneliness EP	2026	Showing Teeth	Mixing, mastering	

== Singles ==
Title	Year	Artist(s)	Album	Credit	Ref.
"Good Girls"	2014	5 Seconds of Summer	5 Seconds of Summer	Engineering, editing, programming, additional production, mixing	
"The Nights"	2014	Avicii	The Days / The Nights EP	Engineering, vocal production	
"Sick of Me"	2016	Beartooth	Aggressive	Engineering	
"I Was King"	2017	One Ok Rock	Ambitions	Mixing, engineering, editing, programming, additional production	
"Too Much to Think"	2017	311	Mosaic	Mixing, engineering	
"'Til the City's on Fire"	2017	311	Mosaic	Mixing, engineering	
"Afterall"	2018	Beartooth	Disease	Production	
"We Appreciate Power" (featuring Hana)	2018	Grimes	Miss Anthropocene	Mixing	
"X"	2018	Poppy	Am I a Girl?	Mixing, production	
"Loner"	2019	Yungblud	Non-album single	Production, engineering	
"11 Minutes" (featuring Travis Barker)	2019	Yungblud & Halsey	Non-album single	Production, programming	
"Scary Mask" (featuring Fever333)	2019	Poppy	Choke	Production	
"I Think I'm Okay"	2019	MGK, Yungblud & Travis Barker	Hotel Diablo	Engineering, additional production	
"Time in a Bottle"	2019	Yungblud	Hobbs & Shaw	Production	
"Parents"	2019	Yungblud	The Underrated Youth EP	Production, programming	
"Hope for the Underrated Youth"	2019	Yungblud	The Underrated Youth EP	Production, programming, engineering	
"Bad Life"	2022	Sigrid & Bring Me the Horizon	How to Let Go	Production	
"Crosses" (featuring Spencer Chamberlain)	2022	Sleeping with Sirens	Complete Collapse	Production	
"Ctrl + Alt + Del"	2022	Sleeping with Sirens	Complete Collapse	Production	
"Code Mistake" (featuring Bring Me the Horizon)	2023	Corpse Husband	Non-album single	Production	
"Girl$" (featuring PVRIS and Bruses)	2024	Stand Atlantic	Was Here	Mixing	
"Criminal" (featuring Polaris)	2024	Stand Atlantic	Was Here	Mixing	
"A Work of Art" (featuring Shavo)	2024	Ice Nine Kills	TBA	Mastering, mixing	
"Awaken"	2024	Breaking Benjamin	TBA	Mastering, mixing	
"Even If It Kills Me"	2025	Papa Roach	TBA	Mastering, mixing	
"Wonderwall"	2025	Bring Me the Horizon	Spotify Singles	Mastering, mixing, additional production	
"From Me to U" (featuring Poppy)	2025	Babymetal	Metal Forth	Mixing	
"Scared"	2025	Parkway Drive	TBA	Production, mixing	
"In the Name of the Father"	2025	President	King of Terrors EP	Mixing	
"Hand That Feeds"	2025	Amy Lee & Halsey	Non-album single	Mixing	
"Fight Like a Girl" (featuring K.Flay)	2025	Evanescence	Non-album single	Mixing	
"Fearless"	2025	President	King of Terrors EP	Mixing	
"The Great Unknown"	2025	Ice Nine Kills	TBA	Mastering, mixing	
"My Queen" (featuring Spiritbox)	2025	Babymetal	Metal Forth	Production, mixing, engineering	
"Specter"	2025	Bad Omens	TBA	Mastering, mixing	
"End of You"	2025	Poppy, Amy Lee & Courtney LaPlante	Non-album single	Mastering, mixing	
"Impose"	2025	Bad Omens	TBA	Mastering, mixing	
"Dying to Love"	2025	Bad Omens	TBA	Mastering, mixing	
"Left for Good"	2025	Bad Omens	TBA	Mastering, mixing	
"Something Wicked"	2026	Breaking Benjamin	TBA	Mastering, mixing	
"Can You Feel It"	2026	Polyphia	Be Not Afraid	Mastering, mixing	
"Dehumanized"	2026	Bring Me the Horizon	Count Your Blessings | Repented	Additional production	
"Molecular Conversion"	2026	Kim Dracula	Non-album single	Mixing	
"Bad Exchanges"	2026	Showing Teeth	A Fate Worse Than Loneliness EP	Mastering, mixing	
