= Destroy Me (disambiguation) =

"Destroy Me" is a 2025 single by President.

Destroy Me may also refer to:

- "Destroy Me", a 2023 song by American musician Rebecca Black from the album Let Her Burn
- "Destroy Me", a 2025 song by American musician 2hollis from the album Star
- Destroy Me, a 2012 sequel novel to Shatter Me by Tahereh Mafi

== See also ==
- Destroy Me, Lover, a 1993 studio album by American noise rock and Industrial music band Pain Teens
- "Don't Destroy Me", a 1959 rockabilly song written by Barry Mann and Joe Sharpiro and recorded by Billy "Crash" Craddock
- Use Once and Destroy Me, a 2003 concert tour DVD by American rock band Mondo Generator
