= Angel Wings (President song) =

Single by President

from the album Blood of Your Empire
- Released: February 18, 2026
- Length: 3:52
- Label: Atlantic
- Songwriter: The President
- Producer: The President

President singles chronology
"Destroy Me" (2025)	"Angel Wings" (2026)	"Mercy" (2026)

Music video
- "Angel Wings" on YouTube

"Angel Wings" is a single by English metal band President. It was released on 18 February 2026 through Atlantic, accompanied by an official music video. The track marks the band's first new material of 2026, following the release of their EP King of Terrors in late 2025, and serves as the first single and opening track for the band's debut studio album Blood of Your Empire.

== Background ==
In an interview with Rock Sound, President's frontman revealed that "Angel Wings" was the first song written for the album and helped establish confidence and direction for the project after the more experimental, low-pressure writing process of the debut EP, starting:

The first song I wrote was "Angel Wings". It was a really important song to write because it was the first time I was writing with purpose. When I wrote the first EP, I didn't really know what it was going to be. The whole idea of the project hadn't even formed at that point so it was a no pressure situation. I was really nervous going back into the writing process again. There was such a freedom with the EP because it was written in complete secrecy. After I wrote "Angel Wings", one of my favourite songs I’ve ever written, I thought, okay, we’re in a good place.

== Composition and lyrics ==
Musically, "Angel Wings" blends alternative rock, industrial, pop and metalcore elements. Revolver described the song as moving from programmed electronic beats into heavy, djent-influenced guitars, while Rock Sound characterized its sound as a combination of synthesizers, melodic passages and heavy riffs.

Lyrically, the song deals with spiritual redemption, regret and the desire for a new beginning. The President described it as a search for "spiritual redemption and the resolve to begin again", adding that it concerns holding close those who matter while disregarding detractors

In an interview with HEAVY Magazine, The President described "Angel Wings" as the ideal introduction to Blood of Your Empire, as it combines the weight, melody, atmosphere, electronic elements and vulnerability that define the band's sound.

== Music video ==
The music video shows a mysterious figure watching the President through a keyhole as the frontman performs. Masked bandmates play in grand, empty rooms and outside imposing stone structures, while a winged figure also makes an appearance.

== Live performance ==
The band debuted "Angel Wings" live on 22 February at the Delta Center in Salt Lake City. The song was also included in the band's performance at Rockfield Studios.

== Critical reception ==
Rock Sound described the track as "[a] blend of bubbling synths, spine-tingling melodies and crushing riffs," noting that it's an even more refined offering by the band. Similarly, Roman Gonzales, writing for Knotfest, praised the track and described it as "[a] potent meld [of] alt rock structure with accents of industrial, sleek, stylized pop and metalcore dynamics."

== Personnel ==
Credits adapted from Tidal.

- The President – vocals, production
- Zakk Cervini – mixing
- Ted Jensen – mastering

== Release history ==
Region	Date	Format	Label	Ref.
Various	18 February 2026	Digital download; streaming	Atlantic	
Various	17 April 2026	Vinyl	Artist Friendly Media Co.	

== Charts ==
Chart performance for "Angel Wings"
Chart (2026)	Peak position
UK Singles Sales (OCC)	99
US Hot Hard Rock Songs (Billboard)	13
