= The Battle of Poitiers (painting) =

Painting by Eugène Delacroix

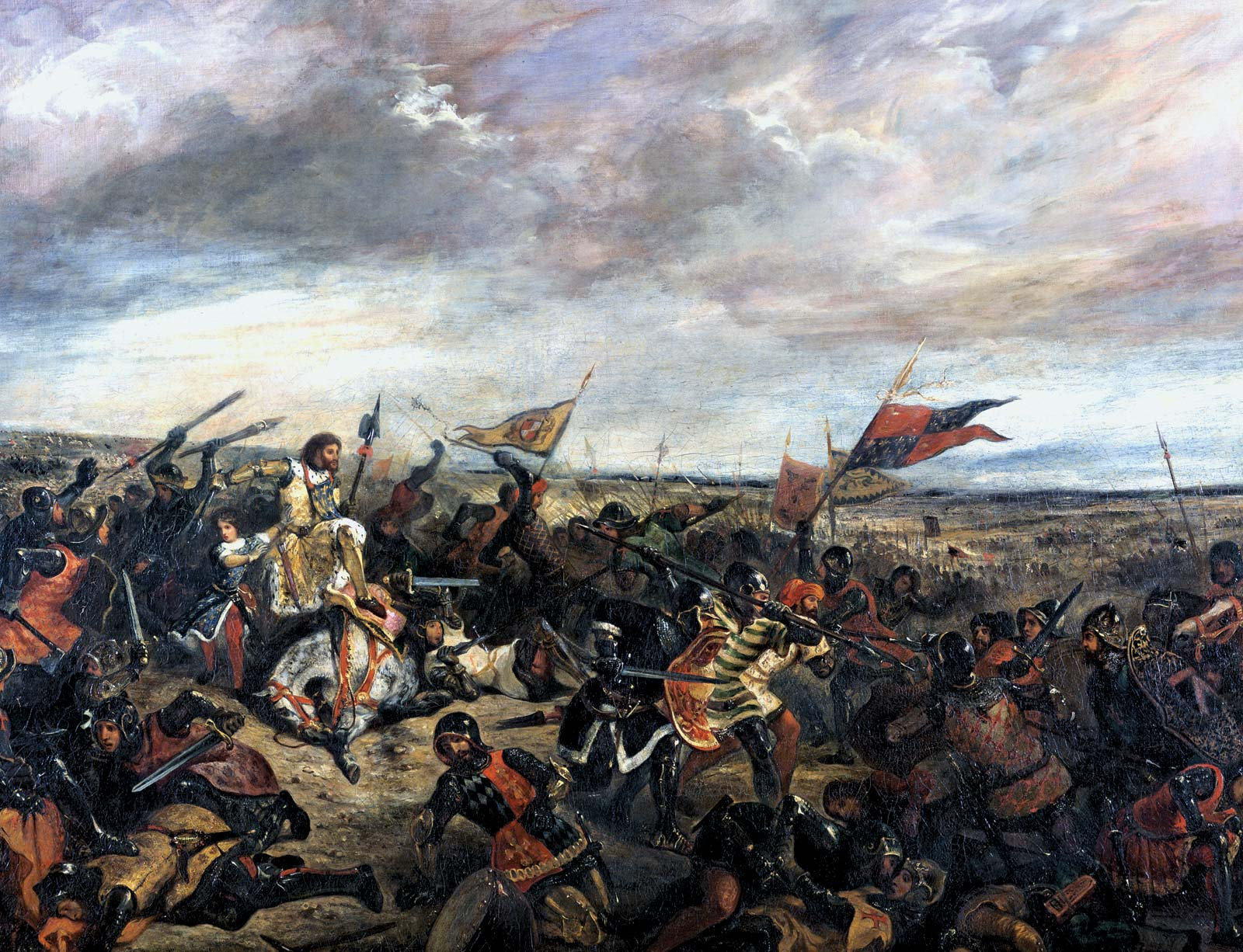
- Artist: Eugène Delacroix
- Year: 1830
- Medium: Oil on canvas
- Dimensions: 114 cm × 146 cm (45 in × 57 in)
- Location: Louvre, Paris

The Battle of Poitiers is an 1830 history painting by the French artist Eugène Delacroix. It depicts the Battle of Poitiers fought on 19 September 1356 during the Hundred Years War. The battle was decisive victory for the English forces led by Edward the Black Prince against a French army commanded by John II of France who was captured in the fighting.

The painting was commissioned in 1829 by the Duchess of Berry, the daughter-in-law of Charles X. Following the July Revolution the Duchess was forced into exile and Delacroix had to take legal measures to recover the painting. It featured in a retrospective of Delacroix's work during the Salon of 1855 at the Exposition Universelle. Today it is in the collection of the Louvre in Paris, having been acquired in 1930.

This painting is also being used as the album cover for the debut studio album "Blood Of Your Empire" by the alternative metal band PRESIDENT.

== Bibliography ==
- Allard, Sébastien & Fabre, Côme. Delacroix. Metropolitan Museum of Art, 2018.
- Johnson, Lee. The Paintings of Eugène Delacroix: A Critical Catalogue, 1816–1831, Volume 3. Clarendon Press, 1981.
