= Blood of Your Empire =

2026 studio album by President

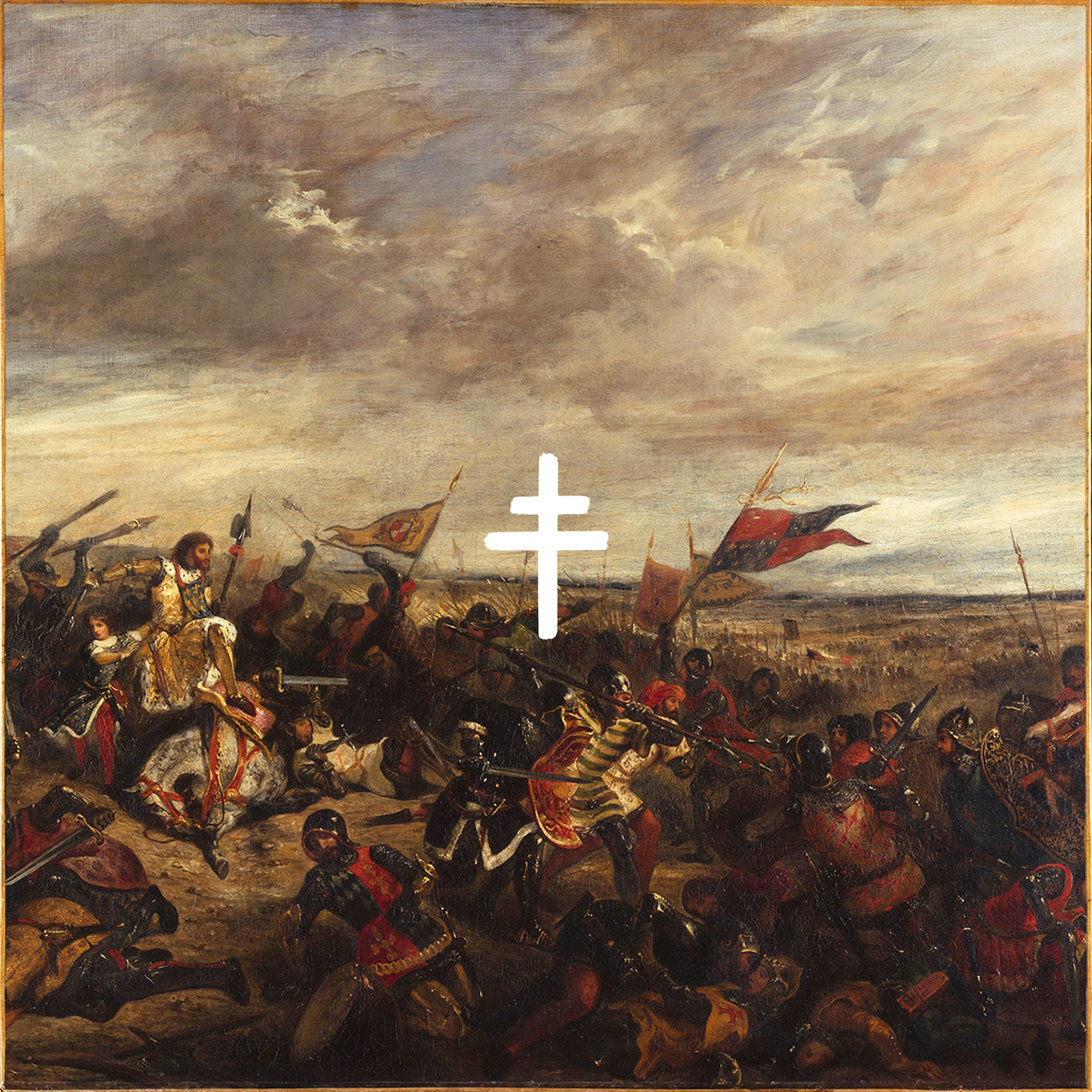
- Standard edition cover

Studio album by President
- Released: 4 September 2026
- Genre: Metalcore
- Length: 37:16
- Label: Atlantic
- Producer: The President

President chronology
King of Terrors (2025)	Blood of Your Empire (2026)

Singles from Blood of Your Empire
- 1. "Angel Wings" Released: 18 February 2026; 2. "Mercy" Released: 26 March 2026; 3. "Doom Loop" Released: 21 May 2026; 4. "Dark Heaven" Released: 30 July 2026

Blood of Your Empire is the debut studio album by English metal band President. It was released on 4 September through Atlantic. The album's ten tracks were both written and produced by the band themselves. Blood of Your Empire was supported with the release of four singles, including "Angel Wings", "Mercy", "Doom Loop", and "Dark Heaven". "Angel Wings" peaked at number 99 on the Official Charts Company's UK Singles Sales chart and number 17 on the Billboard Hot Hard Rock Songs chart, while "Doom Loop" and "Dark Heaven" peaked at number 8 and 10, respectively, on the latter.

== Background ==
In September 2025, President confirmed they had begun work on their debut studio album, which would further develop the narrative surrounding the President character. By November, The President confirmed that four songs had been written, describing the album as an evolution of King of Terrors.

"Angel Wings" was the first song completed for the album. Much of Blood of Your Empire was subsequently written and self-produced using a mobile recording setup while President toured with Architects and Bad Omens.

The album was formally announced on 21 May 2026 alongside the release of "Doom Loop", with its title, artwork and track listing unveiled at the same time.

== Musical style and themes ==
"Blood of Your Empire isn’t a criticism of God. It’s a criticism of man. A lot of the record is me trying to understand where spiritual truth ends and human corruption begins."

— The President on the central theme of Blood of Your Empire

Similar to King of Terrors, the album explores themes of existential crisis, morality and humanity's complicated relationship with religious faith. In a statement released by the band, The President described the album as stemming from his attempts to reconcile the compassion and purpose associated with religion with the suffering caused in its name.

Musically, Blood of Your Empire expands upon the band's metalcore and alternative metal foundations with a greater emphasis on electronic music, drawing influence from Four Tet, Jon Hopkins, Bicep and Hot Chip. The album combines heavy guitar-driven sections with atmospheric electronics and dance-oriented passages.

Critics also noted its stylistic variety. Blabbermouth.net described its sound as a combination of metalcore and electronica with cinematic textures, while NME highlighted elements of alternative pop, house, rap metal and electronic music. "Pink Noise", "Hate Figure" and "White Devil" further incorporate house, rap-metal and dance influences.

The album's title is referenced in the lyrics of the song "Mercy", which was originally titled "Blood of Your Empire" before being renamed to avoid revealing the album's title prematurely.

== Artwork ==
The album's artwork features the band's logo and depicts a painting of the Battle of Poitiers by the French painter Eugène Delacroix, which the band obtained permission from the Louvre to use. In any interview with Kerrang!, The President revealed that he selected the artwork for its portrayal of warfare and chaos, interpreting the king overlooking the battlefield as a symbol of humanity's abuse of religion and the recurring conflicts throughout history.

== Release and promotion ==
Prior to the album's announcement, the band released the singles "Angel Wings" and "Mercy" in February and March, respectively. Their release coincided with the group's signing with Atlantic, and the announcement of a North American headlining tour. On 17 May, the band announced the forthcoming release of "Doom Loop". The album's title, artwork and track listing were unveiled alongside the single's release on 21 May.

Blood of Your Empire was released on 4 September. President also announced headlining tours of the United Kingdom and Europe for November 2026, and Australia for February 2027.

The album was released digitally and on limited-edition vinyl and cassette variants. On 7 September, an iTunes-exclusive deluxe edition was released with ten bonus tracks recorded live at Rockfield Studios.

== Critical reception ==
Professional ratings
Review scores
Source	Rating
AllMusic	4/5 stars
Blabbermouth.net	8.5/10
Distorted Sound	4/10
Dork	2/5 stars
Kerrang!	4/5
Metal Hammer	4/5 stars
NME	3.5/5 stars
Reckless Press	8.5/10

Upon its release, Blood of Your Empire received generally positive reviews from critics. AllMusic awarded the album 4/5 stars, praising its blend of heavy music with electronic, pop and R&B elements. Blabbermouth.net gave it 8.5/10, highlighting its combination of metalcore, electronica and cinematic atmosphere. Kerrang! awarded it 4/5, praising its heavy guitars, electronics and ambition.

Metal Hammer also awarded the album 4/5, praising its personal themes, modern metal influences and songwriting. Reckless Press gave the album 8.5/10, concluding that it gave listeners "a reason to stick around."

NME gave the album 3.5/5 stars, describing it as ambitious and eclectic but occasionally uneven. Distorted Sound was more negative, rating it 4/10 and criticizing its songwriting and lack of a distinct identity, with Dork echoing that sentiment.

== Track listing ==
All tracks are written by The President unless otherwise noted.

Standard edition
No.	Title	Writer(s)	Length
1.	"Angel Wings"		3:52
2.	"Doom Loop"		4:00
3.	"Dark Heaven"	The President, Vice	3:32
4.	"Pink Noise"	The President, Vice	4:04
5.	"Mercy"		3:49
6.	"Sleepwalker"	The President, Vice	3:48
7.	"Dionysus"		2:58
8.	"This Will Divide Us"		4:03
9.	"Hate Figure" (featuring Ando San)		2:48
10.	"White Devil"		4:23
Total length:			37:16

iTunes deluxe edition bonus tracks
No.	Title	Length
11.	"Fearless" (live from Rockfield Studios)	3:34
12.	"Dionysus" (live from Rockfield Studios)	2:59
13.	"Mercy" (live from Rockfield Studios)	3:53
14.	"Angel Wings" (live from Rockfield Studios)	3:48
15.	"Doom Loop" (live from Rockfield Studios)	4:00
16.	"Conclave" (live from Rockfield Studios)	4:27
17.	"Destroy Me" (live from Rockfield Studios)	2:44
18.	"White Devil" (live from Rockfield Studios)	4:20
19.	"Dark Heaven" (live from Rockfield Studios)	3:25
20.	"In the Name of the Father" (live from Rockfield Studios)	3:47

Notes

- Track listing adapted from Deezer.
- Deluxe edition track listing adapted from iTunes.
- "Doom Loop" is stylised in all caps.
- "Dark Heaven" is stylised in all lowercase.
- "Dionysus" is a re-recorded version of a track that appeared on King of Terrors.
- "Hate Figure" features Ando San, who has opened for President in the past, and is signed to the same management company, Future History.

== Charts ==
Chart performance for Blood of Your Empire
Chart (2026)	Peak position
Australian Albums (ARIA)	9
Austrian Albums (Ö3 Austria)	18
Belgian Albums (Ultratop Flanders)	21
Belgian Albums (Ultratop Wallonia)	41
Danish Vinyl Albums (Hitlisten)	12
Dutch Albums (Album Top 100)	76
French Albums (SNEP)	172
French Rock & Metal Albums (SNEP)	13
German Albums (Offizielle Top 100)	45
German Rock & Metal Albums (Offizielle Top 100)	12
Hungarian Albums (MAHASZ)	9
Hungarian Vinyl Albums (MAHASZ)	4
New Zealand Albums (RMNZ)	30
Portuguese Albums (AFP)	195
Scottish Albums (Official Charts)	4
Swiss Albums (Schweizer Hitparade)	74
UK Albums (Official Charts)	5
UK Rock & Metal Albums (Official Charts)	1
US Billboard 200	67
US Top Rock & Alternative Albums (Billboard)	18
