= Sleepwalker (President song) =

Song by President

from the album Blood of Your Empire
- Released: September 4, 2026
- Length: 3:48
- Label: Atlantic
- Songwriters: The President; Vice
- Producer: The President

"Sleepwalker" is a song by English metal band President. Written by The President and Vice, it was released on 4 September 2026 as part of the band's debut studio album, Blood of Your Empire. Despite not being released as a single, the song charted in the United States and New Zealand.

== Composition and lyrics ==
In a special-edition zine published by Revolver to coincide with the release of Blood of Your Empire, The President described "Sleepwalker" as reflecting feelings of self-loathing, isolation and concern that his destructive behaviour could burden those closest to him. He also said the song was influenced by the idea of disregarding the opinions of strangers and placing greater value on those of loved ones.

Musically, "Sleepwalker" combines alternative rock and electronic elements, beginning with synths and a spoken-word sample before developing into heavier drums, guitars and a melodic chorus. The vocals shift between restrained and more forceful delivery as the song progresses.

== Critical reception ==
In reviews of Blood of Your Empire, "Sleepwalker" received mixed commentary from critics. Metal Hammer described the song as a lighter-waving moment on the album, while NME noted its exploration of low self-esteem but felt that its emotional impact was diminished by the inclusion of a spoken-word sample.

== Personnel ==
Credits adapted from Tidal.

- The President – vocals, writing, production
- Vice – drums, writing
- Zakk Cervini – mixing
- Julian Gargiulo – mixing assistance
- Ste Kerry – mastering

== Charts ==
Chart performance for "Sleepwalker"
Chart (2026)	Peak position
New Zealand Hot Singles (RMNZ	40
US Hot Hard Rock Songs (Billboard)	2
US Mainstream Rock Airplay (Billboard)	39
