= Doom Loop (song) =

Single by President

from the album Blood of Your Empire
- Released: 21 May 2026
- Length: 4:01
- Label: Atlantic
- Songwriter: The President
- Producer: The President

President singles chronology
| "Mercy" (2026) | "Doom Loop" (2026) | "Dark Heaven" (2026) |

Music video
- "Doom Loop" on YouTube

"Doom Loop" (stylized in all caps) is a single by the anonymous, masked English metal band President. It was announced as a single on 17 May 2026, and released on 21 May through Atlantic alongside a music video.

"Doom Loop" serves as the third single from the band's debut studio album Blood of Your Empire.

== Background ==
In a special-edition zine published by Revolver to coincide with the release of Blood of Your Empire, The President revealed that "Doom Loop" was written entirely in a single day, with its chorus left unchanged from the first version he sang. He described the track as having a "cyberpunk" feel and as one of the album's most hopeless songs, centered on existential despair and the idea that life may have no inherent meaning.

== Composition and lyrics ==
Musically, "Doom Loop" incorporates alternative metal with prominent electronic elements. Metal Hammer described the track as pushing further into the band's electronic side, built around pulsing synth bass and pop-oriented vocals before introducing heavier guitar riffs and an alternative metal breakdown. Reviewing Blood of Your Empire, Kerrang! similarly highlighted the song's hypnotic rhythms and interplay between propulsive synthesizers and stabbing guitars, while Metal Hammer later characterized it as one of the album's more danceable tracks.

Lyrically, the song centers on the passage of time, mortality and the tendency to appreciate moments only after they have passed. The President described its theme as the "strange tragedy of time", explaining that people spend their lives chasing, wasting and fearing it, only recognizing its value once a moment has become a memory.

== Music video ==
The accompanying music has been described as "dark and cinematic".

== Live performance ==
President debuted "Doom Loop" live on 24 May during their second performance at the Slam Dunk Festival. The song was also included in the band's performance at Rockfield Studios.

== Critical reception ==
Rock Sound described the track as both "pulsating" and "neon-drenched buzz that builds in tension and tenacity," and praised it for "showcasing a control over beats as much as battery," while Loudwire described it as a "steadily driving electro-rock jam" and praised it for being "headier" than its predecessors.

== Personnel ==
Credits adapted from Tidal.

- The President – vocals, production
- Vice – programming, drums
- Zakk Cervini – mixing
- Ted Jensen – mastering
- Carl Bown – programming

== Release history ==
| Region | Date | Format | Label | Ref. |
|---|---|---|---|---|
| Various | 21 May 2026 | Digital download; streaming | Atlantic | |

== Charts ==
Chart performance for "Doom Loop"
| Chart (2026) | Peak position |
|---|---|
| US Hot Hard Rock Songs (Billboard) | 8 |

== Honors ==
- "Doom Loop" was nominated for "Song of The Year" by MoreCore Music Awards.
