= Dark Heaven (song) =

Single by President

from the album Blood of Your Empire
- Released: 30 July 2026
- Length: 3:32
- Label: Atlantic
- Songwriters: The President, Vice
- Producer: The President

President singles chronology
"Doom Loop" (2026)	"Dark Heaven" (2026)

Music video
- "Dark Heaven" on YouTube

"Dark Heaven" (stylised in all lowercase) is a single by the anonymous, masked English metal band President. It was announced as a single on 23 July 2026, and released on 30 July through Atlantic.

"Dark Heaven" is the fourth single from the band's debut studio album Blood of Your Empire.

== Composition and lyrics ==
Musically, "Dark Heaven" combines distorted verses with melodic hooks and a heavier chorus than its predecessors. Gregory Adams of Revolver felt the track further expands President's melodic take on modern metal, combining hard-hitting, juddering guitars with atmospheric synths and abrasive production effects.

Lyrically, the song addresses themes of faith, identity, and uncertainty, which recur throughout the band's debut album. The band described the song in a statement:

"dark heaven" is a reflection on the contradictions of faith, and how something intended to unite humanity has so often been used to justify division, violence, and power. It's about the way greed can wear the mask of righteousness. It isn't an attack on belief itself; it's about searching for something real beneath the noise, and asking what remains when certainty begins to crumble.

== Music video ==
Rather than featuring a conventional band performance, the music video follows a select group invited to attend "an exclusive briefing in Los Angeles," capturing their reactions as they hear the song for the first time inside the historic Lincoln Avenue Methodist Church located at the Heritage Square Museum.

== Live performance ==
President debuted "Dark Heaven" live on 4 September, during the opening night of their first North American headlining tour in Nashville, Tennessee. The song was also included in the band's performance at Rockfield Studios.

== Critical reception ==
Both Revolver and Rock Sound praised the song, with the latter describing it as "stunning", "emotional and anthemic," yet "crushing and cathartic." Similarly, Ramon Gonzales of Knotfest felt that the song "more than delivers on the hype."

== Personnel ==
Credits adapted from Tidal.

- The President – vocals, production
- Vice – programming, drums
- Heist – guitar
- Zakk Cervini – mixing
- Ted Jensen – mastering

== Release history ==
Region	Date	Format	Label	Ref.
Various	30 July 2026	Digital download; streaming	Atlantic	

== Charts ==
Chart performance for "Dark Heaven"
Chart (2026)	Peak position
US Hot Hard Rock Songs (Billboard)	10
