= Mercy (President song) =

Single by President

from the album Blood of Your Empire
- Released: March 26, 2026
- Length: 3:49
- Label: Atlantic
- Songwriter: The President
- Producer: The President

President singles chronology
"Angel Wings" (2026)	"Mercy" (2026)	"Doom Loop" (2026)

Visualizer
- "Mercy" on YouTube

"Mercy" is a single by the anonymous, masked English metal band President. It was released on 26 March 2026 through Atlantic and serves as the second single from the band's debut studio album Blood of Your Empire.

The track marks the band's second single of 2026, following the release of "Angel Wings" in mid-February.

== Background ==
In an interview with Rock Sound, President's frontman revealed that "Mercy" was written as a more straightforward, energetic live track and became a thematic cornerstone of the album, with its lyrics inspiring the title "Blood of Your Empire":

I wanted a song on there that was more straight down the line and it's so fun to play live. We’re starting to get circle pits in that song. It's not even that heavy, but it's the crowd just running in circles. That was the second song I wrote and I knew when I wrote that lyric that it was what the album was going to be called straight away. The song was originally called "Blood [o]f Your Empire" but I knew it was going to come out before the album's out so I switched it. I didn't want to give away the album name yet. But that's a real cornerstone of the record, thematically.

== Composition and lyrics ==
According to the band, the song is a reflection on how religion has historically caused division and suffering, and a personal attempt to understand its human impact, stating:

Throughout history, religion has been tied to profound division and loss. This song is a reflection on that reality, and a way for me to come to terms with what it means on a human level.

== Live performance ==
President debuted "Mercy" live on 4 April as they headlined the TakeDown Festival 2026 at Portsmouth Guildhall. Prior to the release of Blood of Your Empire, the live version of the song would be preceded by a pre-recorded monologue based on Plato's allegory of the cave. The song was also included in the band's performance at Rockfield Studios.

== Critical reception ==
NME described the single as both "relentless" and "huge," while Revolver praised its layered, arpeggiated synth textures and Deftones-influenced groove. Similarly, Rock Sound called the single "massive" in both scope and sound.

== Personnel ==
Credits adapted from Tidal.

- The President – vocals, songwriting, production
- Vice – drums
- Zakk Cervini – mixing, mastering

== Release history ==
Region	Date	Format	Label	Ref.
Various	26 March 2026	Digital download; streaming	Atlantic	

== Charts ==
Chart performance for "Mercy"
Chart (2026)	Peak position
US Hot Hard Rock Songs (Billboard)	17
