= Dionysus (President song) =

Song by President

from the album Blood of Your Empire
- Released: September 26, 2025
- Length: 3:02 (EP); 2:58 (album)
- Label: King of Terrors / ADA; Atlantic
- Songwriter: The President
- Producer: The President

Visualizer
- "Dionysus" on YouTube

"Dionysus" is a song by English metal band President. It was originally released on the band's EP King of Terrors before being re-recorded for their debut studio album, Blood of Your Empire. Despite not being released as a single, the song charted in the United States.

== Composition and lyrics ==
In an interview with Kerrang!, "Dionysus" was revealed to have been named after the Greek god of wine and ecstasy, with its lyrics centring on an appeal to a higher power for guidance or communication.

Musically, Metal Hammer described the song as continuing the modern metalcore approach heard throughout King of Terrors, highlighting its shifts between heavy drops and expansive melodic choruses.

== Versions ==
Two studio versions of "Dionysus" have been released. The original version appeared on President's debut EP, King of Terrors, released on 26 September 2025. The song was later re-recorded for the band's debut studio album, Blood of Your Empire, released on 4 September 2026. The album version features revised production and a heavier arrangement, with greater emphasis on the guitars and vocals.

In a special-edition zine published by Revolver to coincide with the release of Blood of Your Empire, The President revealed that "Dionysus" was among the first tracks recorded for King of Terrors. He initially performed the drums himself before the song was later re-recorded with Vice on drums.

A live version of the song, recorded during the band's performance at Rockfield Studios, was included on the iTunes-exclusive deluxe edition of Blood of Your Empire.

== Live performances ==
"Dionysus" was performed during President's live debut at Download Festival in 2025. The song was also included in the band's performance at Rockfield Studios.

== Critical reception ==
"Dionysus" received generally positive reviews from music critics. Kerrang! described it as arguably the heaviest track on King of Terrors, highlighting the contrast between its aggressive riffs and cathartic choruses and describing its breakdown as unexpectedly uplifting. Writing for Metal Hammer, Dannii Leivers grouped "Dionysus" with "Destroy Me" as examples of President's modern metalcore style, praising the band's use of dynamics and melody.

== Personnel ==
Credits adapted from Tidal.

- The President – vocals, production
- Protest – bass
- Vice – drums
- Zakk Cervini – mixing
- Ted Jensen – mastering

== Charts ==
Chart performance for "Dionysus"
Chart (2026)	Peak position
US Hot Hard Rock Songs (Billboard)	19
