= Pink Noise (President song) =

Song by President

from the album Blood of Your Empire
- Released: September 4, 2026
- Length: 4:04
- Label: Atlantic
- Songwriters: The President; Vice
- Producer: The President

"Pink Noise" is a song by English metal band President. Written by The President and Vice, it was released on 4 September 2026 as part of the band's debut studio album, Blood of Your Empire. Despite not being released as a single, the song charted in the United States.

== Composition and lyrics ==
In a special-edition zine published by Revolver to coincide with the release of Blood of Your Empire, The President described "Pink Noise" as a reaction to material he had encountered online. Written partly while touring with Bad Omens and Architects, it was the first song he had written on tour. He said its contrasting sound reflects an attempt to block out persistent thoughts and outside noise before returning to more existential themes, describing the track as "more like a diary than anything else."

Musically, "Pink Noise" blends electronic pop and metalcore, shifting between atmospheric passages and heavier guitar-driven sections. NME highlighted its rapid stylistic changes, including a brief house-influenced passage, while Metal Hammer noted the song's use of a spoken sample referencing Plato's allegory of the cave.

== Live performance ==
"Pink Noise" made its live debut on 5 November 2026, during President's performance at the Kulturbrauerei in Berlin, Germany, as part of the band's UK and European tour.

== Critical reception ==
In reviews of Blood of Your Empire, "Pink Noise" received mixed-to-positive commentary from critics. NME highlighted the track as an example of President moving beyond their established metalcore sound, praising its shifts between alternative pop, metalcore and house music. Sêan Reid of Already Heard similarly called it an album standout, praising its guitars, drums and genre-shifting house section. By contrast, Distorted Sound criticized the transition from its drum-and-bass-influenced passages into the chorus, describing the latter as one of the album's weaker moments.

== Personnel ==
Credits adapted from Tidal.

- The President – vocals, writing, production
- Vice – drums, writing
- Zakk Cervini – mixing
- Julian Gargiulo – mixing assistance
- Ted Jensen – mastering

== Charts ==
Chart performance for "Pink Noise"
Chart (2026)	Peak position
US Hot Hard Rock Songs (Billboard)	15
