= Rage (song) =

2025 single by President

Single by President

from the album King of Terrors
- Released: July 18, 2025
- Length: 4:08
- Label: King of Terrors / ADA
- Songwriter: The President
- Producer: The President

President singles chronology
"Fearless" (2025)	"Rage" (2025)	"Destroy Me" (2025)

Music video
- "Rage" on YouTube

"Rage" (stylised as "RAGE") is the third single by the anonymous English metal band President. It premiered via a teaser in early July and was officially released on 18 July 2025 alongside a music video.

== Background and release ==
President announced plans for their debut EP, King of Terrors, scheduled for release on 26 September 2025. "Rage" was unveiled as its lead single, with a teaser shared on 4 July and the full track and video dropping on 18 July.

== Composition and lyrics ==
"Rage" explores a more synth-heavy, electronic-driven sound compared to President's earlier guitar-based singles. Its lyrical content is inspired by Dylan Thomas’s poem "Do not go gentle into that good night."

== Music video ==
The official music video was released alongside the single on 18 July. The video is set in a cathedral and features a stylized "dance-fight" between two dancers while the masked vocalist observes from a balcony above.

== Live performance ==
"Rage" was among the songs performed during President's live debut at Download Festival 2025.

== Critical reception ==
Metal Hammer described it as "a genuinely tender and beautiful moment," noting its synth-driven, electronic style.

== Charts ==
Chart performance for "Rage"
Chart (2025)	Peak position
UK Singles Downloads (OCC)	93
UK Singles Sales (OCC)	98
UK Rock & Metal (OCC)	32

== Release history ==
Region	Date	Format	Label
Worldwide	18 July 2025	Digital download, streaming	King of Terrors / ADA
