= Hated (song) =

Single by Beartooth

from the album Aggressive
- B-side: "Sick of Me"
- Released: May 20, 2016
- Genre: Hardcore punk; metalcore; melodic hardcore
- Length: 3:31
- Label: Red Bull; UNFD
- Songwriter: Caleb Shomo
- Producer: Shomo

Beartooth singles chronology
"Loser" (2016)	"Hated" (2016)	"Sick of Me" (2017)

Music video
- "Hated" on YouTube

"Hated" is a song by American rock band Beartooth. It was released on May 20, 2016, as the fourth single from their second studio album, Aggressive. The song peaked at number 36 on the US Hot Rock & Alternative Songs chart and appeared on the 2017 Billboard Mainstream Rock Airplay year-end chart at number 28. The song was certified Gold by the Recording Industry Association of America in March 2025.

== Background ==
"Hated" premiered via Revolver for streaming on May 19, 2016, before it was released for digital download the following day as the second single from Aggressive. Speaking about the song's meaning, Caleb Shomo stated, "This song is about individuality and how so many people are so insecure that they just attack you for being yourself, even to the point of ignorance."

Acoustic rock duo This Wild Life released a cover of the song on February 17, 2017, via Facebook.

== Composition ==
"Hated" was written and produced by Caleb Shomo. The lyrical content of the song speaks about "self-deprecating indictments." Musically, the track is described as hardcore punk and metalcore, predominantly featuring clean vocals from Shomo.

== Critical reception ==
Bradley Zorgdrager of Exclaim! stated, "For these teeth, apparently the hate is being directed at them for their slick metalcore, which walks the tightrope between aggression and pop punk better than any band since A Day to Remember. The song's breakdown shows the former side, with an off-kilter breakdown not far off from Stray from the Path." Fall Out Boy's Joe Trohman called the track a "solid tune."

== Chart performance ==
"Hated" debuted on the US Billboard Mainstream Rock chart at number 38 on the week of September 24, 2016. The song later peaked at number six in April 2017, becoming the group's first top ten on the chart. The song also peaked at number 36 on the US Hot Rock & Alternative Songs chart.

== Music video ==
The music video for "Hated" premiered on July 11, 2016, and was directed by Jeb Hardwick. In the video, the group is performing the song in a room full of triangular windows on the walls and ceiling with glowing lines on the side.

== Track listing ==
Digital download
No.	Title	Length
1.	"Hated"	3:31

7" Acoustic – Hated/Sick of Me
No.	Title	Length
1.	"Hated" (acoustic)	2:51
2.	"Sick of Me" (acoustic)	3:07

== Personnel ==
Credits for "Hated" adapted from album's liner notes.

- Caleb Shomo – vocals, all instruments, producer, engineer
- David Bendeth – mixing

== Charts ==
=== Weekly charts ===
Weekly chart performance for "Hated"
Chart (2016–17)	Peak position
Germany Alternative (Deutsche Alternative Charts)	1
US Hot Rock & Alternative Songs (Billboard)	36

=== Year-end charts ===
Year-end chart performance for "Hated"
Chart (2017)	Position
US Mainstream Rock (Billboard)	28

== Certifications ==
Region	Certification	Certified units/sales
United States (RIAA)	Gold	500,000^{‡}
^{‡} Sales+streaming figures based on certification alone.

== Release history ==
Release history for "Hated"
Region	Date	Format	Label	Ref.
Various	May 20, 2016	Digital download	Red Bull; UNFD	
United States	May 26, 2017	Vinyl	Red Bull	
