= Destroy Me =

2025 single by President

Single by President

from the album King of Terrors
- Released: September 4, 2025
- Length: 2:42
- Label: King of Terrors / ADA
- Songwriters: The President; Vice
- Producer: The President

President singles chronology
"Rage" (2025)	"Destroy Me" (2025)	"Angel Wings" (2026)

Music video
- "Destroy Me" on YouTube

"Destroy Me" is the fourth single by the anonymous, masked English metal band President. It was released on 4 September 2025, accompanied by a music video.

== Composition and lyrics ==
"Destroy Me" combines elements of emo rap, post-hardcore and electronic metal. Rock Sound highlighted its emo-rap-influenced verses and post-hardcore breakdown, while Metal Hammer noted its blend of electronica, alternative metal and anthemic hooks.

Lyrically, the song centers on emotional collapse and the desire to escape a destructive situation. The President described it as reflecting his "lowest ebb" and wanting to find a way out.

== Music video ==
The official music video premiered alongside the single on 4 September 2025. The music video takes place in an empty venue where the band performs alongside flashing neon lights and lyrics on the screen.

== Live performance ==
"Destroy Me" was part of President's live debut set at Download Festival on 15 June 2025. Rock Sound has described it as a fan-favorite. The song was also included in the band's performance at Rockfield Studios.

== Critical reception ==
"Destroy Me" received generally positive commentary from music critics. Metal Hammer highlighted its combination of electronica, tech metal and alternative metal choruses, describing the mixture as "potent". In its review of King of Terrors, the magazine also praised the song's shifts between heavy drops and large choruses, citing it as evidence of the band's sense of dynamics and melody. Already Heard similarly regarded the track as one of the EP's stronger singles, praising Vice's drumming and Heist's guitar work.

In a live review, NME called "Destroy Me" the highlight of President's London headline show, particularly noting The President's vocal performance.

== Release history ==
Region	Date	Format	Label
Worldwide	4 September 2025	Digital download, streaming	King of Terrors / ADA

== Charts ==
Chart performance for "Destroy Me"
Chart (2025–2026)	Peak position
UK Indie Breakers (Official Charts)	17
UK Rock & Metal (Official Charts)	31
UK Singles Sales (Official Charts)	95
US Rock & Alternative Airplay (Billboard)	48
