= In the Name of the Father (song) =

2025 single by President

Single by President

from the EP King of Terrors
- Written: December 2023
- Released: May 15, 2025
- Genre: Alternative metal
- Length: 3:47
- Label: King of Terrors / ADA
- Songwriter: The President
- Producer: The President

President singles chronology
"In the Name of the Father" (2025)	"Fearless" (2025)

Music video
- "In the Name of the Father" on YouTube

"In the Name of the Father" is the debut single by the anonymous, masked English metal band President. It was released on 15 May 2025 and serves as the opening track for the EP King of Terrors. In a statement accompanying the release, the band called the track their "first proclamation" and described it as "the first crack in the surface" of the project.

== Composition and lyrics ==
"In The Name of the Father" was the first song written by The President sometime around Christmas 2023, before the project's masked presentation and wider concept had been fully developed.

The song combines metalcore with electronic and atmospheric elements. Metal Hammer described the track as pairing a prominent metalcore riff with "waves of swirling electronica", while Kerrang! noted its baroque-influenced opening.

Lyrically, the song explores religious doubt, fear and the search for meaning. The President said it reflected "where I was and what I was going through" while questioning his faith, and later explained that the song's references to fear and worship concern the way religion can be introduced through the threat of punishment.

== Live performance ==
The band performed "In the Name of the Father" during their live debut at Download Festival on 15 June 2025. Following the set, President’s frontman spoke about the experience, stating:

They were singing "In The Name of The Father" like they’d known it for 20 years. I started crying when I came off-stage. It fucking broke me! I’d written that song before I’d really figured out how this was all going to fit together and play out. It was a note to myself, where I was and what I was going through.

The song was also included in the band's performance at Rockfield Studios.

== Track listing ==
Digital single
No.	Title	Length
1.	"In the Name of the Father"	3:47

12" Vinyl
No.	Title	Length
1.	"In the Name of the Father"	3:47
2.	"Fearless"	3:35
Total length:		7:22

== Critical reception ==
Metal Hammer's Dannii Leivers described "In the Name of the Father" as "a thrilling slab of metalcore", praising its "lofty chorus" and heavy breakdown, while noting the prominent use of Auto-Tune on President's vocals. Kerrang! highlighted the song's baroque opening synthesizers and its role in establishing the EP's recurring spiritual themes, describing the band's music more broadly as a blend of metal, post-hardcore, R&B and electronic influences.

== Personnel ==
Credits adapted from Tidal.

- The President – production, composition
- Zakk Cervini – mixing
- Ted Jensen – mastering

== Release history ==
Region	Date	Format	Label	Ref.
Various	15 May 2025	Digital download; streaming	Kings of Terrors / ADA	
Various	25 July 2025	Vinyl	Kings of Terrors / ADA	

== Charts ==
Chart performance for "In The Name of The Father"
Chart (2025)	Peak position
UK Singles Downloads (OCC)	50
UK Singles Sales (OCC)	52
UK Indie (OCC)	41
UK Rock & Metal (OCC)	19
US Hot Hard Rock Songs (Billboard)	14
