= Sick of Me (Beartooth song) =

Single by Beartooth

from the album Aggressive
- A-side: "Hated"
- Released: May 2, 2017
- Genre: Alternative rock
- Length: 3:15
- Label: Red Bull; UNFD
- Songwriters: Caleb Shomo; John Feldmann
- Producer: Shomo

Beartooth singles chronology
"Hated" (2016)	"Sick of Me" (2017)	"Bad Listener" (2018)

Music video
- "Sick of Me" on YouTube

"Sick of Me" is a song by American rock band Beartooth. It was serviced to rock radio on May 2, 2017, as the fifth and final single from their second studio album, Aggressive. The song peaked at number 48 on the US Rock Airplay chart and reached number one on the German Alternative Singles chart.

== Background and composition ==
"Sick of Me" is song about overcoming anxiety and depression. Along with the release of the song, the group released a new line of t-shirts of the song to raise awareness for depression and anxiety, with proceeds going to the National Alliance on Mental Illness. The track was written by Caleb Shomo and John Feldmann, while production was handled by Shomo.

== Live performances ==
"Sick of Me" was performed live routinely during the Aggressive Tour as the fifth song from the setlist. The group also performed the track during the American Nightmare Tour in 2017, supporting Bring Me the Horizon. They also performed the song live for the first time in their hometown of Columbus, Ohio, on July 12, 2017. A live version of the song appeared on the deluxe edition of Aggressive.

== Music video ==
The music video for "Sick of Me" was released on May 25, 2017, and was directed by Marc Klasfeld. The video shines a light on the topic of depression, featuring three individuals opening up about their struggles with the mood disorder. Klesfeld hoped that the video could "help anyone afflicted with depression in some way." The first person to share their story is a former Marine, Ernesto, who after his wife left him while on deployment, fell into depression and almost took his own life. He battled through his depression and walked 22,000 miles from Clarksville, Tennessee to Los Angeles, to raise awareness for the staggering 22 veterans that kill themselves in the United States every single day. The second person to share their story is Katie, who after moving to Los Angeles, was in the middle of family and financial problems, and with no friends able to help, fell into depression. However, she turned to wall and rock climbing to overcome her struggles with the disorder. The third and final person to share their story is Portia, who felt lost in her life and going through depression. However, she found escapism in cosplaying and has since found a supportive community for her life and hobby.

In the music video, Shomo shared his own experience stating,

"Depression and anxiety isn't something you just get away from. It's just inside you. For me it's just always in my brain churning. It's about fighting it and overcoming it, you can't run away from it. You have to deal with it. This song is a big way to help. At least for me, music has been implanted in my body and what I've connected with. When I go on stage everything goes away. If you can choose that you will not let depression and anxiety run your life, you're going to make it. It's your body and your life and your choice."

== Track listing ==
CD single
No.	Title	Length
1.	"Sick of Me"	3:16

7" Acoustic – Hated/Sick of Me
No.	Title	Length
1.	"Hated" (acoustic)	2:51
2.	"Sick of Me" (acoustic)	3:07

== Personnel ==
Credits for "Sick of Me" adapted from album's liner notes.

- Caleb Shomo – vocals, all instruments, producer, engineer
- John Feldmann – producer
- Zakk Cervini – engineer

== Charts ==
Chart performance for "Sick of Me"
Chart (2017)	Peak position
Germany Alternative (Deutsche Alternative Charts)	4
US Rock & Alternative Airplay (Billboard)	48

== Release history ==
Release history for "Sick of Me"
Region	Date	Format	Label	Ref.
United States	May 2, 2017	Rock radio	Red Bull; UNFD	
United States	May 26, 2017	Vinyl	Red Bull	
United Kingdom	July 28, 2017	CD	Red Bull; UNFD	
