= Remember That You Will Die =

Studio album by Polyphia
- Released: 28 October 2022
- Length: 39:01
- Label: Rise

Polyphia chronology
New Levels New Devils (2018)	Remember That You Will Die (2022)	Be Not Afraid (2026)

Singles from Remember That You Will Die
- 1. "Playing God" Released: 2022; 2. "Neurotica" Released: 2022; 3. "ABC" Released: 2022; 4. "Ego Death" Released: 2022; 5. "Chimera (feat. Lil West)" Released: 2022

Professional ratings
Review scores
Source	Rating
AllMusic	3.5/5 stars
Sputnikmusic	3.7/5

Remember That You Will Die is the fourth studio album by American rock band Polyphia, released on October 28, 2022, by Rise Records. It debuted at number 33 on the Billboard 200 chart and number one on the Top Hard Rock Albums chart. It was ranked as the best guitar album of 2022 by Guitar World readers, who also ranked the solo by Steve Vai on "Ego Death" as the best guitar solo of 2022.

== Track listing ==
Remember That You Will Die track listing
No.	Title	Writer(s)	Producer(s)	Length
1.	"Genesis" (featuring Brasstracks)	Tim Henson; Scott LePage; Clay Gober; Clay Aeschliman; lophiile; Ivan Jackson; Paul Judge; Luke Holland; Brady Watt; Rodney Jerkins; Rafa Rodríguez	Henson; LePage; Judge	3:14
2.	"Playing God"	Henson; LePage; Gober; Aeschliman; Nick Sampson; Judge; Ari Starace; Heavy Mellow; Johan Lenox; Wes Hauch; Jakob Sweet; NOTRUST	Henson; LePage; Judge; Lenox; Starace; NOTRUST	3:25
3.	"The Audacity" (featuring Anomalie)	Henson; LePage; Gober; Aeschliman; Anomalie	Henson; LePage; Anomalie	2:24
4.	"Reverie"	Henson; LePage; Gober; Aeschliman; Judge; Starace; Nick Sampson; Rodríguez	Henson; LePage; Starace	4:02
5.	"ABC" (featuring Sophia Black)	LePage; Henson; Starace	Henson; LePage; Gober; Aeschliman; Starace; Sophia Black; Suyuki	2:32
6.	"Memento Mori" (featuring Killstation)	Henson; LePage; Gober; Aeschliman; Judge; Holland; Lenox; Killstation	Henson; LePage; Judge; Lenox	2:44
7.	"Fuck Around and Find Out" (featuring Snot)	Henson; LePage; Gober; Aeschliman; Judge; Lenox; Holland; Snot; Rio Leyva	Henson; LePage; Judge; Leyva; Lenox	2:31
8.	"All Falls Apart"	Henson; LePage; Jackson	Henson; Jackson	1:19
9.	"Neurotica"	Henson; LePage; Gober; Aeschliman; Holland; Watt; Sims Cashion	Henson; Cashion; LePage	3:14
10.	"Chimera" (featuring Lil West)	Henson; LePage; Gober; Aeschliman; Starace; Judge; Lenox; Holland; Lil West	Henson; LePage; Judge	3:56
11.	"Bloodbath" (featuring Chino Moreno)	Henson; LePage; Gober; Aeschliman; Judge; Chino Moreno; Lil Aaron	Henson; LePage; Judge	3:50
12.	"Ego Death" (featuring Steve Vai)	Henson; LePage	Henson; LePage; Gober; Aeschliman; Jackson	5:50
Total length:				39:01

== Personnel ==
Polyphia

- Tim Henson – guitar
- Scott LePage – guitar
- Clay Gober – bass guitar
- Clay Aeschliman – drums

Featured musicians

- Brasstracks – trumpet (1, 8, 12)
- Anomalie – keyboards and synths (3)
- Sophia Black – vocals (5)
- Killstation – vocals (6)
- Snot – vocals (7)
- Lil West – vocals (10)
- Chino Moreno – vocals (11)
- Steve Vai – guitar (12)

Additional musicians

- Rafa Rodriguez – additional guitar (4), saxophone (1)
- Brady Watt – additional bass (1)
- Luke Holland – additional drums (1, 6, 9, 10)

Technical

- Zakk Cervini – mixing
- Nik Trekov – mixing assistant
- Nick Sampson – drum engineering (1, 2, 3, 4, 6, 7, 10, 11)
- Sean Kellett – drum engineering (1, 6, 7, 9, 10)
- Bryce Butler – drum engineering (5)
- Chris Athens – mastering

== Charts ==
Chart performance for Remember That You Will Die
Chart (2022)	Peak position
Australian Albums (ARIA)	72
Canadian Albums (Billboard)	73
UK Album Downloads (Official Charts)	15
UK Progressive Albums (Official Charts)	4
UK Rock & Metal Albums (Official Charts)	25
US Billboard 200	33
US Top Hard Rock Albums (Billboard)	1
