= Fearless (President song) =

2025 single by President

Single by President

from the album King of Terrors
- Released: June 6, 2025
- Length: 3:35
- Label: King of Terrors / ADA
- Songwriters: The President; Vice
- Producer: The President

President singles chronology
"In the Name of the Father" (2025)	"Fearless" (2025)	"Rage" (2025)

Music video
- "Fearless" on YouTube

"Fearless" is the second single by the anonymous, masked English metal band President. It was released for digital streaming and download on 6 June 2025 via King of Terrors, accompanied by a music video.

== Background and release ==
Following their debut single "In the Name of the Father" in May 2025, President announced "Fearless" would premiere on 5 June, although it was officially released worldwide on 6 June 2025.

== Composition and lyrics ==
Revolver stated the song "follows the crunchy, anthemic, auto-tuned direction" of their first single.

== Music video ==
The music video ends with the group's frontman removing his mask, in what Revolver describes as "a big reveal that some fans say must be a fake-out".

== Live performance ==
"Fearless" was part of President’s live debut set at Download Festival on 15 June 2025. The song serves as the band’s opening track during their live performances, with the "Ike for President" jingle playing beforehand.

The song was also included in the band's performance at Rockfield Studios.

== Appearances ==
"Fearless" was featured as transition song on UFC 327.

== Personnel ==
Credits adapted from Apple Music.

- The President – production
- Vice - composition
- Zakk Cervini – mixing
- Ted Jensen – mastering

== Charts ==
Chart performance for "Fearless"
Chart (2025)	Peak position
UK Singles Downloads (OCC)	68
UK Singles Sales (OCC)	71
UK Rock & Metal (OCC)	37

== Release history ==
Region	Date	Format	Label
Worldwide	6 June 2025	Digital download, streaming	King of Terrors / ADA
