= Be Not Afraid =

Studio album by Polyphia
- Released: October 23, 2026
- Length: 46:09
- Label: Rise
- Producers: Polyphia; RJ Pasin

Polyphia chronology
Remember That You Will Die (2022)	Be Not Afraid (2026)

Singles from Be Not Afraid
- 1. "Can You Feel It" Released: June 11, 2026; 2. "Power in the Blood" Released: August 26, 2026; 3. "With Eyes to See" Released: September 24, 2026

Be Not Afraid is the fifth studio album by the American rock band Polyphia, released on October 23, 2026, via Rise Records.

== Background and promotion ==
On June 11, 2026, Polyphia released the single "Can You Feel It", alongside a visualizer featuring clips of notable political and religious figures, memes, explosions, and other footage.

On August 26, the band issued the single "Power in the Blood" and announced their upcoming fifth studio album, Be Not Afraid.

On September 24, the third single, "With Eyes to See", came out, along with a music video.

Polyphia will embark on a headlining tour in support of the album in early 2027, being delayed after the original announcement of late 2026. They will be supported by Ladrones, Perturbator, RJ Pasin, and Intervals.

== Track listing ==
All tracks are written by Polyphia.

No.	Title	Length
1.	"Let There Be Light"	4:51
2.	"With Eyes to See"	4:05
3.	"Screwtape"	2:33
4.	"Power in the Blood"	3:39
5.	"They Know Not What They Do"	3:56
6.	"Mark of the Beast"	4:29
7.	"Can You Feel It"	3:03
8.	"Near Death"	2:12
9.	"J-Bomb"	4:09
10.	"Deny the Flesh"	5:11
11.	"Devil Get Behind Me"	3:03
12.	"Fear God"	4:58
Total length:		46:09

== Personnel ==
=== Polyphia ===
- Tim Henson – guitar
- Scott LePage – guitar
- Clay Gober – bass guitar
- Clay Aeschliman – drums

=== Technical ===
- Polyphia – production
- RJ Pasin – co-production
- Spiro Dussias – co-production

== Charts ==
Chart performance for Be Not Afraid
Chart (2026)	Peak position
Japanese Digital Albums (Oricon)	29
Japanese Download Albums (Billboard Japan)	27
UK Album Downloads (Official Charts)	38
