= Aggressive (album) =

Studio album by Beartooth
- Released: June 3, 2016; December 18, 2020 (re-release version)
- Genres: Melodic hardcore; hardcore punk; post-hardcore
- Length: 39:55; 40:05 (re-release version)
- Labels: Red Bull; UNFD
- Producer: Caleb Shomo

Beartooth chronology
Disgusting (2014)	Aggressive (2016)	Disease (2018)

Singles from Aggressive
- 1. "Aggressive" Released: April 22, 2016; 2. "Always Dead" Released: April 24, 2016; 3. "Loser" Released: May 5, 2016; 4. "Hated" Released: May 20, 2016; 5. "Sick of Me" Released: May 2, 2017

Aggressive is the second studio album by American rock band Beartooth. It was released on June 3, 2016, through Red Bull Records and UNFD. The single "Aggressive" was released on April 22, 2016, along with the pre-order for the album.

== Background and release ==
In August 2015, Caleb Shomo revealed on Instagram that the band was working on new material. Shomo described the album as "intense" and "heavy," but also tried not "to make a new sound or anything." In January 2016, the group headed into the studio to record the album. In February 2016, it was announced that the group finished recording the album. On April 16, 2016, it was leaked that Beartooth would release the album, Aggressive on June 3. On April 22, the band released the title track as the lead single from the album. On April 24, the song "Always Dead" was made available on streaming. On May 5, "Loser" was released as the album's third single, premiering on Corey Taylor's Beats 1 radio show, via Apple Music. "Hated" premiered via Revolver on May 19. It was released as the fourth single the following day. On June 1, "Fair Weather Friend" was streamed exclusively via Billboard. On May 2, 2017, "Sick of Me" was serviced to rock radio as the fifth single.

On March 4, 2016, the group announced a headlining tour from March to May 2016, in support of their album, Aggressive, and were joined by Silent Planet, Ghost Key, Stray from the Path, My Ticket Home and Former. However, on April 6, the group parted ways with drummer Brandon Mullins, but stated his departure would not effect the tour. They also embarked on a fall headlining tour from October to November 2016.

On December 18, 2020, the band re-released the album with an entirely new mix and master done by Shomo on streaming and vinyl.

== Critical reception ==
Professional ratings
Aggregate scores
Source	Rating
Metacritic	82/100
Review scores
Source	Rating
AllMusic	4/5 stars
Alternative Press	Positive
Exclaim!	7/10
Kerrang!	8/10
Metal Hammer	4/5 stars
New Noise Magazine	Mixed
Rock Sound	8/10
Upset Magazine	4/5 stars

Aggressive received positive reviews from critics, based on an aggregate Metacritic score of 82/100. Neil Z. Yeung of AllMusic praised Shomo's melodies, highlighting it as his "main strengths" and compared it to the likes of Hands Like Houses, Crossfaith, and Escape the Fate. He also stated, "the lyrical attacks are effective as self-deprecating indictments, but they're also verbal missiles for lashing out against external forces." Jason Pettigrew of Alternative Press remarked, "Aggressive is probably the most compelling statement you're going to hear for the validity of heavy rock music in 2016. Shomo ducks and weaves his way through moments that are downright commercial ('Sick Of Me', 'However You Want It Said'), teeming with throat-shearing bluster ('Always Dead') or the kind of thing that gets you fitted for a straitjacket ('Censored')." Griffin J. Elliot of Exclaim! compared the album's heavy sound to Sam Carter and noted, "Shomo again collaborated with producer John Feldmann, and the result is a sonically coherent, and impressive, album that dances on the borders of multiple subgenres without ever really taking a full dive into any one." Kerrang! remarked, "Aggressive is very aggressive, but it's also the sound of a band showing their strength."

Thea de Gallier of Metal Hammer stated, "The heaps of accessible melodic moments on Aggressive could be down to the fact that being angry is tiring Caleb out. If the frenzied and honest angst of Aggressive is anything to go by, though, he isn't going to be writing his acoustic happy album just yet, because he's in his element." Gav Lloyd of Rock Sound remarked, "What makes it better than the majority of the 'heavier yet more melodic' bands out there is the fact that Caleb Shomo's raw lyrics are delivered with an intense honesty that hits harder than most."

== Commercial performance ==
Aggressive debuted at number 25 on the Billboard 200, as well as topping the Alternative Albums chart, selling 16,000 copies in its first week in the US. Internationally, the album peaked at number two on the UK Rock & Metal Albums Chart, number 18 on the Australian Albums Chart and number 28 on the Canadian Albums Chart.

== Track listing ==
All tracks written by Caleb Shomo unless specified otherwise.

No.	Title	Writer(s)	Length
1.	"Aggressive"		4:08
2.	"Hated"		3:31
3.	"Loser"		3:59
4.	"Fair Weather Friend"	David Bendeth, C. Shomo	3:24
5.	"Burnout"	John Feldmann, C. Shomo	3:04
6.	"Sick of Me"	J. Feldmann, C. Shomo	3:15
7.	"Censored"		3:36
8.	"Always Dead"		2:18
9.	"However You Want It Said"		3:17
10.	"Find a Way"		3:28
11.	"Rock Is Dead"		3:44
12.	"King of Anything"	J. Feldmann, C. Shomo	2:11
Total length:			39:55

Japanese edition bonus tracks
No.	Title	Length
13.	"Body Bag" (Live from Red Bull Studios Tokyo)	3:58
14.	"In Between" (Live from Red Bull Studios Tokyo)	3:40
15.	"Aggressive" (8-Bit remix)	3:27
Total length:		51:00

Deluxe edition re-issue bonus tracks
No.	Title	Writer(s)	Length
13.	"Hated" (acoustic version)		2:51
14.	"Sick of Me" (acoustic version)	J. Feldmann	3:07
15.	"Aggressive" (live from BBC Maida Vale)		4:03
16.	"Rock Is Dead" (live from BBC Maida Vale)		4:06
17.	"Fair Weather Friend" (live in Columbus)	D. Bendeth	3:39
18.	"King of Anything" (live in Columbus)	J. Feldmann	4:11
Total length:			61:52

Deluxe edition re-issue bonus DVD
No.	Title	Length
1.	"Live in Columbus"

== Personnel ==
Beartooth

- Caleb Shomo – vocals, all instruments

Production

- Caleb Shomo – production, engineering, mixing (re-release only)
- David Bendeth – mixing
- Ted Jensen – mastering
- Koby Nelson – mix recording engineering, digital editing
- Brian Robbins – mix engineering
- Zakk Cervini – engineering (tracks 5, 6, 12)
- Kenny "Tick" Salcido – A&R

== Charts ==
Chart (2016)	Peak position
Australian Albums (ARIA)	18
Austrian Albums (Ö3 Austria)	41
Belgian Albums (Ultratop Flanders)	108
Canadian Albums (Billboard)	28
Dutch Albums (Album Top 100)	166
German Albums (Offizielle Top 100)	80
Scottish Albums (OCC)	26
Swiss Albums (Schweizer Hitparade)	57
UK Albums (OCC)	35
UK Rock & Metal Albums (OCC)	2
US Billboard 200	25
US Top Alternative Albums (Billboard)	1
US Top Hard Rock Albums (Billboard)	3
US Top Rock Albums (Billboard)	4
