= Polyphia =

American progressive rock band

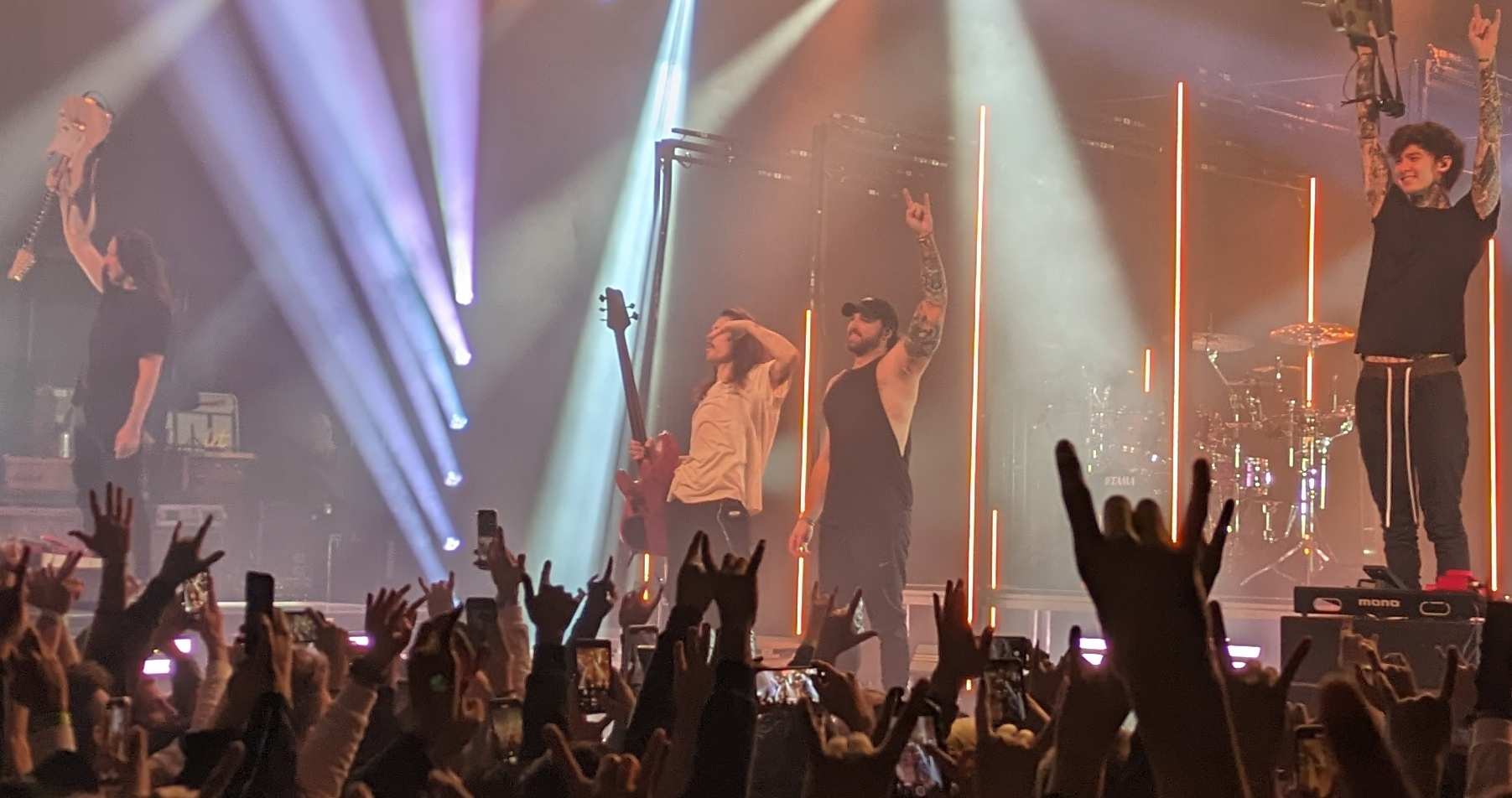
- Polyphia performing in 2023

Background information
- Origin: Plano, Texas, US
- Genres: Progressive rock; trap; instrumental rock
- Years active: 2010–present
- Labels: Headphone Music; Equal Vision; Rise
- Members: Tim Henson; Scott LePage; Clay Gober; Clay Aeschliman
- Past members: Brandon Burkhalter; Lane Duskin; Randy Methe
- Website: polyphia.com

Polyphia is an American rock band based in Plano, Texas, formed in 2010. The group consists of guitarists Tim Henson and Scott LePage, bassist Clay Gober, and drummer Clay Aeschliman. Rooted in a heavy metal sound in their early releases, the band's music evolved into a more progressive rock style in their later productions, combining elements of electronic and hip-hop music. Polyphia has released five studio albums, one live record, two EPs, and numerous singles.

Their third album, New Levels New Devils, was their first to chart, reaching 61 on the Billboard 200. Their fourth album, Remember That You Will Die, released in October 2022, debuted at number 33. Their fifth album, Be Not Afraid, came out in October 2026.

== History ==
Polyphia formed in 2010. The name of the band comes from the word "polyphony", meaning music whose texture is defined by the interweaving of several melodic lines. Polyphia first achieved success after the guitar play-through of "Impassion", from their EP Inspire, went viral on YouTube. Since then, the band's popularity has grown and they have shared the stage with progressive metalcore artists such as Periphery, Between the Buried and Me, and August Burns Red. The band's music originally fit into the metalcore genre and eventually shifted to a rock sound. They have experimented with more accessible mainstream genres such as pop, funk, and electronic on their first full-length album, Muse, released in 2014. The record also featured other guitarists on several tracks, which the band has cited as a source of inspiration.

Polyphia was signed to Equal Vision Records after Muse charted on the Billboard Top 100, which led to its reissue in 2015. Their second album, Renaissance, released in 2016, maintained a fusion of pop, hip-hop, and EDM elements. The band released their third studio album, New Levels New Devils, in October 2018.

In September 2022, they issued the single "Ego Death", the fourth from their latest album, Remember That You Will Die. This was accompanied by a video, both of which feature guitar virtuoso Steve Vai. Remember That You Will Die was released in October 2022 and also includes appearances by Sophia Black, Brasstracks, $NOT, and Chino Moreno. In October 2022, Polyphia announced a 15-date European tour to support the record.

The band published their first live album, Live at the Factory in Deep Ellum, on November 24, 2023. The 16-track album was recorded on April 14, during the Remember That You Will Die tour at the Factory in Dallas, Texas.

In August 2026, they announced their fifth studio album, Be Not Afraid, scheduled for publication on October 23, 2026. This coincided with their release of the single Power in the Blood.

== Style and influences ==
Polyphia was originally known for their guitar covers of classical songs on YouTube. The band mixes elements of instrumental and progressive rock with EDM, funk, and hip hop.

This sound was further developed with the release of their third EP, The Most Hated, and third full-length album, New Levels New Devils, which featured production from hip hop and EDM producers Judge and Y2K.

Their fourth studio album, Remember That You Will Die, has continued in this vein, further exploring "trap percussion and hip hop stylings", as well as incorporating a variety of genres, such as bubblegum pop and bossa nova.

The band has stated that their influences come from artists of all genres. They started out with a heavier shred-oriented style but have since created a more melodic-focused sound. Groups like Within the Ruins and Job for a Cowboy were their biggest inspirations when creating their first EP, Inspire. When describing the album Muse, guitarist Tim Henson says that the primary inspiration came from pop and rap music.

== Gear ==
Tim Henson is an Ibanez endorser, with two current signature guitars, the TOD10N and the TOD10. The THBB10 had a roasted maple neck, a Gotoh tremolo bridge with locking machine heads, as well as DiMarzio pickups. The TOD10N is a nylon-string electric guitar, with a unique "Tree of Death" inlay conceived by Henson. The TOD10 (not to be confused with the TOD10N) is a solid-body guitar. It has a roasted maple neck with the "Tree of Death" inlay first seen on the TOD10N, Gotoh tremolo bridge and locking machine heads, and a set of Fishman Fluence Tim Henson Signature humbucker pickups. Additionally, Henson has worked with Neural DSP to release the "Archetype: Tim Henson" plugin, which contains three simulated amps and Henson's signature "Multivoicer" attachment.

Scott LePage has one current Ibanez signature guitar, the KRYS10, and the SLM10, which is out of production. The SLM10 had a roasted maple neck, a Gotoh tremolo bridge with locking machine heads DiMarzio pickups, and a quilted maple top with a transparent red matte finish. The KRYS10 also has a roasted maple neck and Gotoh tremolo bridge with locking machine heads, but the pickups are instead a set of Fishman Fluence Scott LePage Signature humbuckers.

Clay Aeschliman endorses TAMA Drums and Meinl Percussion.

Clay Gober uses Ibanez bass guitars, most commonly those in the Ibanez SR series.

== Band members ==
Current

- Tim Henson – guitar (2010–present)
- Scott LePage – guitar (2010–present)
- Clay Gober – bass guitar (2012–present)
- Clay Aeschliman – drums (2016–present)

Past

- Brandon Burkhalter – drums (2010–2014; 2015–2016), clean vocals (2010–2011)
- Lane Duskin – vocals (2010–2012)
- Randy Methe – drums (2014–2015)

Timeline

== Discography ==
=== Studio albums ===
List of studio albums, with selected details and peak chart positions
Title	Details	Peak chart positions		
Title	Details	US	AUS	CAN
Muse	Released: September 2, 2014; Label: Independent; Format: CD, LP, digital download, streaming	—	—	—
Renaissance	Released: March 11, 2016; Label: Equal Vision; Format: CD, LP, digital download, streaming	—	—	—
New Levels New Devils	Released: October 12, 2018; Label: Equal Vision; Format: CD, LP, digital download, streaming	61	—	—
Remember That You Will Die	Released: October 28, 2022; Label: Rise; Format: CD, cassette, digital download, streaming	33	72	73
Be Not Afraid	Released: October 23, 2026; Label: Rise; Format: CD, cassette, digital download, streaming	—	—	—
"—" denotes a recording that did not chart or was not released in that territory.

=== Live albums ===
List of studio albums, with selected details and peak chart positions
Title	Details
Live at the Factory in Deep Ellum	Released: November 24, 2023; Label: Rise; Format: digital download, streaming

=== EPs ===
List of EPs, with selected details
Title	Details
Resurrect	Released: November 13, 2011; Label: Independent; Format: digital download, streaming
Inspire	Released: April 21, 2013; Label: Independent; Format: digital download, streaming
The Most Hated	Released: July 14, 2017; Label: Independent; Format: digital download, streaming

=== Singles ===
List of singles, with year released
Title	Year	Album
"Envision" (featuring Rick Graham)	2013	Non-album singles
"LIT"	2017	Non-album singles
"G.O.A.T."	2018	New Levels New Devils
"O.D."	2018	New Levels New Devils
"Yas" (featuring Mario Camarena and Erick Hansel)	2018	New Levels New Devils
"Look But Don't Touch" (featuring Lewis Grant)	2019	Non-album singles
"Inferno"	2019	Non-album singles
"Playing God"	2022	Remember That You Will Die
"Neurotica"	2022	Remember That You Will Die
"ABC" (featuring Sophia Black)	2022	Remember That You Will Die
"Ego Death" (featuring Steve Vai)	2022	Remember That You Will Die
"Can You Feel It"	2026	Be Not Afraid
"Power in the Blood"	2026	Be Not Afraid
