= King of Terrors =

2025 EP by President

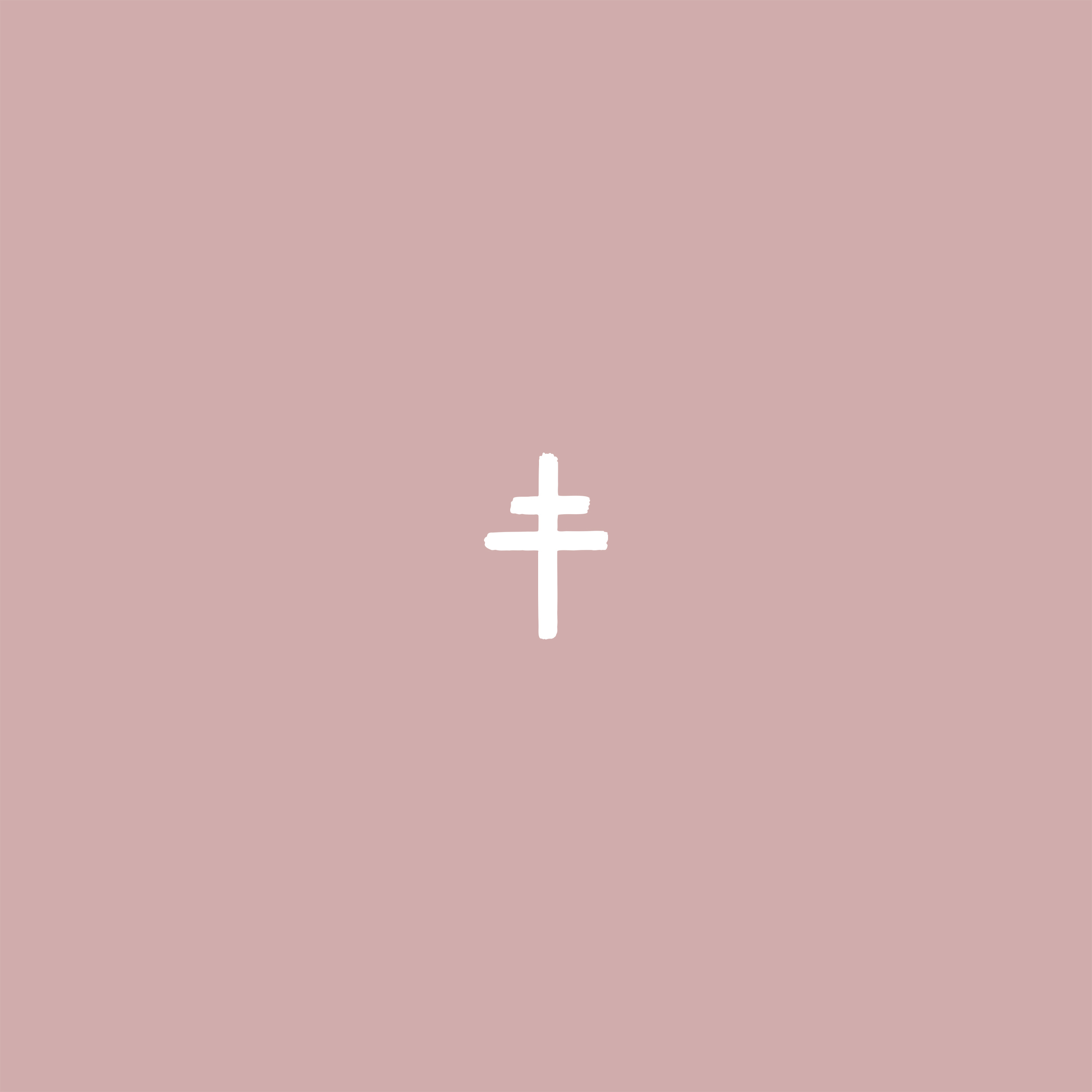
- Standard edition cover

EP by President
- Released: 26 September 2025
- Length: 20:37
- Label: King of Terrors / ADA
- Producer: The President

President chronology
King of Terrors (2025)	Blood of Your Empire (2026)

Singles from King of Terrors
- 1. "In the Name of the Father" Released: 15 May 2025; 2. "Fearless" Released: 6 June 2025; 3. "Rage" Released: 18 July 2025; 4. "Destroy Me" Released: 4 September 2025

King of Terrors is the debut EP by the anonymous, masked English metal band President. It was released on 26 September 2025.

== Background ==
Following the writing of "In the Name of the Father", the band spent the next eight months working on the rest of the songs that make up the EP. The EP itself was announced in July 2025, alongside the release of the single "Rage". The EP was recorded and self-produced by The President himself.

== Musical style and themes ==
Lyrical and visual themes explore darkness, religion, and death, tied to the Biblical "King of Terrors", which is a reference to death found in Job 18:14. When asked about the album's theme and title, The President had the following to say:

"It’s the ultimate marker – if there's nothing after death then that changes everything about life, and the same is true if there is something. My uncle passed away a few years ago, and that was the first time I'd had someone die who was close to me when I wasn't part of this religious thinking. It hit me really hard. So King [o]f Terrors sums up the journey I've been on."

He went on to say that the EP was conceived as a deeply personal and emotional project, created without regard for external opinions or conventional song structure, emphasizing authentic self-expression over commercial or critical expectations.

== Formats and editions ==
King of Terrors was released digitally and on limited-edition vinyl, including grey marble (limited to 1000), turquoise marble (limited 1000), black and blue galaxy (limited to 500) and white variants.

== Live performances ==
Before the EP's release, President performed most of its tracks live at their debut Download Festival set in June 2025.

== Promotion ==
Pre-orders launched in July 2025, with exclusive bundles and vinyl editions. President also announced live appearances, including a headline show at The Garage, London that took place on 30 July 2025, their first U.S. headline concerts in December 2025 (New York City and Los Angeles), and additional shows planned for Australia and Europe. Further tours opening for Architects and Bad Omens were announced later.

== Critical reception ==
Professional ratings
Review scores
Source	Rating
Kerrang!	4/5
Metal Hammer	3.5/5 stars
Sputnikmusic	2/5

Upon its release, King of Terrors received mixed to favorable reviews. Metal Hammer rated the EP 3.5/5 stating "Where President’s real promise lies, though, is in their eagerness to experiment", comparing them to Sleep Token and Bilmuri. Kerrang! gave it 4/5, stating "listeners will have decided whether the blend of metal heft and post-hardcore crunch with hip-swivelling R&B, ambient electro and earworm alt.pop is for them. Seeing all six tracks ... underlines the soulful power at play, and offers a fabulous chance to digest it all and join the dots of a bigger picture still emerging".

== Track listing ==
All tracks written and produced by The President, except where noted.

King of Terrors track listing
No.	Title	Writer(s)	Length
1.	"In the Name of the Father"		3:47
2.	"Fearless"	The President, Vice	3:35
3.	"Rage"		4:08
4.	"Destroy Me"		2:42
5.	"Dionysus"		3:02
6.	"Conclave"	The President, Vice	3:23
Total length:			20:37

Notes

- "Rage" is stylised in all caps.

== Charts ==
Chart performance for King of Terrors
Chart (2025)	Peak position
Australian Albums (ARIA)	25
