= President (band) =

British metalcore band

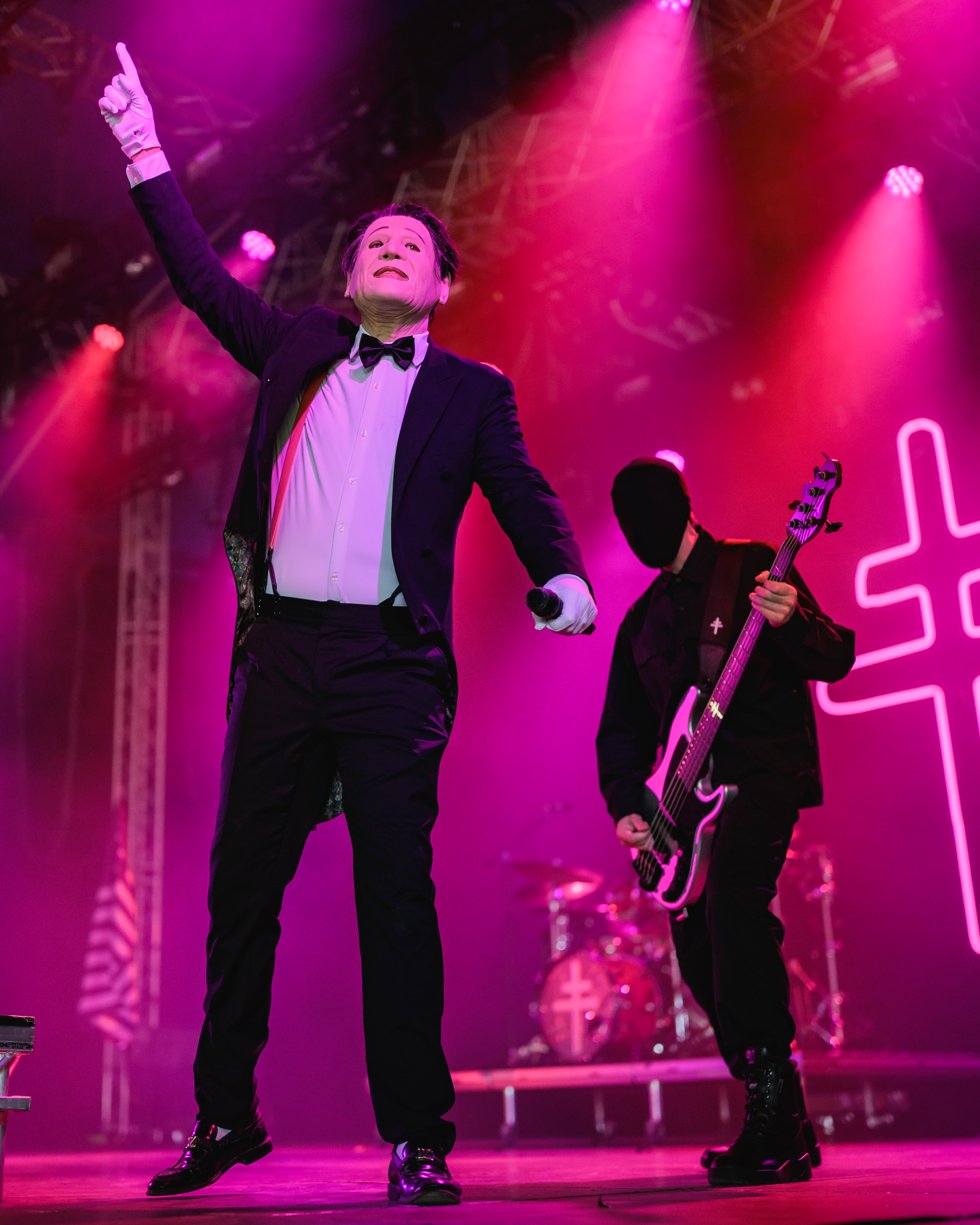
- President performing at the Tons of Rock festival in 2026.

Background information
- Origin: United Kingdom
- Genres: Metalcore; post-metalcore
- Years active: 2025–present
- Label: Atlantic
- Members: The President; Heist; Protest; Vice
- Website: presidentband.com

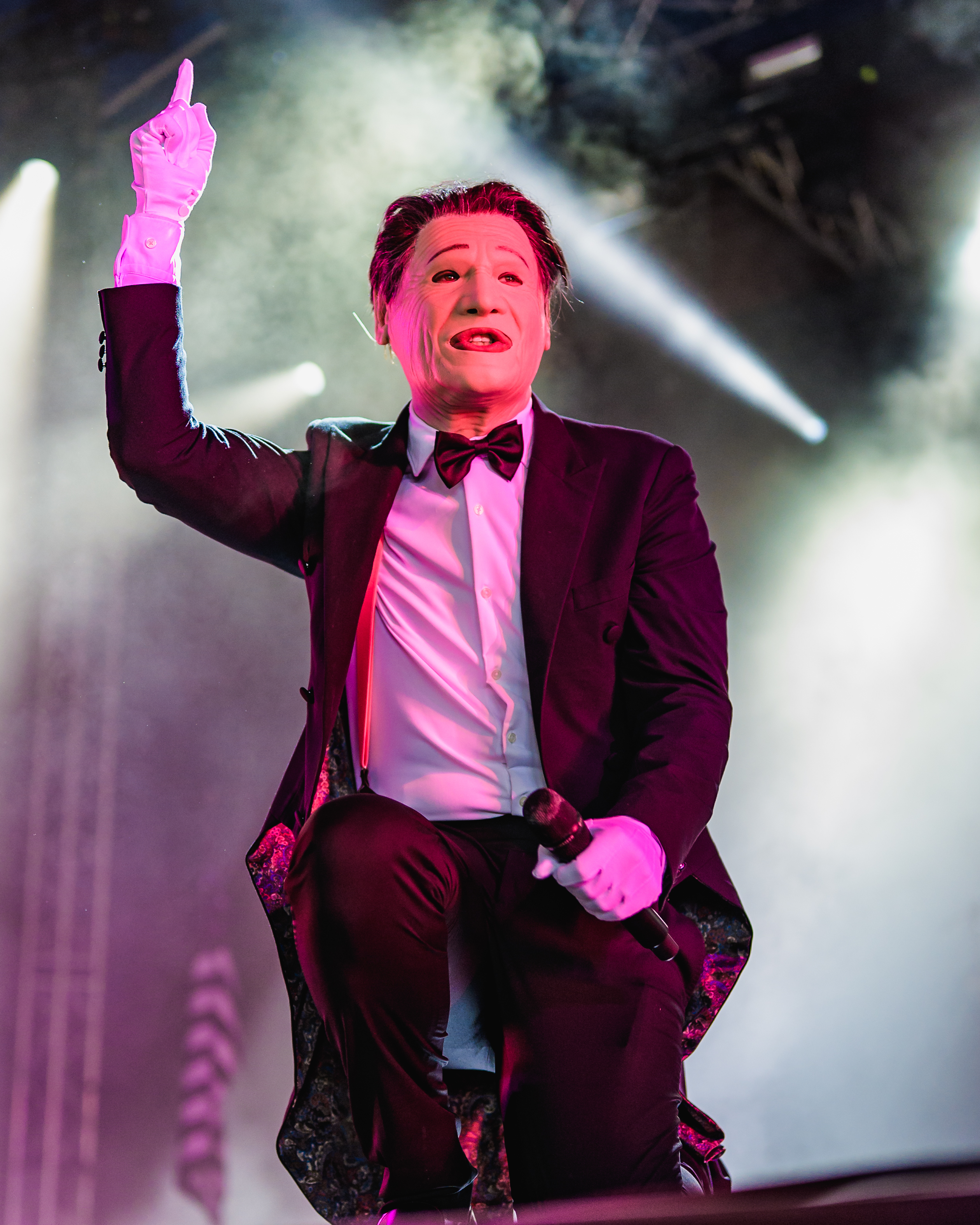
The President

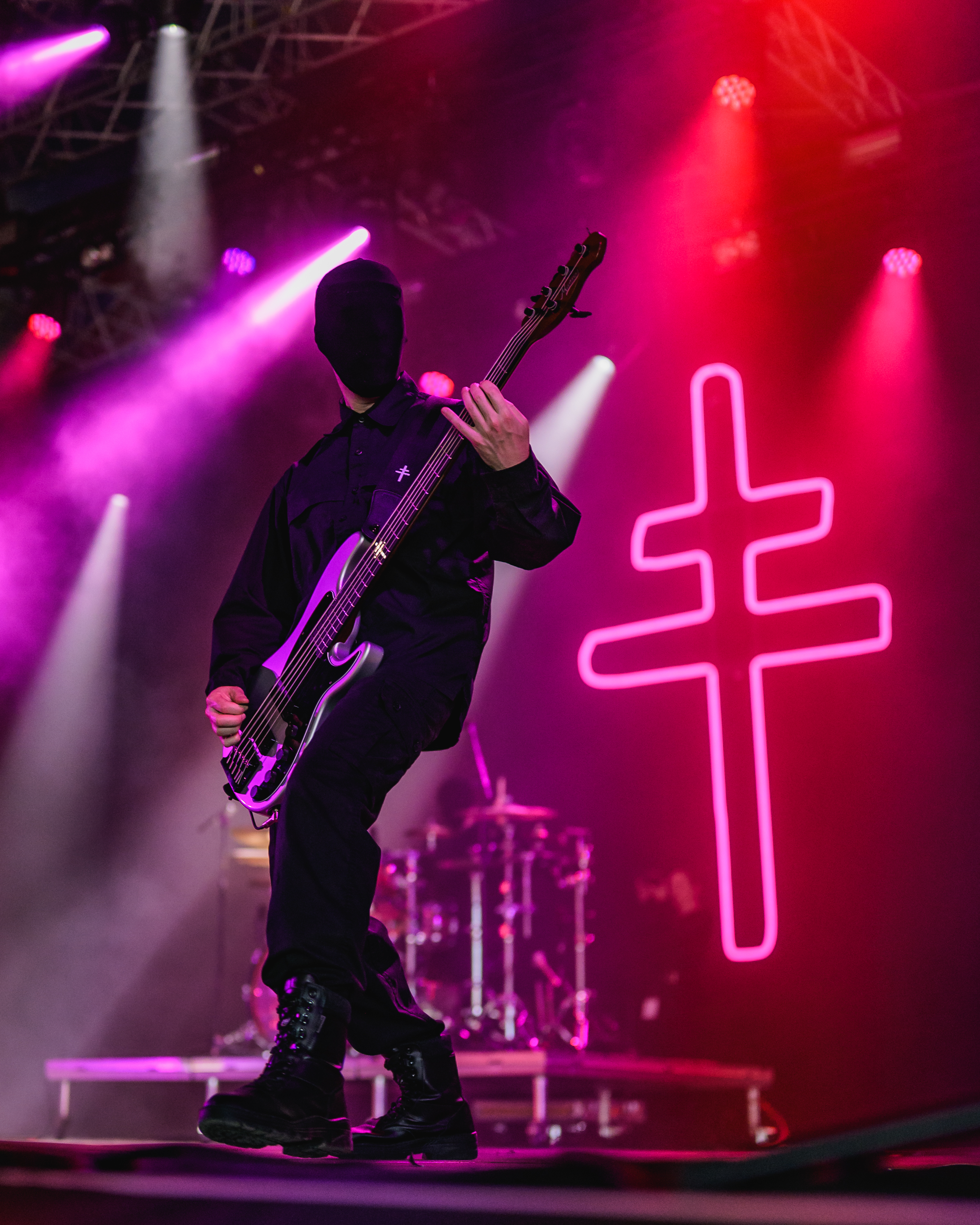
Protest

President (stylised in all caps) are an anonymous English band formed in 2025, who blend metalcore with electronica. The band had released no music and were unknown until they were announced to play at that year's Download Festival, sparking speculation about their identity. Their frontman, the eponymous President, is described by Revolver as "silver-haired, wearing an eerie, not-quite-lifelike mask etched with deep wrinkles and radiating wax-figure unease". They released their debut EP, King of Terrors, in 2025. Their debut studio album, Blood of Your Empire, was released on 4 September 2026.

The band's current lineup consists of The President (vocals), Heist (guitarist), Protest (bassist) and Vice (drummer).

== History ==
=== Beginnings and initial releases ===
In an interview with Revolver, it was revealed that the band began as a solo project and later expanded into a full band. Development of the project occurred over several years in complete secrecy until the band was announced as a performer at the 2025 Download Festival in February 2025, confusing fans as no details were released as to who the band was and they had released no music. Shortly afterward, the band created an Instagram page and started posting cryptic teasers.

In April 2025, they released a teaser for a new song, their debut single "In The Name of the Father", released on 15 May 2025. The song was named "Tune of the Week" on BBC Radio 1 and they appeared on the cover of an issue of Rock Sound. Speculation ran rampant on who the band was, as fans discovered ties to the band with several companies used by another masked band Sleep Token (who were headlining Download Festival that year) and using similar iconography to Crosses. On May 21, they announced their first headlining show at The Garage in London. The show, which took place on July 30, sold out in less than 48 hours. A second single, "Fearless", was released on 5 June 2025. The band debuted at Download Festival 2025 in June 2025. Their performance was praised by Kerrang! as an "absolute pandemonium from the off," and was favorably received by the crowd. The band was later announced to open for Architects for several dates between December 2025 and January 2026.

=== King of Terrors (2025) ===
On 18 July 2025, the band announced their debut EP, King of Terrors, scheduled for release on 26 September, alongside the unveiling of its third single, "Rage". The fourth single, "Destroy Me", followed on 4 September. Shortly after, the band were announced as headliners for TakeDown Festival 2026, which took place at Portsmouth Guildhall on 4 April 2026.

In an interview published on 17 September in Kerrang!, the band confirmed they were working on their debut studio album, which would further expand the narrative and mythology surrounding the President character. Later that month, President were added to several major European festivals for 2026, including Slam Dunk Festival (23–24 May), Nova Rock Festival (12 June), Rock for People (13 June), Tons of Rock (25–28 June), and Copenhell (24–27 June).

The band's rapid rise prompted speculation that President may be an industry plant. The frontman dismissed the suggestion as "bewildering", stating that King of Terrors was self-produced, independently released, and promoted through grassroots support from friends and online communities, without involvement from a record label or major industry backing.

The EP was released worldwide on 26 September, accompanied by neon-styled visualizer videos for both "Dionysus" and "Conclave". Following the EP's release, President announced a one-off Australian headline show which took place on 12 December, coinciding with their support tour alongside Architects. The band were subsequently confirmed for an appearance at the Greenfield Festival (11–13 June).

On 28 October, President were announced as a supporting act, alongside Beartooth, on Bad Omens's 2026 North American arena tour, which concluded on 27 March 2026 at the Oakland Arena.

In a 24 November interview with Metal Hammer, President's frontman confirmed that the band has been working on their debut full-length album, with four songs already written. He described the record as an evolution of their EP, expanding on its sound while retaining select elements from it.

=== Signing to Atlantic and Blood of Your Empire (2026–present) ===
On 11 February 2026, President teased a new single titled "Angel Wings", which was released on 18 February alongside the announcement that the band had signed with Atlantic Records. On 23 February, President was announced for Louder Than Life 2026, with their performance scheduled for 18 September.

The following month, the band teased "Mercy", which was released on 26 March. Four days later, President announced their first North American headlining tour, beginning on 4 September in Nashville, Tennessee, and concluding on 14 October in Dallas, Texas, with support from Showing Teeth and Cenobia. Of the 26 scheduled dates, 22 sold out within 24 hours of going on general sale.

On 14 May, "Doom Loop" was announced as the band's next single. It was released on 21 May alongside the announcement of President's debut studio album, Blood of Your Empire, scheduled for release on 4 September. The following day, the band announced a headlining tour of the United Kingdom and Europe, beginning in Stockholm, Sweden, on 1 November and concluding in London, United Kingdom, on 24 November.

On 23 July, President teased "Dark Heaven" as the album's next single, before releasing it on 30 July. On 21 August, the band announced their first Australian headlining tour, scheduled to run from 19 to 27 February 2027.

On 28 August, it was revealed that Cenobia would no longer support President on the North American tour. Blood of Your Empire was released on 4 September, the same day President began their North American headlining tour in Nashville, Tennessee.

Following the conclusion of their North American headlining tour, on 9 November, the band announced their largest headlining concert to date, scheduled for 17 May 2027 at Radio City Music Hall in New York City, a venue with a capacity of approximately 6,000.

On 12 November, President were announced as part of the 2027 Download Festival lineup, marking their return to the festival two years after their debut in 2025.

== Musical style, themes, and imagery ==
"This is not an anti-religious project, it's not an anti-government project, it's not an anti-politics project. It's about dealing with inner questions."

— The President on the band's purpose

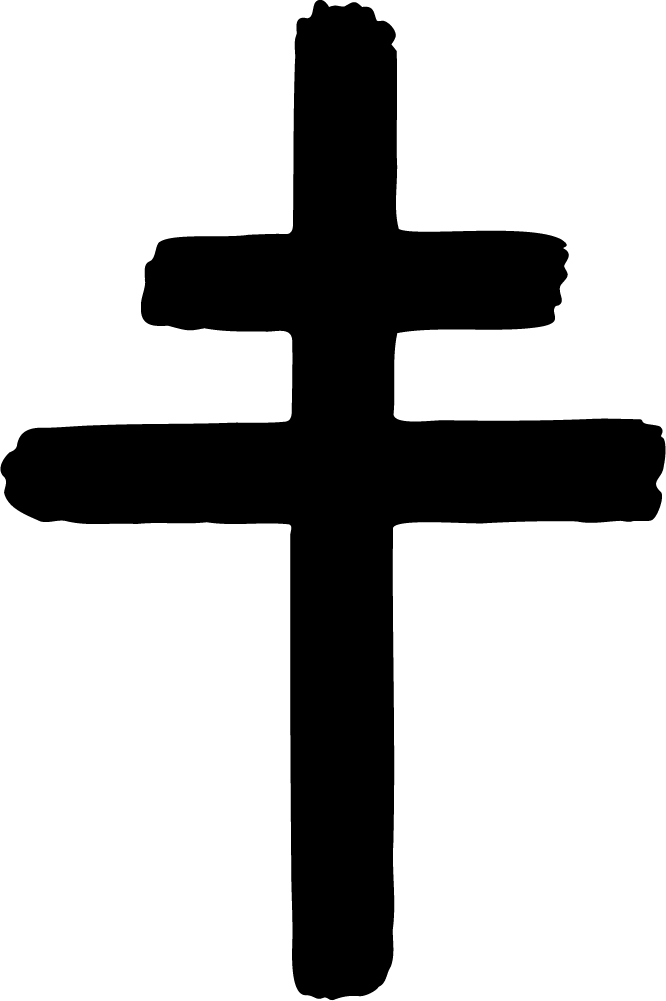
Official band logotype featuring a patriarchal cross.

The band's music has been described as metalcore, with elements of alternative pop, and electronica. VICE described the band's post-metalcore style as "deeply compelling" and praised their songwriting style for being "refreshingly honest."

President's work often explores themes of religion, mortality, and existential fear. Their debut EP, King of Terrors, references the biblical figure associated with death, highlighting mortality as a central motif.

The band's frontman has described the project as rooted in a personal crisis shaped by religion and loss, and has said, "I didn't want it to feel modern, I wanted it to feel like something else. We wanted to add an element of [...] discomfort, kind of in the way The Shining makes you uncomfortable. I wanted it to feel beautiful but unsettling."

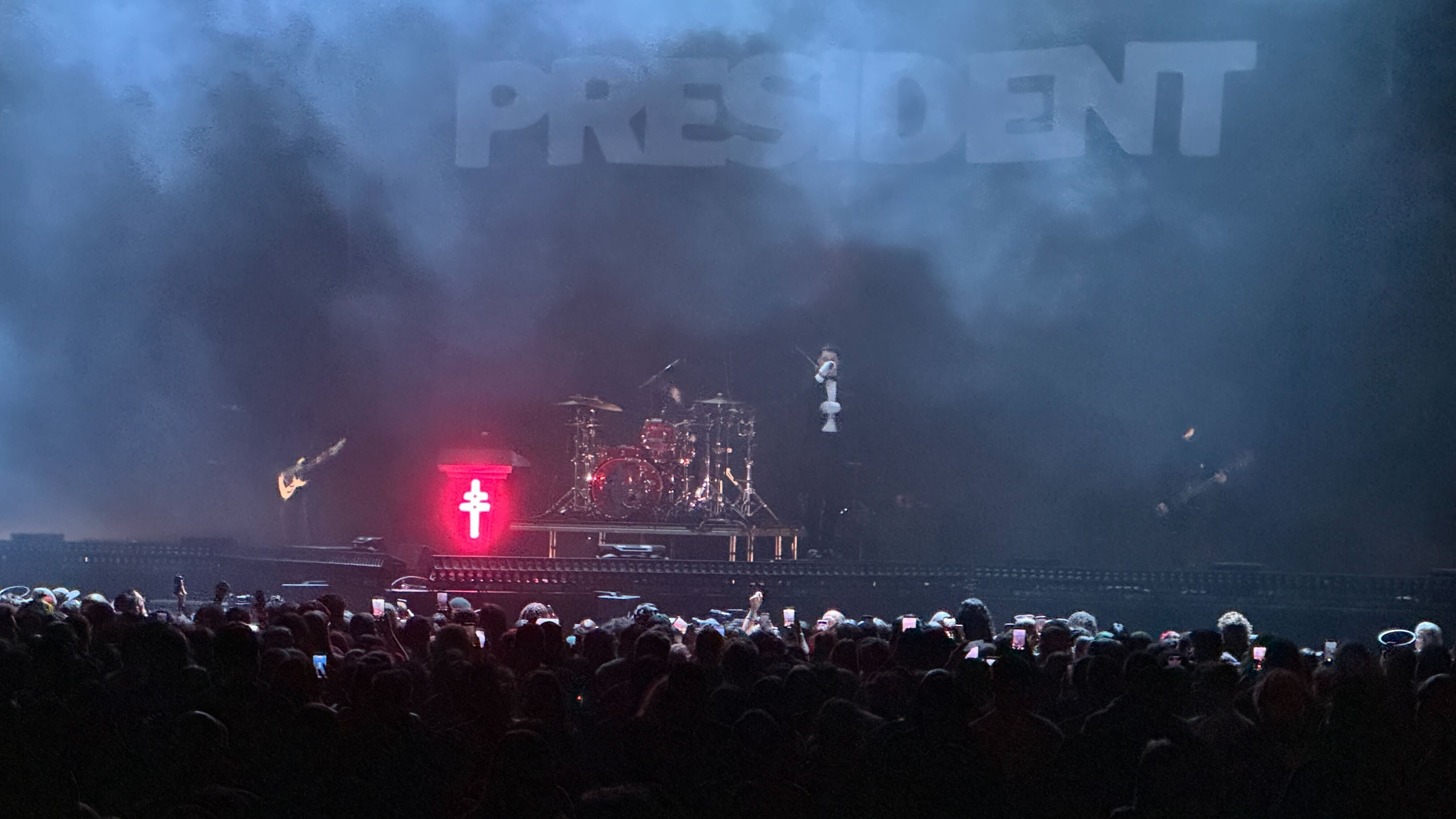
President live in 2026

While their identities remain concealed, multiple sources have suggested the masked lead vocalist is Charlie Simpson, co-lead vocalist and guitarist for Busted and former frontman for Fightstar. The frontman has stated that their true identity is "not ever going to be acknowledged."

The band incorporates political campaign themes into its public image and press releases. Fans are referred to as "citizens," live performances are presented as "rallies," promotional materials are referred to as "endorsements," music videos as "broadcasts," and fans are encouraged to "join the campaign" to receive updates.

=== Comparison with Sleep Token ===
Since President's debut in 2025, critics have frequently compared the band to Sleep Token, citing their shared use of anonymity, masks and a similarly theatrical presentation. The comparison has been amplified by the fact that both acts share management under Future History.

The band's frontman has rejected the parallels, describing the Sleep Token comparisons as "fucking lazy" and arguing that the similarities are largely superficial.

== Band members ==
- The President – lead vocals, production (2025–present)
- Heist – guitars (2025–present)
- Protest – bass (2025–present)
- Vice – drums (2025–present)

== Discography ==
=== Albums ===
Title	Details	Peak chart positions								
Title	Details	UK	UK Rock	AUS	AUT	BEL (FL)	GER	NLD	NZ	US
Blood of Your Empire	Released: 4 September 2026; Label: Atlantic; Formats: CD, LP, digital download, streaming	5	1	9	18	21	45	76	30	67

=== Extended plays ===
Title	EP details	Peak chart positions
Title	EP details	AUS
King of Terrors	Released: 26 September 2025; Label: King of Terrors / ADA; Formats: CD, DL, streaming	25

=== Singles ===
Title	Year	Peak chart positions							Album
Title	Year	UK Sales	UK Rock	UK Down.	UK Indie	US Hard Rock	US Main.	US Rock Air.	Album
"In the Name of the Father"	2025	52	19	50	41	14	—	—	King of Terrors (EP)
"Fearless"	2025	71	37	68	—	24	—	—	King of Terrors (EP)
"Rage"	2025	98	32	93	—	—	—	—	King of Terrors (EP)
"Destroy Me"	2025	95	31	92	—	22	17	47	King of Terrors (EP)
"Angel Wings"	2026	99	—	89	—	13	—	—	Blood of Your Empire
"Mercy"	2026	—	—	—	—	15	—	—	Blood of Your Empire
"Doom Loop"	2026	—	—	—	—	8	—	—	Blood of Your Empire
"Dark Heaven"	2026	—	—	—	—	10	—	—	Blood of Your Empire
"—" denotes releases that did not chart.

=== Other charted songs ===
Title	Year	Peak chart positions			Album
Title	Year	NZ Hot	US Hard Rock	US Main.	Album
"Dionysus"	2025	—	19	—	Blood of Your Empire
"Sleepwalker"	2026	40	2	35	Blood of Your Empire
"Pink Noise"	2026	—	15	—	Blood of Your Empire
"White Devil"	2026	—	25	—	Blood of Your Empire

=== Music videos ===
Title	Year	Director(s)	Album
"In the Name of the Father"	2025	Blindeye	King of Terrors (EP)
"Fearless"	2025	Blindeye	King of Terrors (EP)
"Rage"	2025	Blindeye	King of Terrors (EP)
"Destroy Me"	2025	Blindeye	King of Terrors (EP)
"Angel Wings"	2026	B.K. Barone	Blood of Your Empire
"Doom Loop"	2026	Zak Pinchin	Blood of Your Empire
"Dark Heaven"	2026	Unknown	Blood of Your Empire

== Awards and nominations ==
All awards and nominations listed should be in chronological order by the date they were nominated.

Year	Award	Nominee/work	Title	Result	Ref.
2025	Nocturnal Awards	"Destroy Me"	Feels Are Reals	Nominated	
2025	Nocturnal Awards	"In The Name of the Father"	Radio Song of the Year	Nominated	
2025	Nocturnal Awards	President	Masked Musician of the Year	Nominated	
2025	Rock Sound Awards	President	Best New Artist	Won	
2025	Drumeo Awards	Vice	Metal Drummer of The Year	Nominated	
2026	Heavy Music Awards	President	Best Breakthrough Live Artist	Nominated	
2026	Heavy Music Awards	President	Best UK Breakthrough Band	Won	
2026	MoreCore Music Awards	"Doom Loop"	Song of the Year	Nominated	
2026	Bigmouth Music Awards	"Angel Wings"	Video of The Year	Nominated	
2026	Bigmouth Music Awards	Blood of Your Empire	Album of The Year	Nominated	
2026	Bigmouth Music Awards	President	Future Icons Awards	Nominated	
