= Dacelynn =

American singer-songwriter

- Born: Dacelynn Dawn Guest; February 13, 2004 (age 22); Texas, U.S.
- Genres: Indie pop; Indie folk; Bedroom pop
- Instruments: Vocals; guitar
- Years active: 2019–present
- Label: Nettwerk

Dacelynn Dawn Guest (born February 13, 2004), known professionally as Dacelynn (stylized in lowercase) is an American singer-songwriter. She is best known for her song "80's Makeout Session" which became a viral hit after its release in 2019.

== Early life ==
Dacelynn grew up in Fort Worth, Texas. She began creating music around 2019 while in high school, initially uploading music covers online before teaching herself songwriting with GarageBand. She began writing songs for fun, not expecting them to reach a wide audience.

== Career ==
Dacelynn released "80's Makeout Session" as a single to SoundCloud on July 17, 2019, which was followed by release on digital streaming platforms on July 24, 2019. It has since amassed over 27 million streams on Spotify and was considered a viral breakout hit by multiple publications.

In 2020, Dacelynn released the EP Twine, which included the song "Serotonin Thief", which was featured in the short film Cherry Bomb by Carolyn Knapp.

She continued to release singles, including "Tell Me What You Want" in 2021, "Stars" in 2022, "Nobody's Home" and "Cracked Teeth" in 2023, and "Rip You Open" in 2024, during which she began traveling from Texas to Los Angeles for collaborative writing sessions.

In 2024, she appeared on the song "Baby Bangs" by Frances Forever, and signed with Nettwerk Music Group.

In 2025, Dacelynn released the song "Russian Doll" after initially sharing a demo of it online, which rapidly gained attention and amassed hundreds of cover versions and half a million streams. She has described this song, which is about identity and compartmentalization, as her most vulnerable.

After the success of "Russian Doll", she released further singles, including "Moat" and "Porcelain", which were included on her EP Nine Lives, released December 12, 2025. The EP is an indie pop and indie folk project which documents several years of personal growth, with themes including love, loss, self-discovery, and vulnerability. She has described the EP as a "collage of music" that was written over the course of almost two years. Nine Lives utilized multiple collaborators, including Devon Again, Sophie Truax, and Runnner.

In 2026, Dacelynn appeared on the song "Do It Again" by Brye, from the album Cycle Breaker. Dacelynn has supported both Johnny Orlando and Brye as an opening act in June 2026.

== Musical style ==
Dacelynn has cited artists like Dodie, Chloe Moriondo and Grace VanderWaal as her initial inspirations. Her music often features gentle guitars, understated production and highly personal lyrics, which have been described as "like poetry". Her style sits somewhere between indie folk and edgier pop music, most recently referencing artists like Adrianne Lenker, Lomelda, Daffo and Slow Pulp.

== Personal life ==
Dacelynn is a queer artist and uses she/they pronouns. She moved to Los Angeles in August 2024.

== Discography ==
=== Extended plays ===
Title	Details
Twine	Released: November 30, 2019; Label: Self-released
PR!DE	Released: August 11, 2020; Label: Self-released
Nine Lives	Released: December 5, 2025; Label: Nettwerk

=== Singles ===
==== As lead artist ====
Title	Year	Album
"80's Makeout Session"	2019	Non-album single
"Dumb Brain Hours"	2019	Non-album single
"Love and Doubt"	2021	Non-album single
"Tell Me What You Want"	2021	Non-album single
"Stars"	2022	Non-album single
"Nobody's Home"	2023	Non-album single
"Cracked Teeth"	2023	Non-album single
"Rip You Open"	2024	Nine Lives
"Russian Doll (Smaller)"	2025	Nine Lives
"Russian Doll"	2025	Nine Lives
"Dog Eat Dog"	2025	Nine Lives
"Moat"	2025	Nine Lives
"Porcelain"	2025	Nine Lives

==== As featured artist ====
Title	Year	Album/EP
"Baby Bangs" (Frances Forever featuring dacelynn)	2024	Lockjaw
"Do It Again" (Brye featuring dacelynn)	2026	Cycle Breaker
