= Under My Influence =

- Cover for the standard edition; the deluxe edition removes the blue tint for a naturalistic lighting

Studio album by The Aces
- Released: July 17, 2020
- Genre: Indie pop
- Length: 44:51
- Language: English
- Label: Red Bull
- Producer: Mike Green; Christian Medice; Matias Mora; Benjamin Rice (vocals); Jesse Shatkin; Zach Skelton; Valley Girl; Keith Varon

The Aces chronology
When My Heart Felt Volcanic (2018)	Under My Influence (2020)	I've Loved You for So Long (2023)

Under My Influence is a 2020 studio album by American indie pop group The Aces. It has received positive reviews from critics.

== Reception ==
Under My Influence received mostly positive reviews from critics noted at review aggregator Metacritic. It has a weighted average score of 65 out of 100, based on four reviews. In Clash Magazine, Zoya Raza-Sheikh rated this album a 5 out of 10, characterizing it as "a bold undertaking" that "at times... feels unfinished", writing that it "erratically comes together offering a patchwork collection of songs that don’t quite compliment on another". The Line of Best Fit's Eloise Bulmer also praises the band for experimenting with their sound, but writes that a "shorter tracklist would have strengthened the album" and "it's easy to imagine this album being seen as transitionary in hindsight". Writing for Paste, Candace McDuffie rated Under My Influence an 8.6 out of 10, stating that it "encapsulates a unit who have perfected their chemistry so much that they are approaching their prime with precision, passion and grace".

== Track listing ==
1. "Daydream" (Nick Bailey, Katie Henderson, McKenna Petty, Alisa Ramirez, Cristal Ramirez, and Keith Varon) – 2:31
2. "New Emotion" (Henderson, Petty, A. Ramirez, C. Ramirez, and Kyle Shearer) – 3:01
3. "My Phone Is Trying to Kill Me" (Henderson, Petty, A. Ramirez, C. Ramirez, Zach Skelton, and Justin Tranter) – 2:55
4. "Kelly" (Nate Campany, Henderson, Petty, A. Ramirez, C. Ramirez, and Shearer) – 3:08
5. "Can You Do" (Henderson, Christian Medice, Petty, A. Ramirez, and C. Ramirez) – 2:27
6. "All Mean Nothing" (Mike Green, Henderson, Petty, A. Ramirez, C. Ramirez, and Simon Wilcox) – 3:54
7. "801" (Henderson, Medice, Petty, A. Ramirez, and C. Ramirez) – 3:34
8. "I Can Break Your Heart Too" (Henderson, Medice, Petty, A. Ramirez, and C. Ramirez) – 3:35
9. "Lost Angeles" (Green, Henderson, Petty, A. Ramirez, C. Ramirez, and Wilcox) – 3:12
10. "Not Enough" (Henderson, Matias Mora, Petty, A. Ramirez, C. Ramirez, and Susanna Yankou) – 3:06
11. "Cruel" (Henderson, Medice, Petty, A. Ramirez, and C. Ramirez) – 3:16
12. "Thought of You" (Green, Henderson, Petty, A. Ramirez, and C. Ramirez) – 3:10
13. "Going Home" (Henderson, Medice, Petty, A. Ramirez, and C. Ramirez) – 3:56
14. "Zillionaire" (Henderson, Petty, A. Ramirez, C. Ramirez, Jesse Shatkin, and Dylan Wiggins) – 3:13

Bonus tracks on deluxe edition

15. "Sleepy Eyes" – 3:19
16. "Aren’t You" – 2:42
17. "Good Time" – 2:33
18. "Kelly" (Fickle Friends remix) (Campany, Henderson, Petty, A. Ramirez, C. Ramirez, and Shearer) – 3:04
19. "Daydream" (Snakehips remix) (Bailey, Henderson, Petty, A. Ramirez, C. Ramirez, and Varon) – 2:55
20. "Daydream (Portugal. The Man remix) (Bailey, Henderson, Petty, A. Ramirez, C. Ramirez, and Varon) – 3:08

== Personnel ==
The Aces

- Katie Henderson – lead guitar, vocals, executive production
- McKenna Petty – bass guitar, vocals, executive production
- Alisa Ramirez – drums, vocals, executive production
- Cristal Ramirez – lead vocals, rhythm guitar, executive production

Additional personnel

- Leroy Clampitt – bass guitar on "Zillionaire"
- Chris Gehringer – mastering at Sterling Sound
- Mike Green – production on "All Mean Nothing", "Lost Angeles", "Thought of You", and "Going Home"
- Josh Gudwin – mixing at Henson Recording Studios
- Elijah Marrett-Hitch – mixing assistance
- Christian Medice – production on "Can You Do", "801", "I Can Break Your Heart Too", and "Cruel"
- Matias Mora – production
- Will Quinnell – mastering assistance
- Benjamin Rice – vocal production on "Going Home"
- Buddy Ross – keyboards on "Zillionaire"
- Jesse Shatkin – production on "Zillionaire"
- Zach Skelton – production on "My Phone Is Trying to Kill Me"
- Valley Girl – production on "New Emotion" and "Kelly"
- Keith Varon – production on "Daydream"
- Kenny "Tick" Salcido - A&R

== See also ==
- List of 2020 albums
