= Cavetown =

English singer-songwriter (born 1998)

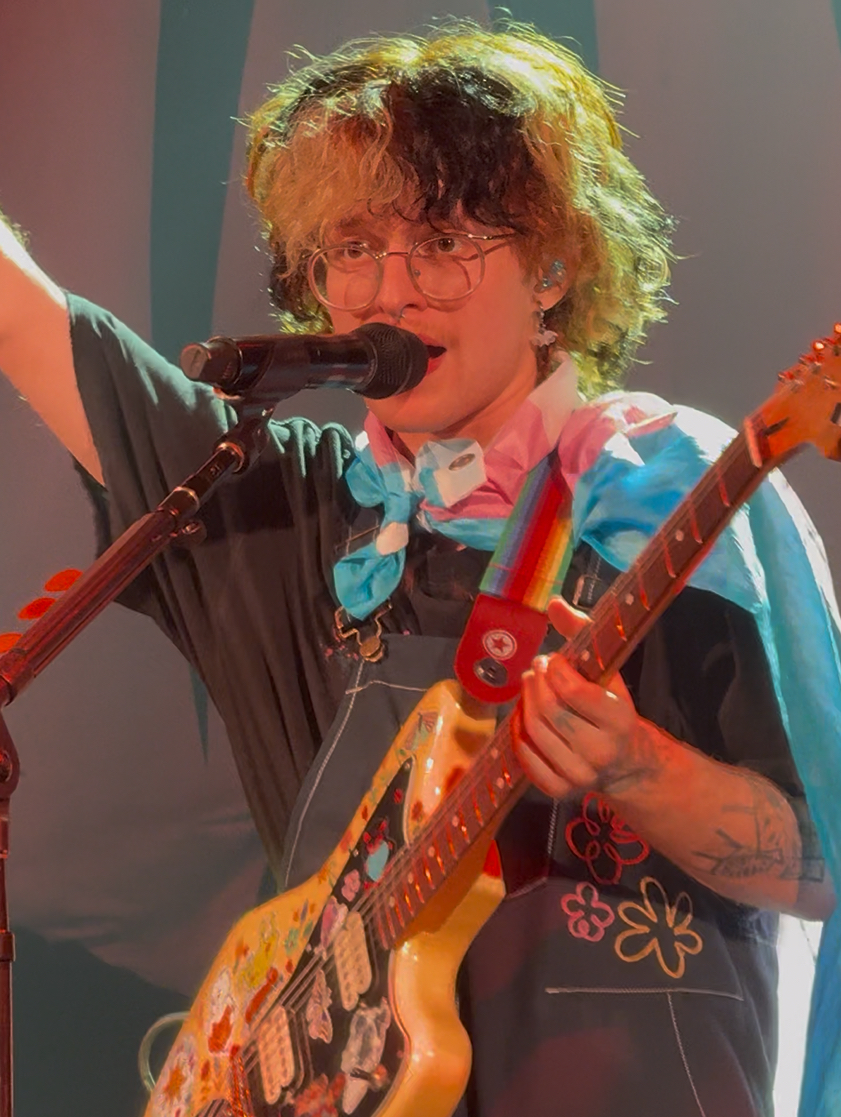
- Cavetown performing in 2025

Background information
- Also known as: brother
- Born: 15 December 1998 (age 27); Oxford, England
- Origin: Cambridge, England
- Genres: Indie pop; bedroom pop; indie rock; lo-fi; indie folk
- Occupations: Singer-songwriter; record producer; YouTuber
- Instruments: Vocals; ukulele; kazoo; guitar; melodica; keyboards
- Years active: 2012–present
- Labels: Sire; Triple Crown
- Website: cave.town

YouTube information
- Channel: Cavetown
- Genres: Music; vlogging
- Subscribers: 2.26 million
- Views: 649.412 million
- Last updated: 23 April 2026

Robin Daniel Skinner (born 15 December 1998), known professionally as Cavetown (sometimes stylised in all lowercase), is an English singer-songwriter, record producer, and YouTuber. His (Note: Skinner uses he/him and they/them pronouns. This article uses he/him for consistency.) style blends elements of indie rock, indie pop, and bedroom pop with mellow, gentle ukulele and guitar ballads.

As of April 2026, he had amassed over 7 million streams on Amazon Music and 4.6 million monthly streamers on Spotify. As of April 2026, his YouTube channel, which he began in November 2012, sits at 2.26 million subscribers and over 612 million video views. Skinner released his sixth studio album, Running with Scissors, in January 2026.

== Early life ==
Skinner was born in Oxford, England, on 15 December 1998. His interest in music was inspired by his father, David Skinner, a musicologist and choir director, who taught him how to play the acoustic guitar at the age of eight. His mother is a professional Baroque flautist and music teacher. He was raised in Cambridge and attended Parkside Community College from 2010 to 2015 and Hills Road Sixth Form College until 2017.

== Career ==
=== 2012–2015: YouTube and Bandcamp ===
Skinner began his YouTube channel in November 2012 and uploaded his first video, an original song named "Haunted Lullaby", in October 2013. Soon after, Skinner began releasing music to Bandcamp with his first album, Everything Is Made of Clouds, at the age of 14. He released Gd Vibes, Nervous Friends // Pt. 1, Balance (as brother) and Everything is Made of Stars on Bandcamp over the following two years. Critics expressed that he felt "the acceptance of ignorance" on Gd Vibes. Skinner released his debut single "This is Home" in August 2015, before releasing his debut self-titled album in November 2015. Critics described the album Cavetown as "an eclectic mix of acoustic and electronic". Skinner continued to publish covers of songs onto his YouTube channel from artists such as Pinegrove, Twenty One Pilots and Joji.

=== 2016–2018: 16/04/16 and Lemon Boy ===
In 2016, Skinner released his second studio album, 16/04/16. The album includes a mix of "warm, melodic bedroom pop" and "lo-fi indie rock". The album was dedicated to his childhood friend, Jack Graham, who died of leukaemia on the album's titular date. 60% of the album's proceeds were donated to Cancer Research UK.

In January 2018, he released his third album, Lemon Boy. In June later that year, he released the EP, Dear.

=== 2019–2021: Animal Kingdom, Sleepyhead and Man's Best Friend ===
Cavetown performing "Boys Will Be Bugs".

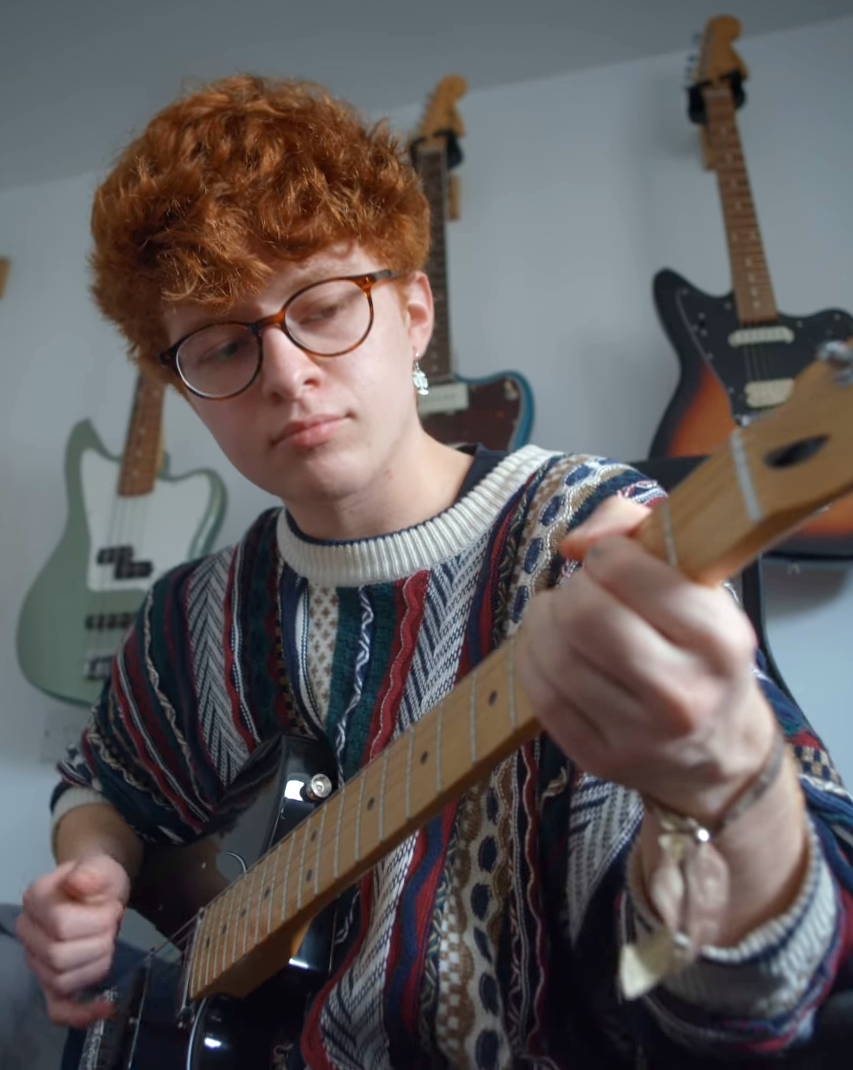
Cavetown in 2019

In 2019, Skinner released five split singles which were later compiled into Animal Kingdom, a mixtape of ten tracks including covers and original singles with guest appearances from Sidney Gish, Simi, and Chloe Moriondo.

He signed under Sire Records in 2019 where he released the single "Telescope" ahead of his upcoming album, later announced as Sleepyhead. That same year, he also released the concert album Live at Hoxton Hall.

Skinner embarked on a series of sold-out worldwide headlining tours in October 2019 in support of Sleepyhead. He was joined by Hunny and Mxmtoon for a few shows in the UK tour, as well as Field Medic and Chloe Moriondo for a few shows in the US tour. In October 2019, Skinner announced his headlining tour along Australia's east coast, which took place in January 2020, where he was accompanied by Spookyghostboy.

In 2020, Skinner released his major label debut album Sleepyhead. He cancelled the tour in support of Sleepyhead due to the COVID-19 pandemic in June 2020. In July 2020, Skinner collaborated with Tessa Violet on the single "Smoke Signals" and announced the launch of his unisex clothing line Cave Collective.

In 2021, he released the extended play Man's Best Friend. Sahar Ghadirian of Clash gave the EP a positive review, describing it as "wistfully compelling, providing comfort in a uniquely fuzzy way".

=== 2022–present: Worm Food, Little Vice and Running with Scissors ===
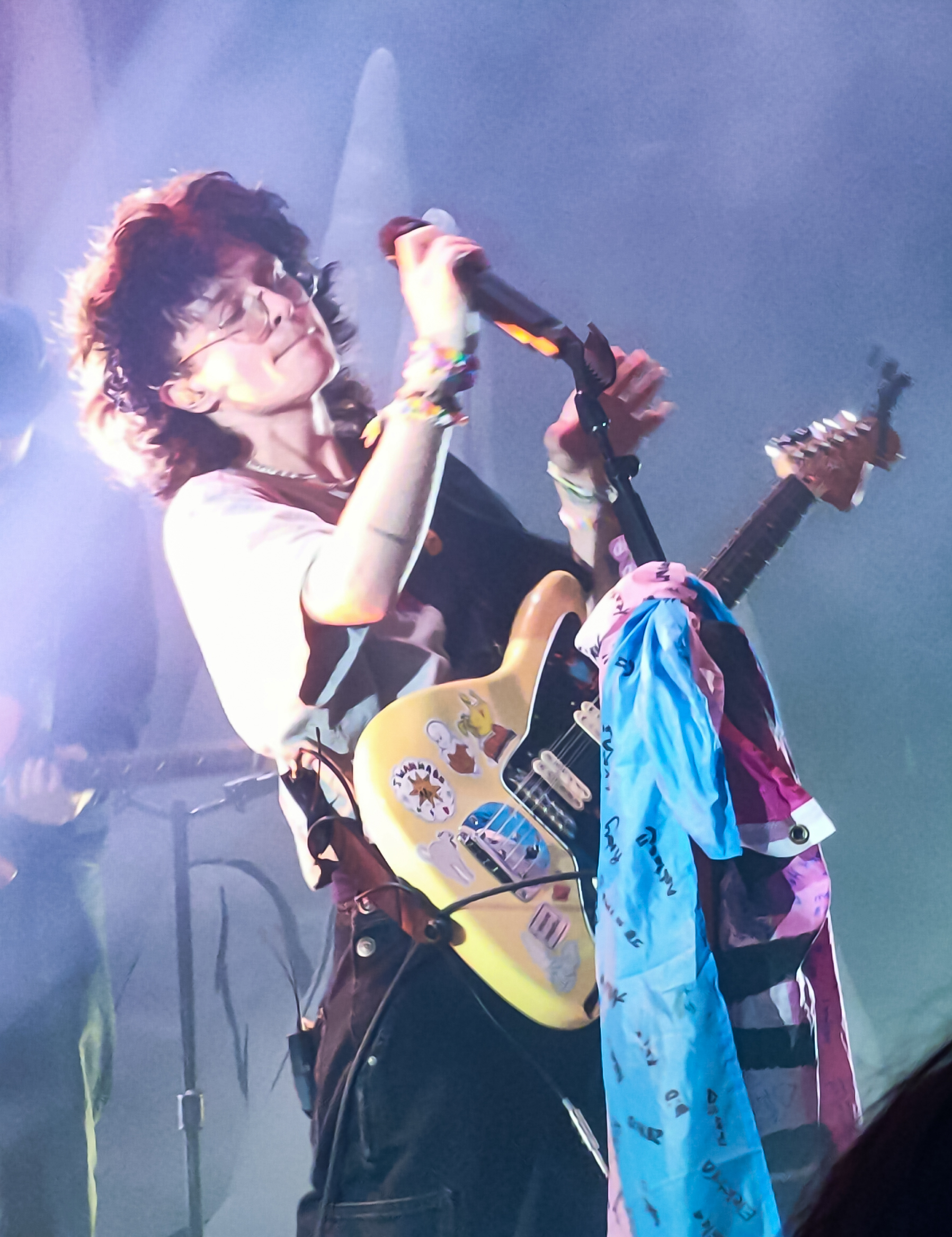
Cavetown performing in Melbourne in 2024

In 2022, Skinner released the album Worm Food to positive reviews from critics. Rachel Min Leong of Clash praised Worm Food for bringing "new depths" to Skinner's "disarming, raw sincerity". Similarly, Ali Shutler of NME wrote positively of Worm Food's "raw honesty, understanding and self-empowerment" and described the album as "[Skinner's] most fully-realised yet". Worm Food features guests such as Pierce the Veil, Beabadoobee, and Chloe Moriondo. Around the same time, Skinner announced the This Is Home Project, a foundation which will donate to various charities supporting young LGBT+ people.

In 2024, Skinner released the extended play Little Vice. In June 2024, he returned to Bandcamp to release a cover of "My Love Mine All Mine" by Mitski. Skinner later released multiple collaborative singles, including "magic 8 ball" with artist Frankie Cosmos, in advance of his 2024-2025 tour with Mother Mother. In December 2024, Skinner released an extended play consisting of lofi versions of some of his songs.

In March 2025, Skinner released an extended play of covers, including his previous cover of "My Love Mine All Mine", titled Songs I Like in 2025.

On 16 January 2026, Cavetown released his sixth studio album, Running with Scissors. He released several singles ("Baby Spoon", "Rainbow Gal", "Tarmac", and "NPC") from the album in the latter half of 2025, as well as "Sailboat" in January 2026 in collaboration with Chloe Moriondo. This was Skinner's first release with Futures Music Group, a joint venture between Neon Gold and Avenue A Records, which formed in 2024. The album's release is being followed by a world tour.

== Personal life ==
Skinner has stated that he is on both the aromantic and asexual spectrums. He came out as transgender in September 2020. His pronouns are he/they. Skinner lives in New York City with his girlfriend as of 2025. Skinner has ADHD.

== Discography ==
=== Studio albums ===
Title	Album details	Peak chart positions					
Title	Album details	UK	UK Indie	SCO	US Sales	US Heat	US Folk
Cavetown	Released: 9 November 2015; Label: Self-released; Format: Digital download, streaming, vinyl	—	—	—	—	—	—
16/04/16	Released: 15 August 2016; Label: Self-released; Format: Digital download, streaming, vinyl	—	—	—	—	—	—
Lemon Boy	Released: 1 January 2018; Label: Self-released; Format: CD, digital download, streaming, vinyl	—	—	—	—	—	—
Sleepyhead	Released: 27 March 2020; Label: Sire Records; Format: CD, cassette, digital download, streaming, vinyl	52	—	7	53	12	16
Worm Food	Released: 4 November 2022; Label: Sire Records; Format: CD, cassette, digital download, streaming, vinyl	39	—	8	86	—	—
Running with Scissors	Released: 16 January 2026; Label: Futures Music Group; Format: CD, cassette, digital download, streaming, vinyl	94	4	19	—	—	—
"—" denotes a recording that did not chart or was not released in that territory.

=== Extended plays ===
Title	Details	Peak chart positions	
Title	Details	UK Phys.	US Heat. ENC
Dear.	Released: 29 June 2018; Label: Triple Crown Records; Format: CD, digital download, streaming, vinyl	7	6
Man's Best Friend	Released: 4 June 2021; Label: Sire Records; Format: Digital download, streaming, vinyl	—	—
Little Vice	Released: 23 February 2024; Label: Sire Records; Format: Digital download, streaming, vinyl	—	—
SONGS I LIKE IN 2025	Released: 30 April 2025; Label: Self-released; Format: Digital Download, streaming, vinyl	—	—

=== Mixtapes ===
Title	Details
Animal Kingdom	Released: 12 April 2019; Label: Oat Milk; Formats: Digital download, streaming, CD, vinyl

=== Singles ===
==== As lead artist ====
List of other charted and certified songs
Title	Year	Peak chart positions				Certifications	Album
Title	Year	UK Phys.	UK Indie Brk.	JPN Over.	NZ Hot	Certifications	Album
"Devil Town"	2015	—	17	—	—	BPI: Silver; RIAA: Platinum; RMNZ: Gold	Cavetown
"This Is Home"	2015	—	—	—	—	BPI: Silver; RIAA: Platinum; RMNZ: Gold	Non-album single
"Lemon Boy"	2018	—	—	—	—	RIAA: Gold	Lemon Boy
"Just Add Water"	2018	—	—	—	—		Dear.
"Juliet"	2018	—	—	—	—	RIAA: Gold; RMNZ: Gold	Animal Kingdom: Sandy (Note: The full mixtape album Animal Kingdom was released in a series of 5 single sets over the space of 4 months, starting with Animal Kingdom: Sandy which was released on 28 November 2018 and ending with Animal Kingdom: Jackson which was released on 28 March 2019.)
"Boys Will Be Bugs"	2018	—	—	—	—	BPI: Silver; RIAA: Platinum; RMNZ: Gold	Animal Kingdom: Comet
"Advice"	2019	—	—	—	—		Animal Kingdom: Ash
"Self Control" (Frank Ocean cover)	2019	—	—	—	—		Animal Kingdom: Shells
"Hug All Ur Friends"	2019	—	—	—	—		Animal Kingdom: Jackson
"Home"	2019	35	—	—	—	RIAA: Gold	Non-album single
"Feb 14"	2019	—	—	—	—		Sleepyhead
"Telescope"	2019	—	—	—	—		Sleepyhead
"Things That Make It Warm"	2019	—	—	—	—		Sleepyhead
"You've Got a Friend in Me" (Randy Newman cover)	2019	—	—	—	—		Non-album single
"Sweet Tooth"	2020	—	—	—	—		Sleepyhead
"I Miss My Mum"	2020	—	—	—	—		Sleepyhead
"Smoke Signals" (featuring Tessa Violet)	2020	—	—	—	—		Non-album single
"Sharpener"	2020	—	—	—	—		Man's Best Friend
"Sharpener's Calling Me Again" (featuring Kina)	2021	—	—	—	—		Non-album single
"Paul" (Big Thief cover)	2021	—	—	—	—		Man's Best Friend
"Ur Gonna Wish U Believed Me"	2021	—	—	—	—		Man's Best Friend
"Teenage Dirtbag" (featuring Chloe Moriondo; Wheatus cover)	2021	—	—	—	—		Non-album single
"Squares"	2022	—	—	—	—		Squares / Y 13
"Y 13"	2022	—	—	—	—		Squares / Y 13
"Fall in Love with a Girl" (featuring Beabadoobee)	2022	—	—	—	—		Worm Food
"Fall in Love with a Girl" (featuring Orla Gartland)	2022	—	—	—	—		Non-album singles
"Grocery Store" (Note: "Trying Not to Cry", which was released in 2021 by Kina with Cavetown as a featured artist, was remixed and released by Cavetown (without Kina) under the title "Grocery Store" in 2022.)	2022	—	—	—	—		Non-album singles
"1994"	2022	—	—	—	—		Worm Food
"Frog"	2022	—	—	—	—		Worm Food
"Del Mar County Fair 2008" (Underscores cover)	2023	—	—	—	—		Non-album single
"Glacier Meadow" (featuring Field Medic)	2023	—	—	—	—		Little Vice
"Let Them Know They're on Your Mind"	2024	—	—	—	—		Little Vice
"Let Them Know They're on Your Mind" (acoustic)	2024	—	—	—	—		Little Vice
"Baby Spoon"	2025	—	—	—	—		Running with Scissors
"Rainbow Gal"	2025	—	—	—	—		Running with Scissors
"Tarmac"	2025	—	—	—	—		Running with Scissors
"NPC"	2025	—	—	7	—		Running with Scissors
"Sailboat" (featuring Chloe Moriondo)	2026	—	—	—	23		Running with Scissors
"—" denotes a recording that did not chart or was not released in that territory.

==== As featured artist ====
Year	Title	Album/EP
2018	"Devil Town" (with Kevin Devine)	Devinyl Splits No. 11
2020	"Is Your Bedroom Ceiling Bored?" (with Sody)	Non-album singles
2020	"Lemons" (with Brye)	Non-album singles
2020	"Was It Something I Said" (with Mykey)	Non-album singles
2021	"Struck by Lighting" (with Sara Kays)	Non-album singles
2021	"Trying Not to Cry" (with Kina)	Non-album singles
2024	"Didn't" (with Illuminati Hotties)	Power
2024	"Dirty Devil Town" (with Mother Mother)	Non-album singles

==== Other certified songs ====
Year	Title	Certifications	Album/EP
2018	"Fool"	RIAA: Platinum	Lemon Boy

=== Bandcamp releases ===
as Cavetown

- Everything Is Made of Clouds (2013)
- Gd Vibes (2014)
- Covers (2015)
- Youtube Covers (2015)
- Nervous Friends // Pt. 1 (2015)
- Everything Is Made of Stars (2015)

as brother

- balance (2015)
- not anywhere (alex g cover) (2018)
- bny rabit (2018)
- i want to meet your dog (2018)
- Hate (2019)

== Awards and nominations ==
Award Ceremony	Year	Nominated work	Category	Result	Ref.
Berlin Music Video Awards	2020	Green	Best Narrative	Nominated	
