= Keith Varon =

American singer-songwriter

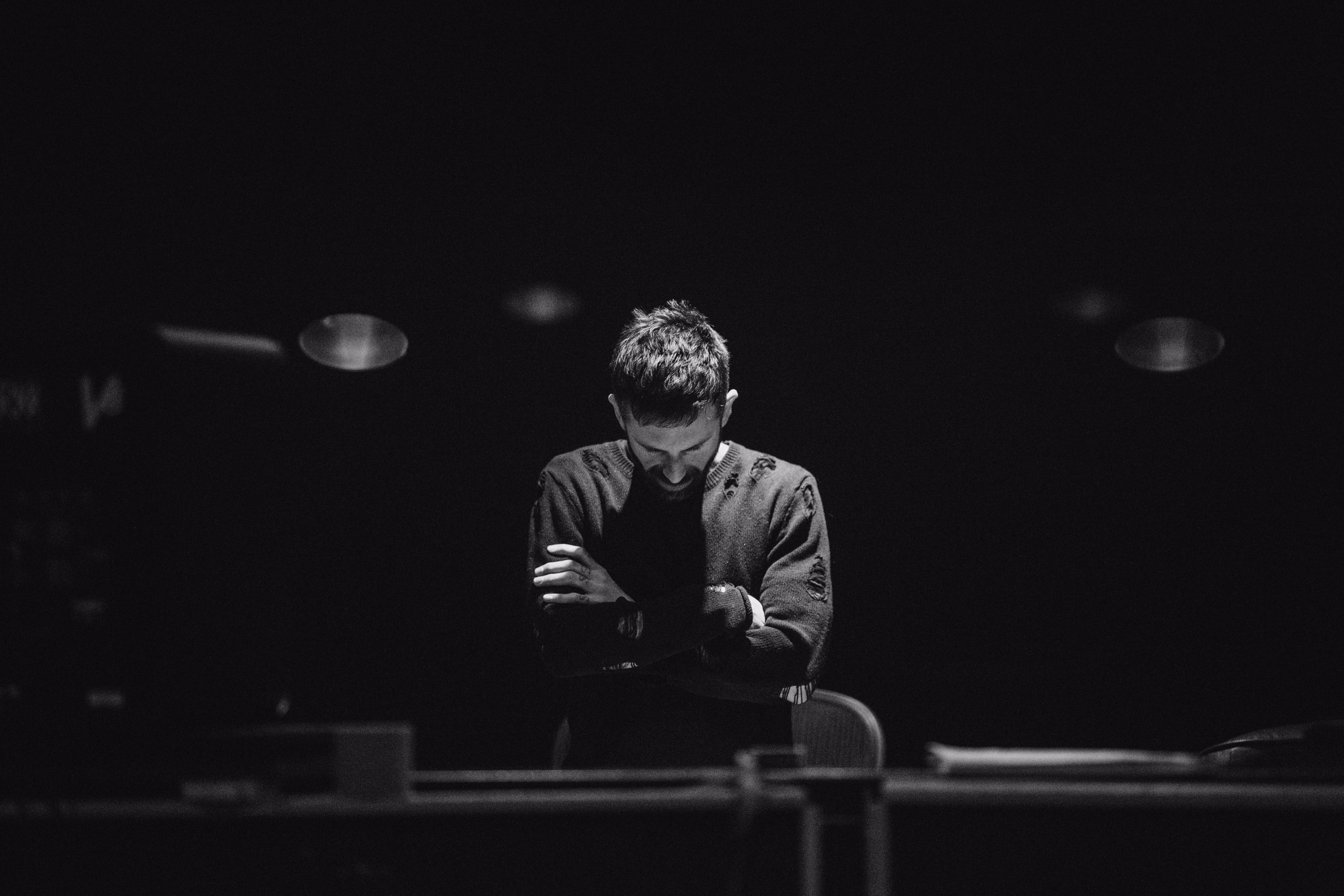

Background information
- Origin: San Francisco, California, United States
- Genres: Alternative, pop, electronic
- Occupations: Singer-songwriter, record producer
- Website: https://www.positionmusic.com/artist/NzM4Njc2LTM0YzY4Mw

Keith Varon is an American singer-songwriter, guitarist, and music producer from San Francisco, living in Los Angeles. Keith is signed to Position Music, and has been commercially releasing music over the past 10 years as a solo act and as a founding member in the band The Federal Empire.

As a songwriter/producer, Keith has written and produced songs on albums by The Aces, Taela, Lauren Sanderson, Joji, The Strumbellas, Chloe Moriondo, and Nightly. In the electronic world, he has written/produced songs with Martin Garrix, Sam Feldt, Steve Aoki, and Max Styler.

== Selected writing and production discography ==
Year	Title	Artist	Album	Role
2025	"Cyanide"	Huddy	Single	Producer, Writer
2025	"Twin Flame"	The Aces	Gold Star	Producer, Writer
2025	"obsessed"	Harvey Brittain	Single	Producer, Writer
2025	"What's A Girl To Do"	maryon king	Single	Producer, Writer
2024	"one day you're gone"	gavn!	Single	Producer, Writer
2024	"how to say goodbye"	lauren sanderson	fine ill get in my feelings	Producer, Writer
2024	"Fall Apart"	Will Swinton	Single	Executive Producer
2024	"good guys"	ANDI	Single	Producer, Writer
2024	"pull me under"	senses	Single	Executive Producer
2024	"one last time"	senses	Single	Executive Producer
2024	"can't find the words"	senses	Single	Executive Producer
2024	"gonna make sure"	senses	Single	Executive Producer
2024	"Paranoid"	Paris Shadows	Single	Producer, Writer
2023	I've Loved You For So Long	The Aces	I've Loved You For So Long	Executive Producer
2023	"not my problem"	Taela	life's a bitch... but it gets better	Executive Producer
2023	"bleachers"	Taela	life's a bitch... but it gets better	Executive Producer
2023	"i can't"	Taela	life's a bitch... but it gets better	Executive Producer
2023	"keep your demons"	Taela	life's a bitch... but it gets better	Executive Producer
2023	"full throttle"	Taela	life's a bitch... but it gets better	Executive Producer
2023	"Outta My League"	Chad Tepper	Never Stood A Chance	Producer, Writer
2023	"Running Out Of Time"	The Strumbellas	Single	Producer, Writer
2023	"Complicated"	Levi Evans	Single	Producer, Writer
2022	"Feeling Like The End"	Joji	Smitereens	Writer
2022	"Girls Make Me Wanna Die"	The Aces	I've Loved You For So Long	Producer, Writer
2022	"End Of My Life"	Kailee Morgue	Girl Next Door	Producer, Writer
2022	"Cheerleader"	Kailee Morgue	Girl Next Door	Producer, Writer
2022	"Is It Normal"	Lauren Sanderson	Death Of A Fantasy	Producer, Writer
2022	"Let Me Down"	Lauren Sanderson	Death Of A Fantasy	Producer, Writer
2022	"2005"	Story Of The Year	Tear Me To Pieces	Producer, Writer
2022	"Hate My Favorite Band"	Nightly	Single	Producer, Writer
2021	"Favorite Band"	Chloe Moriondo	Blood Bunny	Producer, Writer
2021	"Better"	Monsta X	The Dreaming	Producer, Writer
2021	"Bedoom Walls"	Lexi Jayde	a teenage diary	Producer, Writer
2021	"Wiped Out"	JUTES	Single	Producer, Writer
2021	"Riptide"	JUTES	Careful What You Wish For	Producer, Writer
2021	"In My Hands"	Zero 9:36, Travis Barker, CLEVER	...If You Don't Save Yourself	Producer, Writer
2020	"Angels & Demons"	jxdn	Single	Producer, Writer
2020	"Frustrated"	Lauren Sanderson	Midwest Kids Can Make It Big	Producer, Writer
2020	"the car"	Nightly	night, love you.	Producer, Writer
2020	"not like you"	Nightly	night, love you.	Producer, Writer
2020	"mess in my head"	Nightly	night, love you.	Producer
2020	"so sly"	Nightly	night, love you.	Producer
2020	"lose a friend"	Nightly	night, love you.	Producer, Writer
2020	"I got so much to tell you"	Nightly	night, love you.	Producer, Writer
2020	"Daydream"	The Aces	Single	Producer, Writer
2020	"U WANTED A FIGHT"	FEVER 333	Wrong Generation	Producer, Writer
2020	"Banyan Tree" (Interlude)	Machine Gun Kelly	Tickets to My Downfall	Producer
2020	"OK OK"	HOKO	Single	Producer
2020	"GIRL ON TV"	chloe moriondo	Single	Producer, Writer
2020	"Brand New"	Sheppard	Single	Producer, Writer
2019	"Chase The Summer"	Chantal Jeffries (feat. Jeremih)	Single	Producer, Writer
2018	"Isn’t You"	Shaylen	Single	Producer, Writer
2018	"Shut Em Up"	Lauren Sanderson	DON’T PANIC!	Producer, Writer
2018	"Better Anyway"	Lauren Sanderson	DON’T PANIC!	Producer, Writer
2018	"Ruin My Life (Steve James Remix)	Zara Larsson	Ruin My Life (Remixes)	Producer
2018	"Hooked on a Feeling"	Jacob Sartorius	Single	Producer, Writer
2018	"Feel It"	Max Styler	Single	Writer
2018	"Sleep Alone"	Max Styler (feat. Ella Boh)	Single	Producer, Writer
2018	"S.T.A.Y"	Nightly	’’The Sound of Your Voice’’	Producer, Writer
2017	"Promises"	Max Styler (feat. GOLDN)	Single	Producer, Writer
2017	"used to"	GOLDN	Single	Producer, Writer
2016	"Hold On & Believe"	Martin Garrix (feat. Federal Empire)	Seven	Writer
2016	"XO"	Nightly	Honest	Producer, Writer
2016	"Talk to Me"	Nightly	Honest	Producer
2016	"Honest"	Nightly	Honest	Producer, Writer
2016	"No Vacancy"	Nightly	Honest	Producer, Writer
2016	"Brave Enough"	Lindsey Stirling (feat. Christina Perri)	Brave Enough	Producer, Writer
