= Oyster (Chloe Moriondo album) =

Studio album by Chloe Moriondo
- Released: March 28, 2025
- Genre: Glitch pop; hyperpop
- Length: 36:51
- Label: Fueled By Ramen: Public Consumption; Atlantic
- Producer: Afterhrs; Aldn; Boon; Jacob Budgen; Jonny Coffer; Ines Dunn; Chloe Kraemer; Jonah Summerfield; Tomcbumpz

Chloe Moriondo chronology
Suckerpunch (2022)	Oyster (2025)

Singles from Oyster
- 1. "Shoreline" Released: January 14, 2025; 2. "Hate It" Released: February 19, 2025; 3. "Abyss" Released: March 6, 2025

Oyster is the fourth studio album by American singer-songwriter and YouTuber Chloe Moriondo. It was released on March 28, 2025, by Fueled By Ramen, Public Consumption Record Co. and Atlantic Music Group.

== Background ==
Succeeding Moriondo's 2022 project, Suckerpunch, and described as a breakup album, Oyster centers on the themes of love, heartbreak, grief and self-discovery. It incorporates elements of ballad, hyperpop, pop-punk and indie pop. Consisting of thirteen songs ranging between two and four minutes each, the album was produced by Jonah Summerfield, Chloe Kraemer, and AfterHrs (composed of Andrew Haas and Ian Franzino), and preceded by three singles titled "Hate It", "Shoreline" and "Abyss". The title was derived from Moriondo's early life when her father, at her mother's request, frequented a restaurant to buy oysters for a family meal.

== Reception ==
Professional ratings
Review scores
Source	Rating
DIY	4/5 stars
Clash	8/10 stars

DIY Magazine rated the album four stars and stated, "With Oyster, she takes another daring leap – this time into the depths of an oceanic, glitchy club world, resulting in a breakup album that is as ambitious as it is beautifully crafted." The Independent noted that "its floaty songs are the sort of soft, glitchy pop that I imagine mermaids might make." Clash Magazine rated it eight out of ten and remarked, "Overall, Oyster is a solid effort, showing Moriondo's maturing musicality. Whether you're going through a breakup or just trying to navigate your younger years, it's worth a listen."

== Track listing ==
Oyster track listing
No.	Title	Writer(s)	Producer(s)	Length
1.	"Catch"	Chloe Moriondo; Jonah Summerfield	Summerfield	2:24
2.	"Raw"	Moriondo; Summerfield	Summerfield	2:36
3.	"Hate It"	Moriondo; Ian Franzino; Andrew Haas; Steph Jones	Afterhrs	2:41
4.	"Abyss"	Moriondo; Edison Eason; David Fischer	Boon	2:09
5.	"Oyster"	Moriondo; Eason; Fischer; Alden Robinson	Aldn; Boon	3:00
6.	"Shoreline"	Moriondo; Chloe Kraemer	Kraemer	4:04
7.	"Parasite"	Moriondo; Jacob Budgen	Budgen	2:07
8.	"7Seas"	Moriondo; Kraemer	Kraemer	2:40
9.	"Weak"	Moriondo; Summerfield	Summerfield	2:55
10.	"Use"	Moriondo; Haas; Franzino; Lucy Healy	Afterhrs	3:20
11.	"Sinking"	Moriondo; Thomas Cartwright	Tomcbumpz	2:37
12.	"Pond"	Moriondo; Eason; Healy	Boon	3:36
13.	"Siren Calling"	Moriondo; Jonny Coffer; Ines Dunn	Coffer; Dunn	2:42
Total length:				36:51

Oyster deluxe track listing
No.	Title	Length
14.	"Teeth"
15.	"Girls with Gills"
