= Running with Scissors (Cavetown album) =

Studio album by Cavetown
- Released: 16 January 2026
- Genres: Hyperpop; bedroom pop; dream pop; pop-punk; alternative pop
- Length: 34:11
- Label: Futures
- Producers: Robin Skinner; Ryan Raines; David Pramik; Couros; Underscores

Cavetown chronology
Worm Food (2022)	Running with Scissors (2026)

Singles from Running with Scissors
- 1. "Baby Spoon" Released: 8 August 2025; 2. "Rainbow Gal" Released: 12 September 2025; 3. "Tarmac" Released: 10 October 2025; 4. "NPC" Released: 14 November 2025; 5. "Sailboat" Released: 2 January 2026

Running with Scissors is the sixth studio album by English singer-songwriter Cavetown. It was released on 16 January 2026 by Futures Music Group, his first full-length release with the label. After releasing his fifth album Worm Food in 2022, he wished to take a stylistic departure from his previous bedroom pop music and attract new followers while still retaining many of his older ones. Running with Scissors was the first album Cavetown produced with collaborators in a professional recording studio.

Described variously as a hyperpop, bedroom pop, dream pop, pop-punk, and alternative pop album, it primarily discusses themes of adolescence, self-discovery, anxiety, Cavetown's experiences as a trans man, and his romantic relationship. Upon its release, the album received mostly positive reviews from critics, welcoming his stylistic change. It charted at number 19 on the Scottish Albums Chart and in the top 100 on the UK Albums Chart, as well as placing on several other minor charts.

== Background and production ==
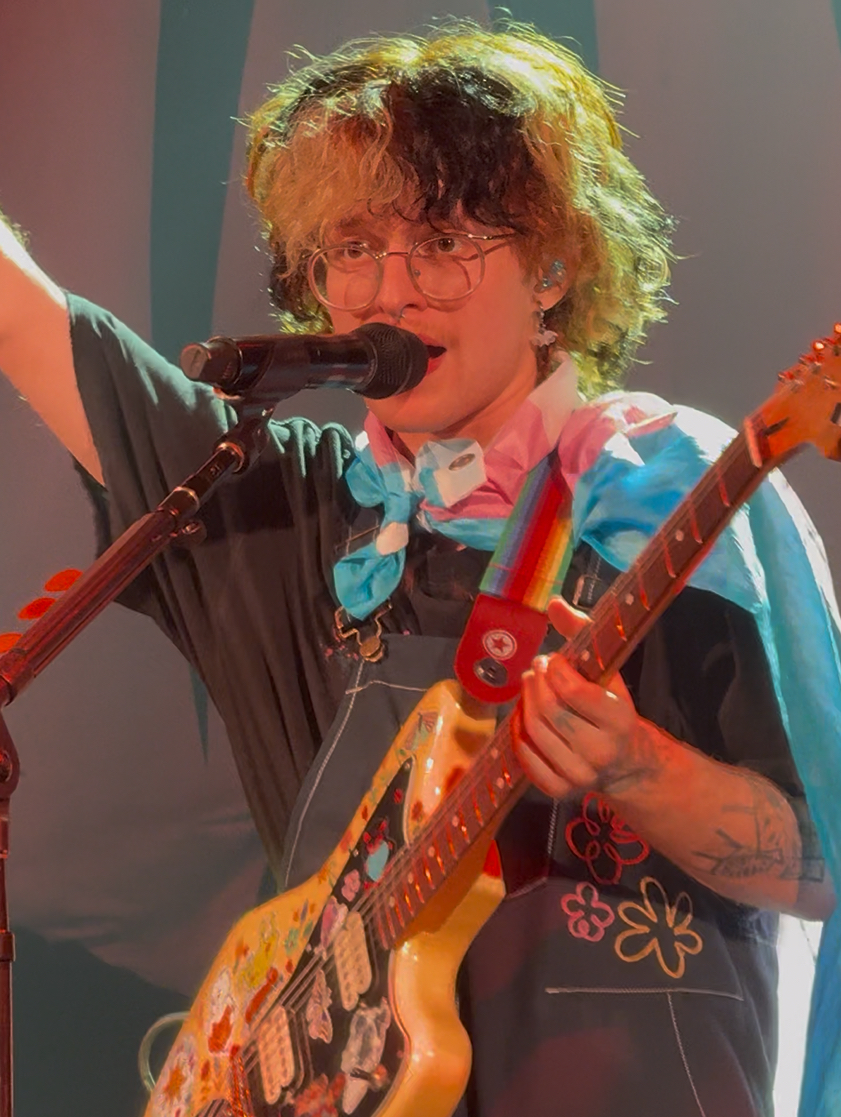
Cavetown performing in Moncton, Canada, in March 2025.

Cavetown released his fifth studio album Worm Food in 2022. The album received a weighted average score of 86 out of 100 at the review aggregator Metacritic, based on 4 reviews, indicating "universal acclaim". In an interview with The Line of Best Fit, Cavetown stated he wished to break away from his prior music, commonly described as bedroom pop, that he had a "love/hate relationship" with, believing it did not represent who he was now. He instead wished to maintain an equilibrium between his older works and his newer sound; attracting new followers while also appealing to his older ones.

Running with Scissors was the first record by Cavetown with external production and – unlike his previous music made in his bedroom – was recorded in a professional studio. After recording "Reaper", one of the first songs he made in the studio, he attempted to pivot back to his original style, but did not feel it was of the same quality. For the album, Cavetown drew influence from bands that he grew up listening to, primarily Pierce the Veil and Bring Me the Horizon, the former of which he had toured with before the album's release. He also took a lot of inspiration from hyperpop production and said he wished to create "very dry cuts that whiplash you a bit".

== Composition ==
=== Overview ===
Running With Scissors has been variously described as hyperpop, bedroom pop, dream pop, pop-punk, and alternative pop. The album was noted as a stylistic departure from his previous work. Travis Shosa of The Line of Best Fit and Harry Shaw of Dork both described Running with Scissors as Cavetown's more playful than his other works. Cavetown himself described the album's sound as "very maximalist, but not too much at the same time," a statement Shosa agreed with. Running With Scissors represents a perplexing adolescence; Cavetown stated in an interview that the album primarily revolves around his journey of self-discovery, primarily influenced by his upbringing and childhood. It also contains themes of anxiety, insecurity, and Cavetown's experiences as a trans man, as well as dealing with emotions about his family, masculinity, and love, and finding commonalities between childhood and adulthood.

=== Songs ===
The opening track of Running with Scissors, "Skip", begins with minimalistic acoustic guitar strings before intensifying to a psychedelic liquid drum and bass section compared to Animal Collective by Shosa. The song seamlessly transitions into "Cryptid", whose vocals are filtered through Auto-Tune, a style that was compared to Charli XCX by Emma Constance Harrison of Clash. The song itself was described as having fringe nu metal influences by Shaw. Its lyrics discuss Cavetown's experience as a trans man during a time of heightened backlash against LGBTQ people, particularly those who identify as transgender. "Rainbow Gal" consists of high-fidelity synthesizers and influences from bitpop, as well as a wide range of vocal filters; it was compared to the music of Porter Robinson by Shosa. The song itself is about Cavetown's girlfriend, who he had been dating for around three-and-a-half years at the time of the album's release.

The following track "Baby Spoon" was similarly inspired by his romantic relationship and contains themes of vulnerability and self-acceptance. It repeats in the chorus "It doesn't have to be so hard / Baby, take your t-shirt off" and contains the lyric "I wanna be your baby spoon", the latter of which was described by Shaw as "genuinely silly" but "charming". "NPC" is a pop-punk song with distorted vocals and heavy drums, inspired by an imaginary friend of Cavetown named Mr. Nobody. Succeeding it is "Reaper", a hyperpop track influenced by punk music with bouncy synthesizers and heavy vocals; the song ends in a crescendo of fuzzy and distorted guitar chords. The following "Straight Through My Head (Do It!!!)" took inspiration from Linkin Park and discusses Cavetown battling and overcoming negative thoughts.

"Tarmac" was the first song from Running with Scissors to be completed, and aims to represent a state of being overwhelmed and having a flow of intrusive thoughts. "No Bark No Bite" features sorrowful vocals layered atop soft acoustic guitars. It was described as being a "classic" Cavetown song by Harrison. The following track, "Micah", is dedicated to and named after his younger sister, who was born in 2025. Written prior to her birth, the song was initially intended to be a message to her, desiring to be a role model in her life; after reflecting on it, however, Cavetown felt that the song was more about the things he longed for in his childhood. "Sailboat", produced by Underscores, is a hyperpop and pop-punk track containing a guest appearance from frequent collaborator Chloe Moriondo, the album's only feature. The track represents vulnerability and a fear of hurting loved ones while aiming to protect them. "First Time" was inspired by a real-life experience Cavetown went through where, during his first drive in the United States, he was pulled over by a state trooper. The closing track of Running with Scissors is the title track, and is about learning to accept risk and overcoming fear.

== Release and promotion ==
Cavetown released the lead single for Running with Scissors, "Baby Spoon", on 8 August 2025. The single was the first release since signing to Futures Music Group, a collaboration between Neon Gold and Avenue A Records. On 12 September, coinciding with the release of the album's second single "Rainbow Gal", he announced Running with Scissors. "Tarmac", the third single from the album, was released on 10 October, and the fourth single "NPC" was released on 14 November. The fifth and final single from Running with Scissors, "Sailboat", was released on 2 January 2026. Running with Scissors was released on 16 January 2026 through Futures Music Group, alongside the music video for "Cryptid". The album's release was followed by a world tour, which began in February and concluded in April 2026.

== Critical reception ==
Professional ratings
Review scores
Source	Rating
Clash	8/10
Dork	4/5
Kerrang!	3/5
Record Collector	3/5 stars

Running with Scissors received mostly positive reviews from critics. Generally, they welcomed Cavetown's venture into a different sound comparative to his previous work. Harrison, writing for Clash, praised the album's lyrics and vocals and noticed a stylistic growth from his previous album. She also highlighted "Cryptid" as standing out from other tracks in the album. In a positive review for Dork, Shaw described the album as "bursting with ideas with positivity" and listed "NPC" as its highlight, calling it "dynamic, dramatic and catchy". Alice McIver, in an issue of Record Collector, highlighted the album's personal and honest themes as a positive. She described it as representing "a welcome extension of Cavetown's range." Rishi Shah of Kerrang! admired Cavetown's attempt at a change of sound, but felt that it was not taken far enough, describing "No Bark No Bite" and "Micah" as "sleepy" compared to the rest of the album.

== Track listing ==
Running with Scissors track listing
No.	Title	Writer(s)	Producer(s)	Length
1.	"Skip"	Robin Skinner; Ryan Raines	Skinner; Raines	2:33
2.	"Cryptid"	James Rapp; Skinner	Skinner; Raines	2:04
3.	"Rainbow Gal"	David Pramik; Skinner	Pramik; Skinner	2:22
4.	"Baby Spoon"	Couros; Skinner	Couros	2:59
5.	"NPC"	Skinner; Raines	Skinner; Raines	4:05
6.	"Reaper"	Pramik; Skinner	Pramik; Skinner	2:05
7.	"Straight Through My Head (Do It!!!)"	Skinner	Skinner	3:32
8.	"Tarmac"	Orla Gartland; Skinner	Skinner	3:10
9.	"No Bark No Bite"	Skinner	Skinner	1:28
10.	"Micah"	Couros; Skinner	Couros	3:02
11.	"Sailboat" (featuring Chloe Moriondo)	Skinner; Chloe Moriondo	Underscores	3:00
12.	"First Time"	Skinner	Skinner	1:21
13.	"Running with Scissors"	Skinner	Skinner	2:30
Total length:				34:11

== Personnel ==
Credits adapted from Tidal.

- Robin Skinner – production (1–3, 5–9, 12–13), songwriting
- Ryan Raines – production (1–2, 5), songwriting (1, 5)
- David Pramik – production (3, 6), songwriting (3, 6)
- Couros – production (4, 10), songwriting (4, 10)
- Underscores – production (11)
- James Rapp – songwriting (2)
- Orla Gartland – songwriting (8)
- Chloe Moriondo – songwriting (11)
- Dale Becker – audio mastering
- Allie Cuva – audio mixing
- Adam Burt – assistant audio mastering
- Katie Harvey – assistant audio mastering
- Noah McCorkle – assistant audio mastering

== Charts ==
Chart performances for Running with Scissors
Chart (2026)	Peak position
Scottish Albums (OCC)	19
UK Albums (OCC)	94
UK Albums Sales (OCC)	10
UK Albums Chart Update (OCC)	33
UK Independent Albums (OCC)	4
UK Physical Albums (OCC)	10
UK Record Store (OCC)	5
UK Vinyl Albums (OCC)	17
