= I've Loved You for So Long =

Studio album by The Aces
- Released: June 2, 2023
- Studios: Red Bull Studios, Santa Monica, California, United States
- Genre: Indie pop
- Length: 34:48
- Label: Red Bull
- Producers: The Aces; Keith Varon

The Aces chronology
| Under My Influence (2020) | I've Loved You for So Long (2023) | Gold Star Baby (2025) |

I've Loved You for So Long is the third studio album by American indie pop group The Aces, released through Red Bull on June 2, 2023. It has received positive reviews from critics, and has lyrical explorations of the band members' experiences of homophobia and racism among indie pop tunes.

== Composition ==
Apple Music said that the album draws from classic pop rock, in contrast to the R&B-influenced pop of their previous album, Under my Influence (2020). It is particularly inspired by 1980s pop rock.

== Reception ==
In Clash Magazine, Sara Hansen rated this release an 8 out of 10, calling it a "confident, self-assured album" that "provides a career snapshot". Adele Julia of The Line of Best Fit gave the release a 7 out of 10, writing that "the group appears most unified on this record, coming together with balanced production that leans into 80s synth sonics and 00s pop rock" and stating that the music alludes to "a brighter, and more authentic future" for the band. In Paste, Miranda Wollen praises the band for reinventing their sound, scoring I've Loved You for So Long an 8.6 out of 10, summing up that "it's an album meant for a summer playlist, and it's worth adding thereon".

== Track listing ==
All songs written by Katie Henderson, McKenna Petty, Alisa Ramirez, Cristal Ramirez, and Keith Varon.

1. "I've Loved You for So Long" – 2:56
2. "Girls Make Me Wanna Die" – 2:15
3. "Always Get This Way" – 2:54
4. "Solo" – 2:47
5. "Not the Same" – 4:14
6. "Suburban Blues" – 3:00
7. "Person" – 3:36
8. "Miserable" – 2:38
9. "Attention" – 2:49
10. "Stop Feeling" – 4:05
11. "Younger" – 2:10

The vinyl edition contains extended versions of "Always Get This Way" (3:10) and "Solo" (3:27)

== Personnel ==
The Aces

- Katie Henderson – lead guitar, vocals, piano, synthesizer, production
- McKenna Petty – bass guitar, vocals, production
- Alisa Ramirez – drums, vocals, production
- Cristal Ramirez – lead vocals, rhythm guitar, production

Additional personnel

- Julian Burgueño – photography
- Mike Crossey – programming, mixing
- Chris Gehringer – mastering
- James Musshorn – engineering
- Will Quinnell – mastering
- Aaron Stearns – cover art, design
- Keith Varon – guitar, synthesizer, programming, production, executive production
- Kenny "Tick" Salcido – A&R

== See also ==
- List of 2023 albums
