= When My Heart Felt Volcanic =

Studio album by The Aces
- Released: April 6, 2018
- Genre: Indie pop
- Length: 47:44
- Language: English
- Label: Red Bull
- Producer: The Aces; Mike Green; Josh Gudwin (vocals); Matt Jacobson (vocals); Dan Nigro; Simon Oscroft; Derrick Stockwell (vocals); Butch Walker; Wendy Wang; Greg Wells

The Aces chronology
I Don't Like Being Honest (2017)	When My Heart Felt Volcanic (2018)	Under My Influence (2020)

When My Heart Felt Volcanic is the debut full-length album by American indie pop group the Aces. It has received positive reviews from critics.

== Reception ==
When My Heart Felt Volcanic received positive reviews from critics noted at review aggregator Metacritic. It has a weighted average score of 75 out of 100, based on four reviews. Johnny Rogerson of Clash Magazine gave the album a 7 out of 10, stating that they have "escape[d] the indie clichés attached to pop bands using guitars, and have created a fully-fledged pop scorcher". In The Line of Best Fit, Pip Williams rated this release a 6 out of 10, calling it a "breezy, fun debut", but criticizing the band for not being more experimental with their sound. Writing for NME, Hannah Mylrea calls this album "sugar with substance" and rates it 4 out of 5 stars, writing that "Fake Nice" "could be one of the best pop songs of the year". NPR's Lyndsey McKenna writes in First Listen that the band has a similar sound to contemporary acts such as The 1975, Haim, and Paramore, but "here's a timelessness to the construction" of this album that makes it "a refined mission statement from a band with history" that is the kind of pop music "that's fit to be blasted from car stereos and sung along to at high volumes".

== Track listing ==
1. "Volcanic Love" (Daniel Gibson, Katie Henderson, Simon Oscroft, McKenna Petty, Alisa Ramirez, and Cristal Ramirez) – 3:25
2. "Stuck" (Gibson, Henderson, Oscroft, Petty, A. Ramirez, and C. Ramirez) – 4:05
3. "Fake Nice" (Henderson, Petty, A. Ramirez, C. Ramirez, and Wendy Wang) – 3:23
4. "Lovin’ Is Bible" (Gibson, Henderson, Oscroft, Petty, A. Ramirez, and C. Ramirez) – 3:20
5. "Just Like That" (Henderson, Petty, A. Ramirez, C. Ramirez, and Butch Walker) – 3:47
6. "Last One" (Frederik Berger, Henderson, Elof Loelv, Petty, A. Ramirez, and C. Ramirez) – 3:46
7. "Strong Enough" (Gibson, Henderson, Oscroft, Petty, A. Ramirez, and C. Ramirez) – 3:47
8. "Holiday" (Mike Green, Henderson, Petty, A. Ramirez, and C. Ramirez) – 3:49
9. "Stay" (Gibson, Henderson, Oscroft, Petty, A. Ramirez, and C. Ramirez) – 3:25
10. "Bad Love" (Henderson, Petty, A. Ramirez, C. Ramirez, and Greg Wells) – 3:05
11. "Put It on the Line" (Gibson, Henderson, Oscroft, Petty, A. Ramirez, and C. Ramirez) – 3:58
12. "Hurricane" (Josh Gudwin, Henderson, Petty, A. Ramirez, and C. Ramirez) – 3:37
13. "Waiting for You" (Henderson, Daniel Nigro, Petty, A. Ramirez, and C. Ramirez) – 4:17

Bonus track on vinyl edition

14. "Friends" (Demo) – 3:28

== Personnel ==
The Aces

- Katie Henderson – lead guitar, vocals, production on "Hurricane"
- McKenna Petty – bass guitar, vocals, production on "Hurricane"
- Alisa Ramirez – drums, vocals, production on "Hurricane"
- Cristal Ramirez – lead vocals, rhythm guitar, production on "Hurricane"

Additional personnel

- Zoux Bluestein – instrumentation, engineering
- Mike Crossey – mixing engineering
- Chris Gehringer – mastering
- Jonathan Gilmore – engineering assistance, mixing assistance
- Mike Green – engineering, production on "Holiday"
- Josh Gudwin – engineering, vocal production
- Matt Jacobson – engineering assistance, vocal production
- Ian MacGregor – engineering
- Dan Nigro – instrumentation, engineering, production on "Waiting for You"
- Simon Oscroft – engineering, production on "Volcanic Love", "Stuck", "Lovin' Is Bible", "Last One", "Strong Enough", "Stay", and "Put It on the Line"
- Will Quinnell – mastering
- Eric Stenman – mixing, mixing engineering
- Derrick Stockwell – engineering assistance, vocal production
- Todd Stopera – engineering
- Butch Walker – engineering, production on "Just Like That"
- Wendy Wang – instrumentation, engineering, production on "Fake Nice"
- Greg Wells – mixing engineering, production on "Bad Love"
- Kenny "Tick" Salcido - A&R

== See also ==
- List of 2018 albums
