= Gold Star Baby =

Studio album by the Aces
- Released: August 15, 2025
- Genre: Disco-pop
- Length: 33:38 (standard); 42:06 (After Hours edition)
- Label: The Aces Music

The Aces chronology
I've Loved You for So Long (2023)	Gold Star Baby (2025)

Gold Star Baby is the fourth studio album by the American indie pop band the Aces. It was released on August 15, 2025, under the band's own label The Aces Music.

A deluxe edition subtitled After Hours was announced in November 2025 and released in February 2026.

== Background and composition ==
Gold Star Baby and its release date were announced by the Aces on June 27, 2025. Upon the announcement of the album, several publications described it as a disco-pop record. (Note: Attributed to articles about the album written by Amber Bintliff of Melodic Magazine, Lex Hervoix of Stage Right Secrets, and Ben Pagani of Beyond the State Magazine.)

In an interview with People, lead singer Cristal Ramirez stated that she and her sister and band member Alisa Ramirez initially disagreed about which direction to take the album in, stating: "I remember fighting with Alisa about [the album's sound] because she was so sure about it early on. She's like, 'We need to write a disco record.' You're bugging me, I haven't even written three songs. Can I just write some music? I don't know what it's gonna be."

== Critical reception ==
Upon release, Gold Star Baby received positive acclaim from music critics. Mary Chiney of Beats per Minute gave the album a score of 81% and concluded her review by writing: "In a pop landscape crowded with singles engineered for the algorithm, Gold Star Baby feels like a night thrown for real people, in real rooms, with real heat in the air. You walk in as a listener; you walk out part of the story. Royvi Hernandez of Earmilk rated the album four out of five stars and wrote that it "takes the listener on a fun groovy dance getaway that makes you feel like your shining on the dance floor at a disco club and people are jealous as you’re walking in the room."

Georgia Jackson of The Soundboard, however, was mixed in her review of the album, writing that the Aces need to "push things further" for future releases, further elaborating: "[T]his attempt at an overarching narrative for a record is absolutely a move forward [for the band], but there feel like [sic] too many loose ends for it to be a real success. This record feels like a stepping stone for The Aces, but once they gain more confidence in their (already great) production skills and carry a concept through to the very end (maybe use more of their Spanish we get a tiny preview of on this record), then the gold star will truly be theirs."

== Track listing ==
Gold Star Baby track listing
No.	Title	Length
1.	"Welcome to Gold Star Baby"	1:06
2.	"Jealous"	2:25
3.	"The Magic"	3:43
4.	"Gold Star Baby"	2:45
5.	"You Got Me"	2:36
6.	"The Girls Interlude"	1:02
7.	"She Likes Me"	2:46
8.	"Stroke"	2:46
9.	"Twin Flame"	3:45
10.	"Fire in the Hole"	3:59
11.	"Spending the Night"	3:36
12.	"I'm Sweet (I'm Mean)"	3:09
Total length:		33:38

Gold Star Baby: After Hours bonus tracks
No.	Title	Length
13.	"Square One"	3:00
14.	"Can't Wait"	2:19
15.	"The Magic" (remix)	3:09
Total length:		42:06
