= Blood Bunny =

Studio album by Chloe Moriondo
- Released: May 7, 2021
- Length: 43:47
- Label: Fueled By Ramen
- Producer: Keith Varon; David Pramik; Peter Fenn; Pete Robertson; Jake Aron; Only Twin; John Paul Roney

Chloe Moriondo chronology
Spirit Orb (2020)	Blood Bunny (2021)	Blood Bunny (Acoustic) (2021)

Singles from Blood Bunny
- 1. "Manta Rays" Released: June 26, 2020; 2. "I Want To Be With You" Released: August 21, 2020; 3. "GIRL ON TV" Released: November 12, 2020; 4. "I Eat Boys" Released: April 1, 2021

Professional ratings
Aggregate scores
Source	Rating
Metacritic	82/100
Review scores
Source	Rating
Clash	7/10
DIY	4/5 stars
The Line of Best Fit	8/10
NME	4/5 stars
The New York Times	4/5 stars
The Observer	4/5 stars
Sputnikmusic	4.0/5

Blood Bunny is the second album by YouTuber and singer-songwriter Chloe Moriondo, released on May 7, 2021. Although many songs include co-writers, Moriondo is featured as a writer on every song on the album. "Manta Rays", "I Want To Be With You", "GIRL ON TV", and "I Eat Boys" were released as singles from the album. On June 10, 2022, Moriondo released Blood Bunny (Deluxe), a deluxe version of the album, including fan favorite song "Hell Hounds" and a new collaboration with dodie (singer) in "I Eat Boys (feat. dodie)." The track "Hell Hounds" was later also released with the singer-songwriter's third album SUCKERPUNCH.

== Track listing ==
Blood Bunny track listing
No.	Title	Writer(s)	Producer(s)	Length
1.	"Rly Don't Care"	Chloe Moriondo; Peter Fenn	Peter Fenn	2:25
2.	"I Eat Boys"	Moriondo; David Pramik; Steph Jones	David Pramik	2:42
3.	"Manta Rays"	Moriondo	Pete Robinson	3:31
4.	"GIRL ON TV"	Moriondo; Keith Varon; Stephen Wrabel	Keith Varon	3:12
5.	"I Want To Be With You"	Moriondo; Pramik	Pramik	2:59
6.	"Slacker"	Moriondo; Charli Adams; Jake Aron	Jake Aron	4:23
7.	"Take Your Time"	Moriondo; Pramik; Charlie Snyder	Pramik	2:21
8.	"Bodybag"	Moriondo; Pramik; Jones	Pramik	2:38
9.	"Favorite Band"	Moriondo; Varon; Adams	Varon	3:41
10.	"Samantha"	Moriondo; Pete Robertson	Robertson	3:34
11.	"Strawberry Blonde"	Moriondo; Robertson	Robertson	3:47
12.	"Vapor"	Moriondo; John Paul Roney	John Paul Roney and Only Twin	4:44
13.	"What If It Doesn't End Well"	Moriondo; Pramik; Jones	Pramik	3:41
Total length:				43:47

Blood Bunny (Deluxe)
No.	Title	Writer(s)	Producer(s)	Length
14.	"I Eat Boys (feat. dodie)"	Chloe Moriondo; David Pramik; Steph Jones	David Pramik	2:44
15.	"Living Virtually"	Moriondo	-	3:03
16.	"Slacker - Cavetown Version"	Charli Adams; Moriondo; Jake Aron	Robin Skinner	4:24
17.	"Girl on TV - Voice Memo"	Moriondo; Keith Varon; Stephen Wrabel	Keith Varon	3:57
18.	"Favorite Band - Voice Memo"	Moriondo; Varon; Adams	Varon	4:50
19.	"Strawberry Blonde - Voice Memo"	Moriondo; Pete Robertson	Pete Robertson	3:19
20.	"I Want To Be With You - Acoustic"	Moriondo; Pramik	Robin Skinner	2:57
21.	"Manta Rays - Acoustic"	Moriondo	Robin Skinner	3:51
22.	"Girl on TV - Acoustic"	Moriondo; Varon; Wrabel	Robin Skinner	3:29
23.	"Take Your Time - Acoustic"	Charlie Snyder; Moriondo; Pramik	Robin Skinner	2:21
24.	"Hell Hounds"	Moriondo	-	2:01
Total length:				80:00

Notes

- Girl on TV titles are stylized in all uppercase.
- The titles of track 20-23 are stylized in all lowercase.
- The album cover and related artworks were created by Vewn (Victoria Vincent)
