= The Birth of a Nation: The Inspired By Album =

Soundtrack album by Various artists
- Released: September 30, 2016
- Genre: Hip hop, R&B, Pop
- Length: 56:41
- Label: Atlantic Records
- Producer: Nate Parker (album producer); Craig Kallman (album producer); Kevin Weaver (album producer); Lanre Gaba (album co-producer); Danielle Diego (Executive album producer); David Pramik; Jesse "Corparal" Wilson; Wheezy; DJ Frank E; Sir the Baptist; Royal Z; Greg Cohen; Elliot "STROUD" Stroud; Tearse "Kizzo" Persons (co.); DJ Money; Kamau Agyeman; Joe Pascoe; Brandon Black; Toby Gad; Deputy; Ely Rise (co.)

The Birth of a Nation: The Inspired by Album is the companion album to the 2016 movie The Birth of a Nation. It was released on Atlantic Records on September 30, 2016, one week prior to the film's theatrical release.

== Background ==
The album was curated by the film's star and director Nate Parker, Atlantic Records CEO Craig Kallman, and Atlantic Records President of Film & Television Kevin Weaver as a platform for lyrical content inspired by the film's protagonist Nat Turner, an enslaved preacher from Virginia who led a rebellion against slave owners. It features a number of prominent R&B and Hip-Hop artists, including Vic Mensa, Nas, Wale, The Game, K. Michelle, Ne-Yo, Pusha T, Gucci Mane, 2 Chainz, Lil Wayne, Meek Mill, and Lecrae.

== Track listing ==
- credits adapted from the album's digital booklet.

No.	Title	Writer(s)	Producer(s)	Length
1.	"Go Tell ‘Em" (Vic Mensa)	Vic Mensa; David Andrew Pramik; Mike Eyal Aljadeff; Brice Fox	David Pramik; Michael Jade (add.)	2:59
2.	"Black Moses" (Meek Mill and Pusha T featuring Priscilla Renea)	Jesse "Corparal" Wilson; Robert Williams; Terrence Thornton; Priscilla Hamilton	Jesse "Corparal" Wilson	4:03
3.	"Whip & a Chain" (2 Chainz)	Wilson; Jason York; Tauheed Epps	Corparal	3:21
4.	"Oh Lord" (Gucci Mane and Lil Wayne)	Radric Davis; Dwayne Carter; Wesley Glass	Wheezy	3:00
5.	"On My Own" (Lecrae and Leon Bridges)	Lecrae; John Mitchell; Breyan Isaac; Danny Majic; Justin Franks	DJ Frank E; Danny Majic (add.)	3:33
6.	"Raise Hell" (Sir the Baptist featuring Killer Mike and Churchpeople)	William James Stokes; Jaberi Rayford; Bryan Stovall; Rob L. Woolridge, Jr.	Sir the Baptist	3:41
7.	"Bloodline" (Georgia Ku)	Natalie Hinds; Adam "Royal Z" Waldman; Georgia Ku; Thomas Lumkins; Kelly Lumkins	Royal Z	4:12
8.	"Stand" (Trey Songz)	Greg Cohen; Henry Jackman; Elliot Stroud; Jirou Williams	Greg Cohen; Elliot "STROUD" Stroud	3:23
9.	"Queen" (Ne-Yo)	Shaffer Smith; Wilson; Tearce "Kizzo" Persons	Corparal; Tearce "Kizzo" Persons (add.)	3:24
10.	"Live Forever" (Wale and Anthony Hamilton)	Olubowale Akintimehn; Z. Young; Phil Ade	DJ Money	3:25
11.	"The Icarus" (Kamau)	K. Agyeman	Kamau Agyeman; Joe Pascoe; Brandon Black; Mo Kheir	3:25
12.	"Sins of Our Fathers" (The Game and Marsha Ambrosius)	Wilson; Jayceon Taylor; Marsha Ambrosius	Corparal	3:43
13.	"Firebird" (Marko Penn and Janine)	Toby Gad; Titus "Marko Penn" Stubblefield	Toby Gad	3:49
14.	"Forward" (K. Michelle)	Waldman; Jason "Poo Bear" Boyd; Sam Barsh; Georgia Ku	Royal Z	3:57
15.	"War" (Nas featuring RAYE)	Jamil Pierre; Nasir Jones	Deputy	3:54
16.	"Couldn’t Hear Nobody Pray" (Wiley College Choir)			5:17
Total length:				59:17
