= Frances Forever =

American singer-songwriter

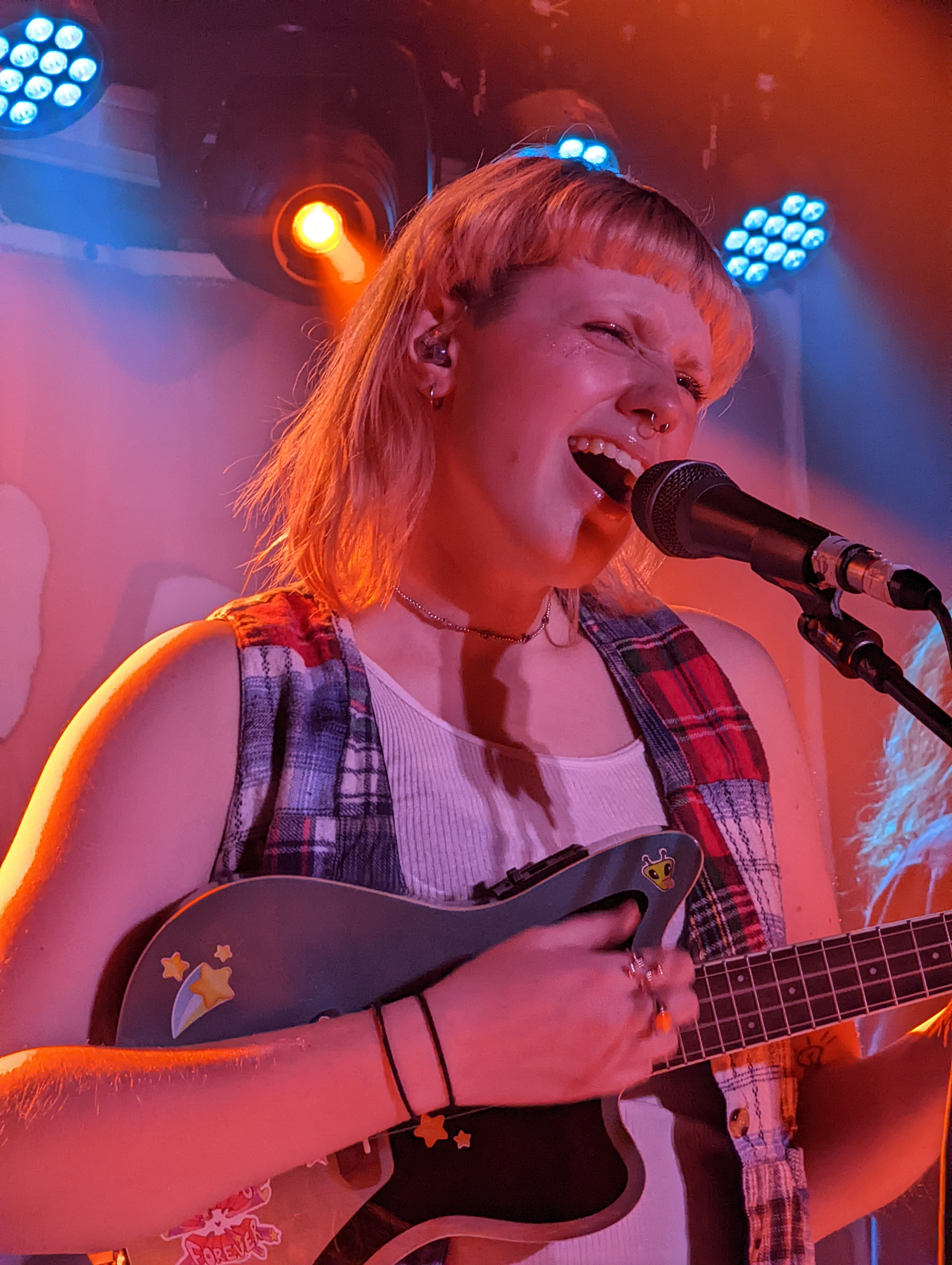
- Garrett in 2022

Background information
- Born: Frances Elizabeth Garrett; June 17, 1999 (age 27)
- Genres: Bedroom pop; Indie pop
- Instruments: Vocals; piano; guitar
- Years active: 2018–present
- Label: Mom+Pop

Frances Elizabeth Garrett (born June 17, 1999), known professionally as Frances Forever, is an American singer-songwriter. They are best known for their song "Space Girl", which became a viral hit on TikTok in 2020.

== Early life ==
Frances Garrett grew up outside of Baltimore and was homeschooled as a child. They started playing piano at six years old and began writing songs as a teenager. A summer intensive at Berklee College of Music convinced them to pursue music professionally. They chose the stage name "Frances Forever" as a play on their first name and as an homage to the song "Francis Forever" by Mitski.

== Career ==
Garrett began their career with the release of their first EP Pockets in 2018. The EP featured songs written on single instruments that represent "pockets" of Garrett's life. They later submitted their song "Space Girl" as an entry to be on NPR's Tiny Desk Concerts series. Though the entry was not chosen, Boston's WBUR-FM selected the song as their favorite submission from Massachusetts, calling Garrett's songwriting "reminiscent of the smart bedroom pop of peers like Sidney Gish and Clairo, cheerful-sounding ditties that belie more complicated emotions: sadness, longing, resentment". Garrett also went on to perform a headlining slot at WBUR's CityScape event on August 23, 2019.

"Space Girl" was officially released as a single on March 27, 2020, and became a viral hit through TikTok, garnering over 10 million streams on streaming services. In December 2020, the song debuted at number 23 on the Billboard Hot Alternative Songs chart. On December 16, 2020, Garrett was officially signed to Mom + Pop Music. A remix of "Space Girl" featuring Chloe Moriondo was released on January 29, 2021. A music video for the song was released on March 3, 2021, followed by the release of their second EP Paranoia Party on July 9, 2021. In an August 2021 Dork interview, Garrett cited Taylor Swift as their musical inspiration, and that they grew up with Swift's music.

On June 28, 2024, Garrett released their debut album, Lockjaw.

== Personal life ==
Garrett is bisexual and non-binary and uses singular they pronouns. They were diagnosed with ADHD as an adult. In 2021, Garrett earned a degree in music and music technology from Clark University.

== Discography ==
=== Albums ===
Title	Details
Lockjaw	Released: June 28, 2024; Label: Mom + Pop

=== Extended plays ===
Title	Details
Pockets	Released: November 16, 2018; Label: Self-released; Format: Digital download, streaming
Paranoia Party	Released: July 9, 2021; Label: Mom + Pop; Format: Vinyl, CD, digital download, streaming

=== Singles ===
==== As lead artist ====
Title	Year	Peak chart positions		Album
Title	Year	US Alt	US Rock	Album
"Frankenstein Wannabe"	2019	―	―	Non-album single
"Slow Down!" (with Matty Sun)	2019	―	―	Non-album single
"Space Girl" (solo or featuring Chloe Moriondo)	2020	23	27	Paranoia Party
"Paranoia Party"	2021	–	–	Paranoia Party
"Certified Fool"	2021	–	–	TBA

==== As featured artist ====
Title	Year	Album/EP	Ref.
"Could This Be Us" (Ash Always featuring Frances Forever)	2018	Non-album single	
"Get Through" (Simon Safran featuring Frances Forever)	2020	EP	
