= The Aces (indie pop band) =

American indie pop band

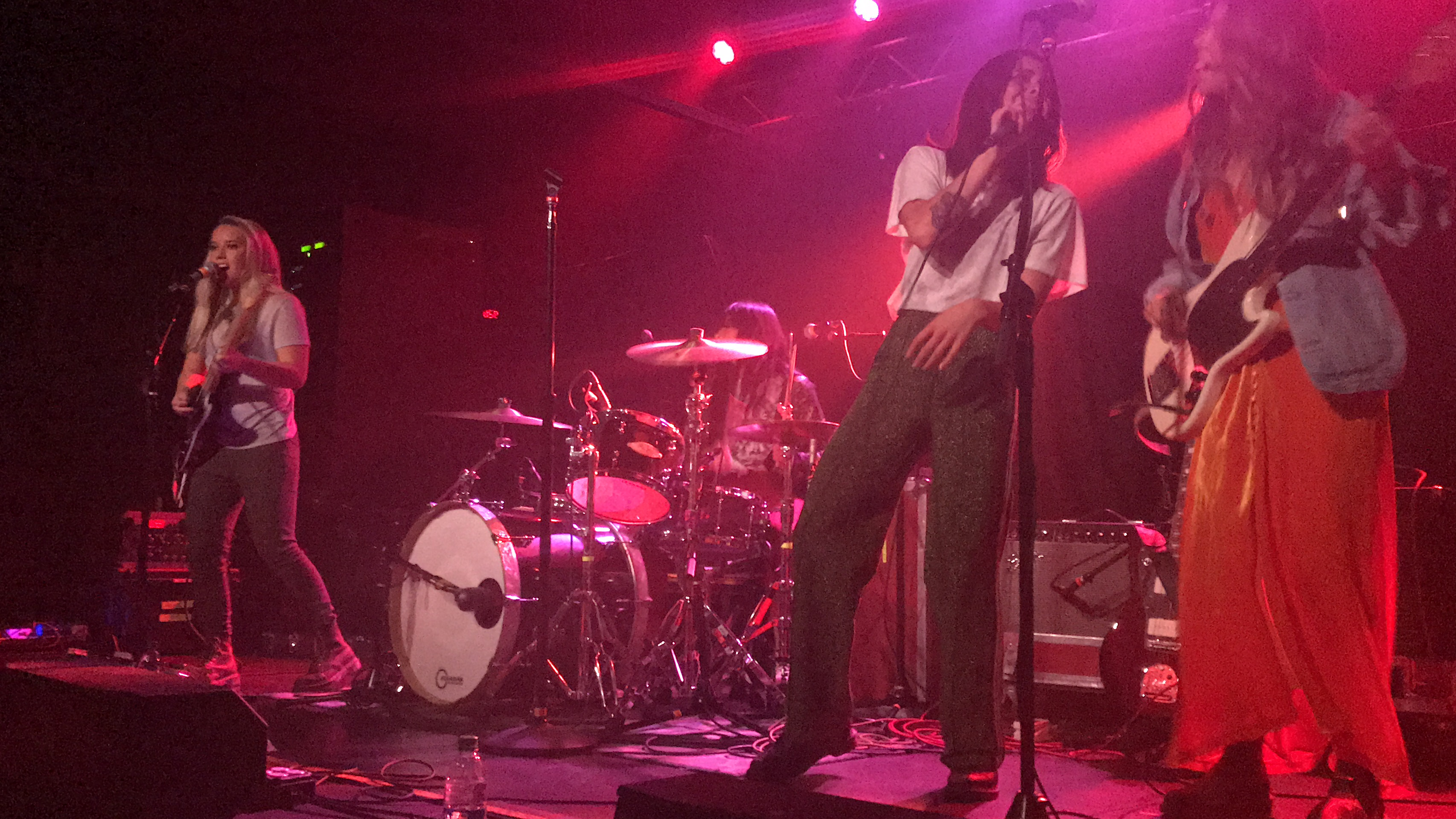
- The Aces performing at Brighton Music Hall in Boston, Massachusetts, in 2017

Background information
- Origin: Provo, Utah, U.S.
- Genres: Indie pop; new wave; synth-pop; alternative rock
- Years active: 2016–present
- Label: Red Bull
- Members: Katie Henderson; McKenna Petty; Alisa Ramirez; Cristal Ramirez
- Website: theacesofficial.com

The Aces (formerly The Blue Aces) are an American alternative pop band from Provo, Utah. The band has four members: guitarist Katie Henderson, bassist McKenna Petty, and sisters Alisa Ramirez (drums) and Cristal Ramirez (lead vocals and guitars).

Their first single as the Aces, "Stuck", was released in 2016, eventually reaching #38 on the Billboard Alternative Songs chart in late 2017. The band's second single, "Physical", was released in 2017 in advance of their debut EP, I Don't Like Being Honest. The band was signed to Red Bull Records. The band's debut album, When My Heart Felt Volcanic, was released on April 6, 2018. The Aces worked with six producers on the records, but Dan Gibson and Simon Oscroft were particularly influential, being involved in half of the material.

The Aces joined 5 Seconds of Summer for their Meet You There Tour. Following this tour, they embarked on their own North American headlining tour in support of When My Heart Felt Volcanic, the Waiting For You Tour.

== Career ==
=== Origin ===
The Aces began when sisters Cristal and Alisa Ramirez were ten and eight years old respectively. Although neither sister recalls exactly when their musical career visions began, the Ramirez sisters were raised in a music-loving household where their father would dance salsa with them and their mother played 1980s pop artists like Whitney Houston and Michael Jackson, as well as older brother playing in many prominent Provo/SLC hardcore punk bands. With a piqued interest, they began to jam out while studying and taking notes from their favorite bands on YouTube.

One Christmas season, the sisters asked their best friend, McKenna Petty, to ask for a bass for Christmas. Soon after, the trio, all self-taught, formed the Blue Aces. They began to jam and experiment in their neighbor's garage. In 2008 the band was officially formed when Petty's friend, Katie Henderson, joined the group. Collectively, the Aces began to sharpen their talents and get their raw exposure throughout high school while performing locally at venues and bars. Over the years, as they expanded their presence within their local music scene they were listed on the “Top 10 Best Bands in Provo” by Provo Buzz and “10 Best Utah Bands You Should Know” by Paste Magazine. In 2014, the girls decided to professionally pursue a musical career after watching 18-year-old Lorde win her first Grammy.

With no industry ties, the girls began their hunt for professional connections first starting by working with accomplished producers. Particularly the key to buzz surrounding them, record labels soon came calling for them. In 2016, Red Bull Records signed them. The band was signed by A&R executive Kenny "Tick" Salcido.

=== As the Blue Aces (2012–2014) ===
Katie Henderson, McKenna Petty, Alisa Ramirez, and Cristal Ramirez started as the Blue Aces in 2012. They released two EPs as the Blue Aces before they changed their name to the Aces.

=== I Don't Like Being Honest (2014–2017) ===
In 2016, they wrote two songs independently: "Volcanic Love" and "Stuck". Soon after, the Aces were signed with Red Bull Records and the band embarked on songwriting and recording sessions.

On June 23, 2017, the band's debut EP (under the new name), I Don't Like Being Honest, was released. Their debut single, "Stuck", reached No. 38 on the Billboard Alternative Songs chart. During SXSW they performed at Nylon, Noisey, Rachael Ray's Feedback House, and Quantum Collective's SX Invasion. For the rest of 2017, the Aces found themselves sharing the stage with alternative bands such as Joywave and Portugal. The Man.

=== When My Heart Felt Volcanic (2018–2019) ===
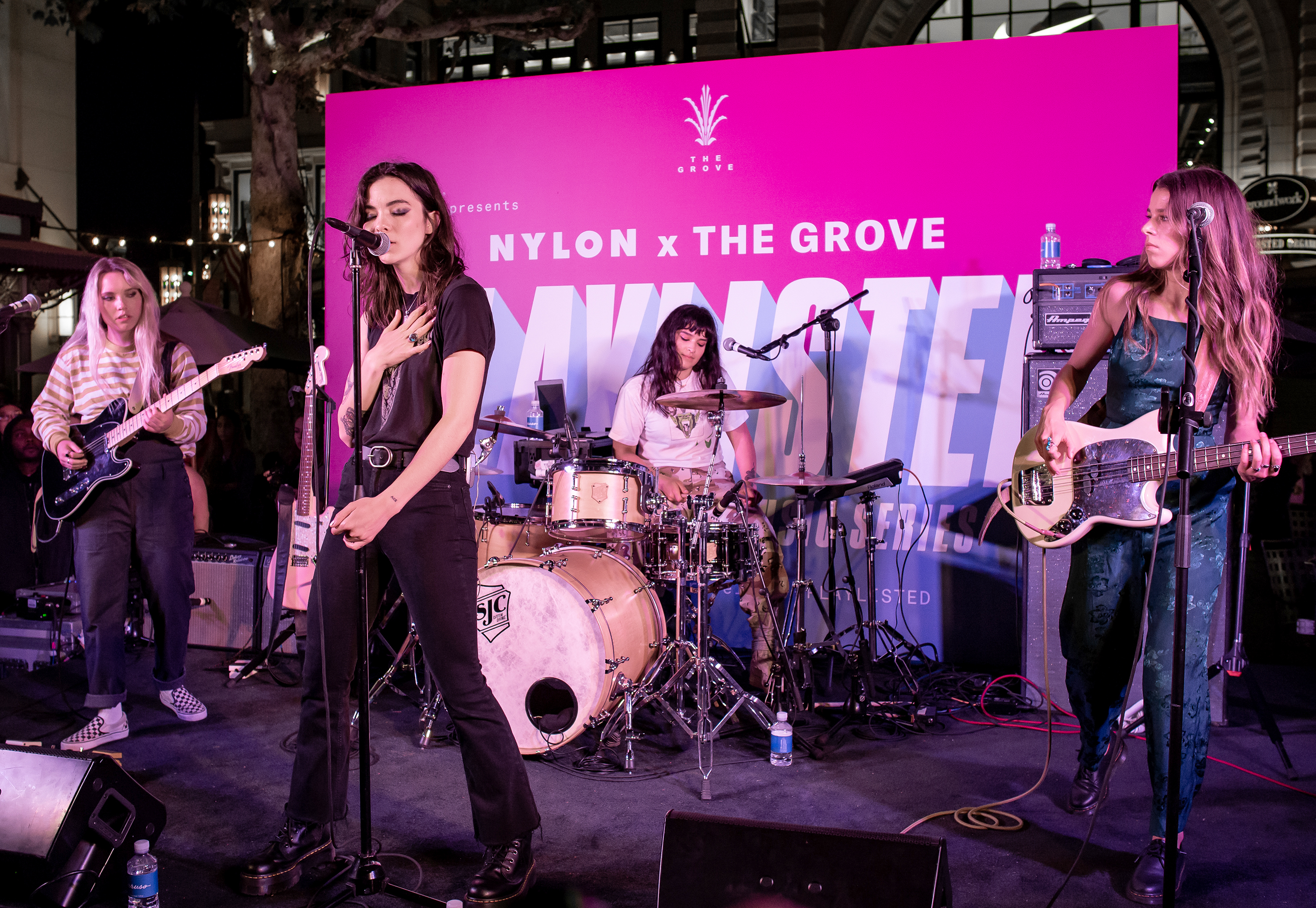
The Aces in 2018

Early February 2018, the Aces teased their upcoming debut album. To celebrate, they announced their tour with indie pop band, Coin. Two months later, on April 6, 2018, the Aces released When My Heart Felt Volcanic. On May 16, 2018, The band performed on Seth Meyer's Late Night Show. Their song “Strong Enough” was featured on the soundtrack of NBA 2K20.

The Aces were announced as the opening act for 5 Seconds of Summer's Meet You There World Tour. Subsequently, they announced their first ever headlining tours in the US and Europe, When My Heart Felt Volcanic, the Waiting For You Tour. They played festival stages and larger venues for the rest of 2018 and early 2019.

=== Under My Influence (2020–2022) ===
On March 4, 2020, the Aces released their first single of their second LP, titled "Daydream". A music video for the song was released on March 24, 2020.

On April 6, 2020, the second single was released, titled "Lost Angeles". On May 6, 2020, the Aces revealed the title and track listing of the album, Under My Influence, along with the release of a third single, "My Phone is Trying to Kill Me".

Their fourth single from Under My Influence, "Kelly" was released on June 1, 2020. "Kelly," which is explicitly queer, is the first of the band's songs to use gendered pronouns. Cristal and Alisa Ramirez commented that while they had not been consciously avoiding gendered pronouns, the band, in which three of four members are queer, had previously not been ready to "step into that space [...] as artists."

Under My Influence was originally slated for release on June 12, 2020. However, on June 7, the band announced that the album would be delayed in response to the George Floyd protests. The band's official website revealed the new release date as July 17, 2020.

=== I've Loved You for So Long (2023–2024) ===
On June 8, 2022, The Aces released the first single from their third LP, titled "Girls Make Me Wanna Die". The official music video was released on June 29, 2022

On February 17, 2023, the second single was released, titled "Always Get This Way". The Album, I've Loved You For So Long, was officially announced on February 21, 2023.

On March 31, 2023, The third single was released, titled "Solo". The 4th single and title track, "I've Loved You For So Long" was released on April 28, 2023.

On June 2, 2023, the Aces released their third LP, titled I've Loved You for So Long.

=== Gold Star Baby (2025-present) ===
On August 15, 2025, the Aces released their fourth studio album Gold Star Baby.

== Band members ==
The Aces consists of Katie Henderson, McKenna Petty, Alisa Ramirez, and Cristal Ramirez. The band started while they were all in school together. Sisters Cristal and Alisa Ramirez, along with their best friends, decided to turn their musical after school get-togethers into a career.

- Cristal Ramirez – lead vocals and guitar
- Katie Henderson – guitar and vocals
- McKenna Petty – bass and vocals
- Alisa Ramirez – drums and vocals

== Musical style ==
The Aces have cited as musical and career influences Paramore; Earth, Wind & Fire; The Beatles; New Order; Depeche Mode; Michael Jackson; and Weezer. Their musical style has been described as indie pop and alternative pop.

== Gender as a media focus ==
The Aces are an all-female band and members have expressed the desire to break the idea of the "girl band/girl group" genre. The media has often looked at gender first rather than their music when referring to the Aces, according to Cristal Ramirez, who said in an interview with Capitol Sound DC, "we are just a band! I don’t see why people have to see gender all the time and make it a thing. But at the same time, it is unique and it is a strength of ours that we are all women. We wanna inspire other girls and we get that all the time–fans coming up to us and being like ‘oh my gosh you guys are so inspiring I wanna be in the music industry’ or ‘I wanna start a band.'"

== Discography ==
=== Albums ===
List of studio albums, with release date and label shown
Title	Details
When My Heart Felt Volcanic	Released: April 6, 2018; Label: Red Bull; Formats: Vinyl, CD, Digital download, streaming
Under My Influence	Released: July 17, 2020; Label: Red Bull; Formats: Vinyl, CD, Digital download, streaming
I've Loved You for So Long	Released: June 2, 2023; Label: Red Bull; Formats: Vinyl, CD, digital download, streaming
Gold Star Baby	Released: August 15, 2025; Label: The Aces Music; Formats: Vinyl, CD, digital download, streaming

=== EPs ===
List of extended plays, with release date and label shown
Title	Details
The Blue Aces (as The Blue Aces)	Released: May 11, 2012; Label: Red Bull; Formats: Digital download
Gave You My Heart (as The Blue Aces)	Released: April 18, 2014; Label: Red Bull; Formats: Digital download
I Don't Like Being Honest	Released: June 23, 2017; Label: Red Bull; Formats: Digital download, streaming

=== Singles ===
List of singles, with year released and album shown
Title	Year	Peak chart positions	Album
Title	Year	US Alt. Songs	Album
"Stuck" (original, Spanish version or RAC remix)	2016	38	I Don't Like Being Honest
"Physical"	2017	—	I Don't Like Being Honest
"Baby Who"	2017	—	I Don't Like Being Honest
"Touch"	2017	—	I Don't Like Being Honest
"Fake Nice"	2018	—	When My Heart Felt Volcanic
"Volcanic Love"	2018	—	When My Heart Felt Volcanic
"Lovin' is Bible"	2018	—	When My Heart Felt Volcanic
"Just Like That"	2018	—	When My Heart Felt Volcanic
"Last One" (original or Spanish version)	2018	—	When My Heart Felt Volcanic
"Waiting For You"	2018	—	When My Heart Felt Volcanic
"Daydream"	2020	—	Under My Influence
"Lost Angeles"	2020	—	Under My Influence
"My Phone is Trying to Kill Me"	2020	—	Under My Influence
"Kelly"	2020	—	Under My Influence
"Sleepy Eyes"	2020	—	Under My Influence
"Don't Freak"	2021	—	Non-album single
"Girls Make Me Wanna Die"	2022	—	I've Loved You For So Long
"Always Get This Way"	2023	—	I've Loved You For So Long
"Solo"	2023	—	I've Loved You For So Long
"I've Loved You For So Long"	2023	—	I've Loved You For So Long
"Jealous"	2024	—	Non-album single
"End of My Rope" (The Aces Remix)	2024	—	Nosebleeds: Encore

=== Compilation appearances ===
- Common Culture, Vol. III (Heard Well/2018) – "Fake Nice"

=== Music videos ===
List of music videos, with year released and director shown
Title	Year	Director
"Stuck"	2016	Alisa Ramirez
"Physical"	2017	Charlotte Rutherford
"Baby Who"	2017	Alisa Ramirez
"Volcanic Love"	2018	Nico Poalillo, Alisa Ramirez
"Last One"	2018	Alisa Ramirez
"Daydream"	2020	Alisa Ramirez
"My Phone is Trying to Kill Me"	2020	Alisa Ramirez
"801"	2020	Alisa Ramirez
"Don't Freak"	2021	Daniel Carberry
"Girls Make Me Wanna Die"	2022	Alisa Ramirez
"I've Loved You For So Long"	2023	Alisa Ramirez

== Tours ==
=== Headlining ===
- Waiting for You Tour (2019) (United States)
- Under My Influence Tour (2021)
- I've Loved You For So Long Tour (2023)

=== Opening act ===
- Joywave – Thanks. Thanks for Coming (2017)
- COIN – The North American Tour (2018)
- 5 Seconds of Summer – Meet You There Tour (2018)
- Why Don't We – The Good Times Only Tour (2022)
- The Vamps – Greatest Hits World Tour (UK & Ireland leg)
- Goth Babe– (2024)
- Louis Tomlinson – How Did We Get Here? Tour, North America leg (2026)
