= Brye (musician) =

American indie-pop singer

- Born: Bryanna Noelle Sebring; Glen Ellyn, Illinois, U.S.
- Genre: Indie-pop

Bryanna Noelle Sebring, known professionally as Brye, is an American indie-pop singer, songwriter, and producer. She is best known for her single "LEMONS," released in 2020, which is about toxic relationships.

== Early life ==
Brye was born in Glen Ellyn, Illinois, a suburb of Chicago, alongside her sister and two brothers. Growing up in a musical family, Brye developed an interest in music at early age. She began performing in local theater productions at the age of seven and was posting covers of popular songs on YouTube as a teenager.

== Career ==
=== 2019–2020: Early Career ===
Brye began her music career in 2019 with her debut single, "Million Songs," which explored themes of emotional vulnerability and love. In 2020, her single "LEMONS" gained significant attention.

=== 2022: Debut EP Dream Girl ===
On June 17, 2022, Brye released her debut EP, Dream Girl, a collection of tracks which focus on adolescence, self-discovery, and emotional growth.

=== 2023–2024: RECOVER and Continued Growth ===
In 2023, Brye released her second album, RECOVER, a nine-track project addressing mental health, societal expectations, and resilience. The album featured tracks such as "NOTHING!" (confronting online body shaming), "Jenna" (a duet with Addison Grace about queer love), and "Direct Message" (inspired by body dysmorphia). A deluxe edition of RECOVER was released in 2024.

=== 2026: Cycle Breaker ===
On July 5th, Brye released her first full length album titled Cycle Breaker.

== Advocacy ==
Beyond her music, Brye is a vocal advocate for body positivity and LGBTQ+ representation. Songs like "Diet Culture" and "RECOVER" challenge societal beauty standards and promote self-love.

== Personal life ==
Brye is queer and has openly discussed her experiences with body image and mental health. She lives in Nashville, Brye has expressed an interest in personality psychology, particularly the Enneagram personality test.
