= Chloe Moriondo =

American musician and YouTuber (born 2002)

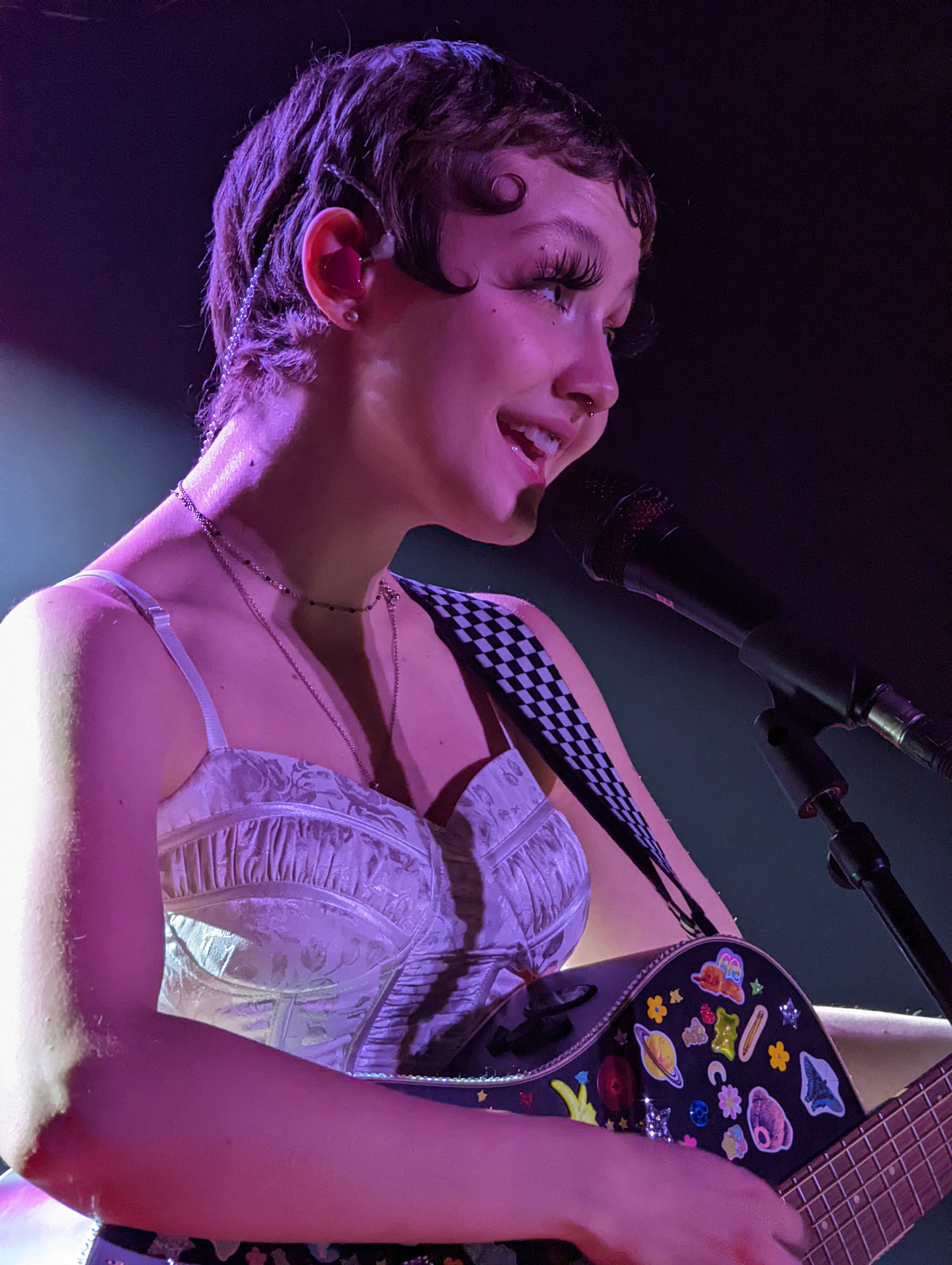
- Moriondo in 2022

Background information
- Born: September 29, 2002 (age 24); Detroit, Michigan, U.S.
- Genres: Indie pop; indie rock; bedroom pop
- Occupations: Singer-songwriter; YouTuber
- Instruments: Vocals; ukulele; guitar; bass
- Years active: 2014–present
- Labels: Fueled by Ramen; Elektra; Atlantic
- Website: chloemoriondo.com

YouTube information
- Channel: chloe moriondo
- Genre: Music
- Subscribers: 2.93 million
- Views: 229 million
- Last updated: 7 Oct 2025

Chloe Moriondo (stylized in all lowercase as chloe moriondo) (born September 29, 2002) is an American singer-songwriter and YouTuber. Her (Note: Moriondo uses both she/her and they/them pronouns. This article uses she/her for consistency.) style blends elements of indie pop, indie rock and bedroom pop, with the occasional hyperpop. Her YouTube channel, which she began in January 2014, sits at just under 3 million subscribers and over 220 million video views.

== Early life ==
Moriondo was born and raised in Metro Detroit, Michigan.

== Career ==
Moriondo self-released her first album, Rabbit Hearted, on July 31, 2018, and her first EP, Spirit Orb, on April 24, 2020. In August 2020, Moriondo was signed to Fueled by Ramen and released "I Want to Be with You".

On May 7, 2021, Moriondo released her first studio album, Blood Bunny with singles "I Want to Be with You" and "Girl on TV". In 2021, she made her late-night debut performing "Bodybag" from her album Blood Bunny on Jimmy Kimmel Live! She later performed a variation of "I Want to Be with You" on The Late Late Show with James Corden.

She released her second EP, puppy luv, in April 2022. She released a deluxe edition of Blood Bunny in June 2022. She joined mxmtoon on her North America tour rising (the tour) from May to June 2022. In October 2022, Moriondo released her album SUCKERPUNCH. From October 12, 2022, through November 19, 2022, she played shows in the United States and Canada. On December 8 she announced the cancellation of the UK and Europe Tour.

Moriondo was featured on Pierce The Veil’s "12 Fractures", the last track off their return album The Jaws of Life, released February 10, 2023. In August 2023, Moriondo collaborated with musician Tommy Fleece on his song "POUR ME OUT".

Moriondo released her third EP "Hell Sounds" on October 5, 2023. This album was a Halloween compilation of previous tracks from albums like "SUCKERPUNCH" (released October 7th 2022). and "Blood Bunny" (released May 7, 2021).

Moriondo released the single "Shoreline" (released January 14, 2025) as a teaser for her upcoming album "Oyster", which released March 28, 2025. The album was rated by website Album of the Year as a 70/100. This release was followed closely by the single track "girls with gills".

== Personal life ==
Moriondo self-identifies as "nonbinary-ish" but also "just a girl" as of June 2021. In September 2021, she revealed to her Twitter followers that she no longer identifies as a lesbian.

== Influences ==
Moriondo has stated that she's been a fan of the genre of pop punk and emo-pop music, saying that they "shaped her music". Citing her influences from 2000's pop punk artists like Green Day, Avril Lavigne, Simple Plan and All Time Low. Moriondo has cited major influence from the band Paramore; where in her music video for favourite band she talks about staying at home with her headphones & listening to Paramore.

== Discography ==
=== Albums ===
Title	Album details
Rabbit Hearted.	Released: July 31, 2018; Label: Self-released; Format: CD, digital download, streaming, vinyl
Blood Bunny	Released: May 7, 2021; Label: Fueled By Ramen; Format: CD, digital download, streaming, vinyl
SUCKERPUNCH	Released: October 7, 2022; Label: Fueled By Ramen; Format: CD, digital download, streaming, vinyl
Oyster	Released: March 28, 2025; Label: Public Consumption, Atlantic; Format: CD, digital download, streaming, vinyl

=== Extended plays ===
Title	Details
Spirit Orb	Released: April 24, 2020; Label: Self-released; Format: CD, digital download, streaming
blood bunny (acoustic)	Released: July 16, 2021; Label: Self-released; Format: Digital download, streaming
puppy luv	Released: April 8, 2022; Label: Fueled By Ramen; Format: Digital download, streaming

=== Singles ===
==== As lead artist ====
Year	Title	Album/EP
2019	"Kalmia Kid"	Non-album single
2020	"Manta Rays"	Blood Bunny
2020	"I Want to Be with You"	Blood Bunny
2020	"GIRL ON TV"	Blood Bunny
2021	"Dreams" (Fleetwood Mac cover)	Non-album single
2021	"I Eat Boys"	Blood Bunny
2021	"not okay" (feat. mazie)	Non-album singles
2021	"Dizzy" (feat. Thomas Headon and Alfie Templeman)	Non-album singles
2022	"sammy"	puppy luv
2022	"Hell Hounds"	Blood Bunny (Deluxe) and SUCKERPUNCH
2022	"Fruity"	SUCKERPUNCH
2022	"Cdbaby<3"	SUCKERPUNCH
2023	“Celebrity - Blood Bunny Version”	SPLIT DECISION
2023	"I Want to Be with You - SUCKERPUNCH Version"	SPLIT DECISION
2023	"Killbot!"	Non-album singles
2024	"September (From Life Is Strange)"	Non-album singles
2025	"Shoreline"	Oyster
2025	"Hate It"	Oyster
2025	"Abyss"	Oyster
2026	"glow"	Non-album single

==== As featured artist ====
Year	Title	Album/EP
2020	"Snail (feat. Chloe Moriondo)" (with cavetown)	Sleepyhead
2020	"Oh My Darling Clementine" (Freddy Quinn cover)	At home with the kids
2020	"Haunt You" (feat. chloe moriondo) (with X Lovers)	Mad World
2020	"Words Ain't Enough" (with Tessa Violet)	Non-album singles
2021	"space girl" (feat. chloe moriondo) (with Frances Forever)	Non-album singles
2021	"Be Around Me" (feat. chloe moriondo) (with Will Joseph Cook)	Every Single Thing
2021	"Mr Loverman" (feat. chloe moriondo) (with Ricky Montgomery)	Non-album singles
2021	"Teenage Dirtbag" (feat. chloe moriondo) (with Cavetown) "Bus Ride" (feat. chloe moriondo) (with Rxseboy)	Non-album singles
2022	"grey space" (feat. chloe moriondo) (with Cavetown)	worm food
2023	"12 Fractures" (with Pierce the Veil)	The Jaws of Life
2023	"POUR ME OUT" (feat. chloe moriondo) (with Tommy Fleece)	Hypermasculine
2023	"You'd Be Stars" (feat. chloe moriondo) (with Sydney Rose)	One Sided
2023	"pressure" (with chloe moriondo) (with aldn)	Non-album singles
2024	"Lonely (Planet Earth)" (with Dillon Francis)	Non-album singles
2026	"Sailboat" (with Cavetown)	Running With Scissors
2026	"Girls Are So Lucky" (feat. chloe moriondo) _{(with Daisy Grenade)}	So Much 2 Say
