= *shels =

shels
- Origin: London, England; California, USA
- Genres: Progressive rock, post-rock, alternative metal, shoegazing, post-metal
- Years active: 2003–present
- Label: Shelsmusic
- Website: http://www.shelsmusic.com

*shels is a British-American rock group, formed in 2003. The band have been described as a supergroup of the British underground music scene, as they have, at various times, featured former members of bands including Mahumodo, Eden Maine and Fireapple Red.

== History ==
The band was formed in 2003 by singer/songwriter Mehdi Safa and drummer Tom Harriman, after the break-up of their former band Mahumodo. *shels took their name from the 1999 Mahumodo EP, entitled Shels. They released an EP, Wingsfortheirsmiles, in 2004 on Shelsmusic, a record label founded by Safa in 2000. The band released their debut full length studio album, Sea of the Dying Dhow on 18 June 2007, in partnership with Undergroove records. The album attracted positive reviews from critics, culminating in it being named one of the top albums of 2007 by Rock Sound magazine. The band toured the UK in June and July of the same year in support of the album, performing with various groups such as Bossk and The Ghost of a Thousand. The tour included a performance at GuilFest, where the band share a stage with My Vitriol and Zico Chain.

The band's second EP, Laurentian's Atoll, was then released in November 2007. This was composed of remastered versions of the three tracks from Wingsfortheirsmiles, four new recordings and an extended version of "water", from Sea of the Dying Dhow. The band embarked on a second UK tour in November 2008, which included a performance at Damnation Festival, where they shared a stage with the likes of Cathedral and Carcass. Their second full-length, entitled Plains of the Purple Buffalo, was released on 27 June 2011.

== Band members ==
While all music and releases have been written by Mehdi Safa, live performances have featured a number of different artists performing with the band. Vocalist Mehdi Safa said in an interview with Rock Sound, "The whole point of *shels is that it is very free, It is not really a band in the traditional sense, we can have people from other bands come in and play certain shows. It is set up to be a very free vehicle. There is a core of who is involved, but you can compare it to The John Williams Orchestra. It has a core but the line-up changes around that core".

The line-up for the band's 2007 tour included:

- Mehdi Safa – vocals, guitar
- Tom Harriman – drums
- Simon Maine – guitar
- Green Dave – guitar
- Phil Maine – guitar
- Red Dave – bass guitar
- Ed Mathews – atmospherics
- Arif Driessen – trumpet

== Discography ==
=== Studio albums ===
- Sea of the Dying Dhow (2007)
- Plains of the Purple Buffalo (2011)

=== EPs ===
- Wingsfortheirsmiles (2004)
- Laurentian's Atoll (2007)

=== Singles ===
- Butterflies (On Luci's Way) (2011)
