= Stick Stickly (song) =

Single by Attack Attack!

from the album Someday Came Suddenly
- Released: June 4, 2008
- Studio: Paper Tiger Studios
- Genre: Metalcore
- Length: 3:31
- Label: Rise
- Songwriters: Andrew Whiting; Andrew Wetzel; Caleb Shomo; John Holgado; Johnny Franck; Austin Carlile
- Producer: Joey Sturgis

Attack Attack! singles chronology
"Stick Stickly" (2008)	"Dr. Shavargo Pt. 3" (2008)

Music video
- "Stick Stickly" on YouTube

"Stick Stickly" is a song by American metalcore band Attack Attack!. It was released on June 4, 2008, as the lead single from their debut studio album, Someday Came Suddenly.

The song became an internet meme for popularizing crabcore, referencing the head bobbing and crab walks in its accompanied music video. The track was met with negative reviews from music critics.

== Background ==
The title, "Stick Stickly" is named from the Nickelodeon character Stick Stickly. The song was included in the 2010 video game, Rock Band Network.

== Composition ==
"Stick Stickly" was written by Andrew Whiting, Andrew Wetzel, Caleb Shomo, John Holgado, Johnny Franck and Austin Carlile, while production was handled by Joey Sturgis. The demo version of the song was recorded at Paper Tiger Studios. The track was one of the first songs the group wrote. The song blends metalcore, auto-tuned vocals, heavy guitar riffs and techno music together.

== Critical reception ==
"Stick Stickly" was met with generally negative reviews from music critics. Jeremy Aaron of AbsolutePunk criticized the song for its "over-reliance on breakdowns on the heavy parts and the vocal hook," and the use of vocoder effects that, "sounds like it was pulled straight out of Forever the Sickest Kids' album." However, he complimented the heavy guitar work and the unclean vocals. John McDonnell of The Guardian unfavorably compared the track to Swedish Eurodance artist Basshunter. Metal Injection remarked, "It sounded like two different songs from the same album being played at once... during the last 30 seconds or so, it sounds like a completely different album from a different band being played." Chip Norman of Buddyhead.com described the song as "the most-offensively-wack-song-of-all-time."

== Legacy ==
Rise was there, and they were like, 'We got this sick video set-up for you guys at this cool house.' And we get to the house and we're like, 'Oh my God, this is so cool.' And we were like, 'Why is there this girl in this dress?' And they were like, 'We're just gonna have her' -- I don’t even remember what the conceptual pitch was. But I do remember that there was one. I think someone explained it to us and we were like, 'Get this: There's a girl. She's in a dress. She doesn't know where to go,' We were kind of roasting it a little bit, if I'm not mistaken. 'Cause we roasted everything, that was just what we did... Caleb is 15 at the time, Jon's 16, Andrew's 17, I'm 18. We're kids. We're not like, 'What's the narrative of this video?' We were like, 'The girl doesn't make sense but the video looks better than the one we did before.' [Those outfits were] was just what we wore. There's no thought put into that either. We would go to American Apparel and try to find the deepest possible V-neck we could. It was like, 'Dude, that's pretty good, but it's not deep enough...' Someone on our team was giving us shit 'cause we did a photoshoot and we were all wearing tank tops and shorts. Like every single person. We just had no style, we just didn't care. I have very curly hair and the owner of Rise was like, 'Dude, you gonna straighten your hair for the video?' And I was like, 'Are you gonna straighten my hair?' Because I have basically dreadlocks at this point, 'cause they're so curly, and he was like, 'Okay.' So he spent two hours straightening my hair before the music video and it hurt so bad.

— Johnny Franck of Attack Attack! recalling the making of the Stick Stickly music video, as quoted by Eli Enis of Kerrang! (June 4, 2019)

In 2008, the video became an internet meme popularizing crabcore. The infamous part of the video that sparked the meme was when guitarist Andrew Whiting is seen squatting low with his legs spread in a "crab-like" stance. Speaking about the video's virality, drummer Andrew Wetzel stated, "We think it's hilarious... There's no such thing as bad press. People may hate you, but as long as they're talking about you, you're on people's minds."

In June 2019, Eli Enis of Kerrang! wrote: "There’s arguably no better distillation of what metalcore was in the late 2000s and early 2010s than the music video for Attack Attack!’s breakout 2008 single, Stick Stickly. From the genre-mashing music to the outfits, haircuts, and crabcore dance moves, the video truly is an artefact of a specific period of time. [...] The now-infamous video exploded in multiple directions: metal traditionalists loathed it, virtually every critic derided it… but, as is often the pattern with novel cultural breakthroughs, the kids couldn’t get enough. [...] By the time Attack Attack! released their follow-up album in 2010, the entire face of metalcore was beginning to be remade in Stick Stickly’s image."

In November 2019, Caleb Shomo and Johnny Franck reunited and released a parody version of the song titled, "Thicc Thiccly".

== Music video ==
There are two versions of the music video for "Stick Stickly". The first version of the video was recorded after the band signed with Rise Records. The first video was low-budget and shows the group performing the song on a bridge in front of a city (Walnut Street Bridge in Harrisburg, Pennsylvania) and later in a club, where a boy struggles to open a door to where the group is performing. The second version of the music video premiered on MTV Headbangers Ball on June 4, 2009. The video begins with a woman, AjileeSuicide, from the SuicideGirls website, sitting in front of an old house. The video then cuts to the group performing the song. Throughout the video, the band is shown head-flailing while playing their instruments and singing, as well as cutting back to the woman who is now sitting inside of the house. Both videos depict Nick Barham as the lead vocalist as both videos were filmed after original vocalist Austin Carlile departed from the band, whom of which performs on the song. According to Shomo, the crab moves in the video was lead guitarist Andrew Whiting's idea.

The music video for the second version of "Stick Stickly" was filmed in Oregon. According to vocalist and guitarist Johnny Franck, their record label came up with the concept of the video. The band used the famous Charles E. Nelson House, which burned down in 2018.

== Personnel ==
Attack Attack!

- Austin Carlile – lead vocals
- Johnny Franck – clean vocals, rhythm guitar
- John Holgado – bass guitar
- Caleb Shomo – keyboards, synthesizers
- Andrew Wetzel – drums
- Andrew Whiting – lead guitar

Production

- Joey Sturgis – producer, engineering, mixing, mastering

== Release history ==
Release history for "Stick Stickly"
Region	Date	Format	Label	Ref.
Various	June 4, 2008	Digital download	Rise	
United States	December 5, 2018	Vinyl	Rise	
