= This Is Where the Fight Begins =

Studio album by The Ghost of a Thousand
- Released: February 19, 2007
- Genre: Hardcore punk
- Length: 28:11
- Label: Undergroove Records, Holy Roar Records
- Producer: Jason Wilson, Sam Burden

The Ghost of a Thousand chronology
This Is Where the Fight Begins (2007)	New Hopes, New Demonstrations (2009)

Professional ratings
Review scores
Source	Rating
Kerrang!	5/5 stars
HardRockHouse.com	7/10
Rockmidgets.com	5/5

This Is Where the Fight Begins is the first full length album by British band The Ghost of a Thousand. The album was released on February 19, 2007, on Undergroove Records. It was given 5K's (out of 5) in the rock magazine Kerrang!. The album was re-released as a 12" record under Holy Roar Records with new art and a bonus CD with nine unheard recordings on September 7, 2009.

== Track listing ==
No.	Title	Length
1.	"Bored of Math"	2:11
2.	"Left for Dead"	2:46
3.	"Up to You"	2:52
4.	"New Toy"	2:57
5.	"Black Art Number One"	2:47
6.	"Married to the Sidewalk"	2:33
7.	"One For The Road"	2:12
8.	"As They Breed They Swarm"	3:48
9.	"No One Ever Gives You a Straight Answer to Anything"	2:02
10.	"The Last Bastion of Heaven Lies Abandoned and Burning"	4:02

Bonus CD:

1. Bored of Math (Live Demo)
2. Left for Dead (Live Demo)
3. Up to You (Live Demo)
4. New Toy (Home Recording)
5. Black Art Number One (Home Recording)
6. As They Breed They Swarm (First Official Band Recording)
7. Tiny Ships In Giant Oceans (Unreleased B-Side)
8. No-One Ever Gives You a Straight Answer to Anything (Instrumental Demo)
9. The Last Bastion of Heaven Lies Abandoned and Burning (Home Recording)

=== Personnel ===
- Tom Lacey - vocals, lyrics, layout and text
- Andy Blyth - guitar
- Jag Jago - guitar
- Memby Jago - drums, percussion
- Gaz Spencer - bass guitar
- Jason Wilson and Sam Burden at Stakeout Studios - Production and engineering. The original CD sleeve was misprinted.
- Guy Davies - additional engineering
- Kurt Ballou - mixing
- Nick Zampiello - mastering
- James Hines - artwork
- Yuki Snow - Japanese band logo

== Awards ==
- No. 6 Best Album of 2007 Critics' Choice, Kerrang! magazine
- Top 5 Metal Albums, Q magazine
- No. 11 Rocksound magazine Album of the Year 2007
