= Small Mercies (disambiguation) =

Small Mercies were an Australian alternative rock band from Brisbane, Queensland.

Small Mercies may also refer to:

== Music ==
- Small Mercies (album), a 1983 album by Norwegian group Fra Lippo Lippi
- Small Mercies, a 1994 album by David Knopfler
- Small Mercies, a 1990 EP by Australian band Huxton Creepers
- "Small Mercies", a song by the New Zealand band The Mutton Birds from their 1999 album Rain, Steam and Speed
- "Small Mercies", a song by Lemon Kittens from their 1980 album We Buy a Hammer for Daddy
- "Small Mercies", a song by The Ghost of a Thousand from their 2009 album New Hopes, New Demonstrations

== Other media ==
- Small Mercies (novel), 2023 novel by Dennis Lehane
- "Small Mercies", a short story by Australian author Tim Winton appearing in the 2005 collection The Turning
  - "Small Mercies", a segment in the 2013 film The Turning, based on the stories by Tim Winton
- Small Mercies: A Boy After War, a 1997 memoir by Canadian writer and journalist Ernest Hillen
- Small Mercies, a 1998 novel by American writer Barbara McCauley
- Small Mercies, a 2000 drama by Australian writer Ailsa Piper
- Small Mercies: Journeys in Africa's Disputed Nations, a 1993 publication by Jeremy Harding
- "Small Mercies", a season 3, two-part episode of the British TV series The Cops
- "Small Mercies", a season 6 episode of The Flying Doctors
- "Small Mercies", a series 12 episode of Midsomer Murders

== See also ==
- "Small Mercies, Sweet Graves", a 2005 single by the Australian group Schvendes
