= Down I Go =

British hardcore band

- Origin: London, England
- Genres: Progressive hardcore
- Years active: 2005–present
- Labels: Undergroove, Shelsmusic, Holy Roar
- Members: Pete Fraser; Ben Standage; Alan Booth
- Past members: Marek Bereza; Tom Savage; Ercan "Surge" Mehmet
- Website: downigo.com

Down I Go are an experimental hardcore band from London.

Their music combines complex song structure and rhythmic patterns with both melodic and screaming vocals, as well as frequently marrying these features with orchestral instrumentation including brass and string sections.

All their major releases have been written around specific individual themes, in release order: dinosaurs, environmental and man-made disasters, fictional robots, historical tyrants, Greek mythology and Icelandic folklore.

Notable fans include musicians Tom Vek, Tim Elsenburg of Sweet Billy Pilgrim, who said their music exemplified "...the imagination gone mad, in a really, really good way", and Jamie Lenman, who described them as "...the best band ever to come out of this tiny island"

== History ==
The band was formed in 2005 by Pete Fraser (vocals), Ben Standage (drums) and Alan Booth (guitars) as an experimental project. They began playing shows with live bassist Marek Bereza and self-released their first album This Is Dinocore in 2006, burning copies onto CDRs and selling them in paper wallets at the venues.

Standage and Fraser had played trombone and saxophone respectively in UK ska band Jesse James, talents which they would bring to bear on future Down I Go releases.

After signing with UK label Undergroove the band released their second record This Is Disastercore in 2006, receiving favourable coverage in print and online, followed by a mini-cd EP, This Is Robocore in 2007. Returning from a tour of Ireland with Dublin band BATS, they set to work on their third long-player, Tyrant, which was released on Undergroove in 2008.

A pay-what-you-want compilation of demos and non-album tracks entitled Witness The Shitness was uploaded by the band to Bandcamp in 2010, and the following year the EP Gods was released on 10" vinyl by US label Shelsmusic to critical acclaim. Towards the end of 2011, with Standage and Booth having relocated to Chicago and Toronto respectively, the band decided to officially split, reuniting for a farewell single, "We Live In Different Countries".

After a break of three years, the band were invited to an artistic residency at Fljótstunga farm in Iceland by one of the proprietors for the purposes of creating a new album. A Kickstarter campaign was begun to cover the cost of flights and ended on 16 July 2014, having raised £4,596, over 30% more than their required goal.

The resultant album You're Lucky God, That I Cannot Reach You is based around Iceland's history and folklore, and was released in 2015 on the Holy Roar record label.

== Related projects ==
Vse na net (Russian: Все на нет, lit. 'All on no')

A one-off recording by a "British hardcore group featuring members of Down I Go and Johnny Truant", titled Menya zovut Vladimir Putin (Russian: Меня зовут Владимир Путин, lit. 'My name is Vladimir Putin') and released on March 1, 2012. The Russian-language track satirizes the 2011-2012 election campaign of Vladimir Putin, which led to his return to the presidency for a third term.

Sammy Davis Jr Jr

Around the same time that Gods was produced, the three band members began work on a separate musical project, intended to be softer and more melodic than Down I Go, entitled Sammy Davis Jr Jr. The recordings were completed in 2014 with guest vocals from Jamie Lenman, director Adam Powell, and BATS singer Rupert Morris. The three track digital-only EP was included as a pledge incentive for the band's Kickstarter campaign, and was released in tandem with the new album.

== Discography ==
- This Is Dinocore – LP Self released 2006
- This Is Disastercore – LP Undergroove 2006
- This Is Robocore – EP Undergroove 2007
- Tyrant – LP Undergroove 2008
- Witness The Shitness – Compilation Self released 2010
- Gods – EP Shelsmusic 2011
- We Live In Different Countries – Single Self released 2011
- You're Lucky God, That I Cannot Reach You – LP Holy Roar 2015
- Mortals – EP Self released 2017
- All Down the Church in Midst of Fire the Hellish Monster Flew, and Passing Onward to the Quire, He Many People Slew – EP Self released 2019
- Aum Shinrikyo - LP Self released 2022
