= Sea of the Dying Dhow =

Studio album by *shels
- Released: June 18, 2007
- Genre: Post-metal
- Length: 59:06
- Label: Undergroove, Shelsmusic

*shels chronology
| Wingfortheirsmiles (2004) | Sea of the Dying Dhow (2007) | Laurentian's Atoll (2007) |

Professional ratings
Review scores
| Source | Rating |
|---|---|
| Blistering | favourable |
| Rock Sound | 9/10 stars |

Sea of the Dying Dhow, released on June 18, 2007, is the first studio album by *shels.

== Track listing ==
| No. | Title | Length |
|---|---|---|
| 1. | "The Conference of the Birds" | 9:13 |
| 2. | "Indian 1" | 4:40 |
| 3. | "The White Umbrella Intro" | 1:53 |
| 4. | "The White Umbrella" | 8:42 |
| 5. | "Water" | 3:26 |
| 6. | "Sea of the Dying Dhow" | 6:20 |
| 7. | "Atoll" | 0:44 |
| 8. | "The Killing Tent" | 4:18 |
| 9. | "Indian 2" | 2:40 |
| 10. | "Return to Gulu" | 6:16 |
| 11. | "In Dead Palm Fields" | 10:58 |
| Total length: | | 59:06 |
