= Eden Maine =

English metalcore and avant garde metal band

- Origin: St Albans, Hertfordshire, England
- Genres: Metalcore, post-metal, mathcore
- Years active: 1999–2005
- Labels: Undergroove
- Members: Adam Symonds; Nick Brown; Kieran Iles; Simon Davis; Phil Buch
- Past members: Neil Green; Faeryn James Lee

Eden Maine were an English metalcore/avant garde metal band from St Albans, Hertfordshire, formed in 1999. As of September 2005, they are on an indefinite hiatus.

== Biography ==
Eden Maine was formed in 1999 by vocalist Adam Symonds and bassist Nick Brown. After going through several lineup changes, drummer Kieran Iles was recruited, and the band started to develop their own sound, drawing elements from metal, and hardcore. At this time, the guitarists in the band were Faeryn Lee and Neil Green. Faeryn soon left the band to move back to the US, and was replaced by Simon Davis.

With Simon in the line up, they completed the writing for their debut EP; The Treachery Pact, and prepared to enter the studio. However, it was around this time, after months of growing tension, that Neil Green decided to move on from the band. The remaining members chose to enter the studio as a four piece. They enlisted the services of Kurt Ballou to handle production duties and entered Southern Studios in January 2002, while advertising for a new guitarist. It was not long before they found interest from Phil Buch, who completed the band's lineup, joining them in the studio to finish the recording.

=== The Treachery Pact ===
The Treachery Pact EP was released in early 2002 through UK label Ignition Records. Gaining many positive reviews from UK and international press, the band started to grow in stature. They embarked on a heavy touring schedule, sharing the stage with many well established bands, including Sepultura, Lostprophets, Converge, The Dillinger Escape Plan and more. The band's touring took them around much of the UK and Europe. During this time they were also courted by several labels, and came very close to signing to Visible Noise, before pulling out of the deal late in the day, feeling that their music might be compromised by the schedule that would be expected of them from the label. They then worked closely with Belgian-based Fuel Records, but never entered into a full agreement with the label. With the band choosing to move away from Ignition (now renamed Engineer) records, they opted to carry on as an unsigned band, until they were presented with an offer completely meeting their satisfaction.

=== To You the First Star ===
In mid 2004, the band entered Foel Studio in Wales as an unsigned band, with producer Andrew Schneider to record their debut album To You the First Star. The band's sound had evolved, moving away from metalcore towards a more epic sound incorporating elements of noisecore, post-metal and post rock.

Following the recording, UK label Undergroove Records showed an interest in working with the band on the release. An agreement was reached and the album was released in early 2005.

The new album split opinions amongst Eden Maine's existing fanbase. Many found the direction shift challenging, exciting and original, while others missed the full-throttled attack of the earlier release. The press, however, were mostly unified in their praise of the album, tipping the band to go on to bigger and better things.

=== Indefinite hiatus ===
Following the release of To You the First Star, the band embarked upon their most intensive touring schedule to date. This time they toured mainly as a headline act, taking bands such as Reflux and Lack along with them. They reached more countries and cities than ever before, subsequently attaining a strong following in mainland Europe.

After three months of non-stop touring, the band took a break to regroup. At this time, a North American label approached them with a view to giving To You the First Star a release. This would be coupled with extensive touring of the US and Canada.

This unfortunately led to inner turmoil for the band, due to the financial restraints among some of the members, and the risks involved. The group went through their most difficult period, and were unsure of the next best step to take.

Conversely, at this time they were enjoying a spree of creativity, once again embarking upon a different direction, involving many more of their individual influences.

The band were unable to work through the conflict caused by the financial problems and inability to tour as they would have liked. Members felt that they had different priorities, and different directions in mind. Rather than break up entirely, they took the decision to take an 'indefinite hiatus' to pursue other musical projects. They took the decision that if and when they were to regroup, they would move on completely from their previous material. And so in early 2006 they played their 'final show', performing material from both their EP and album, with the knowledge that this would be the last time these songs were performed.

The band has remained inactive since, with various members going on to be involved in other projects including:

- The Rifle Volunteer (Adam Symonds and Nick Brown)
- *shels (Simon Davis and Phil Buch)
- Mia Hope - now defunct (Phil Buch)
- Astrohenge (Kieran Iles)
- So This Is Paris - now defunct (Phil Buch)
- Reservations at Dorsia - now defunct (Phil Buch)
- Talons (Simon Davis)
- Latitudes - (Adam Symonds)

== Discography ==
- The Treachery Pact (EP) (2002)
- To You the First Star (2005)
