= Someday Came Suddenly =

Studio album by Attack Attack!
- Released: November 11, 2008
- Recorded: July 2008
- Studio: The Foundation Recording Studios in Connersville, Indiana
- Genres: Metalcore; electronicore; post-hardcore
- Length: 30:24
- Labels: Rise; Twilight
- Producer: Joey Sturgis

Attack Attack! chronology
If Guns Are Outlawed, Can We Use Swords? (2008)	Someday Came Suddenly (2008)	Attack Attack! (2010)

Singles from Someday Came Suddenly
- 1. "Stick Stickly" Released: June 4, 2008; 2. "Dr. Shavargo Pt. 3" Released: August 14, 2009

Someday Came Suddenly is the debut studio album by American metalcore band Attack Attack!. It was released on November 11, 2008, through Rise Records. The album's name derives from the third track, "Bro, Ashley's Here", and is the only album to feature vocalist Austin Carlile. Many of the album's lyrics feature strong Christian themes.

== Background and recording ==
Someday Came Suddenly was recorded at The Foundation in Connersville, Indiana, in 2008, and released that November. Attack Attack! had been signed to Rise Records shortly after the release of their EP If Guns Are Outlawed, Can We Use Swords? earlier that year. Three of the album's tracks – "Party Foul", "What Happens If I Can't Check My MySpace When We Get There?", and "Dr. Shavargo Pt. 3" – are re-recordings of the five songs on If Guns Are Outlawed, Can We Use Swords?.

Producer Joey Sturgis recalled the album's recording process: "I would argue that I was the perfect producer, because at that time I was so obsessed with the perfectionism of it that there was no-one else who would’ve done it that way. My approach to the record was, 'Let’s make it over-the-top polished and perfect as possible. But super-brutal, but super-poppy… Basically take all the character and the attitude out of it and just make it sound almost like a robot played it.'"

In the fall of 2008, the group toured with Maylene and the Sons of Disaster, A Static Lullaby, Showbread and Confide. During this tour, the band parted ways with Carlile and he was replaced by Nick Barham of For All We Know. The group also joined Escape the Fate on their US headlining tour in February and March 2009 along with William Control, and Burn Halo.

== Release and promotion ==
Lead single "Stick Stickly" was released for digital download on June 4, 2008. It is named after the Nickelodeon character Stick Stickly, a popsicle stick voiced by Paul Christie that hosted the programming block Nick in the Afternoon. The music video for "Stick Stickly" debuted on MTV Headbangers Ball in 2009. The video is infamous for inspiring the crabcore internet meme, named for the members of the band and other electronicore artists squatting rhythmically in a "crab-like" stance.

"Dr. Shavargo Pt. 3" was released on August 14, 2009 as the album's second single. The song had a music video produced for it, which consists of a live performance filmed in Pontiac, Michigan at the Crofoot Ballroom during their tour with Escape the Fate. Neither video features Carlile, who had been replaced by Nick Barham by the time they were filmed.

== Music ==
Someday Came Suddenly contains elements of electronic music, pop punk, crunk, metalcore, emo and screamo. The album's choruses have been described as "Blood on the Dance Floor on uppers," and its more metallic sections have drawn comparisons to Converge. Michael Siebert of Invisible Oranges assessed: "The frenzied manner in which Attack Attack! stitches these elements together seems to point to a disregard (or lack of understanding) for songwriting conventions. [...] Attack Attack! songs are mostly a series of bridges with intros and outros." The album has also been characterized as sounding like "a band with no influences that were active prior to the mid-2000s."

== Reception and legacy ==
Professional ratings
Review scores
Source	Rating
AbsolutePunk	51%
Alter the Press!	2/5 stars
PunkNews.org	1.5/5 stars

At just over 30 minutes long, the album darts between electronic music, pop punk, crunk, and metalcore at such a ferocious speed that it’s a wonder the album is digestible at all. But somehow, it is. As a friend noted, it’s remarkable for an album to contain so many different styles while every song still manages to sound the same.

— Michael Siebert of Invisible Oranges (June 7, 2018)

Someday Came Suddenly peaked at number 193 on the Billboard 200 and number 25 on the Independent Albums chart. Its highest peak was at number 9 on the Heatseekers Albums chart, where it spent 32 weeks. While the album was commercially a moderate success, it received generally mixed reviews, with praise for the heavier tracks and unclean vocals and criticism of its electronic elements and use of Auto-Tune. Gregory Adams of The Georgia Straight and John McDonnell of The Guardian unfavorably compared lead single "Stick Stickly" to Swedish Eurodance artist Basshunter.

Eric Schneider of AllMusic gave a positive review for the album stating, "the emo act Attack Attack! presents a restless outing that ranges from the melodic tune 'Bro, Ashley's Here' to the searing screamo number 'Party Foul'. While the shift between the two sounds can be disorienting, the group's keyboard-centric arrangements manage to tie Someday Came Suddenly together, as best revealed on 'The People's Elbow'." Jeremy Aaron of AbsolutePunk gave a mixed review praising the group's ability to be both heavy and catchy, but criticized their opposite styles, "simply off-putting at times." He ended off calling the album, "uninspired, with most of the songs following the same formula."

Sean Reid of Alter the Press! criticized the tracks such as "Bro, Ashley's Here", "Shred, White, And Blue" and "Party Foul" for, "following the structure of uninspiring hardcore music with electronic undertones and vocoder singing vocals." PunkNews.org gave a negative review of the album stating, "Attack Attack! is just your typical, generic screamo band, with electronica breakdowns of course."

In 2018, Michael Siebert of Invisible Oranges wrote: "Listening to Attack Attack!’s magnum opus in 2018 has me wondering if we’ve perhaps misread scene music from the beginning. Maybe it wasn’t meant for anyone other than those strange kids that dotted the halls of Billings Senior High School (and other secondary education facilities across the nation). Attack Attack!, and by extension scenecore at large, couldn’t have been gunning for true mainstream acceptance. More than punk, more than noise, scene music is truly despised by everyone except its target demographic. Perhaps that’s worth celebrating."

In 2024, John Hill of Loudwire named it the best metalcore album of 2008.

== Track listing ==
No.	Title	Length
1.	"Hot Grills and High Tops"	0:42
2.	"Stick Stickly"	3:31
3.	"Bro, Ashley's Here"	3:18
4.	"Shred, White & Blue"	2:35
5.	"Party Foul"	2:36
6.	"What Happens If I Can't Check My MySpace When We Get There?"	2:36
7.	"Interlude" (Instrumental)	2:07
8.	"The People's Elbow"	2:37
9.	"Kickin' Wing, Animal Doctor"	2:28
10.	"Dr. Shavargo Pt. 3"	3:42
11.	"Catfish Soup"	2:58
12.	"Outro" (Instrumental)	1:24
Total length:		30:24

== Personnel ==
Credits for Someday Came Suddenly adapted from AllMusic.

Attack Attack!

- Austin Carlile – unclean vocals
- Johnny Franck – clean vocals, rhythm guitar
- Andrew Whiting – lead guitar
- John Holgado – bass guitar
- Caleb Shomo – keyboards, programming, backing vocals
- Andrew Wetzel – drums

Production

- Joey Sturgis – producer, engineering, mixing, mastering
- Keaton Andrews – photography
- Sons of Nero – artwork

== Charts ==
Chart performance for Someday Came Suddenly
Chart (2008)	Peak position
US Billboard 200	193
US Heatseekers Albums (Billboard)	9
US Independent Albums (Billboard)	25
