= Metalcore =

Genre of music

- Etymology: Metal + -core
- Other names: Metallic hardcore
- Stylistic origins: Heavy metal; hardcore punk; tough guy hardcore; groove metal
- Cultural origins: Late 1980s–early 1990s, United States
- Derivative forms: Hyperpop; pop screamo; sass

Subgenres
- Mathcore; Risecore

Fusion genres
- Deathcore; easycore; electronicore; melodic metalcore; Nintendocore; nu metalcore; progressive metalcore; srscore

Regional scenes
- Boston; Chicago; New York; Ohio; Southeast England; Sheffield

Other topics
- Post-hardcore; beatdown hardcore; melodic hardcore; crossover thrash

Metalcore is a broadly defined music genre combining elements of heavy metal and hardcore punk, originating in the 1990s United States and becoming popular in the 2000s. Metalcore typically has aggressive verses and melodic choruses, together with slow, intense passages called breakdowns. Other defining traits are low-tuned, percussive guitar riffs, double bass drumming, and a highly produced sound. Vocalists typically switch between clean vocals (melodic, emotional singing) and harsh vocals (including shouting and screaming). Lyrics are often personal, inward-looking and emotive. It is debated whether metalcore is a subgenre of metal and hardcore, or a genre of its own. Many metalheads do not regard metalcore as a heavy metal subgenre, due to differences musically, vocally, lyrically and subculturally.

Metalcore grew out of hardcore in the late 1980s and early 1990s and was pioneered by bands such as Integrity, Earth Crisis and Converge, whose style is sometimes referred to as metallic hardcore. These bands combined hardcore with elements of thrash and groove metal. During the decade, the genre diversified, with Converge, the Dillinger Escape Plan, Botch and Coalesce pioneering mathcore, while Overcast, Shadows Fall and Darkest Hour merged metalcore with melodic death metal to create melodic metalcore.

During the early 2000s, melodic metalcore bands such as Killswitch Engage, All That Remains, Trivium, As I Lay Dying, Atreyu, Bullet for My Valentine and Parkway Drive found mainstream popularity. In the subsequent years, the genre saw increased success through social networking on Myspace and internet memes such as crabcore. During this time, artists began to draw influence from a wide variety of sources, which led to genre cultivating a plethora of fusion genres including electronicore, deathcore, Nintendocore, progressive metalcore and nu metalcore. In the 2010s and 2020s, the genre saw even greater commercial success and became the most popular style of heavy rock music, with albums by Bring Me the Horizon, Architects, Asking Alexandria, the Devil Wears Prada and Of Mice & Men entering the top 10 of international albums charts.

== Etymology ==
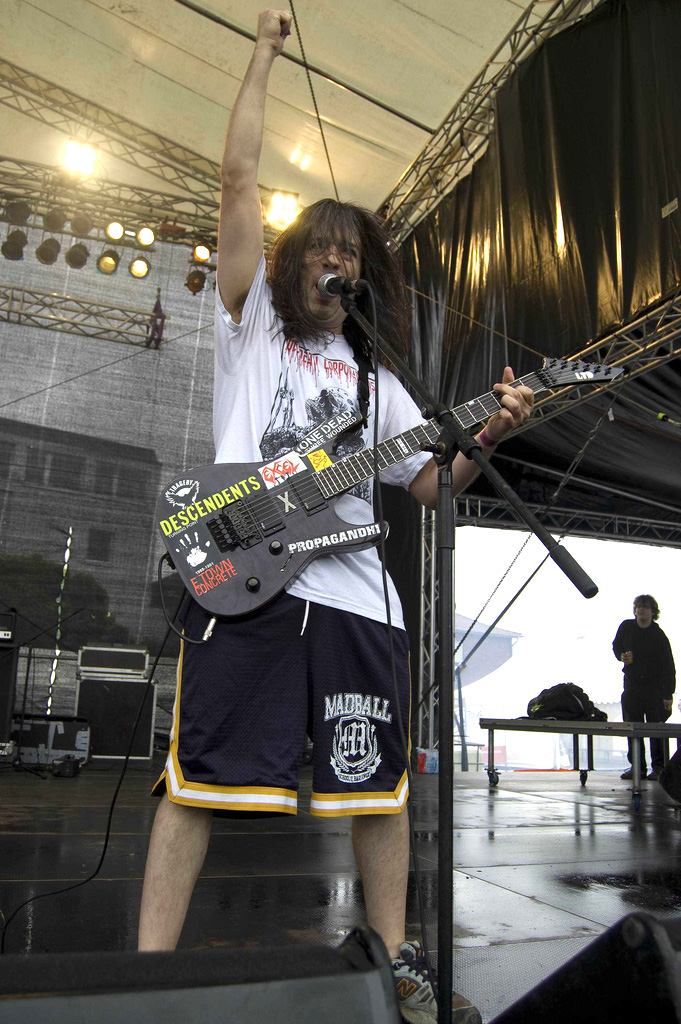
Shai Hulud guitarist Matt Fox has been credited by some for popularizing the "metalcore" term.

The term "metalcore" is a portmanteau of the words "metal" and "hardcore", and was originally tongue-in-cheek. During the 1980s, Maximumrocknroll had used early variations of the term, referring to Richmond band Black Pyramid as "heavy-metal core" in February 1985; Oxnard band False Confessions as "metal-core" in December 1985; Mesa band Desecration as "death metal core" in May 1986; and Austin band Last Will as "ghoulish metal/core" in December 1986.

Phillip Trapp of Loudwire states that Shai Hulud guitarist Matt Fox is widely credited for playing a role in "popularizing" the term. However, in a 2008 interview, Fox claimed the term had already been in use before his band began releasing music. He recalled: "There were bands before Shai Hulud started that my friends and I were referring to as 'metalcore.' Bands like Burn, Deadguy, Earth Crisis, even Integrity. These bands that were heavier than the average hardcore bands. These bands that were more progressive [...] my friends and I would always refer to them as 'metalcore' because it wasn't purely hardcore and it wasn't purely metal [...] so we would joke around and say, 'Hey, it's metalcore. Cool!' But it was definitely a tongue-in-cheek term." Alternatively, Jorge Rosado of Merauder claimed in a 2014 interview that he and his band coined the term.

Luke Morton of Metal Hammer stated that the word "means different things to different people," highlighting the fact that the tag has been variously applied to stylistically dissimilar bands such as Killswitch Engage, Earth Crisis, Asking Alexandria and Parkway Drive.

== Characteristics ==
=== Stylistic elements ===
The word "metalcore" is one of the few subgenres of music that conjures up an incredibly different range of sounds depending on who you ask. For old heads, it brings up a moment in time when the worlds of heavy metal and hardcore punk combined to a new underground genre, a grassroots movement and [an] exciting time for punk. For others, big room metal anthems pitted with poppy choruses are conjured, riffs descended from the Gothenburg school of metal contorted into music with a sense of bounce.

— John Hill of Loudwire (May 25, 2020)

Metalcore fuses elements of hardcore punk with heavy metal, as well as incorporating elements of groove metal, crossover thrash and melodic death metal. It is known for its use of breakdowns. According to Lewis Kennedy, although metalcore existed "in some form or another" throughout the 1990s, it was only during the early 2000s that metalcore became codified or distinguished as a genre with specific traits. He links this with the movement known as the "New Wave of American Heavy Metal".

There is debate as to whether metalcore is a fusion genre, a subgenre, or a genre of its own. Wiederhorn and Turman (2013) argue that "it's too simple to describe metalcore as a mere hybrid of metal and hardcore". Lewis Kennedy (2015) says "metalcore's primary aesthetic is one of hybridity", explaining, "Whereas crossover was perceived as hardcore mixing with metal, or vice versa, metalcore's very foundation is an assemblage of metal and hardcore (and other genres) that does not necessarily pride one over the other". Many traditional metalheads and hardcore fans do not accept metalcore as being part of their genres.

The earliest metalcore bands, such as Botch and Cave In, were rooted in hardcore punk. Some later acts, such as Killswitch Engage, took on a more accessible heavy metal sound, while also incorporating elements of Swedish melodic death metal and Boston hardcore. Many 2000s metalcore bands were heavily influenced by melodic death metal, and incorporated elements of the style into their music. Others drew influence from new wave of British heavy metal bands such as Iron Maiden in their guitar work. Vice stated that "every band was clearly just as influenced by complex guitar parts as they were by hardcore bravado". Additionally, during this time many bands began fusing various elements of other genres such as screamo, emo, post-hardcore, melodic hardcore, pop-punk, indie rock, mainstream rock, post-rock, alternative rock, arena rock, glam rock, nu metal, electropop, electronica, orchestra, progressive music and ambient music into their styles.

=== Instrumentation ===
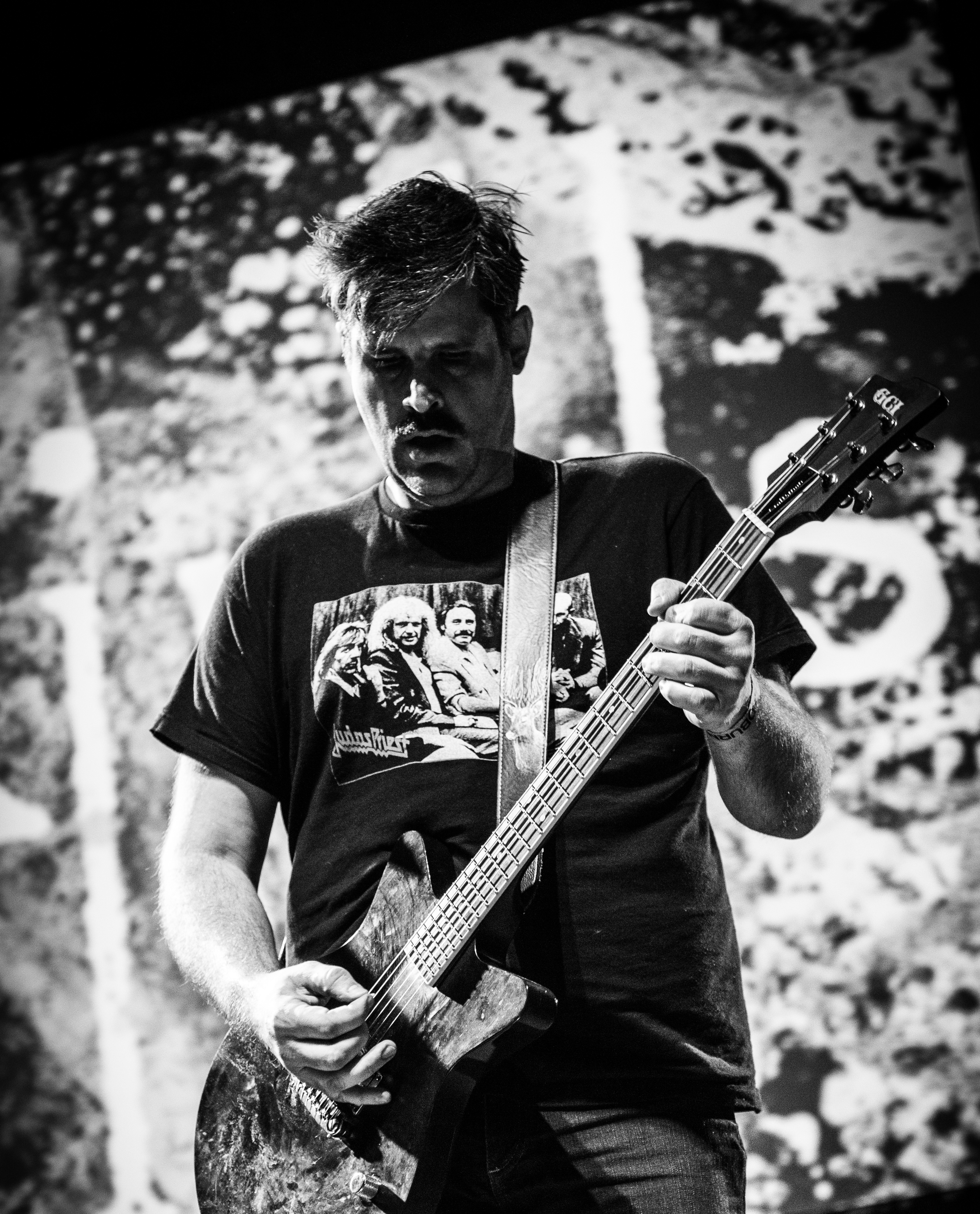
Converge guitarist Kurt Ballou

Instrumentally, metalcore generally has percussive guitar riffs and stop-start rhythm guitar, with much use of palm-muting. Metalcore is known for its emphasis on breakdowns, which are slow, intense passages during a song. Bands may also use pick scraping and dissonant chords to make these breakdowns more chaotic.

Drop guitar tunings are often used in metalcore. Most bands use tuning ranging between Drop D and A, although lower tunings, as well as 7 and 8 string guitars, are not uncommon. Drumming is similar to that in hardcore and metal, often including double-kick drumming. Author James Giordano said that metalcore is usually played at slower tempos than the styles its artists draw influence from.

Metalcore songs usually have linear song structures, often a heavy verse followed by a melodic chorus. Unlike heavy metal, many metalcore songs lack guitar solos, though 2000s melodic metalcore bands such as Avenged Sevenfold, Bullet for My Valentine, All That Remains, As I Lay Dying, and Unearth used them frequently.

=== Vocals and lyrics ===
Metalcore vocalists usually mix "clean" vocals—melodic, emotional singing—with "harsh" vocals—including shouting, roaring and screaming, a harsh vocal technique that became popular in the underground punk and metal scenes of the 1980s. Early metalcore acts were characterized by a "raw, scream-meets-shout vocal style". Later metalcore bands often alternate between harsh vocals and clean singing, usually during the bridge or chorus of a song. Revolver referred to these as "post-hardcore sing-alongs." Although many modern metalcore songs have choruses that contain hooks, some bands omit clean vocals entirely. Other bands use clean vocals sparingly, for the purpose of "coloring a mood," according to Joe DiVita of Loudwire. Modern metalcore clean vocals have been likened to the mainstream emo and pop-punk music of the 2000s. The vocals in metalcore have also drawn comparisons to glam rock singing. Metalcore eventually became associated with autotuned vocals.

A common trope in metalcore is for vocalists to utter the nonce word "blegh", which has been used by bands such as Architects. According to Loudwire, this is believed to have started with Stray From the Path's 2009 album Make Your Own History. This trope became less popular by the 2020s. Variations include "oh," "buh" and "ugh". According to Loudwire, vocalists use these as "an extra sound effect."

Metalcore lyrics are often personal, introspective and emotional, and may also explore political topics. These lyrics have more in common with hardcore than traditional heavy metal, which often has fantastical lyrics.

=== Production ===
Early metalcore recordings were generally lo-fi, which made for raw and live-sounding albums, borrowing from traditional hardcore. By stark contrast, modern metalcore tends to have highly polished production, such as heavy use of processing, layering, programming and synthesizers. Many modern bands in the genre opt for a "studio-crafted experience", using the recording studio as an instrument and working closely with the producer to "create" their music.

=== Fashion ===
During the mid-2000s and early 2010s, metalcore became associated with clothing and accessories such as black V-necks, skinny jeans, lip piercings, and straightened hair. Around the end of the 00s, eye liner and brightly colored belts also became associated with the genre after reportedly being popularized by bands such as Alesana, blessthefall, Drop Dead, Gorgeous and From First to Last. The metalcore subgenre of deathcore is associated with short hair, baseball caps, earlobe plugs and sportswear. These styles have more in common with hardcore fashion, and they differ from typical metalhead attire.

== History ==
=== Precursors: 1980s ===
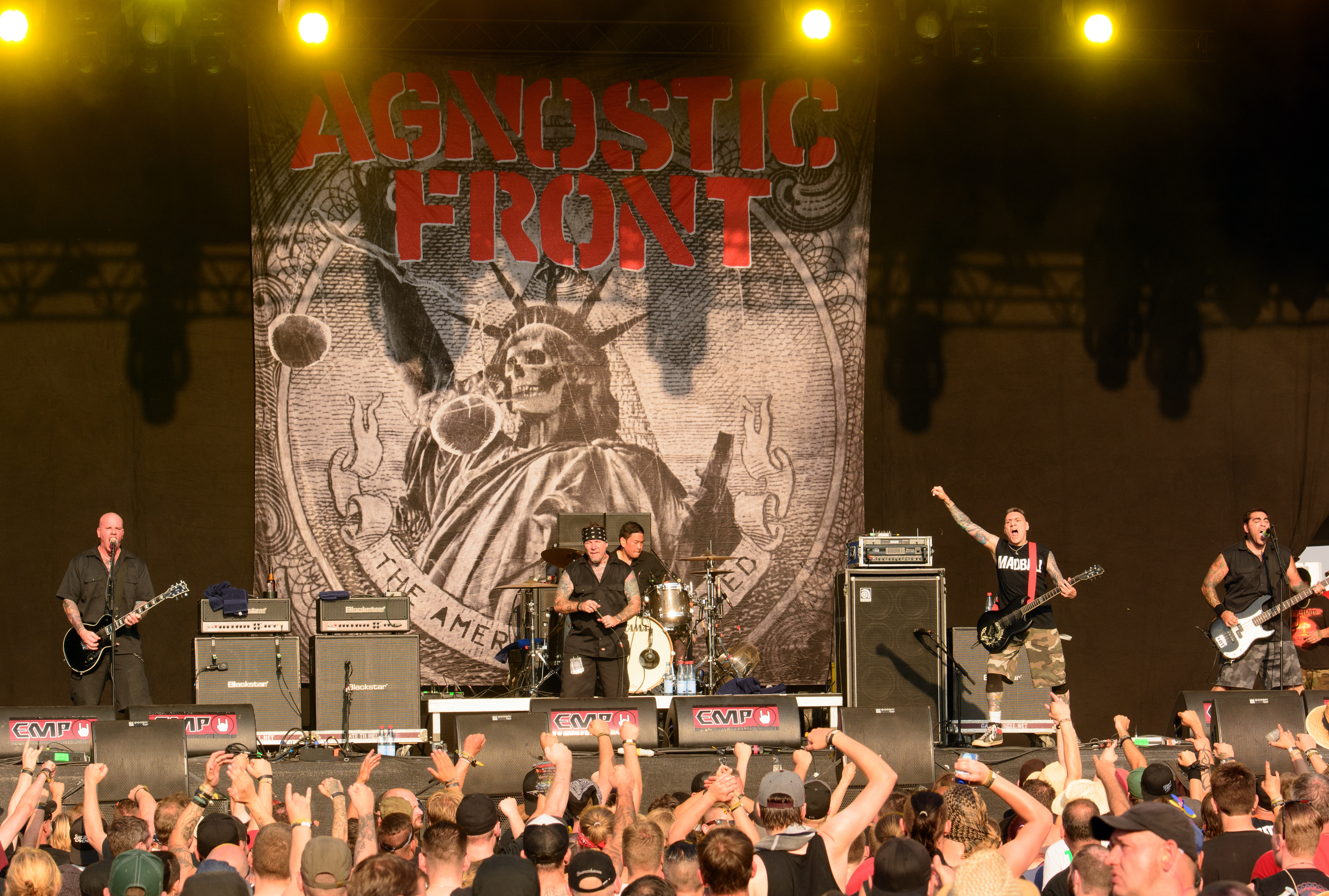
Agnostic Front were an early band to merge elements of metal with hardcore

Many of the originators of hardcore punk took influence from the sound of heavy metal, including Black Flag, the Bad Brains, Discharge and the Exploited. Furthermore, during the 1980s many genres originated merging the two styles, including crust punk, sludge metal and crossover thrash. Nonetheless, punk and metal cultures and music remained fairly separate through the 1980s.

Bands in the New York hardcore scene in particular put a significant emphasis on the influence of metal, building their own take on hardcore, based around groove-driven, palm muted guitar riffs. Early on, this scene saw the development of the hardcore breakdown, an amalgamation of Bad Brains' reggae and hardcore backgrounds, which encouraged moshing. It was this New York-style hardcore that metalcore grew directly out of.

=== Origins: late 1980s and 1990s ===
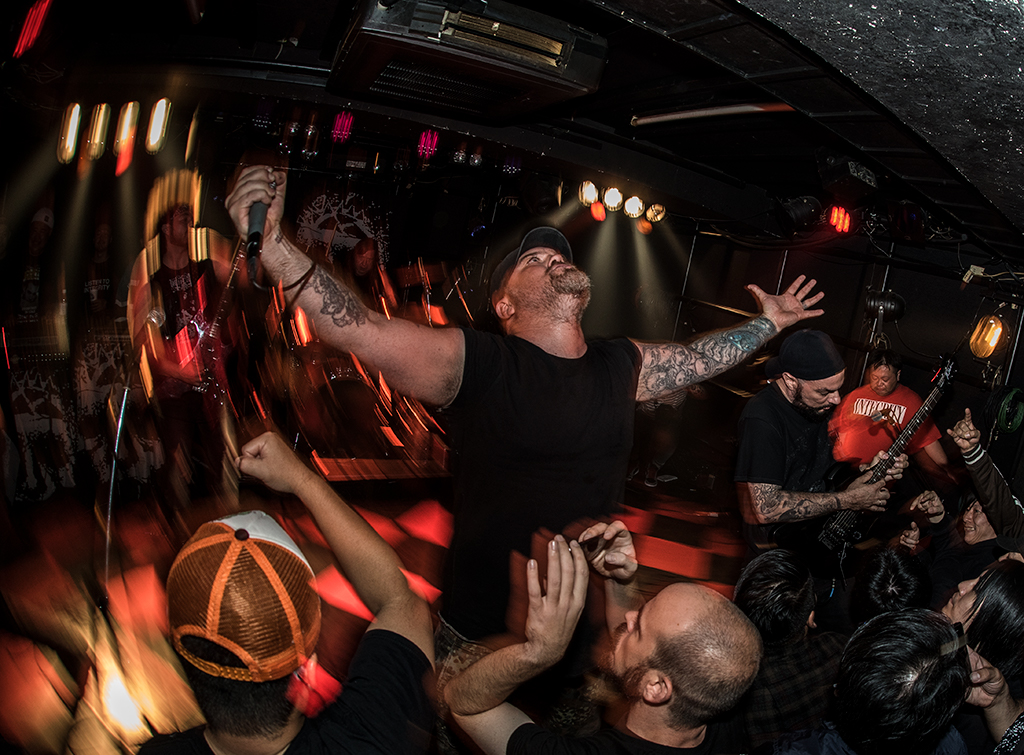
Integrity in Tokyo, Japan in 2017.

One of the earliest metalcore scenes was that of Cleveland, Ohio. Fronted by Integrity and Ringworm, the sound of bands in the scene was distinctly darker than what the genre would become. Jorge Martins of Ultimate Guitar stated that some of these acts "fused Slayer-based assaulting riffs with Pantera-leaning plummeting breakdowns and punk's ferocity and ethics, and a whole new beast was formed." Integrity's debut album Those Who Fear Tomorrow (1991) merged hardcore with apocalyptic lyrics and metal's guitar solos and chugging riffs to create one of the primeval albums in the genre. Revolver magazine writer Elis Enis stated that the album "influenced practically every breakdown that's been recorded since". Whereas, Ringworm's debut The Promise (1993) made use of a style closer to crossover thrash while also putting a heavy emphasis on breakdowns. The term "holy terror" refers to this specific style of metalcore which Integrity and Ringworm pioneered. The style is typified by soaring guitar leads, gravelly vocals and lyrics discussing western esotericism.

Philadelphia's Starkweather were also an important early metalcore band, with their album Crossbearer (1992) which merged early metal's grooves and dark atmospheres with elements of hardcore. Rorschach also pioneered a distinctly dissonant and noise-influence niche into this early metalcore sound, which would go on to define noisecore and mathcore.

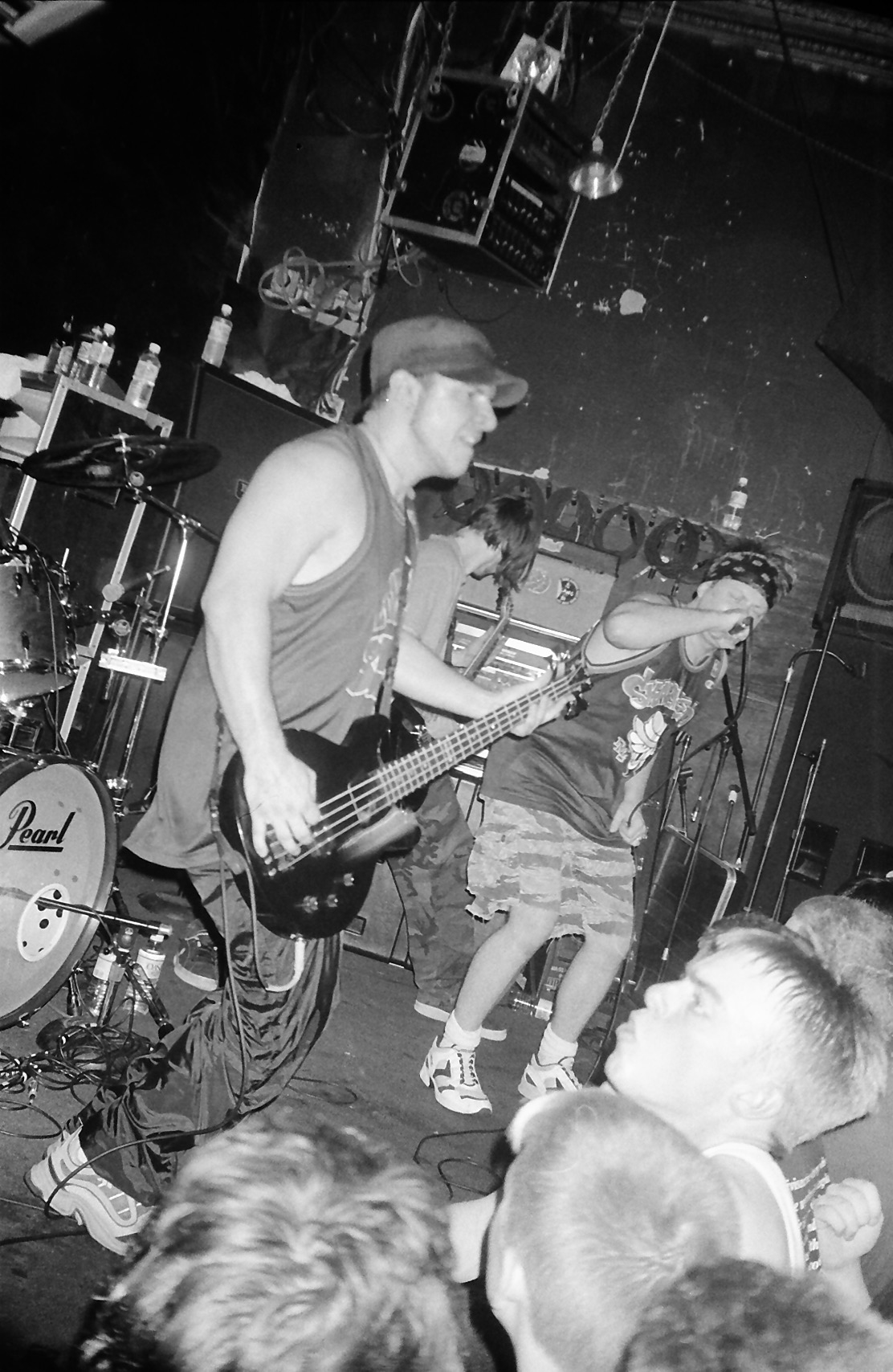
Earth Crisis performing in 1998

In 1993, Earth Crisis released "Firestorm", a song which became one of the most influential in metalcore. The band's militant vegan straight edge ethic and emphasis on chug riffs saw them immediately influence a wave of subsequent bands and gained coverage by major media outlets like CNN, CBS and MTV. The EP the song was a part of was also one of the earliest releases by Victory Records who go on to be a defining part of the metalcore scene in the coming years, through releasing many of the style's most successful albums.

Boston, Massachusetts too developed an early metalcore scene, led by Overcast who formed in 1990. Much of this scene were based around Hydra Head Records, which was founded by Aaron Turner after moving to Boston. Converge were one of the earliest and most prominent groups from the city, formed in 1990. Using Rorschach's music as their sonic template, the band's experimental attitude, emotional lyrics and attention to dynamics led to them becoming one of the most influential bands in the genre. Converge, along with Morris Plains, New Jersey's the Dillinger Escape Plan and Tacoma, Washington's Botch were three of the founding acts in the style's mathcore subgenre, with Kansas City, Missouri's Coalesce and New Brunswick, New Jersey's Deadguy being prominent acts transitioning towards the style. Converge's guitarist Kurt Ballou opened the recording studio GodCity Studio in 1998, and would go on to record many of the most influential subsequent hardcore records from the city.

New York City's Merauder released their debut album Master Killer in 1995, merging the sounds of metalcore, earlier New York hardcore and the newly emerged beatdown hardcore style. Of the album, Revolver writer Elis Enis stated "any self-proclaimed 'metallic hardcore' band of the last 25 years is indebted to Master Killer's steel-toed stomp." Along with All Out War, Darkside NYC and Confusion, Merauder were a part of a wave of bands defining a newer, increasingly metallic style of hardcore in New York that had long been one of the epicentres of the genre. Long Island's Vision of Disorder were also a prevalent band in the scene, being one of the first bands to incorporate clean singing into the genre, which would soon become a staple, as well as incorporating elements of nu metal. In a 2005 article by Billboard magazine, writer Greg Pato stated that "with seemingly every local teen waving the VOD banner circa the mid/late '90s, it seemed as though it was only a matter of time before VOD would become the band to take 'metalcore' to a massive audience".

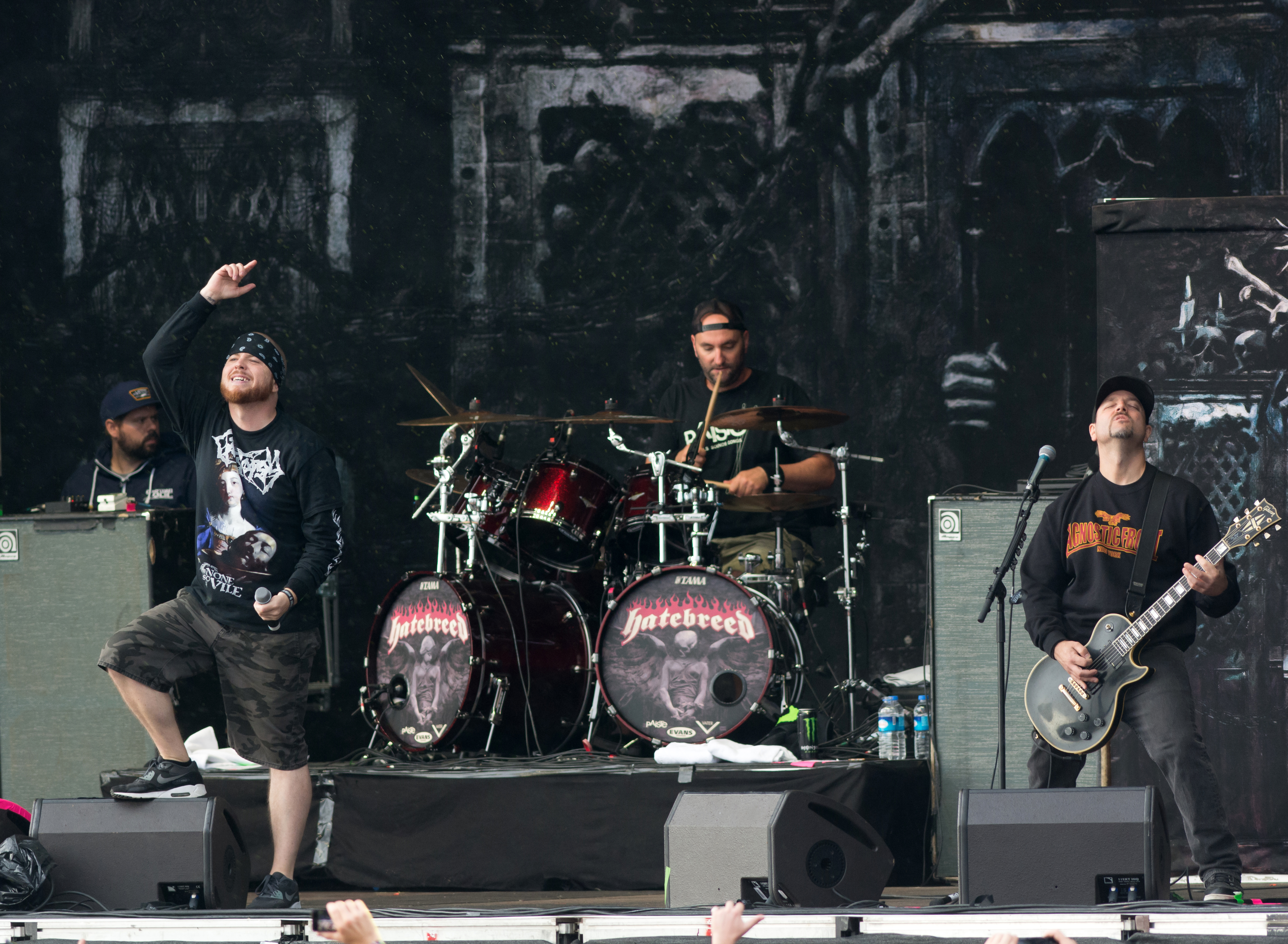
Metalcore band Hatebreed in 2017.

Bridgeport, Connecticut's Hatebreed released their debut album Satisfaction is the Death of Desire in 1997. The album helped the band achieve underground success, selling 158,000 copies, according to Nielsen SoundScan, and holds the record for Victory Record's best selling debut album. The band's style merged classic hardcore with beatdown and metalcore, while also overtly referencing metal bands like Slayer. In a 2015 Metal Hammer article, writer Stephen Hill stated "The difference between Hatebreed and many of their influences is that where a band like Madball were happy to co-exist with metal bands without feeling like they were part of the same scene, Hatebreed actively went out of their way to become the hardcore band metal fans listen to." Other influential metalcore bands of the time include Shai Hulud, Zao and Disembodied.

Orange County, California metalcore band Eighteen Visions contrasted the metalcore scene's usual hyper masculine aesthetic of "army and sports clothes" with "skinny jeans, eyeliner and hairstyles influenced by Orgy and Unbroken". This visual style led to the band being called "fashioncore". Jasamine White-Gluz of Exclaim! wrote that Eighteen Visions look "more like a boy band than a popular hardcore group. Critics tag the band for putting fashion at the centre of their music, but it adds a playful and interesting touch to a band that sounds much tougher than it looks." A scene of bands in Orange County including Bleeding Through, Avenged Sevenfold and Atreyu continued this in Eighteen Visions' wake, and influenced emo and scene fashion in the coming decade.

As the decade drew to a close, a wave of metalcore bands began incorporating elements of melodic death metal into their sound. This formed an early version of what would become the melodic metalcore genre, with Shadows Fall's Somber Eyes to the Sky (1997), Undying's This Day All Gods Die (1999), Darkest Hour's The Prophecy Fulfilled (1999), Unearth's Above the Fall of Man (1999), Prayer for Cleansing's Rain in Endless Fall (1999) being some of the style's earliest releases. CMJ writer Anthony Delia also credited Florida's Poison the Well and their first two releases The Opposite of December... A Season of Separation (1999) and Tear from the Red (2002) as "design[ing] the template for most of" the melodic metalcore bands to come. Alternative Press Magazine described melodic metalcore as the "breakdown-heavy counterpart" of melodic death metal, referring to the latter genre as the "founding ancestor" of the former. At the Gates' 1995 album Slaughter of the Soul was influential for many melodic metalcore bands. Malcolm Dome of Revolver wrote that without the album, modern North American melodic metalcore acts such as As I Lay Dying and All That Remains "wouldn't even exist."

=== Mainstream success: 2000s ===
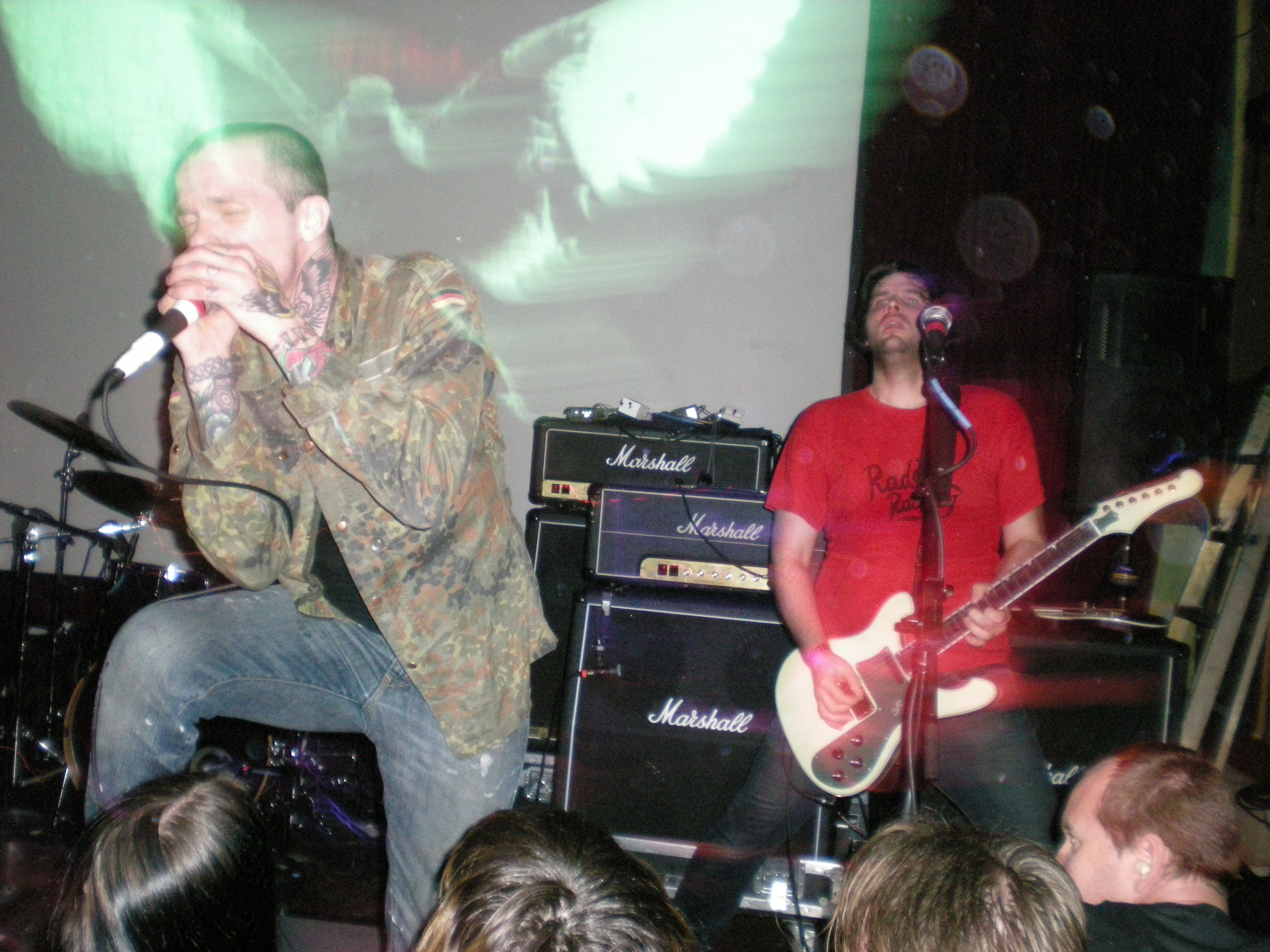
Converge's Jane Doe (2001) is one of the most critically acclaimed albums in metalcore.

Converge's Jane Doe was released on 4 September 2001 to universal critical and fan acclaim. The album influenced the development of the sound of other U.S. bands like Norma Jean and Misery Signals as well as international acts like Eden Maine, Johnny Truant and Beecher. Blake Butler of Allmusic stated that Converge "put the final sealing blow on their status as a legend in the world of metallic hardcore" with the album, calling it "an experience -- an encyclopedic envelopment of so much at once." Terrorizer Magazine named it their 2001 Album of the Year, and it was named the greatest album of the 2000s by Noisecreep, Sputnikmusic and Decibel.

Douglasville, Georgia's Norma Jean and the Chariot were both influential artists continuing metalcore's earlier sound into the 2000s. Norma Jean's O' God, the Aftermath (2005) was Grammy award nominated for Best Recording Package and the Chariot's Long Live (2010) was listed as one of Kerrang!'s "21 best U.S. metalcore albums of all time". In contrast to these bands' dark approach to the genre, Buffalo, New York's Every Time I Die incorporated Southern rock elements and humor, Kerrang! noted them as "shaped the cutting edge of modern metalcore."

==== Melodic metalcore ====
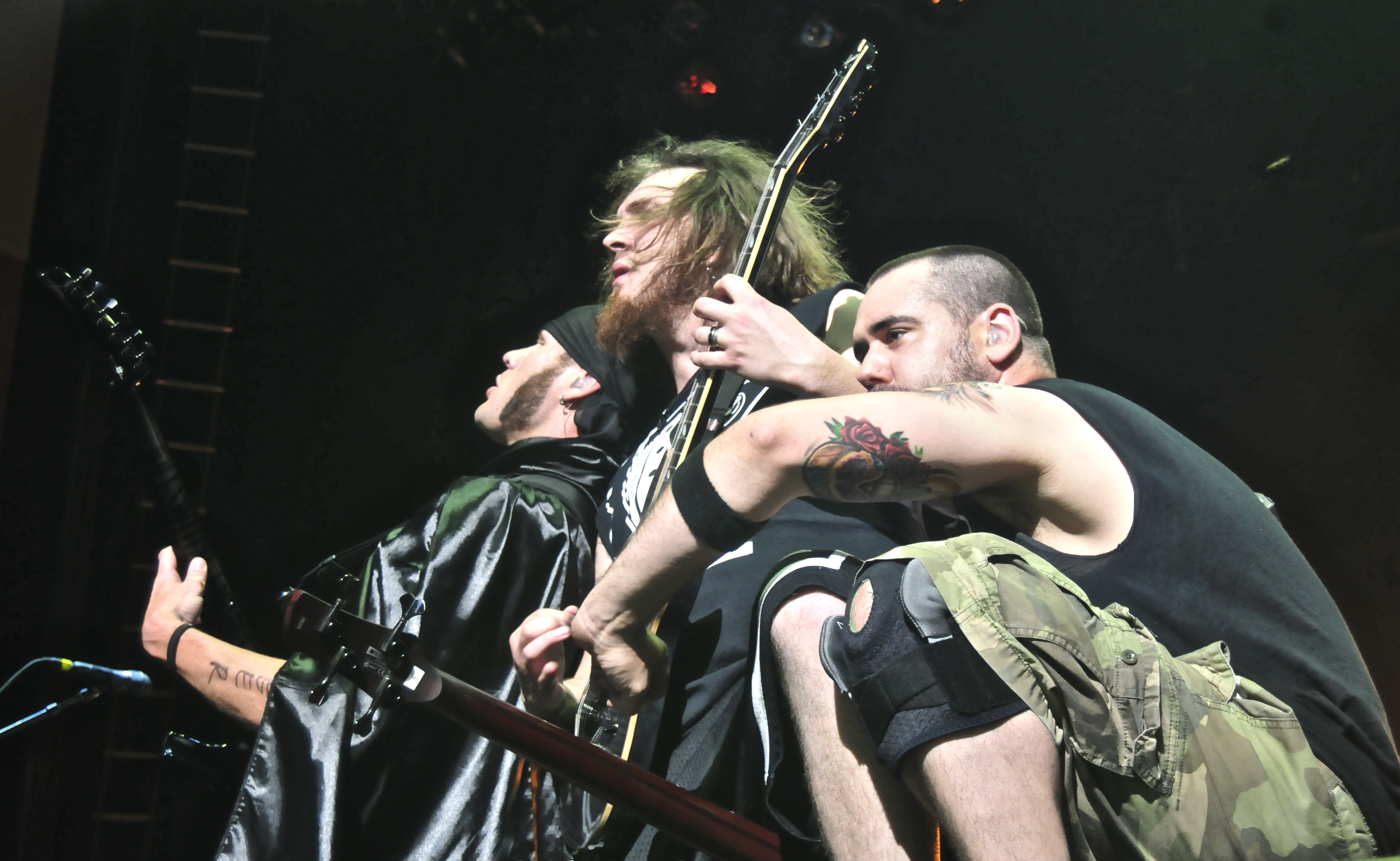
Melodic metalcore band Killswitch Engage performing in 2009.

In 2002, Killswitch Engage's Alive or Just Breathing reached number 37 on the Heatseekers Albums chart. In 2004, Killswitch Engage's The End of Heartache, Shadows Fall's The War Within, and Atreyu's The Curse peaked at numbers 21, 20, and 36 on the Billboard 200, respectively. Also, in 2006, Atreyu's third studio album, A Death-Grip On Yesterday peaked at number 9 on the Billboard 200, only to be followed up by 2007's Lead Sails Paper Anchor, which peaked at number 8. Atreyu's 2002 debut album Suicide Notes and Butterfly Kisses, as of 3 July 2004, has sold 107,000 copies in the United States. Killswitch Engage's 2004 album The End of Heartache and 2006 album As Daylight Dies were both certified gold by the Recording Industry Association of America (RIAA) in 2007 and 2009, respectively. Killswitch Engage's 2002 album Alive or Just Breathing, as of 3 July 2004, has sold 114,000 copies in the United States. Unearth began to have success among heavy metal fans in 2004 with the release of their second album The Oncoming Storm, which peaked at number 1 on the Heatseekers Albums chart on 17 July 2004. On that same day, the album peaked at number 105 on the Billboard 200. Unearth's 2006 album III: In the Eyes of Fire peaked at number 35 on the Billboard 200. The band's 2008 album The March peaked at number 45 on the Billboard 200. Oncoming Storm, III: In the Eyes of Fire', and The March peaked at numbers 6, 2 and 3 on the Independent nt Albums chart, respectively.

Avenged Sevenfold's first two albums Sounding the Seventh Trumpet (2001) and Waking the Fallen (2003) were also both metalcore albums. On the band's 2005 album City of Evil, Avenged Sevenfold moved away from metalcore and changed to a traditional heavy metal sound. On 15 June 2005, Blabbermouth.net reported that Waking the Fallen has sold 172,253 copies in the United States, according to Nielsen SoundScan. On 17 July 2009, Waking the Fallen was certified gold by the RIAA.

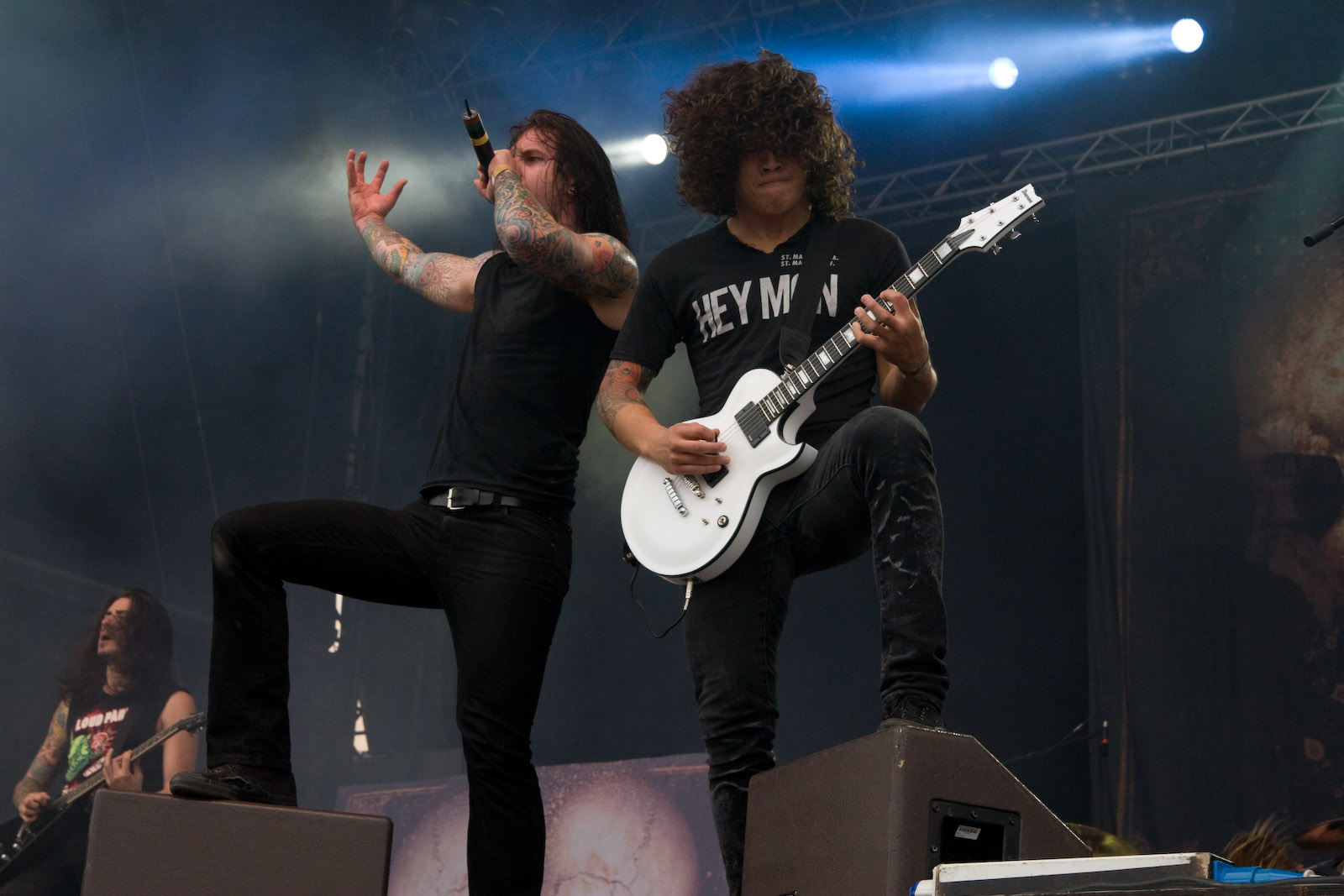
As I Lay Dying live at With Full Force 2007.

Trivium also achieved success among heavy metal fans when their 2005 album Ascendancy peaked at number 151 on the Billboard 200. Their albums The Crusade (2006) and Shogun (2008) peaked at numbers 25 and 23 on the Billboard 200, respectively. Bleeding Through's 2006 album The Truth peaked at number 1 on the Independent Albums chart on 28 January 2006. On that same day, the album peaked at number 48 on the Billboard 200. Metalcore band As I Lay Dying also achieved success among heavy metal fans. The band's 2005 album Shadows Are Security peaked at number 35 on the Billboard 200 and sold 263,000 copies, according to Nielsen SoundScan. As I Lay Dying's 2007 album An Ocean Between Us peaked at number 8 on the Billboard 200 in 2007. As of April 2005, As I Lay Dying's 2003 album Frail Words Collapse sold 118,000 copies in the United States. All That Remains achieved success with their 2006 album The Fall of Ideals, which, as of 1 October 2008, sold 175,000 copies in the United States. All That Remains' 2008 album Overcome peaked at number 16 on the Billboard 200. Overcome's song "Two Weeks" peaked at number 9 on the Mainstream Rock Songs chart on 16 May 2009. Bullet for My Valentine's debut album The Poison was released in October 2005 in Europe and was released in February 2006 in the United States. On 26 July 2006, Blabbermouth.net reported that The Poison has sold 72,000 copies in the United States. On 27 October 2007, Blabbermouth.net reported that The Poison has sold 336,000 copies in the United States. On 3 April 2010, Billboard reported that The Poison sold 573,000 copies in the United States. The Poison was certified gold by the RIAA on 30 January 2009. Bullet for My Valentine's second album Scream Aim Fire, released in 2008, peaked at number 4 on the Billboard 200 and sold 360,000 copies in the United States. Bullet for My Valentine's 2010 album Fever peaked at number 3 on the Billboard 200, selling 71,000 copies in the United States during its first week of release. Fever's song "Your Betrayal" peaked at number 25 on the Bubbling Under Hot 100 chart.

==== Diversification ====
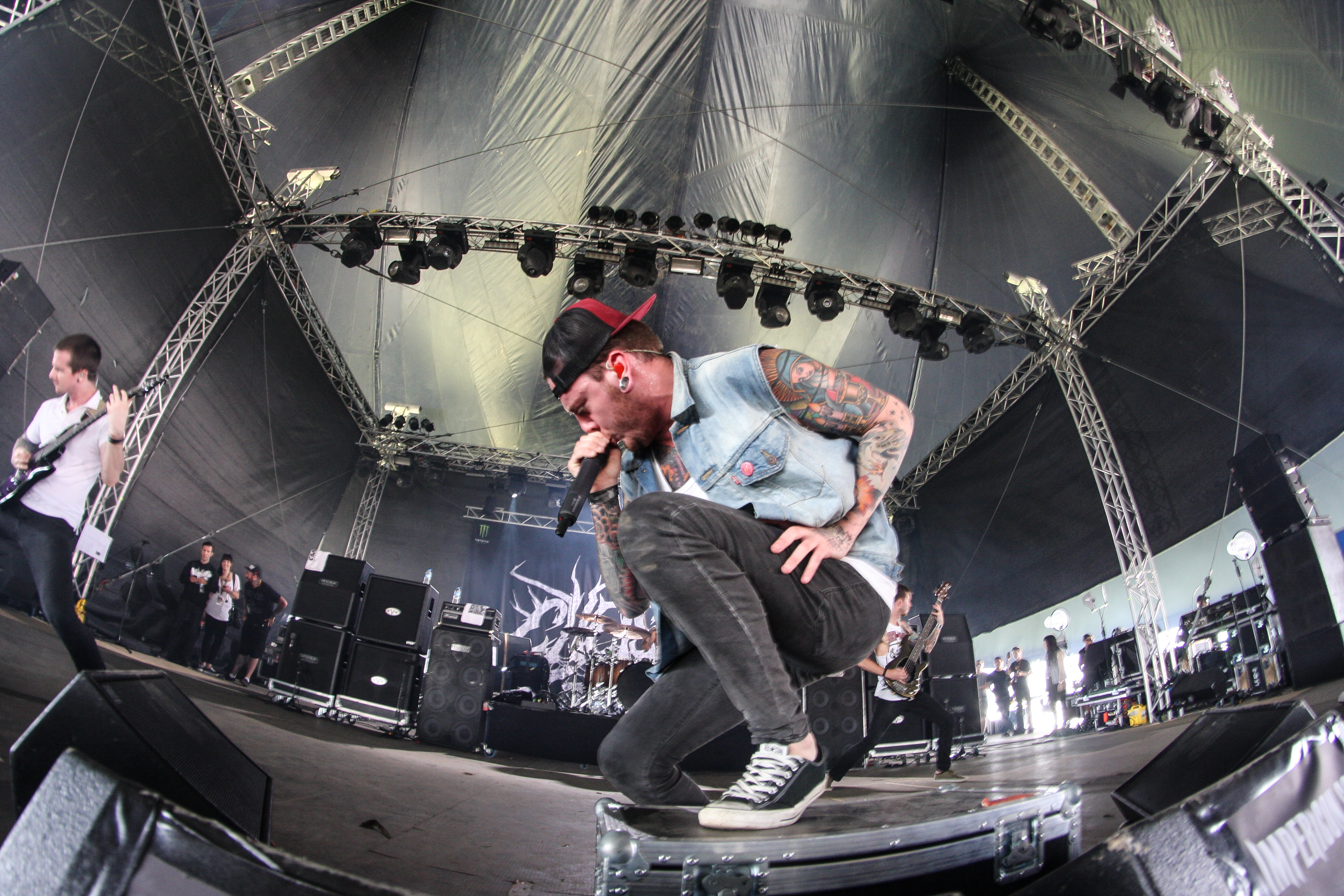
Deathcore band Chelsea Grin

As the decade progressed, metalcore became increasingly tied to the social media Myspace, launched in 2003, and the scene subculture that was prominent on the platform. Marketing through Myspace launched the careers of many of the era's most prominent bands including Bring Me the Horizon, Attack Attack!, Black Veil Brides, Bullet for My Valentine, Job For a Cowboy and Suicide Silence. Despite the stylistic distinctness between many of these groups' sounds they became encompassed by the terms "myspace-core" and "scene-core". Many went on to become fixtures at Warped Tour, and Fearless Records's Punk Goes... cover series.

Deathcore is a fusion of metalcore and death metal. Deathcore is defined by breakdowns, blast beats and death metal riffs. Bands may also incorporate guitar solos and even riffs that are influenced by metalcore. New York-based death metal group Suffocation is credited as one of the main influences for the emergence of deathcore. Embodyments album "Embrace The Eternal" is a foundation for the modern Deathcore sound. Some examples of deathcore bands are Suicide Silence, Whitechapel, Knights of the Abyss, Carnifex and Chelsea Grin.

In 2006 and 2007, a wave of metalcore bands strongly influenced by death metal dubbed deathcore gained moderate popularity. Notable bands that brought the genre to the fore include Bring Me the Horizon and Suicide Silence. Suicide Silence's No Time to Bleed peaked at number 32 on the Billboard 200, number 12 on the Rock Albums Chart and number 6 on the Hard Rock Albums Chart, while their album The Black Crown peaked at number 28 on the Billboard 200, number 7 on the Rock Albums Chart and number 3 on the Hard Rock Albums Chart. After its release, Whitechapel's album This Is Exile sold 5,900 in copies, which made it enter the Billboard 200 chart at position 118. Their self-titled album peaked at number 65 on the Canadian Albums Chart and also at number 47 on the Billboard 200. Their third album A New Era of Corruption sold about 10,600 copies in the United States in its first week of being released and peaked at position number 43 on the Billboard 200 chart. Furthermore, Bring Me the Horizon won the 2006 Kerrang! Awards for Best British Newcomer after they released their 2006 debut record Count Your Blessings. However, Bring Me the Horizon abandoned the deathcore genre after the release of this album. San Diego natives Carnifex, witnessed success with their first album Dead in My Arms, selling 5,000 copies with little publicity. On top of their non-stop touring and methodical songwriting resulted in Carnifex quickly getting signed to label Victory Records. Lastly, Australian deathcore band Thy Art Is Murder debuted at number 35 on the ARIA Charts with their album Hate (2012) making them the first extreme metal band to ever reach the Top 40 of this chart.

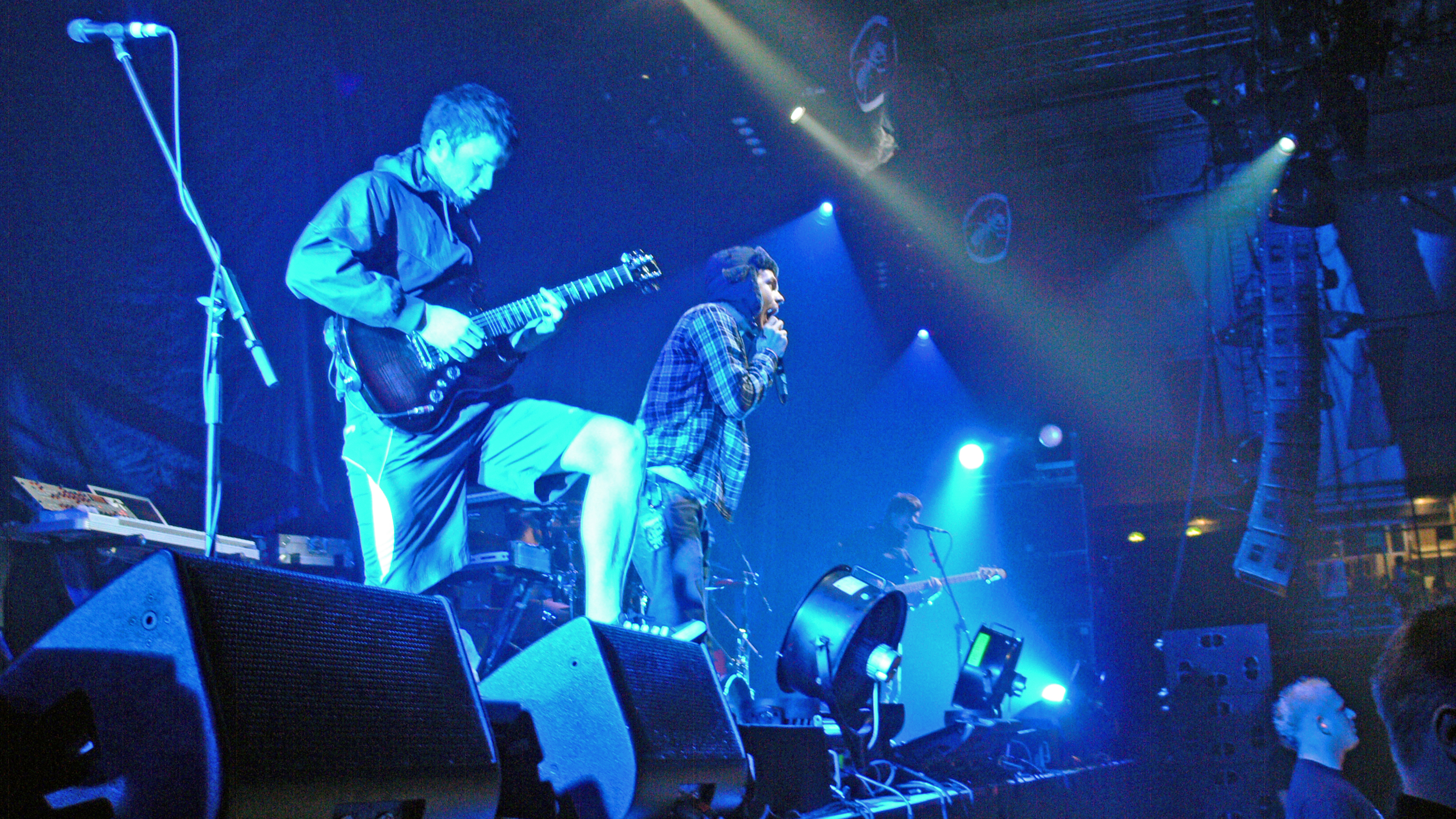
Enter Shikari performing in 2009

Electronicore's merger of metalcore with various electronic music styles emerged in the 2000s. One of the earliest contributors to the sound was St Albans band Enter Shikari. Their debut album Take to the Skies peaked at number on the Official UK Album Chart selling 28,000 copies in its first week and was certified Gold in the UK after selling over 100,000 copies. It was also the first album to achieve a significant chart success for a new act operating outside the traditional label system. The group received international radio airplay and a substantial number of musical awards, from Kerrang!, NME, Rock Sound and the BT Digital Music Awards. Their second album Common Dreads was released in June 2009 and debuted on the UK Albums Chart at 16. Columbus, Ohio's Attack Attack! gained significant notoriety with their Enter Shikari-influenced sound. The band's song for "Stick Stickly", the lead single from Someday Came Suddenly (2008) went viral online for its use of autotune and synths, with the members' squatting "crab walk" stance during the music video giving way to the crabcore meme. Warren, Michigan band I See Stars's debut album 3-D debuted at number 176 on the Billboard 200, number 5 on Top Heatseekers, and number 22 on Top Independent Albums. The Devil Wears Prada's 2011 album Dead Throne (which sold 32,400 in its first week) reached number 10 on the Billboard 200 chart. Asking Alexandria also achieved success, with their 2009 song "Final Episode (Let's Change the Channel)" being certified gold by the RIAA. The band's 2011 album Reckless & Relentless peaked at number 9 on the Billboard 200.

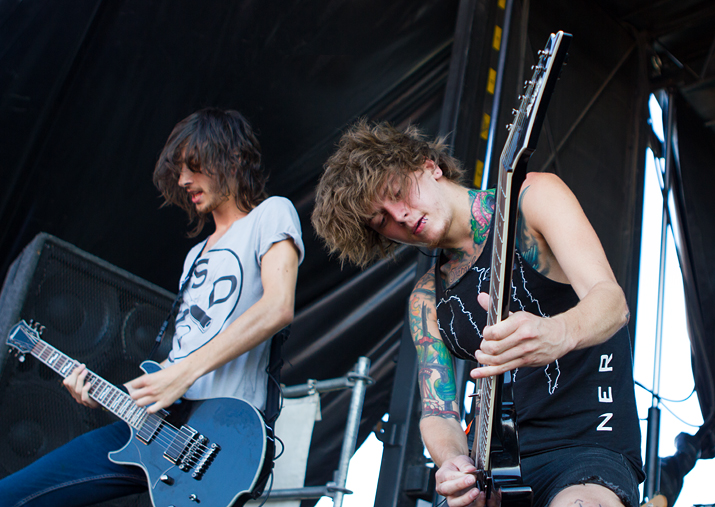
Asking Alexandria on the Warped Tour 2011.

In the late 2000s, a wave of groups began to gain traction cross-pollinating the metalcore style of bands like Shai Hulud and Misery Signals, with the influence of traditional hardcore and melodic hardcore groups like Killing the Dream. This wave often made use of serious, solemn lyrics and sometimes clean vocals in addition to the commonplace screams. Music commentators including Stuff You Will Hate, Alternative Press and Bradley Zorgdrager of Exclaim! used the name "serious hardcore" or "srscore" to refer to this style. Groups in this wave included Hundredth, For the Fallen Dreams , the Ghost Inside, Counterparts and Stick to Your Guns.

=== Continued success: 2010s ===
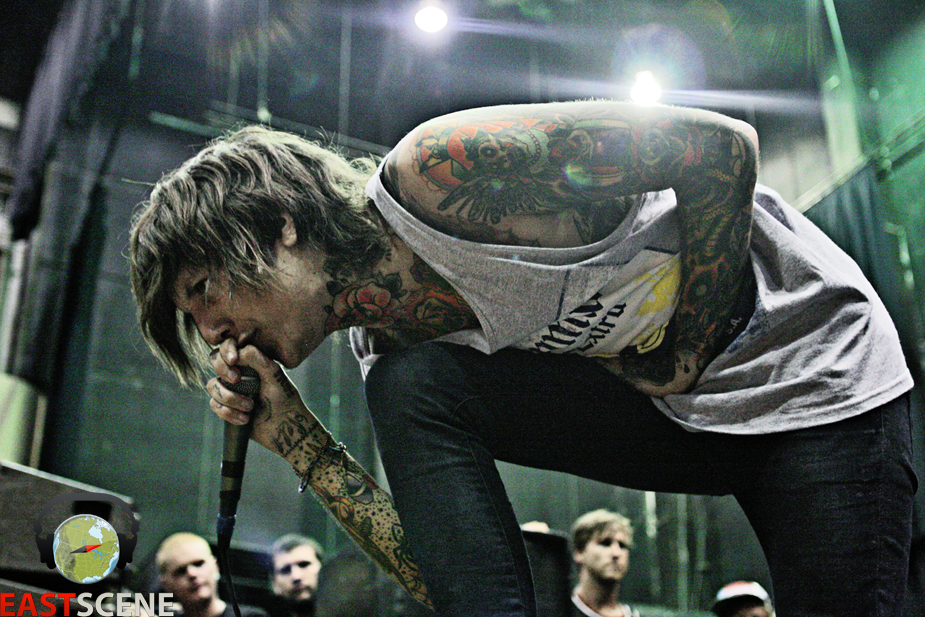
Bring Me the Horizon's 2013 album Sempiternal was highly influential on metalcore in the 2010s

Architects and Bring Me the Horizon spearheaded the British metalcore scene of the late 2000s and early 2010s. Architects had begun as a mathcore band on Nightmares (2006) before moving into metalcore by the release of Ruin (2007). Hysteria magazine credited the band's long time vocalist Sam Carter with reviving high pitched screamed vocals in metalcore and "influencing an entire generation of acts such as Polaris, In Hearts Wake, Void of Vision, Invent Animate, Imminence...the list goes on", as well as popularising the "blegh" adlib, which subsequently became commonplace in the genre. Bring Me the Horizon's third album There Is a Hell Believe Me I've Seen It. There Is a Heaven Let's Keep It a Secret. (2010), saw the band incorporate electronica, classical music and pop music into their metalcore style, a trend then continued further on Sempiternal (2013), which also embraced elements of nu metal. The Latter peaked at number 3 on the UK albums chart, and was one of the earliest releases by a UK metalcore band on a major label, through RCA Records. Following this, many bands in the metalcore scene began to emulate the sound these albums. The band's massive mainstream success led publications such as the Guardian and the Independent to accredit them as "the new Metallica", and Metal Hammer writer Stephen Hill to call Sempiternal "this generation's definitive metal album".

The nu metal elements present on Sempiternal, as well as Suicide Silence's The Black Crown (2012), led to a wave of bands in the mid-2010s taking influence from nu metal. My Ticket Home's Strangers Only (2013) was a notable precedent of this wave, seeing a previously established metalcore act merge their style with dark, nu metal influence to help establish the coming nu metalcore sound. Issues' merger of nu metal, metalcore and contemporary R&B gained them significant commercial success, with a number of publications crediting them as ushering a new wave of nu metal. Their debut self-titled album (2014) peaked at number nine on the Billboard 200 chart and their second album Headspace (2016) reached number one on the Top Alternative Albums chart. Furthermore, Bring Me the Horizon's fifth album That's the Spirit (2015) saw the band fully embrace nu metal, which peaked at number 2 in both the UK and US. In the following years Emmure, Of Mice & Men, Sworn In and DangerKids had all embraced the genre, and by 2016, nu metalcore had solidified itself as a movement.

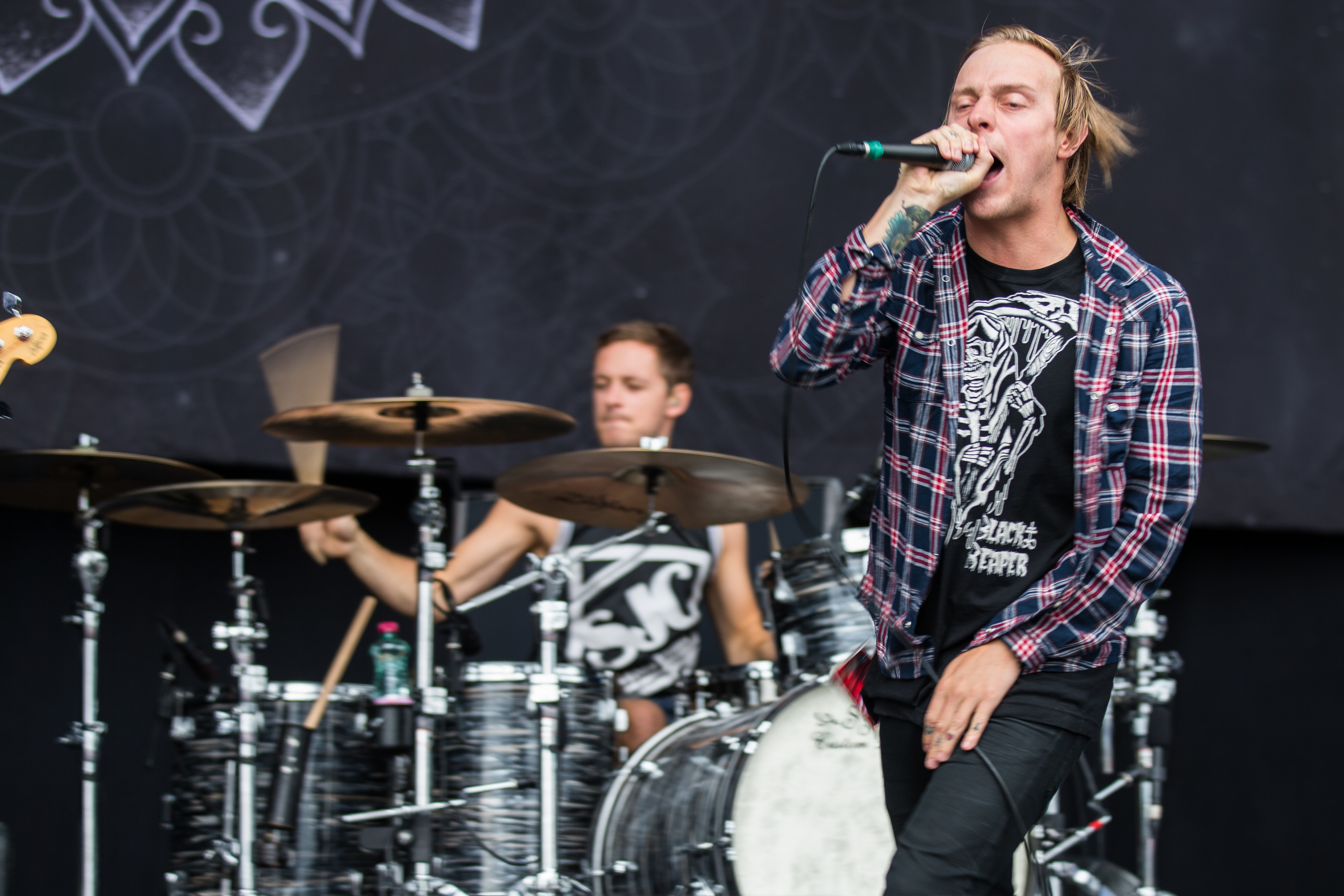
Architects were one of the most prominent metalcore bands in the 2010s

Architect's All Our Gods Have Abandoned Us (2016) was released to critical acclaim, with Metal Hammer writer Stephen Hill called it "as close to a perfect metal record as one can imagine". The following year, they released the single "Doomsday", their first release since the death of the band's founding guitarist Tom Searle. In the years following the single's release, the song's sound became widely imitated within the metalcore scene, particularly the song's introduction guitar riff.

During the 2010s, it became a popular trend for metalcore bands to cover pop songs. Examples of bands who are known for doing this include Of Mice & Men, Woe, Is Me, A Day to Remember, August Burns Red and Haste the Day. Many of the most influential and commercially successful of these were a part of Fearless Records's compilation album series Punk Goes... (2000–2019). Following the series' end, Our Last Night gained mainstream commercial success with their cleaner production, utilitarian take on the trend.

As the decade drew to a close, a new wave of bands in the genre emerged who harkened back to the metallic hardcore sound of bands from the 1990s. Vein.fm, Code Orange, Knocked Loose, Varials, Jesus Piece, Counterparts and Kublai Khan were all notable groups who gained significant success within the genre at the time. Code Orange saw critical acclaim and success with their Roadrunner Records debut Forever in 2017. Forever's title track was also nominated Grammy for Best Metal Performance in 2018. It too embraced the influence of nu metal and according to PopMatters writer Ethan Stewart, led to nu metalcore becoming "one of the most prominent flavors of contemporary metal". Knocked Loose gained significant attention after their song "Counting Worms" from their album Laugh Tracks (2016) became a meme due to its "arf arf" mosh call. The band's 2019 second album A Different Shade of Blue also received critical and commercial success.

=== Further diversification: 2020s–present ===
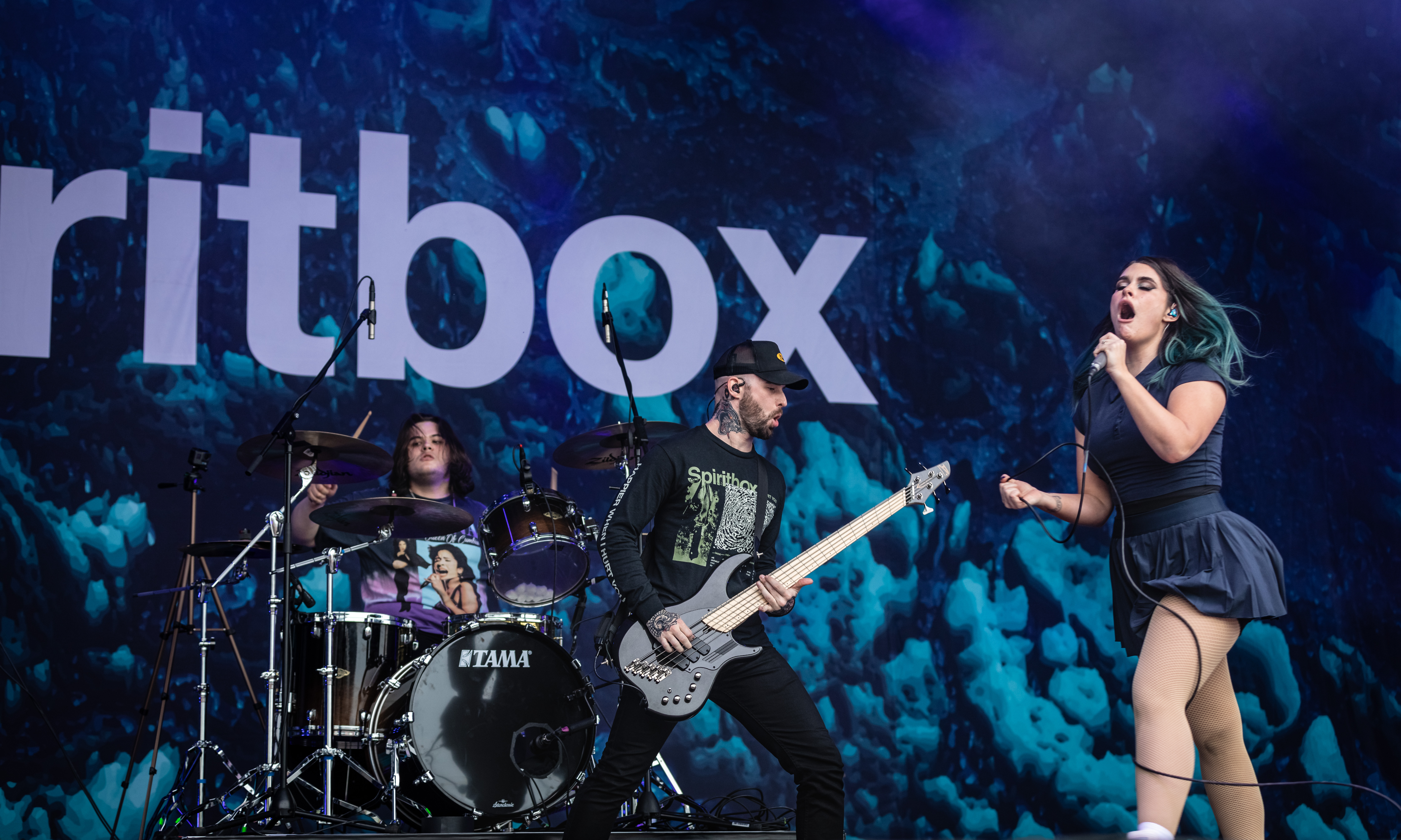
Spiritbox performing in 2022

Nu metalcore maintained its prominence into the 2020s with Tetrarch and Tallah gaining notability. Loathe's second album I Let It In and It Took Everything (2020) saw critical acclaim, and was consistently praised for expanding the scope of metalcore by incorporating elements of nu metal, shoegaze, emo, post-rock, progressive metal and industrial music. The band's use of the Fender Bass VI guitar, which tunes to an octave below a standard tuning guitar, became widely sought after following the album's release. Publications credited Spiritbox similarly with Metal Hammer calling them "post-metalcore" and "genre-fluid". The band's 2020 single "Holy Roller" reached the Top 40 on the Billboard Mainstream Rock chart, and their debut album Eternal Blue was named the year's best rock or metal album by Loudwire and metalcore album by Metal Hammer.

Around the same time, a number of bands gained prominence in the scene that revived the sound of groups from the mid-to-late-2000s, fronted by Static Dress, SeeYouSpaceCowboy, If I Die First and CrazyEightyEight. This movement grew out of both the hardcore scene and the mainstream success that the emo rap scene gained the late-2010s.

Formed in 2015, Bad Omens' third album The Death of Peace of Mind (2022) was the band's commercial breakthrough after viral success of the album's second single "Just Pretend" on TikTok which then topped the Billboard Mainstream Rock chart. By March 2023, the album had received 20 million streams on Spotify, leading to Metal Hammer calling them "the biggest metalcore band in a generation." Bring Me the Horizon's Post Human: Survival Horror (2020) and Architects' For Those That Wish to Exist (2021) both also reached number one in the UK album charts.

== Reception and legacy ==
Metalcore is not universally accepted in heavy metal and hardcore circles, and there has been debate and disagreement over whether metalcore is an authentic subgenre of heavy metal. Traditional metalheads tend to view metalcore as an inauthentic imitation of "real" metal, and "a diluted misinterpretation of metal's stylistic codes" by outsiders. Fans of traditional death metal accused deathcore bands of stylistic misappropriation. Eli Enis of Stereogum referred to post-2010 metalcore bands who developed a sleeker and poppier style, saying

"because of the way those bands dressed ... and the distinct lack of conventional metal elements in their sound (no guitar solos, mindlessly simplistic riffs, plasticky production that eschewed metal's raw power) many metalheads viewed that cadre of metalcore as an abomination that was barely deserving of its 'metal' membership".

Metalcore and extreme metal bands often play at the same festivals, but they use conflicting tropes in their lyrics and imagery and attract different types of fans. Metalheads, for example, have expressed frustration with what they call a more overt, macho 'bro' posturing in metalcore scenes.

In the early 2000s, metalcore bands drew criticism for "their increasingly considered images, polished production, and what was seen as appeal to progressively more mainstream audiences". Despite several metalcore bands achieving critical acclaim, several journalists noted that the metalcore tag earned a "bad rep" after several bands in the genre found commercial success, or released albums with highly polished production. Andrew Sacher of Brooklyn Vegan wrote that "the mainstream boom tarnished the word 'metalcore' for a while." Stephen Hill of Metal Hammer suggested that later metalcore bands such as Attila and Blessthefall have "more in common with airbrushed, cynically-minded boy bands than the melding of two counter-cultures." Eli Enis referred to mainstream pop-oriented metalcore bands as "commercial-core".

Several bands and musicians labelled as metalcore have rejected the term, and even some who accept the term nonetheless insist that the style has become "bastardized" by commercialism and trends. Alex Varkatzas of Atreyu expressed his distaste for many of the clean vocal parts in modern metalcore songs: "It's got really whiny. The melodic vocals are super-fucking whiny and annoying in a lot of bands and I don't like that shit. [...] You can sing and have clean vocals, and make it really fucking powerful".

Critics and journalists have noted the increased presence of ballads on modern metalcore albums, claiming that the "punk rock spirit [is] long gone" from the genre. Stephen Hill of Metal Hammer assessed, "Killswitch Engage became something akin to the Metallica of metalcore, enjoying continued success whilst others dwindled but, with Howard Jones taking the mic from Jess Leach, becoming more hard rock and ballad-heavy with each new album." Journalists have also noted many later metalcore bands lacking hardcore punk influence entirely. Many of the genre's more commercially successful acts, such as All That Remains, Asking Alexandria, Of Mice & Men and Bring Me the Horizon, eventually abandoned their metalcore roots, opting for what has been described as a "more radio-friendly rock- and pop-inclined" approach. Stephen Hill of Metal Hammer said: "To onlookers from the outside, metalcore was dead, a one dimensional flash in the pan to go alongside glam and nu-metal in the 'what were we thinking?' Fads of alternative culture." In the opinion of Bryan Rolli of Loudwire, many bands stop playing metalcore in favor of "dad rock" due to health risks associated with screaming vocals, calling the style "a young musician's game". He wrote: "Those larynx-shredding screams [...] are the result of youthful vitriol and a complete lack of inhibition (and, often, a lack of proper musical training). Millennial metalcore classics such as Avenged Sevenfold's Waking the Fallen and Bullet for My Valentine's The Poison were not necessarily written with longevity in mind."

Writing for Metal Hammer, Doc Coyle of God Forbid said, "not only has the metalcore genre thrived, it has become the biggest subgenre in heavy music, expanding its sonic palette to include nu metal, radio rock, hip hop, EDM and, of course, pop". Likewise, in the opinion of Ultimate Guitar staff writer Jorge Martins:

"Metalcore became, through its almost three decades of existence, arguably the most popular subgenre of heavy music, finding its way across all styles of metal and influencing an endless number of artists and landmark releases. One of the secrets for its seemingly never-ending vitality is how well it gels with other styles in order to never grow stale and keep its relevance when some of their contemporaries pushed their boundaries as far as they would go and ended up spitting out formulaic albums and falling into oblivion as Metalcore thrived then and now."

== See also ==
- List of metalcore bands

== Bibliography ==
- Haenfler, Ross. Straight Edge: Clean-living Youth, Hardcore Punk, and Social Change, Rutgers University Press. ISBN 0-8135-3852-1.
- Mudrian, Albert (2000). Choosing Death: The Improbable History of Death Metal and Grindcore. Feral House. ISBN 1-932595-04-X.
- Sharpe-Young, Garry (2005). New Wave of American Heavy Metal. Zonda Books. ISBN 0-9582684-0-1.
- Giordano, James (2016). Maldynia: Multidisciplinary Perspectives on the Illness of Chronic Pain. CRC Press. ISBN 9781439836316.
