= Crabcore =

Internet meme

"Crabcore" squatting featured in the music video for "Stick Stickly" by metalcore group Attack Attack!

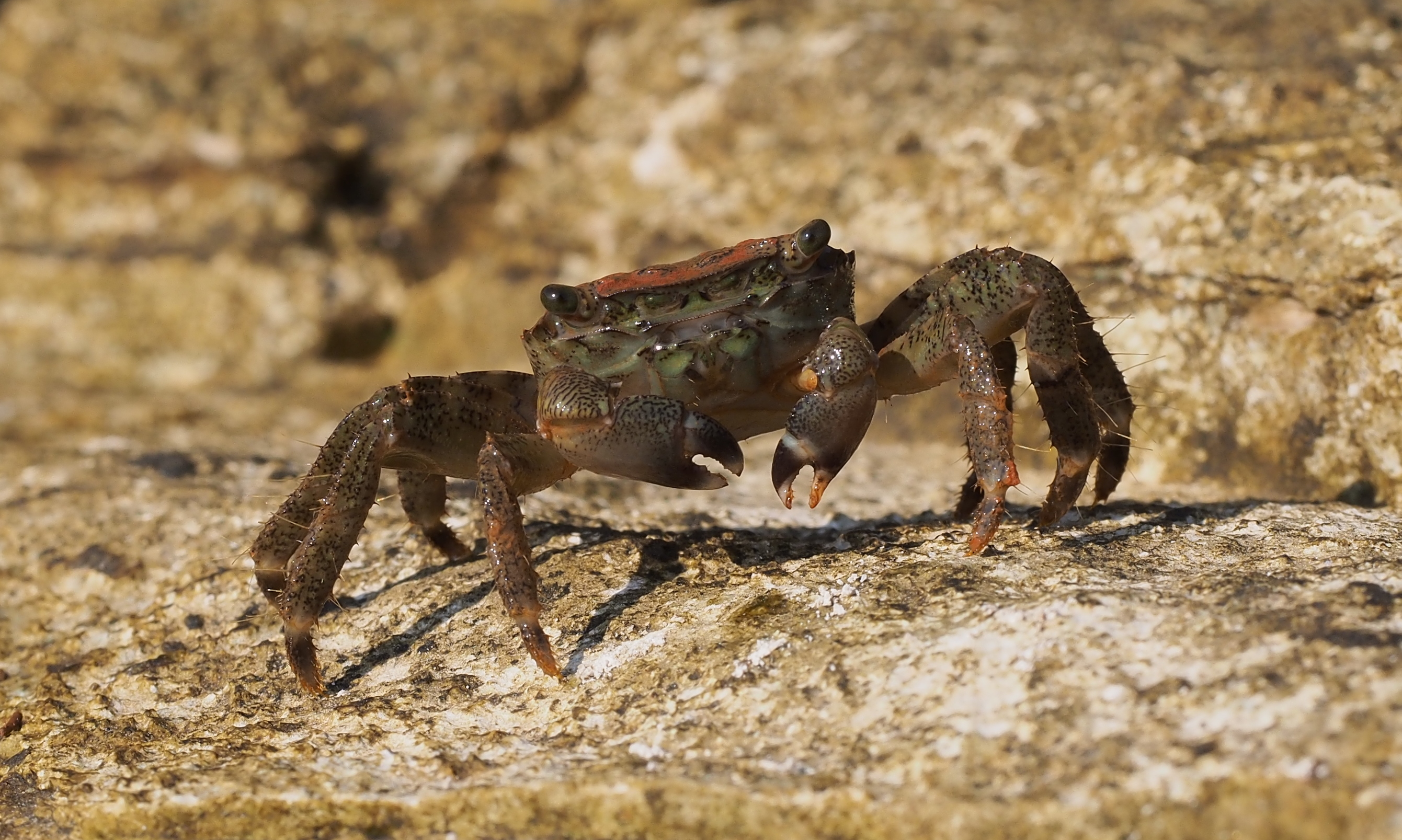
Pachygrapsus marmoratus on the Adriatic Sea coastline

Crabcore is an internet meme that originated in 2007, mocking metalcore guitarists who squat low with their legs spread in a "crab-like" stance while performing. It has been mimicked by a variety of musical groups, leading many magazines and agencies, such as Rolling Stone, Houston Press, and NPR to classify it as a jocular musical style, or microgenre.

== Origin and legacy ==
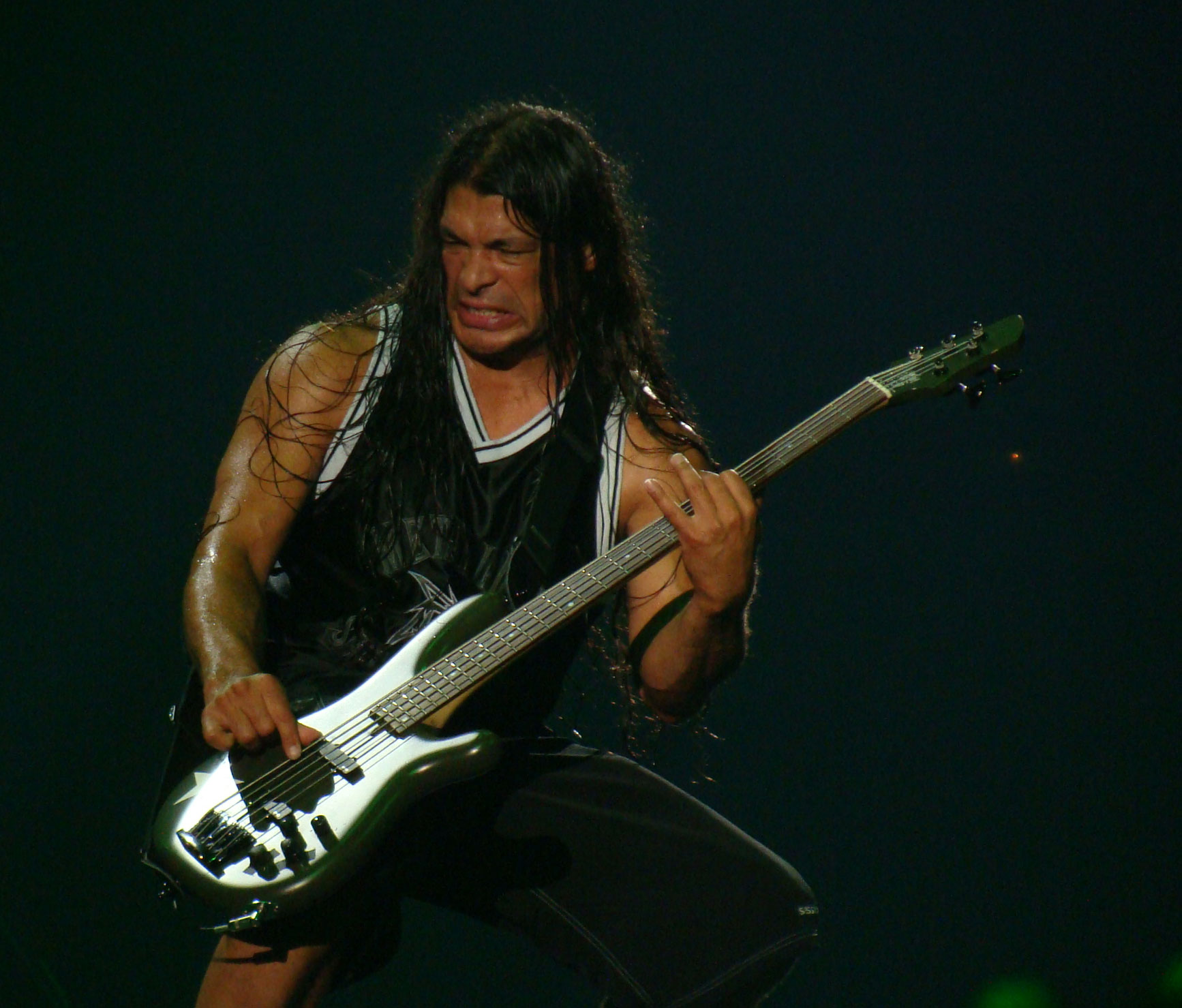
Bassist Robert Trujillo performing a "crab walk" for fans

"Crabcore" originated in late 2007, and was first seen in a live performance by Blessthefall. While performing "Higinia", former lead singer Craig Mabbitt is seen squatting, almost in a “crab-like” way during the breakdown.

However, the term "crabcore" was later popularized in reference to the Ohio metalcore band Attack Attack!, who featured a "crab-like" dance during breakdowns in their music video for the 2009 single "Stick Stickly" from the album Someday Came Suddenly. Norwegian black metal musician Abbath of the band Immortal is similarly known for crouching and walking in a similar fashion to that of a crab during the band's performances and music videos. Metallica bassist Robert Trujillo is also known for a similar stance during the band's live concerts, long before the popularization of the term "crabcore".

In an interview with former Attack Attack! vocalist Caleb Shomo, Rolling Stone reporter Kory Grow referred to crabcore as a musical genre; Shomo, however, said he found the term "hilarious" and the band was "just being dumb". The Phoenix New Times criticized "Stick Stickly" for its abrupt transitions and auto-tuned vocals, and stated that "crabcore" is "probably not a real genre". According to John McDonnell of The Guardian:

"Unlike all the other genres covered in this column, crabcore isn't defined by sonics or BPMs or lyrical content, or tied to a geographic location. Crabcore is defined by the body contortions of the band's guitarists when they perform. This is the lolloping crab-like stance adopted while a guitar player shreds, and it's not dissimilar to a sumo wrestler having extreme muscle spasms while readying themselves to engage with an opponent."

Music associated with "crabcore" and the use of the term itself has been met with criticism. On July 13, 2009, former Attack Attack! vocalist Nick Barham was asked about crabcore in an interview with Hardtimes, and said that the band has embraced the meme as a publicity stunt. In a 2010 interview with Village Voice Media, the band reiterated "people call us crabcore ... we just roll with it, it's funny." Attack Attack!'s second album peaked at No. 26 on the Billboard 200, prompting Metal Insider reporter Zach Shaw to write "Crabcore reached this high on the charts? Indeed a sad day."

In 2011, the animated sitcom South Park episode You're Getting Old aired, parodying "tween wave" music, possibly referring to "crabcore". In 2016, Abandon All Ships' bassist Martin Broda tweeted "#defendcrabcore" just prior to the release of their single "Loafting". Members of the extreme metal band Allegaeon often perform dressed in crab costumes and imitate the typical stance. Many other bands have been referred to as "crabcore" for featuring a similar stance or musical style, including Asking Alexandria and This Romantic Tragedy. Crabcore has sometimes been associated with electronicore characteristics, auto-tuned vocals, and excessive breakdowns "one after the other". Merchandise featuring the meme is sold online, including a shirt released by the Finnish metalcore band One Morning Left which reads "Finnish crabcore bitch!".

== See also ==
- Viral video
