= The Ghost of a Thousand =

English punk rock band

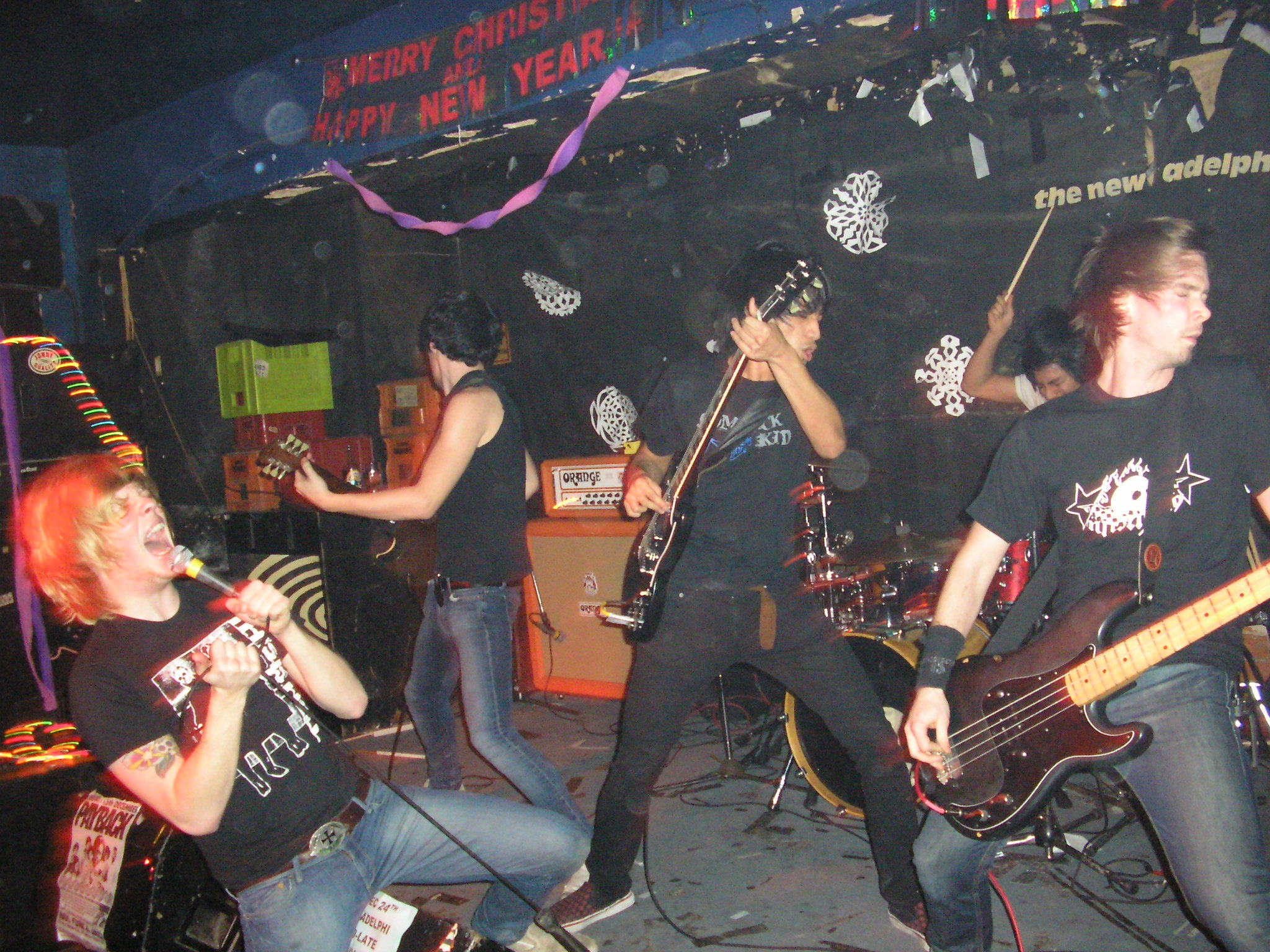
- The Ghost of a Thousand

Background information
- Origin: Brighton, England
- Genres: Hardcore punk; garage punk; post-hardcore
- Years active: 2004–2011, 2012
- Labels: Epitaph Records; Undergroove Records; Hideous Records
- Members: Tom Lacey; Memby Jago; Andy Blyth; Jag Jago; Gaz Spencer
- Past members: Gez Walton; Ed Warner

The Ghost of a Thousand were an English punk rock band from Brighton.

== Career ==
The Ghost of a Thousand formed in the Winter of 2004 in Brighton and began touring extensively, playing alongside Blood Red Shoes, Poison the Well, This is Hell, Gallows, Alexisonfire and Cancer Bats among others. In February 2007 the band released their debut album This is Where the Fight Begins on UK label Undergroove Records, and that summer they made their Reading and Leeds Festivals debut on the Lock-Up Stage. In October 2008 bassist Gez Walton left the band, at the time citing musical differences; however, Walton was in fact fired from the band. The band's previous bassist Gaz Spencer returned in his place.

In February 2009, the band announced they had signed with Epitaph Records, becoming the first British act to do so not solely for distribution. In June 2009 their second album New Hopes, New Demonstrations was released. The album, recorded in Stockholm with experienced producer Pelle Gunnerfeldt (Refused, The Hives), was described by vocalist Tom Lacey as "very heavy, heavier than This Is Where The Fight Begins, but its whole feel is a lot sadder." The band also played 3 songs for the BBC Radio 1 Rockshow at the Maida Vale studios. The band were due to play the Saturday headlining slot on the Red Bull stage at 2009's Download Festival, but pulled out due to family reasons. They went on to perform at Reading and Leeds festivals and Hevy Music Festival in 2009. They played the Rock Sound magazine sponsored stage at Guilfest 2009. They continued their extensive touring, culminating with the UK and European Eastpak sponsored Antidote Tour, alongside Alexisonfire, Anti-Flag and Four Year Strong. In March 2010, The Ghost of a Thousand appeared at the Texan music festival South by Southwest and continued their touring schedule with a European tour with Cancer Bats, performing at Groezrock then more recently with The Bronx.

On 31 March 2011, the band announced their break-up. Their then final performance together took place at 2011's Hevy Festival, playing alongside bands such as The Dillinger Escape Plan, Ceremony and Funeral for a Friend. On 17 October 2012, they were announced as support for the London dates of the Alexisonfire farewell tour, stating that "Ladies and Gentleman, we are proud to announce that we will be supporting Alexisonfire at London Brixton Academy Dec 2nd and 3rd. We feel that we owe them a great deal of gratitude and wouldn't want to turn them down and give them a proper farewell [sic]."

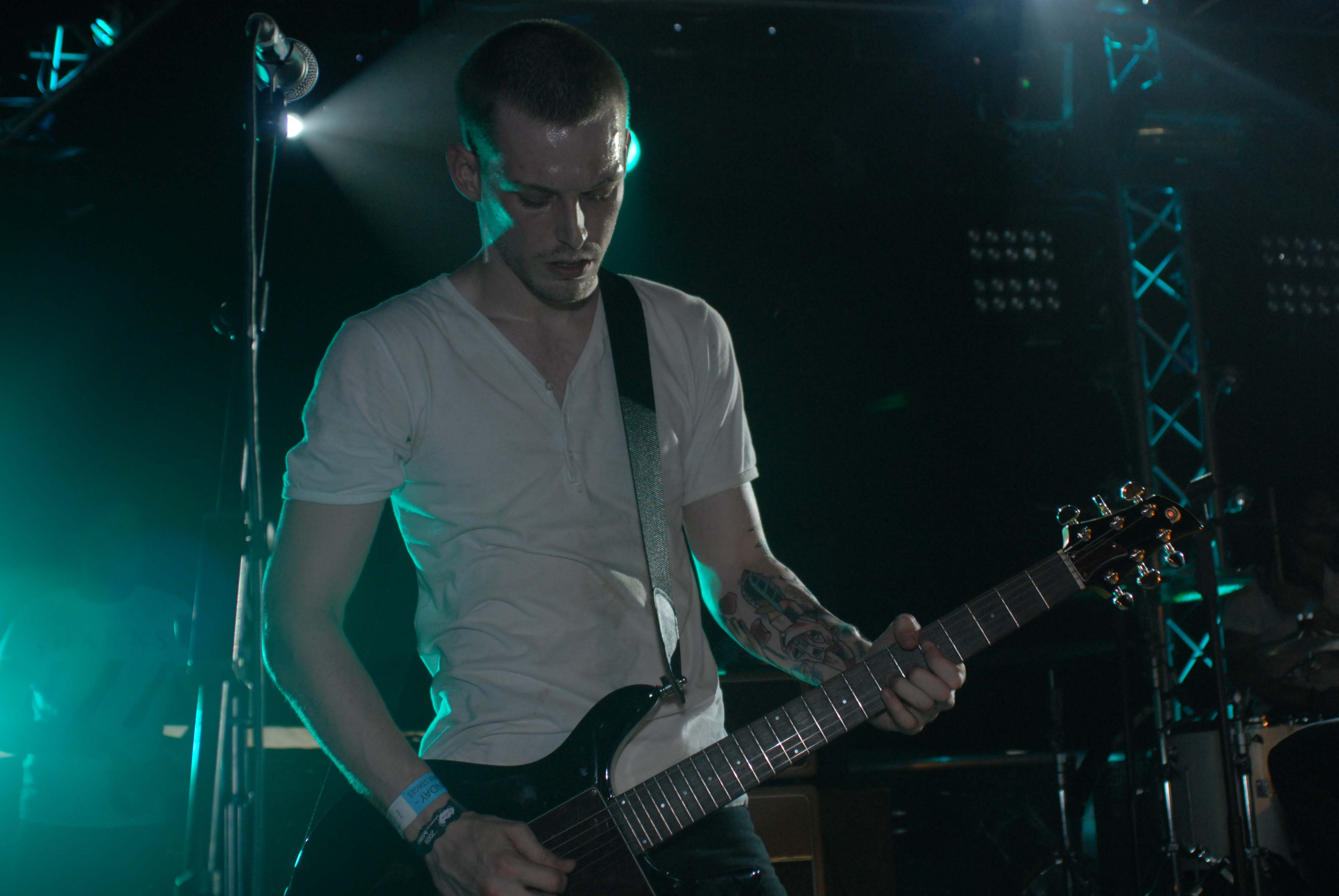

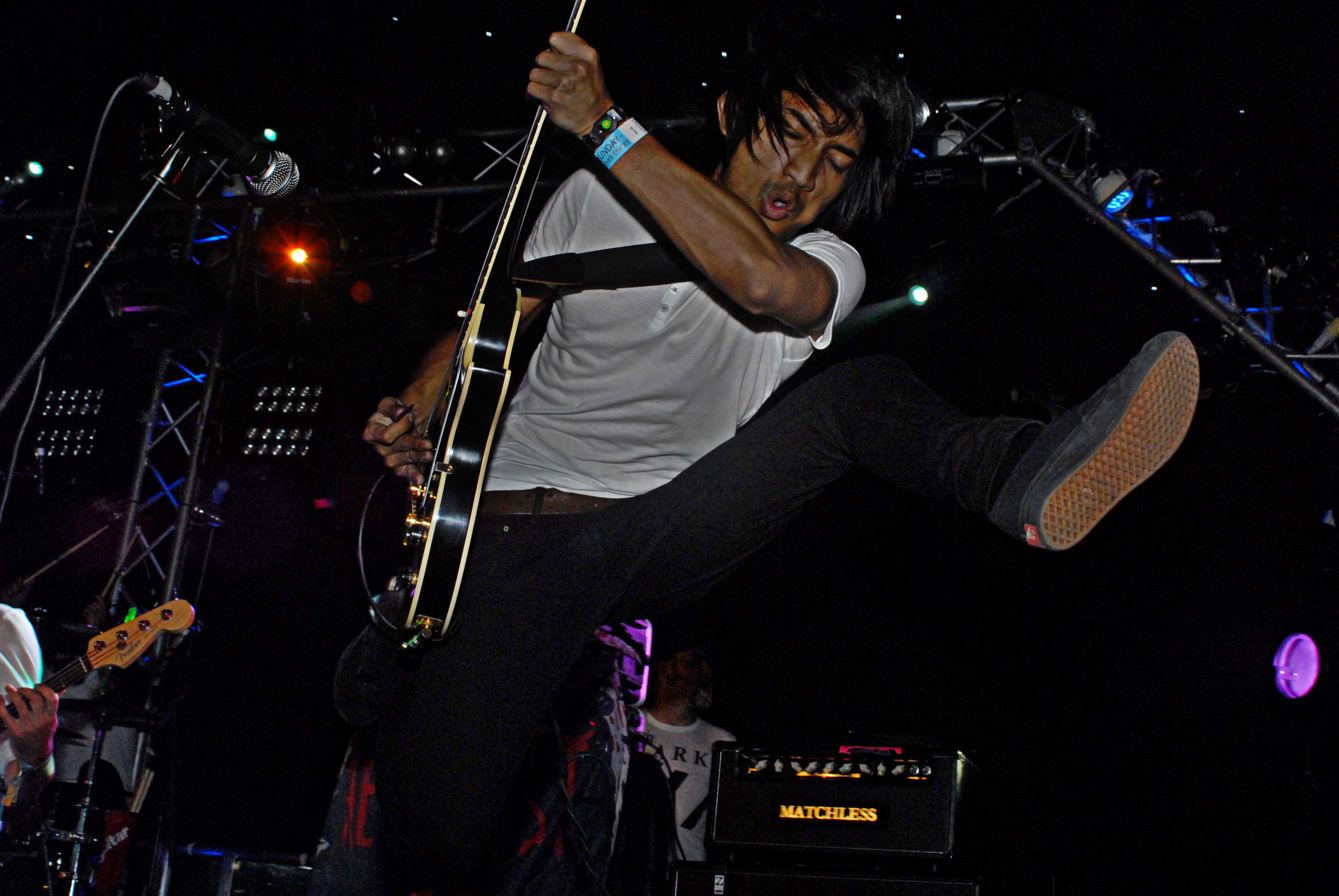

== Discography ==
=== Albums ===
Release date	Title	Label
19 February 2007	This Is Where the Fight Begins	Undergroove Records
1 June 2009	New Hopes, New Demonstrations	Epitaph Records

=== EPs ===
Release date	Title	Label
25 March 2008	TwoByThree EP	Hideous Records

=== Music videos ===
- "Black Art Number One" – December 2007
- "Bright Lights" – May 2009
- "Knees, Toes, Teeth" – September 2009
- "Fed to the Ocean" – March 2010

== Awards ==
- No. 6 Best Album of 2007 Critics Choice, Kerrang!
- Top 5 Metal Albums 2007, Q
- No. 11 Album of the Year, Rock Sound 2007
- Nominated for Best British Newcomer at the 2007 Kerrang! Awards
- Nominated for Best Live Band in Total Guitar 2008
- Nominated for Best British Band in Moher
- No. 7 Album of the Year, Rocksound 2009
- No. 16 Album of the year 2009 Kerrang!
