= New Hopes, New Demonstrations =

Studio album by The Ghost of a Thousand
- Released: June 1, 2009
- Recorded: November 2008 at Studio Gröndahl, Stockholm
- Genre: Hardcore punk Garage punk Post-hardcore
- Length: 34:07
- Label: Epitaph Records
- Producer: Pelle Gunnefeldt

The Ghost of a Thousand chronology
This is Where the Fight Begins (2007)	New Hopes, New Demonstrations (2009)

Professional ratings
Review scores
Source	Rating
CultureDeluxe	link
Kerrang!	4/5 stars
NME	7/10 stars
Q	4/5 stars
Rockmidgets.com	link
Rock Sound	9/10 stars
Thrash Hits	link
Total Guitar	4/5 stars

New Hopes, New Demonstrations is The Ghost of a Thousand's second full-length studio album. It is the band's first release on Epitaph Records. It received critical acclaim, being named the 7th Album of the year (2009) by Rock Sound and 16th by Kerrang! magazine.

== Track listing ==
No.	Title	Length
1.	"Moved as Mountains, Dreamt of By the Sea"	2:29
2.	"Bright Lights"	3:49
3.	"Knees, Toes, Teeth"	2:41
4.	"Canyons of Static"	2:52
5.	"Split the Atom"	3:15
6.	"Neptune"	2:49
7.	"Small Mercies"	1:17
8.	"Nobody Likes a Hero"	2:59
9.	"Running On Empty"	2:36
10.	"Fed to the Ocean"	3:32
11.	"Good Old Fashioned Loss"	6:29

== Band members ==
- Memby Jago – Drums/Backups
- Thomas Lacey – Vocals/Keys
- Jag Jago – Guitar/Backups
- Andrew Blyth – Guitar/Keys/Backups
- Gareth Spencer – Bass

== Credits ==
- Produced, Engineered and Mixed – Pelle Gunnerfeldt
- Assistant Engineer – Johan Gustafsson
- Assistant Mixing Engineer – Herman Söderström
- Recorded & Mixed in November 2008 at Studio Gröndahl, Stockholm
- Mastered by George Marino at Sterling Sound, NYC
- Saxophone on "Split The Atom" – Gustav Bendt
- All Songs & Lyrics – The Ghost Of A Thousand
- Published by Songs and Stories Worldwide
- Artwork & Layout – Thomas Lacey
- Band Photography – Greg Funnel

== Awards ==
- No. 7 Album of the Year 2009, Rocksound
- No. 16 Album of the Year 2009, Kerrang!
