= Bats (Irish band) =

Irish rock band

- Origin: Dublin, Ireland
- Genres: Post-punk, post-hardcore, math rock, progressive rock
- Years active: 2007–present
- Labels: Armed Ambitions, Richter Collective
- Members: Rupert Morris; Craig Potterton; Conor McIntyre; Timmy Moran; Noel Anderson
- Website: Bats.bandcamp.com

Bats is a five-piece rock band based in Dublin, Ireland. Formed in 2007, Bats plays a blend of post-punk, hardcore and math rock, with lyrics drawing heavily from science subject areas.

The debut EP Cruel Sea Scientist was released in 2007 on Armed Ambition. Since forming, the band also toured Ireland and the UK as support to These Arms Are Snakes, The Locust, Liars, Sebadoh, Chrome Hoof and Gang Gang Dance. They also toured the UK in 2009 with Blakfish, to support the release of the debut album Red in Tooth & Claw on Richter Collective. The album was recorded in Salem, Massachusetts, with Converge guitarist and producer Kurt Ballou.

In December 2009, the band featured in the Christmas issue of Rocksound, making No. 75 in the Top 75 Albums of 2009 list. On 26 March 2010, Bats supported And So I Watch You From Afar at their EP launch.

On 3 January 2012, Bats revealed that the title of their next album would be The Sleep of Reason. The album was released on 20 October and was the last LP release of The Richter Collective independent record label. Alter Nature was released independently in 2019, and is their most recent album.

== Discography ==
=== Albums ===
- Red in Tooth & Claw (2009)
- The Sleep of Reason (2012)
- Alter Nature (2019)

=== EP ===
- Cruel Sea Scientist (2007)
