= Undergroove Records =

Undergroove Records was founded as a British underground metal record label in 1998 by Darren Sadler. The label has since become much more open minded releasing everything from the post-rock of Aereogramme to the trip hop influenced grooves of 27.

== Current bands ==
- 27
- 3 Stages of Pain
- Aereogramme
- Aped Bi-Sapien
- Ariel-X
- B Movie Heroes
- Black Eye Riot
- Charger
- Co-Exist
- Cubic Space Division
- Down I Go
- Drive Like You Stole It
- Dweller
- Eden Maine
- Exit International
- The Mirimar Disaster
- GU Medicine
- Hexes
- Johnny Truant
- Lack
- Lazarus Blackstar
- Matter
- Minus the Bear
- My Ruin
- Servers
- Sika Redem
- Sorry and the Sinatras
- Spider Kitten
- Take a Worm for a Walk Week
- The Abominable Iron Sloth
- The Ghost of a Thousand
- The Murder of Rosa Luxemburg
- The Yo-Yo's
- Trashlight Vision
- Twin Zero

== See also ==
- List of record labels
- List of independent UK record labels
