= Johnny Franck =

American musician (born 1990)

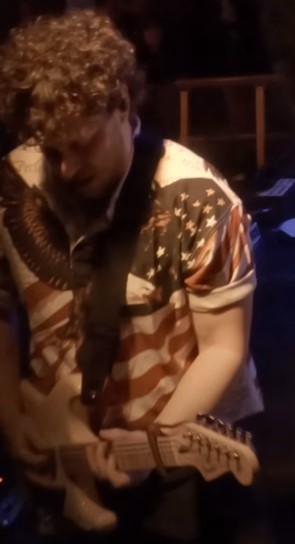
- Franck in 2024

Background information
- Also known as: Bilmuri
- Born: June 8, 1990 (age 36); Columbus, Ohio, U.S.
- Origin: Westerville, Ohio, U.S.
- Genres: Metalcore; electronicore; post-hardcore; acoustic; neon pop-punk; easycore
- Occupations: Singer-songwriter; musician; producer
- Instruments: Vocals; guitar
- Years active: 2005–present
- Label: Columbia
- Member of: Bilmuri
- Formerly of: Attack Attack!; Chayr; The March Ahead
- Website: bilmuri.com

John Franck (born June 8, 1990), also known as Bilmuri, is an American singer-songwriter, musician and producer. He is best known as the former clean vocalist and rhythm guitarist of Attack Attack!. He departed the band in 2010, and formed a new group called The March Ahead. In 2016, he began a new musical project under the name Bilmuri. Franck has also produced music for artists such as Dave Days and Jarrod Alonge.

== Early life ==
John Franck was born on June 8, 1990, in Columbus, Ohio. He was raised in Westerville, Ohio. He started playing music when he first received a guitar in sixth grade. In high school, he met and befriended Caleb Shomo.

== Career ==
=== 2005–2010: Attack Attack! ===
Franck, along with Andrew Whiting, Nick White and Andrew Wetzel met Austin Carlile while playing in local high school bands when they decided to form Attack Attack!. In November 2008, they released their debut studio album, Someday Came Suddenly, which featured Carlile on lead vocals, via Rise Records. The album debuted at number 193 on the Billboard 200, selling 3,600 copies in its first week. They released their self-titled second studio album on June 8, 2010. The album peaked at number 27 on the Billboard 200. On November 10, 2010, Johnny Franck announced his departure from the band to focus on his relationship with God.

=== 2011–2020: The March Ahead ===
In 2011, Franck formed a new group with Mike Caswell (K Será) called The March Ahead. The group worked on demos with producer Joey Sturgis, who also worked with Attack Attack!. They released their debut single, "I.R.T.S" on May 26, 2011. Their self-titled debut EP was released on August 16. In September 2013, the band performed at Liberty University, before Franck gave his testimony and fielded questions from the audience. In 2014, they released a cover of One Direction's "Story of My Life". In late 2014, the band premiered two new singles: "Creation" and "Statues". Throughout 2015 to 2020, the band released a handful of non-album singles.

=== 2016–present: Bilmuri ===
In 2016, Franck formed a solo project under the name, Bilmuri. The name is a play on the American actor Bill Murray. He released his debut studio album, Jaguar Shark under Bilmuri in January 2016. He later released the self-titled studio album on July 15. In 2017, Bilmuri released two albums, Frame and Banana. He released the album, Taco in August 2018. A cover of Owl City's "Fireflies" was released in September 2018. In November 2019, Franck collaborated with Shomo and released a parody version of their debut single with Attack Attack!, "Stick Stickly" titled, "Thicc Thiccly". The single was included on Bilmuri's album, Rich Sips, which was released on December 17. In April 2020, he released a collaborative album, Muri and Friends, where he had his friends sing the songs he produced for the album. In November 2020, Bilmuri released the album Eggy Pocket, which features appearances from Jon Mess (of Dance Gavin Dance) and Dayseeker. He was featured on the song "Into the Sunset" by Dance Gavin Dance on their album, Afterburner. In 2022, he released the album, Goblin Hours. He also embarked on the Goblin Hours tour in support of the album's release. Bilmuri joined Babymetal on the Fox Fest in May 2024. In June 2024, Franck signed with Columbia Records and released the album, American Motor Sports under the label. Bilmuri joined Sleep Token on a European tour in November 2024.

In June 2025, Bilmuri released a new song titled, "More Than Hate" and revealed a new album would follow. During that summer, he embarked on the Unstoppable Bilmuri Summer Slammer Tour. On March 13, 2026, he released another single, "Always Let You Down", featuring Jeremy McKinnon of A Day to Remember. The song peaked at number 45 on the US Hot Rock & Alternative Songs chart. It also reached number five on the US Hard Rock Digital Song Sales chart. On April 7, he released the single, "Where to Find Me" featuring Novelists. On April 10, he released his fifteenth album, Kinda Hard and embarked on a North American headlining tour in support of the album. The album debuted at number 108 on the Billboard 200.

=== 2016–present: Chayr ===
In 2016, he started an acoustic band with his friends. They released their debut studio album, Desk on March 28, 2018.

=== Solo career and collaborations ===
In June 2014, Franck released his debut single "There's Always Hope", as a solo artist. Franck has produced music for local bands like We Are The Blog, Boys of Fall, Insomniac and The Following, as well as with notable musicians such as Dave Days and Jarrod Alonge. He also collaborated with groups such as Dance Gavin Dance and Make Me Famous. He owns a recording studio, Johnny Franck Studios, where he has worked with over 70 bands.

== Musical styles and influences ==
Franck cited early influences from Enter Shikari and Forever the Sickest Kids. According to him, he loved how Enter Shikari combined dance music and hardcore breakdowns and wanted to incorporate that in Attack Attack!'s music. He also added some Christian themes to the band's music before his departure. Bilmuri has been described as post-hardcore and neon pop-punk, with hardcore and emo music influences. Bilmuri also incorporates lo-fi and indie-pop music.

== Personal life ==
He resides in Westerville, Ohio. Regarding his departure from Attack Attack! Franck cited his desire to focus on his Christian faith. He ran two Bible studies, one from his home and another at a high school. He has subsequently expressed skepticism regarding Christianity. Franck enjoys watching anime and cites it as inspiration for his music.

== Bilmuri live members ==
Current members

- Reese Maslen – guitar, backing vocals (2021–2025, 2026–present)
- Gabi Rose – saxophone, vocals, flute (2022–present)
- Aino Muruaishi – bass (2025, 2026–present)
- Joe Compton – pedal steel, banjo, acoustic guitar (2025–present)
- Zach Dubay – drums (2026–present)

Former members

- Noah Lanzador – drums (2018–2021)
- Paul Brennan – bass guitar, backing vocals (2018–2022)
- Catherine "OBLVYN" Bliemel – bass guitar, keyboards (2022)
- Jake Navarro – drums (2023)
- Xavier Ware – drums (2024–2025)
- Josh Manuel – drums (2021–2022, 2025)
- Nick Edwards – bass (2026)

== Discography ==
=== Attack Attack! ===
- Someday Came Suddenly (2008)
- Attack Attack! (2010)

=== The March Ahead ===
- The March Ahead (2011)
- Weight (2017)

=== Bilmuri ===
==== Studio albums ====
List of studio albums, with selected chart positions
| Title | Album details | Peak chart positions | | | |
| Title | Album details | US | SCO | UK Sales | UK Rock |
|---|---|---|---|---|---|
| Jaguar Shark | Released: January 3, 2016; Label: Bilmuri; Formats: Digital download, streaming | — | — | — | — |
| Bilmuri | Released: July 15, 2016; Label: Bilmuri; Formats: Digital download, streaming | — | — | — | — |
| Letter | Released: November 21, 2016; Label: Johnny Franck Productions; Formats: Digital download, streaming | — | — | — | — |
| Frame | Released: June 8, 2017; Label: Johnny Franck Productions; Formats: Digital download, streaming | — | — | — | — |
| Banana | Released: October 11, 2017; Label: Johnny Franck Productions; Formats: Digital download, streaming | — | — | — | — |
| Solid Chub | Released: March 16, 2018; Label: Johnny Franck Productions; Formats: CD, digital download, streaming | — | — | — | — |
| Taco | Released: August 30, 2018; Label: Johnny Franck Productions; Formats: CD, digital download, streaming | — | — | — | — |
| Wet Milk | Released: April 19, 2019; Label: Johnny Franck Productions; Formats: CD, digital download, streaming | — | — | — | — |
| Rich Sips | Released: December 17, 2019; Label: Johnny Franck Productions; Formats: CD, digital download, streaming | — | — | — | — |
| Muri and Friends | Released: April 7, 2020; Label: Johnny Franck Productions; Formats: CD, digital download, streaming | — | — | — | — |
| Eggy Pocket | Released: November 17, 2020; Label: Johnny Franck Productions; Formats: CD, digital download, streaming | — | — | — | — |
| 400lb Back Squat | Released: September 27, 2021; Label: Johnny Franck Productions; Formats: CD, digital download, streaming | — | — | — | — |
| Goblin Hours | Released: October 14, 2022; Label: Johnny Franck Productions; Formats: CD, digital download, streaming | — | — | — | — |
| American Motor Sports | Released: June 28, 2024; Label: Columbia; Formats: Digital download, LP, streaming | — | — | — | — |
| Kinda Hard | Released: April 10, 2026; Label: Columbia; Formats: Digital download, LP, CD, streaming | 108 | 71 | 50 | 10 |
"—" denotes a recording that did not chart or was not released in that territory.

==== Live albums ====
List of live albums with selected details
| Title | Details |
|---|---|
| Bilmuri Presents: The Hog Crankers Ball | Released: June 25, 2021; Label: Johnny Franck Productions; Formats: Digital download, streaming |

==== Singles ====
List of singles as lead artist, showing chart positions, year released and album name
| Title | Year | Peak chart positions | | | | Album |
| Title | Year | US Hard Rock | US Hot Rock | US Main. | US Rock Air. | Album |
|---|---|---|---|---|---|---|
| "There's Always Hope" | 2014 | — | — | — | — | Non-album singles |
| "Hold On, We're Going Home" (Drake cover) | 2016 | — | — | — | — | Non-album singles |
| "Army" | 2016 | — | — | — | — | Non-album singles |
| "You" | 2016 | — | — | — | — | Bilmuri |
| "Faint" | 2016 | — | — | — | — | Letters |
| "Scar" | 2017 | — | — | — | — | Frame |
| "Wave" | 2017 | — | — | — | — | Banana |
| "The Climb" (Miley Cyrus cover) | 2017 | — | — | — | — | Non-album single |
| "Gradient" | 2018 | — | — | — | — | Solid Chub |
| "Melancholy" | 2018 | — | — | — | — | Taco |
| "Stay" (Post Malone cover) | 2018 | — | — | — | — | Non-album singles |
| "Fireflies" (Owl City cover) | 2018 | — | — | — | — | Non-album singles |
| "Lifeisgood" | 2019 | — | — | — | — | Wet Milk |
| "Thicc Thiccly" (featuring Caleb Shomo) | 2019 | — | — | — | — | Rich Sips |
| "ABSOLUTELYCRANKINMYMF'INHOG" (featuring Brody) | 2020 | — | — | — | — | Eggy Pocket |
| "LORDFARQUADZILLA" (featuring Jonathan Young) | 2021 | — | — | — | — | 400lb Back Squat |
| "The Void Approacheth" (featuring Summer Hoop) | 2022 | — | — | — | — | Goblin Hours |
| "Corn-Fed Yetis" | 2022 | — | — | — | — | Goblin Hours |
| "Anabolic Spudsman (Thique Edition)" (featuring Spencer Stewart & Will Ramos) | 2022 | — | — | — | — | Non-album singles |
| "Boutta Cashew" | 2023 | — | — | — | — | Non-album singles |
| "Livin' Laughin' Lovin'" | 2023 | — | — | — | — | Non-album singles |
| "Better Hell" | 2024 | — | — | — | — | American Motor Sports |
| "Blindsided" | 2024 | — | — | — | — | American Motor Sports |
| "2016 Cavaliers (Ohio)" (featuring Knox) | 2024 | — | — | — | — | American Motor Sports |
| "More Than Hate" | 2025 | 14 | — | 25 | — | Kinda Hard |
| "Hard 2 Tell" | 2025 | 21 | — | — | — | Kinda Hard |
| "I Really Want to Stay at Your House" (Rosa Walton and Hallie Coggins cover) | 2025 | — | — | — | — | Spotify Singles |
| "Twice" | 2026 | 21 | — | — | — | Kinda Hard |
| "Always Let You Down" (with A Day to Remember) | 2026 | 3 | 45 | 6 | 20 | Kinda Hard |
| "Where To Find Me" (with Novelists) | 2026 | 20 | — | — | — | Kinda Hard |
"—" denotes releases that did not chart.

=== Other charted songs ===
| Title | Year | Peak chart positions | Album |
| Title | Year | US Hard Rock | Album |
|---|---|---|---|
| "Kinda Hard" | 2026 | 19 | Kinda Hard |
| "Worst Part of You" | 2026 | 17 | Kinda Hard |
| "Rock Bottom" | 2026 | 12 | Kinda Hard |
| "Shyt Fyst" | 2026 | 24 | Kinda Hard |
| "Back, Then" | 2026 | 25 | Kinda Hard |

=== Guest appearances ===
| Year | Title | Artist(s) | Album | Ref. |
|---|---|---|---|---|
| 2011 | "Control Freak" | Sirena | For Those Who Dare to Dream | |
| 2011 | "(L)egolord" | Another Hero Dies | Arguments | |
| 2012 | "I Am a Traitor" | Make Me Famous | It's Now or Never | |
| 2013 | "Never Break Character!" | She Screams of Royalty | Non-album single | |
| 2013 | "Spectre" | The Wise Man's Fear | Ascend from Darkness (EP) | |
| 2015 | "I'm So Scene 2.0" | Jarrod Alonge | Beating a Dead Horse | |
| 2016 | "Trigger Warning" | Sunrise Skater Kids | Friendville | |
| 2016 | "Sugar Pill" (The Japanese House cover) | Nathan Kane | Non-album single | |
| 2020 | "Into the Sunset" | Dance Gavin Dance | Afterburner | |
| 2020 | "Forgetting Yourself" | A Legacy Left | Keep Your Enemies Close | |
| 2021 | "Careless Whisper" | Jonathan Young | Young's Old Covers | |

== Production discography ==
| Year | Artist(s) | Album | Notes | Ref. |
|---|---|---|---|---|
| 2011 | The March Ahead | The March Ahead (EP) | Producer, writer | |
| 2011 | Another Hero Dies | Arguments | Producer, engineer | |
| 2012 | Seraphim | The Passage (EP) | Producer | |
| 2012 | The March Ahead | B-Sides (EP) | Producer, mixing, mastering, writer | |
| 2012 | SycAmour | Obscure (EP) | Writer | |
| 2013 | Seraphim | Roots & Ruins (EP) | Producer, recording | |
| 2013 | Mailman | Elder (EP) | Producer | |
| 2013 | Cinsera | Coryphée (EP) | Producer, engineer, recording, mixing and mastering | |
| 2014 | Allistair | Just a Little Bit | Co-producer | |
| 2014 | Send Request | Beyond the Ordinary (EP) | Co-producer | |
| 2014 | Johnny Franck | "There's Always Hope" | Producer, mixing, mastering, writer | |
| 2014 | The March Ahead | "Story of My Life" (One Direction cover) | Producer, mixing, mastering, arranging | |
| 2014 | Villain of the Story | "Pop" ('N Sync cover) | Producer, mixing, mastering, arranging | |
| 2014 | Empty My Lungs | "Hourglass" | Producer, mixing and mastering | |
| 2014 | Boys of Fall | "First Rate Pyro" | Mastering | |
| 2014 | A Life All My Own | Better Angels (EP) | Co-producer, writer | |
| 2014 | Wayfarer | "Nightcaller" | Producer, mixing and mastering | |
| 2014 | Seraphim | "Burn" (Ellie Goulding cover) | Producer, mixing, mastering, arranging | |
| 2014 | SycAmour | Indulgence: A Saga of Lights | Producer, engineer | |
| 2014 | Boys of Fall | "Amnesia" (5 Seconds of Summer cover) | Producer, mixing and mastering | |
| 2014 | Boys of Fall | "My Promise to Maryland" | Producer, mixing and mastering | |
| 2014 | The March Ahead | "Creation / Statues" | Producer, recording, mixing, mastering, writer, lyrics | |
| 2015 | Empty My Lungs | "Braver" | Producer, mixing and mastering | |
| 2015 | The March Ahead | "We Are All Going to Die / This Is Not the End (Piano version)" | Producer, mixing and mastering | |
| 2015 | Johnny Franck | "Till the End" | Producer, mixing, mastering, writer | |
| 2015 | Villain of the Story | The Prologue (EP) | Producer, mixing, mastering, writer (additional) | |
| 2015 | Seraphim | "Abyss" | Producer, mixing and mastering | |
| 2015 | The Knowing Within | Believe to See (EP) | Producer, recording, co-writer | |
| 2015 | Empty My Lungs | "Unbroken" | Producer, mixing and mastering | |
| 2015 | Various | Beating a Dead Horse | Producer, engineer, mixing, writer (tracks 1–4, 6–11, 13–15) | |
| 2015 | Arbor Reign | Changes (EP) | Producer, mixing and mastering | |
| 2015 | Send Request | Make Your Move (EP) | Producer, mixing and mastering | |
| 2015 | Boys of Fall | "Pass Me By" | Producer, recording, mixing and mastering | |
| 2015 | The Wise Man's Fear | Castle in the Clouds | Producer, mixing and mastering | |
| 2015 | The March Ahead | "I Can’t Make U Love Me" (Bonnie Raitt cover) | Producer | |
| 2015 | The March Ahead | "Where Are Ü Now" (Skrillex, Justin Bieber & Diplo cover) | Producer, mixing and mastering | |
| 2015 | The March Ahead | "Youth" (Daughter cover) | Producer, mixing and mastering | |
| 2016 | Bilmuri | Jaguar Shark | Vocals, guitar, producer, recording, pmixing, mastering, writer | |
| 2016 | Villain of the Story | "Break the Chains" | Producer (additional), tracking | |
| 2016 | Seraphim | Tabula Rasa (EP) | Producer | |
| 2016 | Boys of Fall | Thank You & Goodbye | Producer (additional), engineer, mixing and mastering (tracks 12 and 13) | |
| 2016 | Sunrise Skater Kids | Friendville | Producer, engineer, mixing | |
| 2016 | Johnny Franck | "Hold On, We're Going Home" (Drake cover) | Vocals, guitar | |
| 2016 | Amidst the Grave's Demons | Space Zombies EP | Producer, engineer, mixing | |
| 2016 | The 4 of Us Are Dying | The 4 of Us Are Dying (EP) | Producer | |
| 2016 | Chayr | Lamp (EP) | Producer, mixing, mastering, writer | |
| 2016 | Bilmuri | Bilmuri | Vocals, instrumentation, producer, mixing, mastering, writer | |
| 2016 | Organ Salad | Rot, Sick & Thin (EP) | Producer, mixing and mastering | |
| 2016 | Jared Dines | The Dark (EP) | Mixing and mastering | |
| 2016 | $wagCh0de | "Pubic Apology" | Producer, co-writer | |
| 2016 | SycAmour | "Turns You On (Siberian)" | Producer | |
| 2016 | Chayr | "Real" | Producer, mixing, mastering, writer | |
| 2016 | The March Ahead | "Time After Time" (Cyndi Lauper cover) | Producer | |
| 2016 | Jared Dines | The Light (EP) | Producer, mixing and mastering | |
| 2016 | Bilmuri | Letters | Vocals, instrumentation, producer, mixing, mastering, writer | |
| 2016 | The March Ahead | "Let Me Love You" (Justin Bieber cover) | Producer, mixing, mastering, writer | |
| 2017 | Villain of the Story | Wrapped in Vines, Covered in Thorns | Producer, mixing and mastering | |
| 2017 | The March Ahead | Weight (EP) | Vocals, guitar, producer, mixing, mastering, co-writer | |
| 2017 | CrazyEightyEight | Covers, Vol. 1 (EP) | Producer, mixing and mastering | |
| 2017 | Chayr | Couch (EP) | Producer, mixing and mastering | |
| 2017 | CrazyEightyEight | No Words Spoken (EP) | Producer, mixing and mastering | |
| 2017 | Bilmuri | Frame | Instrumentation, vocals, producer, mixing, mastering, writer | |
| 2017 | The March Ahead | "2U" (David Guetta (Ft. Justin Bieber) cover) | Vocals, guitar, producer, mixing, mastering, writer | |
| 2017 | VANISH | From Sheep to Wolves (EP) | Producer, mixing and mastering | |
| 2017 | Canadian Softball | Awkward & Depressed | Producer, engineer, mixing, mastering, writer | |
| 2017 | The Wise Man's Fear | The Lost City | Producer, mixing and mastering | |
| 2017 | Jared Dines | "The "Brotherhood" Series 6" | | |
| 2017 | The March Ahead | "Make Me Believe" | Vocals, guitar, producer, writer | |
| 2017 | Bilmuri | Banana | Vocals, instrumentation, producer, mixing, mastering, writer | |
| 2017 | CrazyEightyEight | Covers, Vol. 2 (EP) | Producer, mixing and mastering | |
| 2017 | Bilmuri | "The Climb" (Miley Cyrus cover) | Producer, mixing, mastering, writer | |
| 2018 | Bilmuri | Solid Chub | Producer, mixing, mastering, writer | |
| 2018 | Chayr | Desk | Producer, writer | |
| 2018 | Settle Your Scores | Better Luck Tomorrow | Producer, engineer, mixing | |
| 2018 | For the Likes of You | "Habitual Gloom" | Producer, mixing, mastering | |
| 2018 | Chayr | "The Weekend" | Producer | |
| 2018 | Bilmuri | "Stay" (Post Malone cover) | Producer, mixing, mastering, writer | |
| 2018 | SycAmour | Substance Abuse | Producer | |
| 2018 | Send Request | Perspectives | Producer, engineer, mixing | |
| 2018 | Bilmuri | Taco | Instrumentation, producer, mixing, mastering, writer | |
| 2018 | Villain of the Story | Ashes | Producer, mixing and mastering | |
| 2018 | Daddy Rock | Daddy Rock | Mixing and mastering | |
| 2018 | Bilmuri | "Fireflies" (Owl City cover) | Producer, mixing, mastering, writer | |
| 2018 | The March Ahead | "Calloused" | Vocals, guitars, producer, writer | |
| 2018 | CrazyEightyEight | Burning Alive | Producer, engineer (tracks 1–5, 7–14), mixing (tracks 10 and 13), co-writer (tracks 4, 8, 9, 11–13) | |
| 2019 | Bilmuri & No Dice | DiceMuri (Split) | Producer (tracks 2 and 4), mixing, mastering, writer (tracks 2 and 4) | |
| 2019 | Chayr | "Slow Burn" | Producer | |
| 2019 | VANISH | Familiar Faces | Producer, recording | |
| 2019 | The March Ahead | "With Me" | Vocals, guitar, producer, co-writer | |
| 2019 | Bilmuri | Wet Milk | Producer, mixing, mastering, writer | |
| 2019 | Lauren Babic | Covers, Vol. 1 | Producer (tracks 2 and 4) | |
| 2019 | Jonathan Young | Villains | Mixing and mastering (tracks 1–7, 9, 10, 12, 13, 15–17, 21 and 22) | |
| 2019 | Bilmuri | Pasteurized Milk (EP) | Producer, writer, lyrics | |
| 2019 | Bilmuri | Rich Sips | Co-producer, co-mixing, co-writer, lyrics | |
| 2020 | No Dice | "Chloe" | Producer | |
| 2020 | The March Ahead | "RELIEF" | Vocals, guitar, producer, co-writer | |
| 2020 | Bilmuri | Muri and Friends (EP) | Vocals, guitar, producer, mixing, mastering, writer | |
| 2020 | The March Ahead | "SPLIT" (feat. Jake Impellizzeri) | Vocals, guitar, producer, co-writer | |
| 2020 | The Wise Man's Fear | Valley of Kings | Producer | |
| 2020 | The March Ahead | "WITHYOU" | Vocals, guitar, producer, co-writer | |
| 2020 | No Dice | About People, for People (EP) | Producer | |
| 2020 | Vermillion Heights | Lost & Found | Recording engineer | |
| 2020 | Bilmuri | Eggy Pocket | Drums, producer, engineer, mixing, mastering, co-writer | |
| 2021 | Chayr | The Sonder (EP) | Producer, co-writer | |
| 2021 | No Dice | "Peter Riffin" | Producer | |
| 2021 | Bilmuri | Bilmuri Presents: The Hog Crankers Ball (Live) | Vocals, guitar, producer | |
| 2021 | Bilmuri | 400Lb Back Squat | Vocals, producer, writer, lyrics | |
| 2022 | Lauren Babic | "Bad Romance" (Lady Gaga cover) | Co-producer | |
| 2022 | Bilmuri | Goblin Hours | Co-producer, co-writer | |
| 2022 | Bilmuri | "ANABOLIC SPUDSMAN (THIQUE EDITION)" (feat. Will Ramos & Spencer Stewart (The Band Camino)) | Co-producer, co-writer | |
| 2022 | Seraphim | "Singularity" | Writer | |
| 2023 | Crimson Adored | "The Pain That Remains" | Writer | |
| 2023 | Crimson Adored | "Never Be Defeated" | Writer | |
| 2024 | Bilmuri | American Motor Sports | Guitar, co-producer, co-writer | |
