= Steve Terreberry =

Canadian YouTuber & musician (born 1987)

- Born: Steven Roger Terreberry; September 30, 1987 (age 39)
- Other name: Stevie T
- Occupations: YouTuber; musician; comedian; guitarist

YouTube information
- Channels: Steve Terreberry; Unka Munka
- Years active: 2008–present
- Genres: Music; comedy
- Subscribers: 4.4 million
- Views: 824 million
- Musical career
- Genres: Djent; rock; heavy metal
- Instruments: Guitar; vocals; drums; bass; triangle
- Label: Artery Recordings
- Last updated: September 19, 2025

Steven Roger Terreberry (/ˈtɛribɛri/, born September 30, 1987), also known as Stevie T, is a Canadian YouTuber and musician and comedian based in Welland, Ontario. He is known for his comedic videos involving music and for being a notable player of the djent subgenre.

== Career ==
Terreberry created his YouTube channel on January 7, 2008. His first video was a guitar cover of "When the Saints Go Marching In". He began to gain popularity on the site in 2011, with the first major video being "How To Play Guitar Like Lil Wayne".

In 2014, Terreberry signed on with music label Artery Recordings. Terreberry's debut album, Album of Epicness, was released in 2015 with the lead single "Djenstrumental". He also contributed the guitar solo on the song "Love Me Back" by the fictional band Sunrise Skater Kids, off of Jarrod Alonge's 2015 project Beating a Dead Horse.

In 2019, Terreberry started a competition with Jared Dines to play the guitar with the most strings. The competition ended after Terreberry received a custom 20-string guitar, made by 10s Guitars. Terreberry and Dines later sold their instruments for charity.

Also in 2019, Terreberry was invited to tour with DragonForce as a replacement for bassist Frédéric Leclercq. Initially agreeing to the tour, Terreberry swiftly dropped out due to anxiety attacks. Afterwards, he was given a cameo appearance in the music video for the song "Razorblade Meltdown".

On May 7, 2021, Terreberry's YouTube channel was hacked, resulting in most of his videos being set to private, as well as his channel's name and photo being changed. The hacker was identified as a Binance employee impersonator. During the hack, a livestream involving Binance was public on his channel until it was terminated shortly after a mass report. When Terreberry's channel was recovered, the livestream was removed, and his channel's name and photo were reset. Three days later, all of his videos were reset to public.

On March 30, 2022, Terreberry played a guitar solo on stage with DragonForce during the band's live show in Toronto.

On September 27, 2025, Terreberry launched a new YouTube channel, "Unka Munka". The channel uploads children's songs written and performed by Terreberry, in the musical style of rock and pop-punk. The first song named "Animal Sounds Are Fun" was uploaded the same day.

== Discography ==
=== Albums ===
Title	Album details	Ref.
Album of Epicness	Released: April 28, 2015; Label: Artery; Format: Digital download, streaming	

=== Non-album singles ===
List adapted from TIDAL on December 16, 2022.

- "Metalcore Song" 2013
- "Online Lover" 2014
- "Super Mario Bros. Djent" 2014
- "Man Bun Song" 2016
- "Halloween Core" 2016
- "Negative Comments Song" 2016
- "Shredding National Anthems" 2017
- "Yu-Gi-Oh! Guitar Battle" 2017
- "Uku-Djent" 2017
- "Another Brick in the Wall, Pt. 2 (In Major)" 2017
- "Fidget Spinner Metal" 2017
- "Breakdown" (Tom Petty and the Heartbreakers cover) 2017
- "Life in Virtual" 2018
- "Canada Bumps" 2018
- "Jurassic Park Guitar Cover" 2018
- "Acoustipop" 2020
- "Jojo" ("In Managua" cover) 2020
- "Punk Rock God" 2020
- "Song Using ALL of My Guitars" 2020
- "Somebody's Watching Me METAL" (featuring Anthony Vincent) 2021
- "Cowboy Boots & Beers" 2022
- "Rebounding" (featuring Anthony Vincent) 2022
- "Subliminal Tie" (featuring Tokyo Speirs) 2022
- "Stand Up" (Papa Roach cover) (featuring Anthony Vincent and Joey Izzo) 2022
- "Knipslot" 2022
- "Mr. Bridghtside" – In the style of Avenged Sevenfold (The Killers cover) (featuring Anthony Vincent) 2024
- "Isugaku Never Say Goodbye" (featuring ZP Theart) 2026

=== Other appearances ===
Title	Year	Credited artist(s)	Album	Ref.
"Amorous"	2012	Manuel Baccano (featuring Stevie T.)	—	
"We Love Music"	2015	LMF Project (featuring Stevie T.)	—	
"Love Me Back"	2015	Jarrod Alonge (featuring Cody Carson)	Beating a Dead Horse	(Note: "Love Me Back" is also on the Sunrise Skater Kids album Friendville.)
"Dread Machine"	2018	Dread Machine	—	
"Immobilized"	2018	Dread Machine	—	
"Lonely"	2020	Walk off the Earth	—	
"Mczilio DinesBerry"	2020	Jared Dines (featuring McRocklin, Alessandro Zilio, and Stevie T)	Shred Feast	

== Personal life ==
Terreberry resides in Ontario, Canada, where he was also born and raised. He was given the middle name "Roger" in tribute to his uncle, who died at 17 from muscular dystrophy before Terreberry was born.

Terreberry's grandfather, Leo Daudelin (1934–2022), was the accordion player for the band Sundown Jim and the Willoughby Ramblers. After Daudelin's death, his accordion was passed down to Terreberry, who used it to cover one of his band's songs as a tribute.

Terreberry has been open about his struggles with his mental health, particularly with anxiety and has admitted to being prescribed anti-depressants.

Terreberry often says his favourite guitar riff is from Eric Clapton's hit song, "Layla"; and that his favourite solo is from "Comfortably Numb" by Pink Floyd. His other influences include Metallica, Nuno Bettencourt, Pantera (particularly Dimebag Darrell), and AC/DC (particularly Angus Young).

Terreberry has owned a number of different guitars, with many coming from Kiesel Guitars. One of his Kiesel guitars was designed in tribute to his late producer Carmen Sorge, and was stylized after a Gibson Les Paul used by Alex Lifeson. He also owns a Solar guitar that was gifted by Ola Englund.
