= Beating a Dead Horse (album) =

Studio album by Jarrod Alonge
- Released: May 26, 2015; December 4, 2015 (reissue)
- Genres: Parody, comedy rock, comedy punk Amidst the Grave's Demons: metalcore, post-hardcore Sunrise Skater Kids: pop punk Chewed Up: melodic hardcore, hardcore punk Vermicide Violence: deathcore Canadian Softball: emo, math rock, indie rock Rectangles: progressive metalcore, djent $wagCh0de: crunkcore
- Length: 54:32
- Label: Independent
- Producers: Johnny Franck; Joey Sturgis; Drewsif Stalin; Luke Oxendale

Jarrod Alonge chronology
| Beating a Dead Horse (2015) | Friendville (2016) |

Deluxe Reissue Cover
- "BADH: Deluxe Ultra-Limited Exclusive Undead Edition"

Singles from Beating a Dead Horse
- 1. "The Swimmer" Released: 27 May 2015; 2. "Save My Life" Released: 11 August 2015; 3. "Inconceivable Somatic Defecation" Released: 26 August 2015; 4. "Unbreakable" Released: 25 September 2015; 5. "First World Tragedy" Released: 27 November 2015

Beating a Dead Horse is the debut studio album by YouTube comedian Jarrod Alonge, self-released on May 26, 2015. The album features seven different fictitious bands created by Alonge to satirize the tropes and characteristics of alternative music genres such as metalcore, post-hardcore, pop punk, emo, progressive metal, hardcore punk and others.

The album was a critical and commercial success, reaching number 1 on the Billboard Top Comedy Albums chart and number 18 on the Top Heatseekers chart. On October 30, Alonge announced a deluxe reissue of the album featuring six additional songs, which was released on December 4, 2015.

== Background ==
Alonge announced plans to record the album on September 26, 2014, and launched an Indiegogo campaign with an initial goal of raising $12,000. He released several promotional videos throughout October, including mock interviews with the fictitious bands that would be featured on the album. His goal was reached by January 2015, ultimately raising over $18,000, allowing for more songs to be recorded than he had initially anticipated.

On April 5, 2015, Alonge released an official trailer for the album, revealing a 15-song track list, and several samples of the album's songs. The following month, the list of guest vocalists that would be featured on the album was announced, including Mattie Montgomery of For Today, Johnny Franck, formerly of Attack Attack! (who also would produce the album), and Mike Semesky, formerly of Intervals. Alonge also announced that the album would be mastered by Joey Sturgis, a well-known metalcore producer that had worked with many bands, such as Asking Alexandria, The Devil Wears Prada, I See Stars, and Of Mice & Men.

The first track to be revealed off of the album, "Hey Jarrod, What's That Song Again?" was released on May 12, 2015, with an accompanying lyric video. Five more of the album's songs were released in the following weeks with lyric videos, before the album was officially released on May 26.

Alonge continued to promote the album after its release, releasing a music video for the album's first single, "The Swimmer" on May 27, 2015. Another promotional video was released for "Save My Life" on August 11. A third video for "Inconceivable Somatic Defecation" was released on August 26. The following month, on September 25, a music video for "Unbreakable" was released.

On October 30, Jarrod announced on his YouTube channel he would be releasing a deluxe edition of the album, titled "Beating a Dead Horse: Deluxe Ultra-Limited Exclusive Undead Edition", featuring six new songs and new album artwork. The reissue would include parodies of Bring Me the Horizon, Attila, and The Story So Far. All of the fictitious bands (with the exception of Chewed Up) would be featured on the reissue. It was set for release on December 4, 2015.

The first track on the deluxe reissue, "Suck my 401k", was released on November 6, with an accompanying lyric video. On November 18, "Brevé Canzoné" was released. On November 27, "First World Tragedy" was released with a music video. The remainder of the bonus tracks were released throughout the next week before the deluxe edition was officially released on December 4.

== Bands ==
=== Amidst the Grave's Demons ===
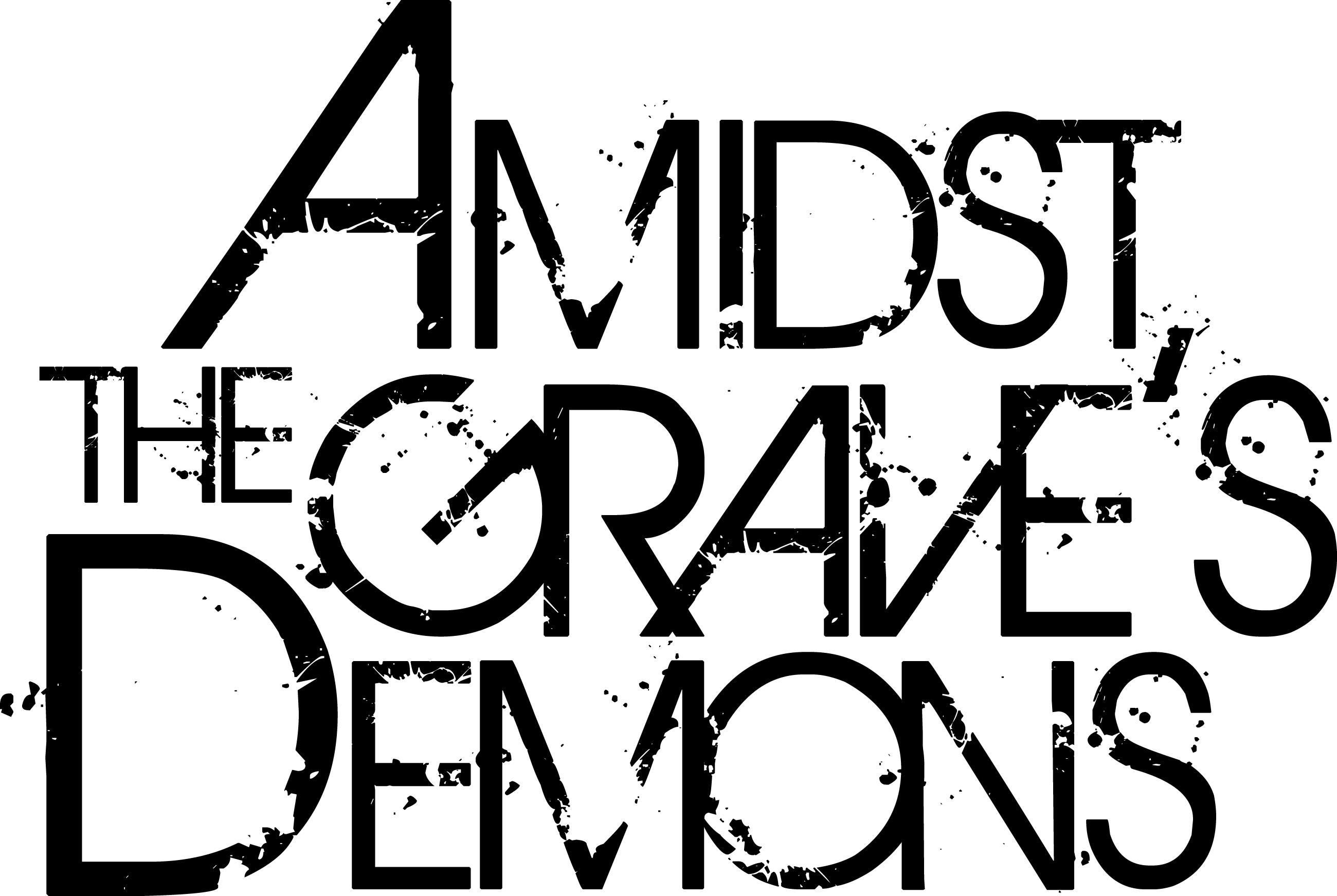
Amidst The Grave's Demons logo

Amidst the Grave's Demons is a fictitious metalcore band from Columbus, Ohio, parodying bands such as Memphis May Fire, We Came as Romans, The Color Morale, and Of Mice & Men, among many others. The band performs five of the album's tracks: "The Swimmer", "Save My Life", "Misogyneric", "I'm So Scene 2.0", and "Hey Jarrod, What's That Song Again?", in addition to one track on the album's deluxe reissue, "Suck my 401k".

The majority of the vocals for the band were performed by Mike Martenson of the band Boys of Fall. He screams on all of Amidst the Grave's Demons' songs, and sings on all of them aside from "Misogyneric". Chris Linck of Attila performs a guitar solo on "Suck My 401k".

Johnny Franck (formerly of Attack Attack!) performs clean vocals on "I'm So Scene 2.0", and Mattie Montgomery of For Today performs some vocals on "Misogyneric".

Amidst the Grave's Demons was the first band to be created by Jarrod Alonge, and one of the two bands to release original music before the album's conception (the other being Sunrise Skater Kids). The band was first conceived in July 2013 in Jarrod Alonge's "Every Metalcore Vocalist" video, before releasing two songs in late 2013 and 2014: a demo version of "I'm So Scene" and a 10-hour instrumental breakdown loop titled "Eternity (Literally)". "I'm So Scene" featured unclean vocals by YouTuber Sky Sevart, and was composed by Alonge and his friends Benjamin Fleet and Blake Feagans, who used to play in a band called Ukulele and the Sock Monkeys. Alonge produced both tracks.

On June 1, 2016, Alonge announced that Amidst the Grave's Demons would be releasing a five-song EP later in the month, featuring four band-specific parodies and an acoustic version of a track from Beating a Dead Horse. On June 6, the EP's title, Space Zombies EP was revealed, as well as an official track listing. The album title is a parody of The Devil Wears Prada's Zombie EP and Space EP. Space Zombies EP was released on June 17. Physical copies of the EP contain the six songs featured on Beating a Dead Horse.

=== Sunrise Skater Kids ===
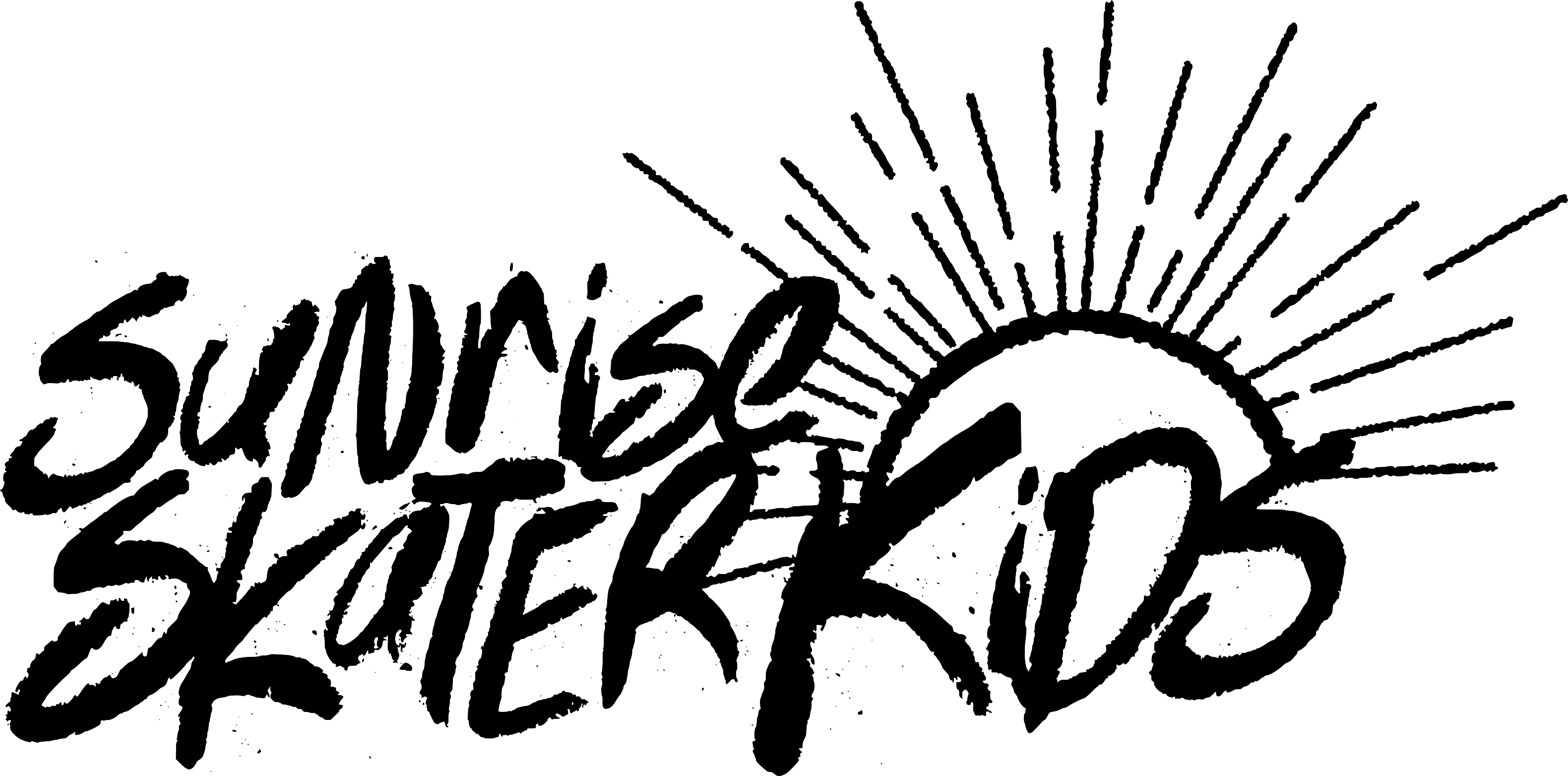
Sunrise Skater Kids logo

Sunrise Skater Kids from Baltimore, Maryland was the second fictitious band created by Alonge, and performs the pop punk songs on the album, parodying bands such as All Time Low, Neck Deep, and Chunk! No, Captain Chunk!. The band performs four of the album's songs: "Love Me Back", "Take it Easycore", "Pop Punk Pizza Party", and "Goodbye Baltimore". They performed one song on the album's deluxe reissue, "First World Tragedy".

The vocals for the band were primarily performed by Varrick Jay of the band Insomniac, although the unclean vocals in "Take it Easycore" were performed by Mike Martenson. "Love Me Back" features guest vocals by Cody Carson of the band Set It Off, as well as a guitar solo by YouTube comedian and musician Stevie T. Lastly, "Pop Punk Pizza Party" features vocals by YouTube musician Dave Days.

The band was created in August 2013 and was referenced in Alonge's "Every Pop Punk Vocalist" video. Sunrise Skater Kids released one song shortly prior to the album's conception: a demo version of "Pop Punk Pizza Party" featuring vocals by Patty Walters of the band As It Is.

On November 26, 2015, Sunrise Skater Kids released a rendition of The Twelve Days of Christmas, titled "12 Days of a Pop Punk Christmas". The song was released on the deluxe reissue of Fearless Records' compilation album Punk Goes Christmas. This is the second song recorded by Alonge that was not featured on Beating a Dead Horse.

Another song, a pop punk-themed medley titled "All the Old Things" was released on January 29, 2016. The same day, an Indiegogo campaign was created for a Sunrise Skater Kids independent album. The initial goal was $10,000 for an EP, and the stretch goal for a full album was $20,000.

On April 1, 2016, Alonge released the full-length Sunrise Skater Kids album, titled Friendville. The album features collaborations with JB Brubaker of August Burns Red, Dave Stephens of We Came as Romans, and Patty Walters of As It Is. The five Sunrise Skater Kids tracks from Beating a Dead Horse are featured as bonus content on the album.

=== Chewed Up ===
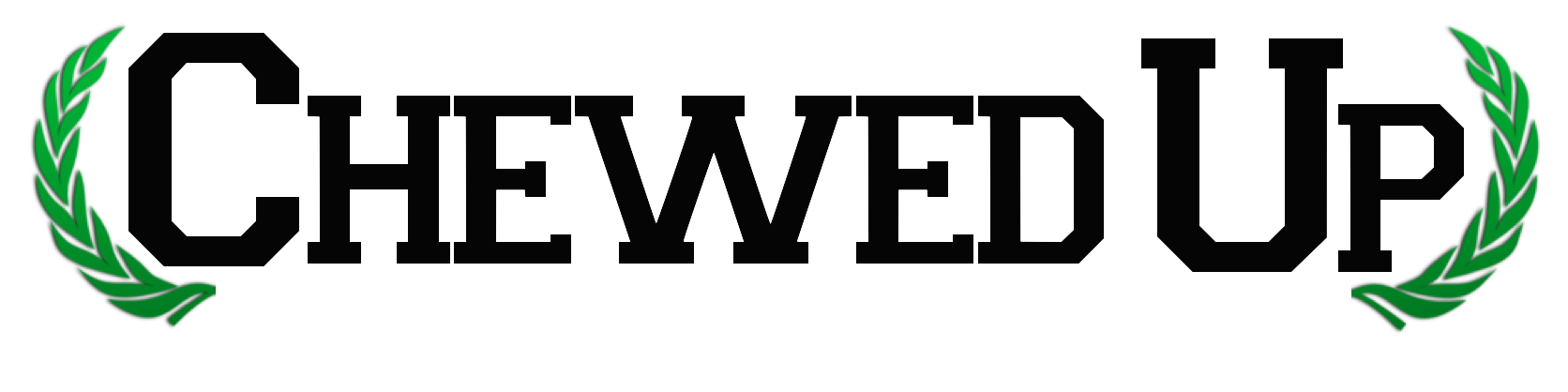
Chewed Up logo

Chewed Up (from Boston, Massachusetts) is the third fictitious band to be featured on the album, and represents the melodic hardcore and hardcore punk genres, like bands such as The Ghost Inside, Counterparts, Gideon, and Stick To Your Guns. The band has two songs featured on the album: "Unbreakable" and "Bite the Curb". The band is not featured on the album's deluxe reissue.

David Thompson of the band Nanashi performed the vocals on both of Chewed Up's tracks. Sam Fassler performed additional vocals on "Unbreakable".

Although Chewed Up didn't release any original music prior to the album, they were created and referenced in Alonge's "Every Hardcore Vocalist" video in late 2013.

=== Vermicide Violence ===
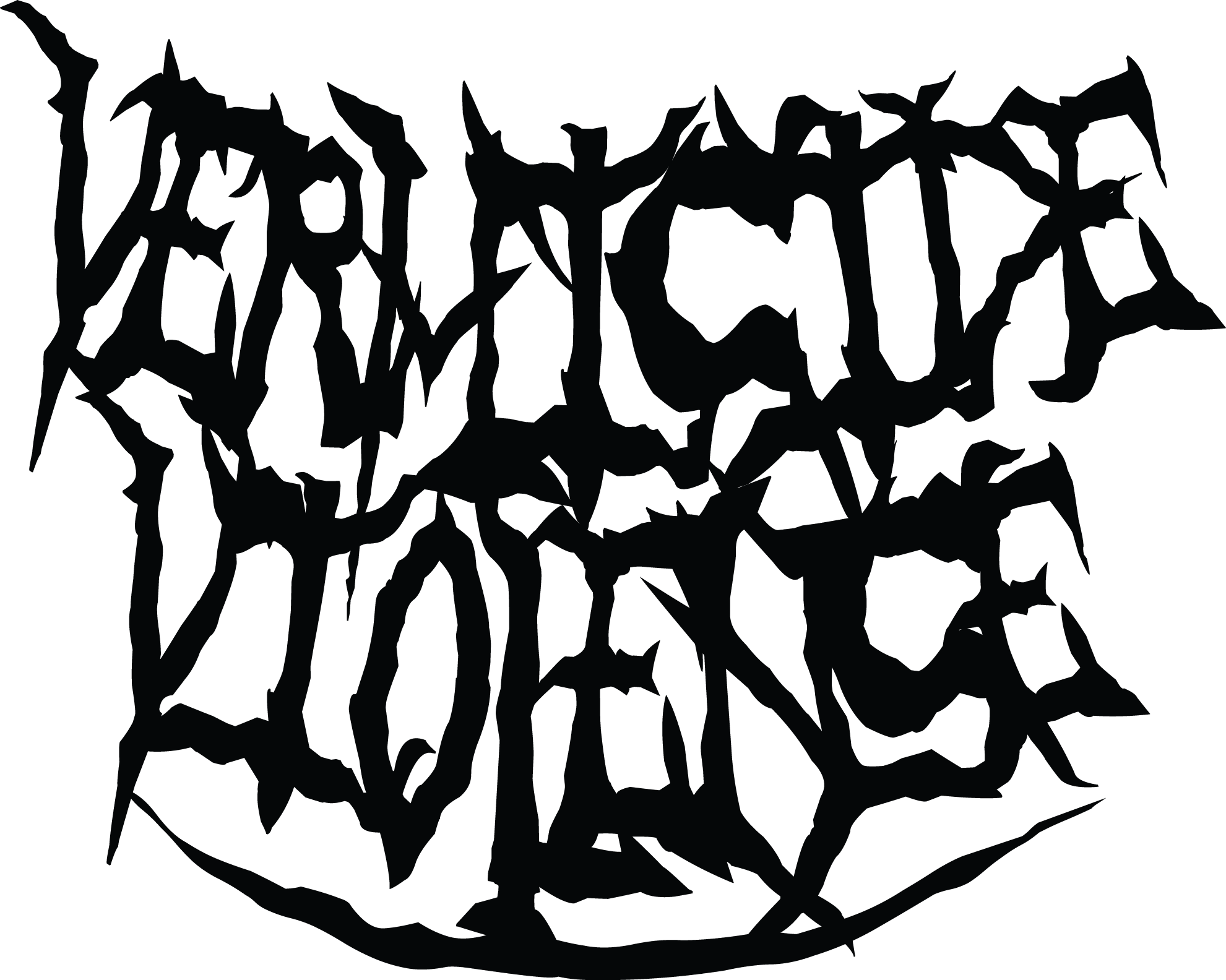
Vermicide Violence logo

Vermicide Violence is a fictitious deathcore band from Los Angeles, California. The band's name is a play on the deathcore band Suicide Silence.

According to the band's Rock Sound Artist Profile, Vermicide Violence is composed of vocalist Jarrod Alonge and guitarist Brenden Worthington (the band's other members were not named). According to Worthington, Alonge replaced the band's original vocalist, who is hinted at being deceased (in reference to the late Mitch Lucker), but had actually been kicked out of the band for failure to be on time for band practice. The band claimed to have toured with other deathcore bands such as Infant Annihilator, Winds of Plague, Chelsea Grin, and Emmure.

The band only has one song featured on the album: "Inconceivable Somatic Defecation", referencing Whitechapel's debut album The Somatic Defilement. The vocals on the song were performed by YouTube comedian and musician Jared Dines, then vocalist for Dissimulator.

An additional song, called "Pray for Progress" was released on the album's deluxe reissue. The song marks a drastic stylistic change from "Inconceivable Somatic Defecation", taking influences from post-hardcore, metalcore, and alternative rock rather than deathcore; this is a parody of the dramatic genre change Bring Me the Horizon underwent after their debut album. The name is also a play on "Pray for Plagues", the first track on Bring Me the Horizon's debut full-length album Count Your Blessings. Dines did not provide vocals on "Pray for Progress;" clean vocals were performed by Johnny Franck and unclean vocals were performed by Mike Martenson.

=== Canadian Softball ===
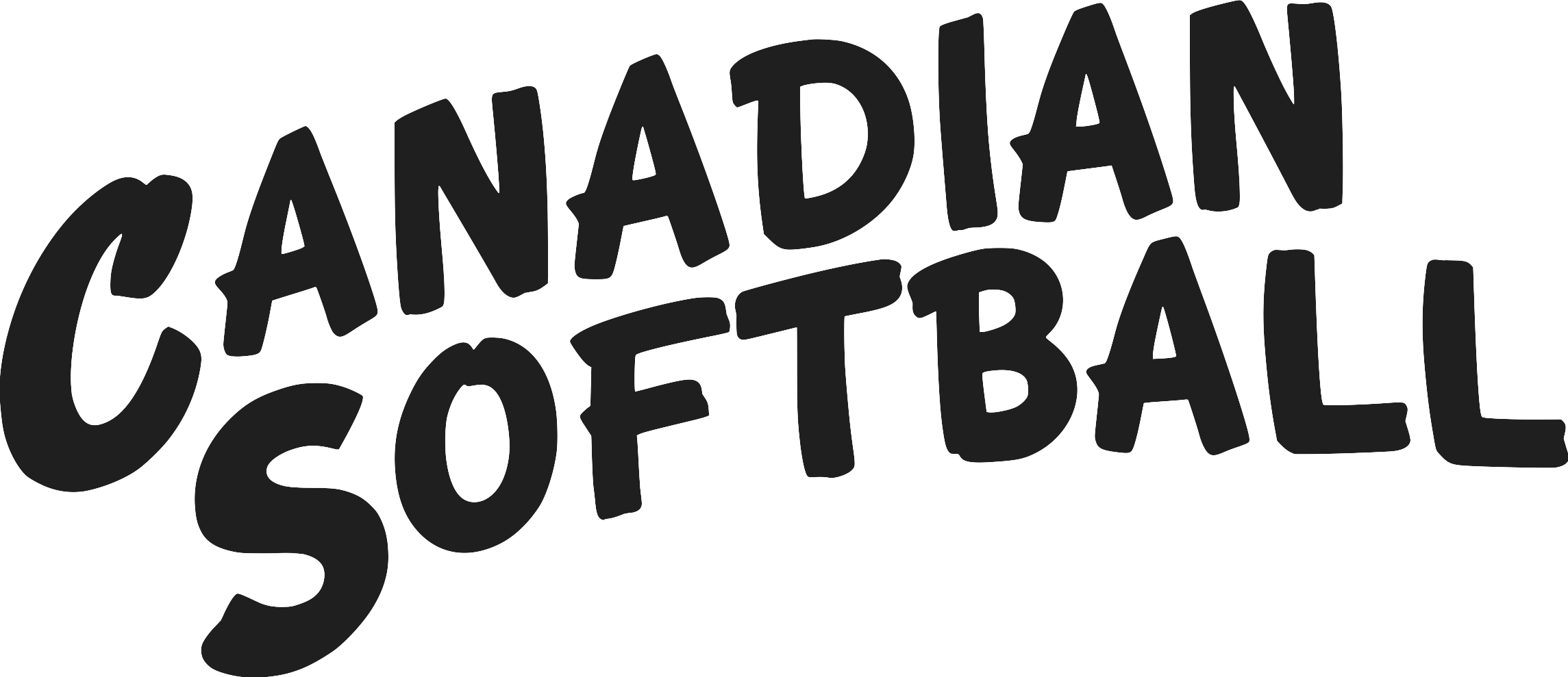
Canadian Softball logo

Canadian Softball is a fictitious emo band from Milwaukee, Wisconsin. The band's style parodies the wave of Midwestern emo bands that came around in the late 1990s and early 2000s, such as American Football. Alonge stated that the band's name came from an amalgamation of American Football and Modern Baseball.

According to the band's Rock Sound Artist Profile, the band is composed of vocalist and guitarist Jarrod Alonge, bassist Will Greene, and drummer/backing vocalist Andy Conway. The band's genre was referred to as "indie math rock", and was formed in 2004. The band's influences include Sunny Day Real Estate, Mineral, The Promise Ring, American Football, Pedro the Lion, The Get Up Kids, Jimmy Eat World, and Braid.

The band had one song on the album: "The Distance Between You and Me is Longer Than the Title of this Song". The vocals on the song were provided by Alonge. An additional track parodying Touché Amoré, "Brevé Canzoné" was released with a lyric video on November 18.

On March 10, 2017, Jarrod Alonge premiered a music video for a new Canadian Softball song titled "Fund Me". Much like the song, the video advertised the campaign for a full-length Canadian Softball album. The campaign met with its goal, and the album, Awkward & Depressed, was released on July 28, 2017. Music videos for "Your Validation", "Ohio Is For Emo Kids", and "Great Again" were uploaded to Jarrod Alonge's YouTube channel in promotion of the album.

=== Rectangles ===
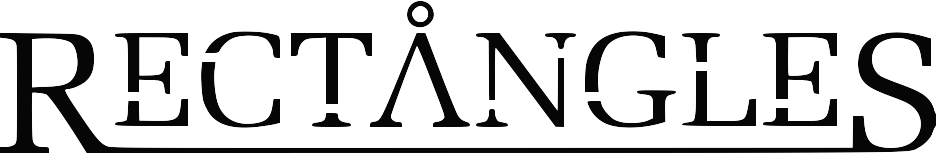
Rectangles logo

Rectangles (stylized as RECTÅNGLES) is a fictitious band from the United Kingdom that focuses on styles of progressive metalcore and djent. The band's name comes from the trend amongst progressive metalcore bands in which the band names consist of only plural nouns, such as Structures, Volumes and Monuments.

According to the band's Rock Sound Artist Profile, the band is composed of vocalist Jarrod Alonge and guitarist Andrew "Drewsif" Reynolds (who then went by Drewsif Stalin). Drewsif mentions and praises the band's new drummer, "Mac", before Alonge reveals that their drummer is actually a computer. They were formed in Winter 2009, originally using the name "Triangles". Alonge stated that the band's name was changed to Rectangles in 2010 as "there was another side to the band".

The band's only song "Cosmic Metaphysical Verisimilitude" featured vocals by Drewsif, who also produced the song. The song also featured guest vocals by Mike Semesky, formerly of Intervals. Another Rectangles song, "Waifu", is featured on the album's deluxe reissue.

During the final stages of releasing Canadian Softball's full-length debut, Alonge uploaded a new track from Rectangles titled "Cryptanalysis". Viewers were to decipher the hidden message in the song, and the first comment with the correct answer (which was “Send Nudes” spelled out with Morse code) won a prize pack featuring a Rectangles T-shirt, guitar strings, and more.

=== $wagCh0de ===
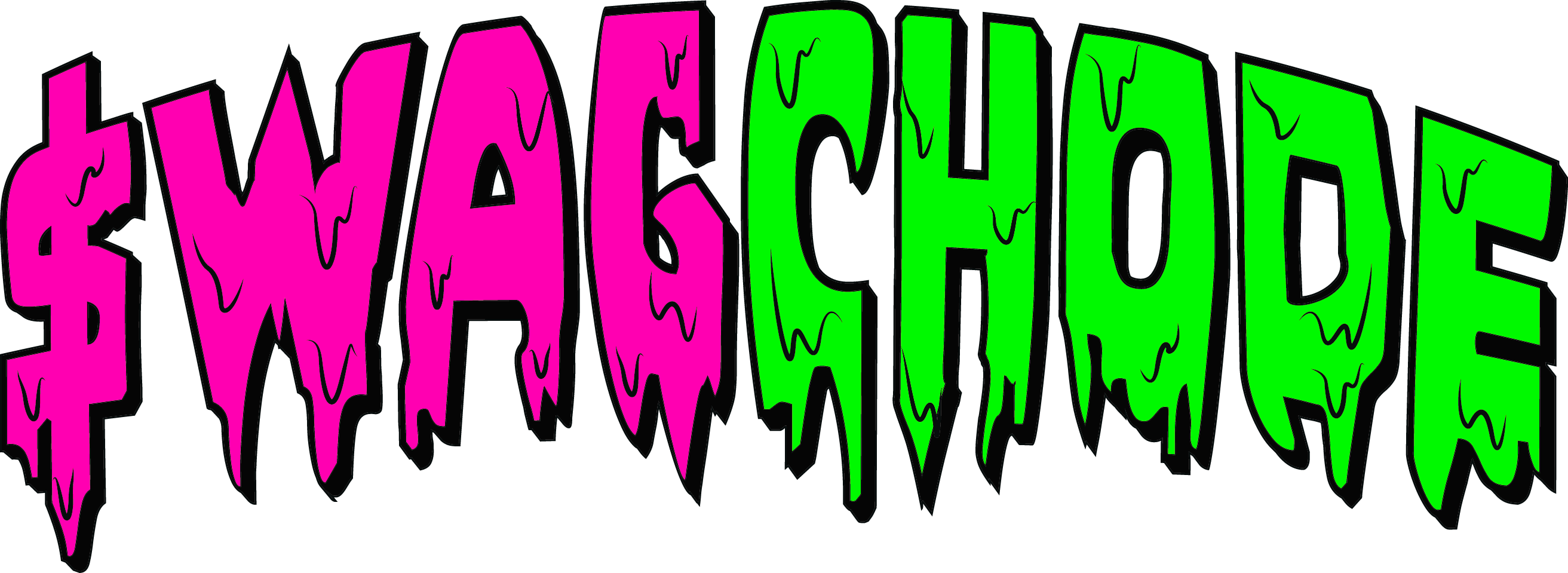
SwagChode logo

The seventh and final fictitious band to be featured on the album is $wagCh0de, a crunkcore and nu metal band from Albuquerque, New Mexico. The band is a parody of poorly-received crunkcore bands such as Brokencyde and Blood on the Dance Floor. As of recently, the band has also parodied Attila.

According to the band's Rock Sound Artist Profile, the band is composed of vocalist Jarrod Alonge (under the alias "Threev3") and programmer "FØuR". Threev3 claims that the band's influences include T.I., T-Pain, Ice-T, and Taylor Swift. He dismisses the negative reception directed towards the band, as well as pedophilia accusations in reference to Blood on the Dance Floor vocalist Dahvie Vanity. In the interview, the band is accompanied by "concerned parent" Peter Li who disapproves of the band's music.

Alonge performed the lead vocals on $wagCh0de's song "2 Freaky 4 da Club", accompanied by Brenden Worthington who performed the backing screams. A metalcore-influenced remix of the track was featured on the album's deluxe reissue: "2 Warped 4 da Remix".

$wagCh0de became active again in September 2016 through a new Facebook page using the alias "Thr33v3 'Chodezilla' Chodezak". On September 23, a song entitled "Pubic Apology" was released, parodying the Attila track "Public Apology", with a brief nod to the Sylar track "Assume". This song exhibits a nu metal style in place of their crunkcore style heard on Beating a Dead Horse.

== Music and Lyrics ==
Beating a Dead Horse is primarily a comedy album, with each song parodying common themes found in various alternative genres. The album's songs are "performed" by seven different fictitious bands: "Amidst the Grave's Demons", "Sunrise Skater Kids", "Chewed Up", "Vermicide Violence", "Canadian Softball", "Rectangles", and "$wagCh0de", with the bands' appearances and personalities reflecting stereotypes found within their particular genres.

=== Tracks 1–7 ===
The album's first track, "The Swimmer" by Amidst the Grave's Demons mimics the style of metalcore band Memphis May Fire, with the song's title and music video being a parody of "The Sinner". The song's lyrics parody ocean and drowning-related imagery used by metalcore bands such as The Amity Affliction. The song concludes with a southern metal section, referencing the style Memphis May Fire had on their debut album, Sleepwalking. A music video for "The Swimmer" was released on May 27.

"Love Me Back" by Sunrise Skater Kids is an upbeat pop punk song that parodies the obsessive, love-centered lyrics found within many songs of this style.

"Unbreakable" by Chewed Up is a melodic hardcore song that parodies The Ghost Inside, parodying the band's emotional and sometimes melodramatic lyrics. A music video for the track was released on September 25, featuring fan-submitted performance clips.

"Save My Life" by Amidst the Grave's Demons mimics the uplifting, hopeful lyrics of bands such as We Came as Romans and The Color Morale (dubbed "hopecore" in many online communities), but does so with a narcissistic tone. A music video for "Save My Life" was released on August 11, and parodied the video for "Suicide;Stigma" by The Color Morale. It was filmed at Warped Tour 2015 and featured guest appearances by multiple bands, including We Came as Romans, August Burns Red, Blessthefall, and PVRIS.

"Inconceivable Somatic Defecation" by Vermicide Violence (the band's name being a play on deathcore band Suicide Silence) parodies the violent and grotesque lyrics of deathcore and technical death metal bands such as Infant Annihilator and Cattle Decapitation. A music video for the song was released on vocalist Jared Dines' channel (as Alonge jokingly stated he didn't want to associate with the track) on August 26, 2015, acting as a parody of the music video for "Forced Gender Reassignment" by Cattle Decapitation.

The sixth track, "Take it Easycore" by Sunrise Skater Kids, as its title suggests, is a parody of easycore, a style that combines pop punk with the breakdowns and screaming typically found in metalcore. The song's friendship-oriented lyrics reference "In Friends We Trust" by French band Chunk! No, Captain Chunk!.

"Bite the Curb" by Chewed Up is a fast-paced hardcore punk song that satirizes bands that vainly attempt to have threatening and intimidating lyrics.

=== Tracks 8–15 ===
"Misogyneric" by Amidst the Grave's Demons mimics themes of betrayal found in many metalcore songs, and condescends to them by incorporating various internet memes into the lyrics. The song features an exaggerated, lengthy buildup to a breakdown, which is performed by Mattie Montgomery of For Today.

"Pop Punk Pizza Party" by Sunrise Skater Kids embodies many well-known stereotypes and characteristics surrounding pop punk subcultures, such as the love of pizza, glorification of friendship, and desires to leave home and tour. A demo version of the song was released in mid-2014, and it was professionally re-recorded for the album.

The tenth track "The Distance Between You and Me is Longer Than the Title of This Song" by Canadian Softball is a parody of Midwestern emo bands in the late 1990s and early 2000s, such as American Football. The song's lyrics mock the melancholy, lovesick lyrics of many bands of this style, and the song's title is a parody of the lengthy titles used by many emo bands. The end of the song also quotes several nonsensical tweets made by actor Jaden Smith that received viral attention online. This track in particular uses the style of midwest emo band Tiny Moving Parts.

"I'm So Scene 2.0" by Amidst the Grave's Demons is a parody of "scene" electronicore bands such as Attack Attack! and Abandon All Ships, and features frequent breakdowns, heavy use of synthesizers, and autotuned clean vocals. "I'm So Scene" was officially the first song written that would be featured on the album; a demo version was released in late 2013. The re-recorded version of the song had an additional bridge and electronic interlude.

"Cosmic Metaphysical Verisimilitude" by Rectangles is a parody of djent-influenced bands, featuring unusual time signatures, unconventional song structure (with no discernible choruses or verses) off-beat guitar riffs, and lyrics consisting of complex, yet nonsensical mathematical and scientific terminology.

"2 Freaky 4 da Club" by $wagCh0de satirizes the critically panned crunkcore group Brokencyde, with lyrics that contrast the themes typically found in bands of this style (for example, the lyrics promote drinking responsibly and abstaining from smoking).

"Hey Jarrod, What's That Song Again?" by Amidst the Grave's Demons is a medley consisting of snippets of twenty-two different metalcore and post-hardcore songs, with lyrics focusing on plagiarism. Its name is a reference to the song "Hey John, What's Your Name Again?" by The Devil Wears Prada.

The final track "Goodbye Baltimore (The Flute Song)" by Sunrise Skater Kids is a pop punk-influenced acoustic rock song that describes the singer's desire to leave his band and focus on playing the flute. Alonge performs three crude "flute" solos throughout the track, which are actually performed on a recorder despite the song's title and lyrics. The album concludes with an onomatopoeic "blegh", a vocal phrase used by some metalcore bands, which is a running joke throughout the album.

=== Tracks 16–21 ===
"Pray for Progress" by Vermicide Violence directly parodies Bring Me the Horizon, who shifted away from their well-known metalcore sound on their 2015 album That's the Spirit. Consequently, the song exhibits a post-hardcore and alternative rock sound rather than the deathcore sound heard on Vermicide Violence's previous material, although a metalcore verse is heard at the end of the track. The song's lyrics focus on the decision to shift genres and sarcastically ridicules those who criticize the band for doing so. The song's title is a parody of "Pray for Plagues" from Bring Me the Horizon's debut album Count Your Blessings, and the band's first official single.

"Brevé Canzoné" by Canadian Softball is no longer than 15 seconds long (although in its video, the song is misleadingly followed by over three minutes of silence). The song's title appropriately translates to "Short Song" and references American hardcore act Touche Amore.

"Waifu" by Rectangles was originally written as a demo song, with lyrics ridiculing obsessive fans of Japanese culture.

"First World Tragedy" by Sunrise Skater Kids stylistically parodies The Story So Far. The song's lyrics make use of the well-known "first world problem" meme, with the vocalist incessantly complaining about minor problems in his life. The end of the song features up to five vocal tracks played over one another, a technique used in some pop punk songs. The song was released as the album's fifth and final single, with an accompanying music video.

"2 Warped 4 da Remix" by $wagCh0de is a short remix of "2 Freaky 4 da Club" with added metalcore-influenced instrumentation.

"Suck my 401k" by Amidst the Grave's Demons parodies Attila, making frequent use the high-speed screaming technique used in many of the band's songs. The lyrics promote financial competence, referencing Attila vocalist Chris Fronzak's aptitude in the field. The title is a parody of the lyric "suck my fuck", used in the Attila track "About that Life".

== Track listing ==
All tracks are written by Jarrod Alonge, except where noted.

| No. | Title | Writer(s) | Performer | Length |
|---|---|---|---|---|
| 1. | "The Swimmer" | | Amidst the Grave's Demons | 3:52 |
| 2. | "Love Me Back" (featuring Cody Carson of Set It Off) | | Sunrise Skater Kids | 3:29 |
| 3. | "Unbreakable" | | Chewed Up | 4:26 |
| 4. | "Save My Life" | | Amidst the Grave's Demons | 4:07 |
| 5. | "Inconceivable Somatic Defecation" (featuring Jared Dines) | | Vermicide Violence | 3:40 |
| 6. | "Take It Easycore" | | Sunrise Skater Kids | 3:27 |
| 7. | "Bite the Curb" | Alonge, Joseph Mitra | Chewed Up | 2:09 |
| 8. | "Misogyneric" (featuring Mattie Montgomery, formerly of For Today) | | Amidst the Grave's Demons | 3:50 |
| 9. | "Pop Punk Pizza Party" (featuring Dave Days) | | Sunrise Skater Kids | 4:34 |
| 10. | "The Distance Between You and Me Is Longer Than the Title of This Song" | Alonge, Jamie Phillips | Canadian Softball | 3:46 |
| 11. | "I'm So Scene 2.0" (featuring Johnny Franck, formerly of Attack Attack!) | | Amidst the Grave's Demons | 4:42 |
| 12. | "Cosmic Metaphysical Verisimilitude" (featuring Mike Semesky, formerly of Intervals) | Alonge, Drewsif Stalin | Rectangles | 5:26 |
| 13. | "2 Freaky 4 da Club" | | $wagCh0de | 3:33 |
| 14. | "Hey Jarrod, What's That Song Again?" | | Amidst the Grave's Demons | 4:15 |
| 15. | "Goodbye Baltimore (The Flute Song)" | | Sunrise Skater Kids | 3:06 |
| Total length: | | | | 54:32 |

Deluxe reissue
| No. | Title | Writer(s) | Performer | Length |
|---|---|---|---|---|
| 16. | "Pray for Progress" | Alonge, Johnny Franck | Vermicide Violence | 4:07 |
| 17. | "Brevé Canzoné" ("Brief Song") | | Canadian Softball | 0:15 |
| 18. | "Waifu" | | Rectangles | 1:53 |
| 19. | "First World Tragedy" | | Sunrise Skater Kids | 5:00 |
| 20. | "2 Warped 4 da Remix" | | $wagCh0de | 1:16 |
| 21. | "Suck my 401k" (featuring Chris Linck of Attila) | | Amidst the Grave's Demons | 3:38 |
| Total length: | | | | 70:41 |

== Additional information ==
The following songs are included in the medley "Hey Jarrod, What's That Song Again?", albeit with different lyrics:

- "Writing on the Walls" by Underoath
- "HTML Rulez D00d" by The Devil Wears Prada
- "The Past Should Stay Dead" by Emarosa
- "Composure" by August Burns Red
- "Abigail" by Motionless in White
- "Final Episode (Let's Change the Channel)" by Asking Alexandria
- "Seduction" by Alesana
- "If I'm James Dean, You're Audrey Hepburn" by Sleeping With Sirens
- "Not Good Enough for the Truth in Cliché" by Escape the Fate
- "Shadow Moses" by Bring Me the Horizon
- "Faith or Forgiveness" by The Ghost Inside
- "2012" by The Word Alive
- "All it Takes For Your Dreams to Come True" by A Skylit Drive
- "Devastator" by For Today
- "Mr. Highway's Thinking About the End" by A Day to Remember
- "[&] Delinquents" by Woe, is Me
- "What This Means to Me" by I See Stars
- "Hooligans" by Issues
- "Second & Sebring" by Of Mice & Men
- "The Sinner" by Memphis May Fire
- "The Downfall Of Us All" by A Day to Remember
- "Stick Stickly" by Attack Attack!

== Personnel ==
- Jarrod Michael Alonge – Primary songwriting, production, guitar, lead vocals for Canadian Softball and $wagCh0de (tracks 10, 13, 17 and 20), recorder solo on "Goodbye Baltimore"
- Johnny Franck (ex-Attack Attack!) – Production (tracks 1–4, 6–11, 13–14, 16–17, 19–21), mastering (tracks 10, 13, 16–17, 19–21), guitar, programming, clean vocals (tracks 11 and 16)
- Andrew "Drewsif" Reynolds (credited as "Drewsif Stalin") – Production (tracks 5, 12, and 18), guitar, lead vocals for Rectangles (tracks 12 and 18)
- Michael "Mike" Martenson (Boys of Fall) – Lead vocals for Amidst the Grave's Demons (tracks 1, 4, 8, 11, 14 and 21), unclean vocals on tracks 6 and 16
- Varrick Jay (Insomniac) – Lead vocals for Sunrise Skater Kids (tracks 2, 6, 9, 15 and 19)
- David Thompson (Nanashi) – Lead vocals for Chewed Up (tracks 3 and 7)
- Jared Dines (Dissimulator, Rest, Repose) – Lead vocals for Vermicide Violence (track 5 only)
- Brenden MacKenzie Worthington (Separations) – Unclean vocals for $wagCh0de (tracks 13 and 20)

=== Additional personnel ===
- Dylan Werle – Digital Vocal Editing (tracks 1–4, 6–10, 11, 12, 14–16, 19)
- Joey Sturgis – Mastering (tracks 1–9, 11, 12 and 14)
- Varrick Jay, Ben Drake, James Dotzler, Sam Fassler (Insomniac) – Gang vocals on "Suck my 401k"
- Sam Fassler (Insomniac) – Additional vocals on "Unbreakable"
- Stevie T – Guest guitar solo on "Love Me Back"
- Chris Linck (Attila) – Guest guitar solo on "Suck my 401k"
- Joseph Mitra – Songwriting on "Bite the Curb"
- Jamie Phillips – Songwriting for "The Distance Between You and Me Is Longer Than the Title of This Song"
- Luke Oxendale – Production on "Goodbye Baltimore (The Flute Song)"
- Rob Alley – Vocal tracking on "Brevé Canzoné"
- Sarah Schmidt – Album artwork

== Chart performance ==
| Chart (2015) | Peak position |
|---|---|
| US Billboard Top Comedy Albums | 1 |
| US Billboard Top Heatseekers | 18 |
