= Anthony Vincent (musician) =

American musician and YouTuber (born 1987)

- Born: Anthony Vincent Valbiro; September 21, 1987 (age 38)
- Origin: Port Chester, New York, U.S.
- Occupations: YouTuber; singer; video producer; internet personality
- Instruments: Vocals; guitar; bass guitar; keyboards
- Years active: 2003–present

YouTube information
- Channel: Anthony Vincent
- Years active: 2014–present
- Genres: Music; comedy
- Subscribers: 3.67 million
- Views: 281.7 million
- Last updated: May 5, 2023

Anthony Vincent Valbiro (born September 21, 1987), also known by the online alias Ten Second Songs, is an American YouTuber and singer based in Port Chester, New York. He gained recognition for singing covers of popular songs in different styles and genres.

== Career ==
Vincent grew up in Port Chester, New York. He played bass in the band Rot in Pain, which also included his brother Frank. They released their debut EP in 2003. He began to sing in 2005 and formed the band Set the Charge with his brother Frank in 2007. He refined his vocal skills while studying under Ken Tamplin.

Vincent started an Internet radio channel with his brother, which later evolved into a music production business. He began to make videos on Fiverr and created his YouTube channel to promote his business. He gained a large following in 2014 after releasing a cover of Katy Perry's song "Dark Horse" in 20 different styles. In 2014, Set the Charge began playing shows as a four-piece band.

Vincent has collaborated with other artists such as Jared Dines and Eric Calderone. In 2018, Vincent and Calderone formed the band Riptide. In 2019, Vincent portrayed John Corabi in the Mötley Crüe biopic The Dirt.

Before 2021, Vincent primarily went by his online alias Ten Second Songs which originated when he composed songs on Fiverr. He rebranded his YouTube channel as Anthony Vincent in March of that year, wanting to move on and stated that it "was a name for a business not a personality."

== Discography ==
Solo albums

- Songs in 20 Styles or More (2017, as Ten Second Songs)
- Ten Second Songs, Vol. 1 (2020, as Ten Second Songs)
- Ten Second Songs, Vol. 2 (2020, as Ten Second Songs)

Rot in Pain

- Rot in Pain (2003 – EP)

Set the Charge

- Auditory Insemination (2015 – EP)
- Sky Goes On (2017)

Arch Echo

- Final Pitch (feat. Anthony Vincent & Adrián Terrazas-González) (2023)
