= Eric Calderone =

- Genres: Heavy metal
- Occupations: YouTuber; guitarist
- Instruments: Electric guitar
- Other name: Erock

YouTube information
- Channel: 331Erock
- Genre: Music
- Subscribers: 1.43 million
- Views: 350 million
- Last updated: May 11, 2026

Eric Calderone is an American guitarist and YouTuber. Calderone is best known for some of his videos on his YouTube channel "331Erock" in which he performs electric guitar renditions of songs from pop culture.

== Background and career ==
Calderone began playing an electric guitar in 2001 at the age of sixteen. He learned about musical orchestrations as a student at Berklee College of Music in Boston, Massachusetts. He also holds a degree in music from the University of Tampa.

Calderone's composition process started by transcribing a rough MIDI version of the melody and the tempo of the song that he wished to cover in a digital audio workstation. He then digitally added drum sections with layered recordings of his lessons. After adding an element of bass and sometimes other optional instruments such as electronic musical synthesizers, he played a real time version of his cover, followed by an audio mastering phase.

A surge in Calderone's popularity on YouTube began when he uploaded a heavy metal cover of the Lady Gaga song "Bad Romance" on October 21, 2010. In December 2015, Calderone graduated from the University of Tampa with a bachelor's degree in music. He has since then uploaded some videos of himself playing well-known songs (such as the Gotye and Kimbra song "Somebody That I Used to Know", the Carly Rae Jepsen song "Call Me Maybe" and the Psy song "Gangnam Style") as well as also recreating music from television shows (such as Attack on Titan, The Fresh Prince of Bel-Air, Pokémon and Game of Thrones), movie series (such as the three Star Wars movie trilogies and The Lord of the Rings movie trilogy) and video games (such as Super Mario Bros. and The Elder Scrolls V: Skyrim).

In 2018, Calderone formed the band Riptide with YouTuber and musician Anthony Vincent.

One of his most popular videos was his cover of the Disney song "Let It Go" (from Disney's 2013 animated musical fantasy film Frozen).

== Awards ==
In 2013, Calderone received the "Dimebag Darrell Shredder Award" at the Metal Hammer Golden Gods Awards.

== Discography ==
=== Full-length albums ===
- No More Heroes (2012)
- Deadlights (2015)

=== Extended plays ===
- Hollywood Shred (2010)
- Comics Meets Metal (2015)

=== Compilation albums ===
- Meets Metal Vol. 1 (The Early Year) (2015)
- Movies Meet Metal Vol. 1 (2015)
- The 80s Meet Metal (2015)
- Movies Meet Metal Vol. 2 (2015)
- Video Games Meet Metal (2015)
- Pop Meets Metal Vol. 1 (2015)
- Pop Meets Metal Vol. 2 (2015)
- Video Games Meet Metal Vol. 2 (2015)
- Youtube Meets Metal Various Vids (2015)
- Youtube Hits Meets Metal (2015)

== See also ==
- List of YouTubers
