= Shrezzers =

Russian metal band

- Also known as: Shredding Brazzers (2016–2017)
- Origin: Saint Petersburg, Russia
- Genres: Progressive metal; post hardcore; math rock
- Years active: 2016–present
- Label: Gentlepunks
- Members: Sam Arrag; Mark Mironov; Vyacheslav Kavlenas; Vitalii Molokanov; Artem Subichev
- Past members: Diego Silva Málaga

Shrezzers (stylized as SHREZZERS) is a Russian progressive metal band formed in 2016 in Saint Petersburg under the name Shredding Brazzers.

They are known for their use of a saxophone in almost every song.

== History ==
=== Formation, Relationships, and Arrag's departure (2016–2019) ===
The band was formed as Shredding Brazzers by drummer/vocalist Mark Mironov (Betraying the Martyrs), guitarists Vyacheslav "ChocoSlayc" Kavlenas and Vitalii Molokanov, saxophonist Artem Subichev, and Moroccan vocalist Issam "Sam" Arrag, in 2016. The band's name referred to shred guitar and used the name and yellow "ZZ" stylization of the pornographic website Brazzers. It was changed in 2017 to Shrezzers to avoid copyright issues.

The group gained attention after premiering their debut single, "Mystery", in July 2016, which featured the guitarist Dmitry Demyanenko (Shokran). It was especially praised for its saxophone solo, non-typical for the genre.

In November 2018, Shrezzers released an XXXTentacion cover, "SAD!", as a non-album single.

In January 2019, Shrezzers issued their debut album, Relationships, which featured numerous guest artists, including Ronnie Canizaro (Born of Osiris), Jared Dines, Aaron Marshall (Intervals), Aaron Matts (ten56., Betraying the Martyrs), Dmitry Demyanenko, Toli Wild (Wildways), and the Russian virtuoso guitarist Sergey Golovin. Relationships reached #12 on the iTunes Russia Rock Albums chart. In April, an instrumental version of the album, titled Relationshits, was released.

In May, Shrezzers debuted live, supporting Electric Callboy at their gigs in Moscow and Saint Petersburg. In September, the band played at Euroblast Festival in Cologne, Germany. In September and October, Shrezzers toured as a supporting act on Betraying the Martyrs' European Parasite Tour. In November, the band toured Japan with support from the local acts Paledusk, Victim of Deception, Ailiph Doepa, Lenz, and Her Name in Blood. Shortly after the tour, it was announced that Arrag had left the group.

=== SEX & SAX and Diego Silva period (2020–2025) ===
In January 2020, Shrezzers released the non-album single "Noodles", the last one featuring Sam Arrag on vocals, accompanied by a music video shot during their 2019 Japan tour.

In September, the Peruvian Diego Silva Málaga premiered as the band's new vocalist, on the single "Phoenix", also accompanied by a music video.

In February 2021, Shrezzers released the single "Demure", which features Veil of Maya's vocalist Lukas Magyar. In November, the single "UVB-76", featuring CJ McMahon of Thy Art Is Murder, came out.

In February 2023, the band issued their second album, SEX & SAX. It was followed in October by an instrumental version, titled SAX & SHRED.

In March 2025, the band released a music video for their 2021 single "UVB-76".

In May, the band's Instagram page announced vocalist Málaga's departure.

=== Arrag's return, new music, and touring (2025–present) ===
In June 2025, the band's original vocalist, Sam Arrag, was officially announced to have rejoined the band. A comeback single, "Restart", was released in July. That month, the band played their first live show in six years.

== Band members ==
Current

- Issam "Sam" Arrag – vocals (2016–2019, 2025-present)
- Mark Mironov – drums, vocals (2016–present)
- Vyacheslav "ChocoSlayc" Kavlenas – guitar (2016–present)
- Vitalii Molokanov – guitar (2016–present)
- Artem Subichev – saxophone (2016–present)

Past

- Diego "DYA" Silva Málaga – vocals (2020–2025)

== Discography ==
Studio albums

- Relationships (2019)
- SEX & SAX (2023)

Instrumental albums

- Relationshits (Instrumental) (2019)
- SAX & SHRED (2023)

Singles

- "Mystery (feat. Dmitry Demyanenko)" (2016)
- "Vivacious" (2016)
- "Spotlight" (2017)
- "Delight" (2017)
- "E.M.O.J.I.Q.U.E.E.N. (feat. Jared Dines & TWild)" (2017)
- "SAD!" (XXXTentacion cover)" (2018)
- "Anaraak (feat. Ronnie Canizaro)" (2019)
- "Noodles" (2020)
- "Phoenix" (2020)
- "Demure (feat. Lukas Magyar)" (2021)
- "UVB-76 (feat. CJ McMahon)" (2021)
- "Delight (acoustic)" (2022)
- "Gambit (feat. Adam Bentley)" (2022)
- "Libertad (feat. Michael Barr)" (2022)
- "Temperatura" (2023)
- "SAD! (Cover)" (2023) (re-recorded with Diego Silva's vocals)
- "Restart" (2025)

== Videography ==
List of music videos, showing year released and director
Title	Year	Director(s)
"Mystery"	2016	Aleksey Misyurov
"Vivacious"	2016	Vyacheslav Kavlenas, Aleksey Misyurov
"Spotlight"	2017	Aleksey Misyurov
"Delight"	2017	Vladimir Repin
"E.M.O.J.I.Q.U.E.E.N. (feat. Jared Dines and TWild)"	2017	Vladimir Repin
"SAD!"	2018	Igor Khramkov
"Anaraak (feat. Ronnie Canizaro)"	2019	Alexander Ivanov
"Reminiscent (feat. Natly)"	2019	Alexander Ivanov
"Noodles"	2020	Alexander Ivanov
"Phoenix"	2020	Alexander Ivanov
"Delight (Acoustic)"	2022	
"UVB-76"	2025	Ave Senshi
