= Oni (band) =

Canadian progressive metal band

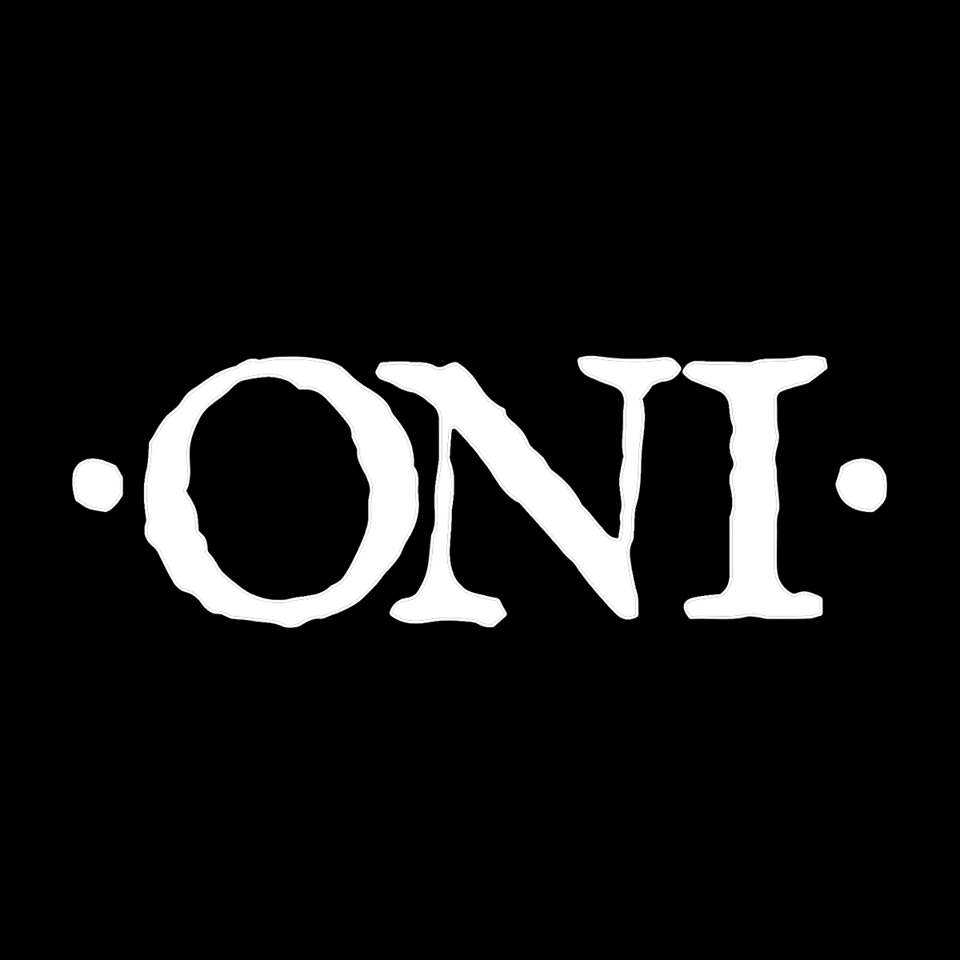

Background information
- Origin: Ontario, Canada and George Town, Cayman Islands
- Genres: Metalcore, progressive metal
- Years active: 2014–present
- Labels: Ironshore, Metal Blade, Blacklight Media
- Members: Jake Oni
- Past members: Martin Andres; Chase Bryant; Johnny D; Jared Dines; Joe Greulich; Brandon White
- Website: onimusic.com

Oni is a metalcore band formed in Canada by singer Jake Oni. They have released three albums and three EPs as of 2025.

== History ==
=== 2014–2021: Ironshore and early collaborations ===
Oni formed in 2014. They released their debut album, Ironshore, in 2016, on Black Light Media Records and Metal Blade Records. Longtime Lamb of God producer Josh Wilbur produced and mixed the album and the song "The Only Cure" featured Lamb of God frontman Randy Blythe.

Wilbur produced Oni's Alone EP, released by Blacklight Media/Metal Blade in 2019. The same year, Jake Oni contributed guest vocals to Lamb of God guitarist Mark Morton's solo album, Anesthetic. He appeared on the song "The Never," alongside Chuck Billy, David Ellefson, and Roy Mayorga, and is credited as co-writer on "Cross Off," featuring late Linkin Park vocalist Chester Bennington.

=== 2022–2023: Loathing Light and The Silver Line ===
Morton and Wilbur co-wrote and produced "The Lie," released by Oni in February 2022, with Jake credited as the only member of the band. American trap metal duo City Morgue appeared on another song called "War Ender", with a music video being released on April 13.

On April 28, 2022, Oni announced their second album, Loathing Light, which was released on June 17. The band also released a music video for the new song "Secrets", which features Iggy Pop and Randy Blythe from Lamb of God.

In June 2023, Oni released "Silence In A Room Of Lies", a collaboration with Jared Dines. A music video for the song was released alongside it, which features footage from a documentary shot by Dines.

On August 24, 2023, Oni released a new song, "Aura", featuring Howard Jones (Light the Torch, ex-Killswitch Engage) and Josh Gilbert (Spiritbox, ex-As I Lay Dying), and also announced their third album, The Silver Line. It would be released on September 22.

=== 2024–present: Addition of Jared Dines and Genesis EP ===
Oni released multiple singles in 2024, all produced by Josh Gilbert (Spiritbox, ex-As I Lay Dying). "Control" was released on May 17, "Walk Away" was released on August 23, and "Deja Vu" was released on October 11. That year, Jared Dines was brought on as a permanent member of the band. Dines had previously been a touring member.

In December 2024, Oni announced that it would release a new EP called Genesis on January 24 2025.

In February 2025, it was announced that Oni would be heading out on tour with Pop Evil in North America. They also announced that they would be performing at 2025's edition of Radar Festival and playing their first UK headline show in London.

== Musical style and associated acts ==
Oni's sound has evolved over time. Their debut album Ironshore is a progressive metal album, heavily featuring a very unusual electronic instrument called the xylosynth. Loathing Light shifted towards more metalcore-focused sound, with much less electronic elements and more straightforward songwriting. The Silver Line leaned more into a more modern progressive metalcore sound, with a heavier emphasis on clean vocals.

Oni has toured with Gojira, Max & Iggor Cavalera, The Devin Townsend Project, Death Angel, Megadeth and Children of Bodom, Starset, Crown The Empire. They also performed at Ozzfest Meets Knotfest with Randy Blythe.

== Members ==
=== Current members ===
- Jake Oni – vocals (2014–present)

=== Current touring musicians ===
- Nick Villarreal – bass (2022–present)
- Dylan Roy – drums (2024–present)
- Eric Palmer – guitar (2024–present)

=== Former members ===
- Martin Andres – guitar (2014–2019)
- Brandon White – guitar, backing vocals (2014–2019)
- Chase Bryant – bass (2014–2019)
- Johnny D – xylosynth (2014–2019)
- Joe Greulich – drums (2014–2019)
- Jared Dines – guitar, backing vocals (2024–2025)

=== Former touring musicians ===
- Johnuel Hasney – guitar, backing vocals (2022–2024)
- Julian Gargiulo - guitar, backing vocals (2022–2024)
- James Knoerl – drums (2022–2023)

== Discography ==
Studio albums

- Ironshore (2016)
- Loathing Light (2022)
- The Silver Line (2023)
- Obey No Illusion (2027)

=== EPs ===
- Alone (2019)
- Genesis (2025)
- Genesis, Pt. II (2025)

=== Singles ===
List of singles, with selected chart positions, showing year released and album name
Title	Year	Peak Chart Positions	Album
Title	Year	US Main. Rock	Album
"Eternal Recurrence"	2016	—	Ironshore
"Alone"	2019	—	Alone EP
"The Lie"	2022	—	Loathing Light
"War Ender" (feat. City Morgue)	2022	—	Loathing Light
"Secrets" (feat. Randy Blythe and Iggy Pop)	2022	—	Loathing Light
"Silence In A Room Of Lies" (feat. Jared Dines)	2023	—	The Silver Line
"Underneath My Skin" (feat. Kellin Quinn)	2023	—	The Silver Line
"Aura" (feat. Howard Jones and Josh Gilbert)	2023	—	The Silver Line
"Silhouette"	2023	32	The Silver Line
"Spark"	2023	—	The Silver Line
"Control"	2024	31	Genesis EP
"Walk Away" (feat. Lil Aaron)	2024	—	Genesis EP
"Deja Vu"	2024	—	Genesis EP
"Realign"	2024	—	Genesis EP
"Erase"	2025	—	Genesis EP
"Shouldn't Feel This Way"	2025	—	Non-album single
"Float"	2025	—	Genesis Part II

=== Music videos ===
Selected music videos
Year	Song	Album	Director(s)
2016	"Eternal Recurrence"	Ironshore	Abraham Roofeh
2018	"Spawn and Feed"	Ironshore	Unknown
2022	"War Ender"	Loathing Light	Zev Deans
2022	"Secrets"	Loathing Light	Jeremy Danger and Travis Shinn
2022	"Heart and Stone"	Loathing Light	Unknown
2022	"Against My Sins"	Loathing Light	Unknown
2022	"Iron Heart"	Non-album single	Unknown
2023	"Silence In a Room of Lies"	The Silver Line	Unknown
2023	"Aura"	The Silver Line	Jensen Noen
2023	"Silhouette"	The Silver Line	Unknown
2023	"Spark"	The Silver Line	Jensen Noen
2024	"Control"	Genesis EP	Ben Watanabe and Pedro Marcelino
2024	"Walk Away"	Genesis EP	Pedro Marcelino
2024	"Deja Vu"	Genesis EP	Patrick Tohill
2024	"Realign"	Genesis EP	Stubs Phillips
2025	"Erase"	Genesis EP	Stubs Phillips
2025	"Shouldn't Feel This Way"		Stubs Phillips
2025	"What I've Become"	Genesis Pt. II EP	Richard Naumoff & Stetson Whitworth
2026	"Haunted"	Obey No Illusion	Dylan Hryciuk
2026	"Losing My Religion"	Obey No Illusion	Dylan Hryciuk
