= Kinda Hard =

Studio album by Bilmuri
- Released: April 10, 2026
- Length: 35:28
- Label: Columbia
- Producers: Drew Fulk; Jameson Roper; Johnny Franck

Bilmuri chronology
American Motor Sports (2024)	Kinda Hard (2026)

Singles from Kinda Hard
- 1. "More Than Hate" Released: June 27, 2025; 2. "Hard 2 Tell" Released: December 5, 2025; 3. "Twice" Released: February 6, 2026; 4. "Always Let You Down" Released: March 13, 2026; 5. "Where to Find Me" Released: April 7, 2026

Kinda Hard is the fifteenth album by American singer-songwriter and musician Bilmuri. It was released on April 10, 2026, via Columbia Records. The album was preceded by five singles: "More Than Hate", "Hard 2 Tell", "Twice", "Always Let You Down" and "Where to Find Me". It debuted on the Billboard 200, his first entry on the chart. The album also reached number ten on the UK Rock & Metal Albums chart.

== Background ==
In June 2025, Bilmuri released a new song titled, "More Than Hate", which led to signs that more music would soon follow. In August, he revealed in an interview with Loudwire that the record was "done." During the process, he said he "drove himself half insane," as he was worrying about having to make a good follow up album after American Motor Sports (2024). However, he got over this fear by making what he felt "was interesting." He described the album as "ridiculous, in a great way."

On February 6, 2026, Bilmuri announced the title of the new album, Kinda Hard, with a release date for April 10. He also embarked on a North American headlining tour from April to October 2026, in support of the album.

== Singles ==
"More Than Hate" was released on June 27, 2025, as the lead single from the album. The song was later serviced for radio airplay. On December 5, "Hard 2 Tell" was released as the album's second single. The album's third single, "Twice" was released on February 6, 2026. The album's fourth single was released on March 13, titled "Always Let You Down", featuring Jeremy McKinnon of A Day to Remember. The fifth single from the album, "Where to Find Me" featuring Novelists was released on April 7.

== Critical reception ==
Professional ratings
Review scores
Source	Rating
AllMusic	3/5 stars
The Arts Desk	3/5 stars
Kerrang!	4/5
Sputnikmusic	3.5/5

The album was met with positive reviews from music critics. James Hingle of Kerrang! described the album as "eccentric and full of curveballs." Staff writer Charlie of Sputnikmusic wrote, "Kinda Hard mostly executes on the Bilmuri formula with satisfying results. The album balances Johnny's typical brand of country-tinged post-hardcore and breakup-ridden lyricism that usually culminates in incredibly infectious choruses." However, he felt it "comes across as less adventurous than earlier Bilmuri releases," but said, "its high points very much belong in the pantheon of Johnny's greatest hits and are perfectly in line with the approaching summer season; just don't expect it to elevate the formula in any meaningful way." In a similar review, Joseph Ine of Melodic Magazine stated the album "isn't trying to reinvent Bilmuri's sound," though he remarked, "The hooks hit, the production feels tight, and the pacing keeps things moving without dragging."

== Commercial performance ==
Kinda Hard debuted at number 108 on the Billboard 200. The album also peaked at number 28 and number five on the US Top Rock & Alternative Albums and US Top Hard Rock Albums charts, respectively. In the UK, the album peaked at number 50 on the UK Albums Sales Chart, as well as reaching number 10 on the UK Rock & Metal Albums.

The songs "Kinda Hard", "Worst Part of You", "Rock Bottom", "Shyt Fyst" and "Back, Then" reached the US Hot Hard Rock Songs chart, at numbers 19, 17, 12, 24 and 25, respectively.

== Track listing ==
No.	Title	Writer(s)	Length
1.	"Kinda Hard"		1:20
2.	"Twice"	Johnny Franck; Will Carlson; Knox Morris; Drew Fulk; Gabi Rose	3:44
3.	"Worst Part of You"	Franck; Carlson; Sofia Quinn; Castle	2:54
4.	"Rock Bottom"	Franck; Carlson; Geoff Warburton	2:47
5.	"More Than Hate"	Franck; Carlson; Sam Hollander	3:27
6.	"Hard 2 Tell"		2:59
7.	"Where To Find Me" (featuring Novelists)		2:45
8.	"St4rf1sh Spr34dr"		0:31
9.	"Shyt Fyst"		3:07
10.	"Always Let You Down" (featuring A Day to Remember)		3:04
11.	"Back, Then"		2:44
12.	"Honest"		2:52
13.	"Waves"		3:14
Total length:			35:28

== Charts ==
Chart performance for Kinda Hard
Chart (2026)	Peak position
Scottish Albums (Official Charts)	71
UK Albums Sales (OCC)	50
UK Rock & Metal Albums (Official Charts)	10
US Billboard 200	108
US Top Rock & Alternative Albums (Billboard)	28
