= Awkward & Depressed =

Studio album by Canadian Softball
- Released: July 28, 2017
- Recorded: April – June 2017
- Studio: Franck Studios in Westerville, OH
- Genre: Parody music; comedy rock; emo; spoken word; indie rock; shoegaze; math rock; post-hardcore; screamo; pop punk
- Label: Independent
- Producer: Johnny Franck, Jarrod Alonge

Jarrod Alonge chronology
No Words Spoken (2017)	Awkward & Depressed (2017)	Covers, Vol. 2 (2017)

Singles from Awkward & Depressed
- 1. "Fund Me" Released: March 10, 2017; 2. "Your Validation" Released: July 14, 2017; 3. "Ohio Is for Emo Kids" Released: July 21, 2017; 4. "Great Again" Released: July 27, 2017

Professional ratings
Review scores
Source	Rating
Collegian	Recommended
Punk News	3.5/5 stars

Awkward & Depressed is the third studio album by internet comedian Jarrod Alonge, released under the moniker of his fictitious emo band Canadian Softball, on July 28, 2017. The album primarily satirizes and parodies tropes found in the emo genre, primarily from the early 2010s emo revival. The album directly parodies bands such as American Football, Modern Baseball, Hawthorne Heights and Hotel Books. The album also features a cover of "Seven" by Sunny Day Real Estate, a first for Alonge.

== Background ==
Similar to Alonge's previous releases, Awkward & Depressed was crowdfunded through an Indiegogo campaign, which raised over $26,000. The album and crowdfunding campaign were announced on March 10 with the release of the "Fund Me" music video. Campaign perks included a signed poster, a CD and digital download of the album, a T-shirt and hat, and a wall flag. While recording the album, Alonge released the EPs Covers, Vol. 1 and No Words Spoken by his non-comedic post-hardcore project CrazyEightyEight.

On July 7, 2017, Alonge released an official trailer for the album, revealing a 13-song track list with a sample for each song. The trailer revealed that the album would contain a cover of Sunny Day Real Estate's "Seven" along with Hotel Books providing guest vocals on the song "Cut the Cord." "Your Validation" was the first song to be released from the album, with the music video premiering on YouTube on July 14. A lyric video for the song "Ohio Is for Emo Kids" was released on July 21. The album's second music video, "Great Again," was released on July 27, a day before the album's release.

== Music and lyrics ==
The album's first track, "Average Joe," mimics emo bands' tendency to write songs about being an "average person" and complaining about being unpopular despite being signed to a record label and having many fans. In reference to the song, Alonge stated that he was "essentially just a poor man's Bert McCracken." The song "Your Validation" is a parody of Modern Baseball with the song's name referencing their song "Your Graduation" from the album You're Gonna Miss It All. The song describes various scene phases a person goes through with the music video showing pictures of fellow YouTube comedian/musician Jared Dines going through a hardcore punk phase, an emo phase, and a scene phase, among others. The next song, "Mathematical," is a parody of American Football and math rock with the song featuring many time and tempo changes. The song becomes more chaotic as it goes on before Alonge stops it and refers to it as "musical gibberish." The title of "Great Again" is a reference to Donald Trump's campaign slogan of "Make America great again" from the 2016 presidential election. The song's lyrics glamorize American life in the 1950s, such as graduating from college debt free with a high-paying job, normalized homophobia, and calling the cops on an African-American man for no reason. The track is done in the style of The Wonder Years and the name likely references their album The Greatest Generation. The track "Mumble" features Alonge unintelligibly mumbling throughout the song with lyrics featuring communist propaganda. "Lysergide" is a shoegaze-influenced song reminiscent of new Title Fight material as well as dream-pop band Turnover with the lyrics describing a drug trip with the vocals becoming distorted near the end.

The song "Seven" is a straightforward cover of the song originally by Sunny Day Real Estate. The title of the song "Peev Shalpatine" is a reference to the Star Wars character Sheev Palpatine. The song's lyrics predominately feature Alonge re-enacting "The Tragedy of Darth Plagueis the Wise" from Star Wars Episode III: Revenge of the Sith in the style of spoken word emo/post-hardcore bands like Hotel Books, Listener, and La Dispute. The song was originally written by Johnny Franck for his musical project Bilmuri, but didn't end up on the album and was instead given to Jarrod. The next song, "Weebi FM," is a post-hardcore parody in the style of Hawthorne Heights with the song's title being a reference to "Niki FM". The song's lyrics describe a young man that has been friend zoned by a girl despite being nice toward her and his distress over it. "Cut the Cord" features guest vocals from Hotel Books. The lyrics are seemingly about a man ending a relationship with a person before it is revealed at the end that he is actually ending his cable services with Comcast. "United We Skramz" is a screamo song in the style of Pg. 99. The song begins with an audio clip of Donald Trump saying that no other president has been treated as badly as he has while the lyrics reference the assassinations of John F. Kennedy, James Garfield, and Abraham Lincoln. This clip references the Nirvana clip in the intro of Pg. 99's song "In Love With an Apparition." "Ohio Is for Emo Kids" is a medley consisting of parody snippets of twenty different emo, pop punk, post-hardcore, and alternative rock songs. (Note: The songs parodied or referenced in this medley include, in the order that they appear: "I'm Not Okay (I Promise)" by My Chemical Romance, "Thnks Fr Th Mmrs" by Fall Out Boy, "I Write Sins, Not Tragedies" by Panic! At The Disco, "Ohio Is For Lovers" by Hawthorne Heights, "Walls" by Emery, "The Kill" by 30 Seconds to Mars, "Face Down" by Red Jumpsuit Apparatus, "A Boy Brushed Red Living in Black and White" by Underoath, "Pressure" by Paramore, "My Heroine" by Silverstein, "Bring Me to Life" by Evanescence, "The Priest and the Matador" by Senses Fail, "Knives and Pens" by Black Veil Brides, "I Miss You" by Blink-182, "The Taste of Ink" by The Used, "Numb" by Linkin Park, "Miss Murder" by AFI, "MakeDamnSure" by Taking Back Sunday, "Helena" by My Chemical Romance, and "The Word 'Best Friend' Become Redefined" by Chiodos.) In addition to focusing on the songs' melodramatic nature (referencing things such as suicide, being bullied, losing a job, and missing a concert), the song also lampoons their often erroneous association with the emo genre, making reference to proper emo acts such as Jawbreaker, Rites of Spring, Sunny Day Real Estate, and Pinkerton-era Weezer. The song ends with the opening riff from "The Words 'Best Friend' Become Redefined" by Chiodos before it is abruptly cut-off with Alonge stating that the song is running too long. The song's title is a reference to "Ohio Is for Lovers" by Hawthorne Heights. The album's final song, "Pink Wednesday," is an acoustic rock song in the style of Tigers Jaw with lyrics inspired by the 2004 film Mean Girls.

== Track listing ==
All tracks are written by Jarrod Alonge, except where noted.

No.	Title	Writer(s)	Length
1.	"Average Joe"		2:18
2.	"Your Validation"		3:23
3.	"Mathematical"	Alonge, Franck	2:54
4.	"Great Again"		3:32
5.	"Mumble"	Alonge, Franck	2:04
6.	"Lysergide"	Alonge, Franck	3:15
7.	"Seven" (Sunny Day Real Estate cover)	Jeremy Enigk, Dan Hoerner	3:26
8.	"Peev Shalpatine"	Alonge, Franck	2:24
9.	"Weebi FM"		3:20
10.	"Cut the Cord" (feat. Hotel Books)	Alonge, Franck, Cam Smith	2:36
11.	"United We Skramz"		2:16
12.	"Ohio Is for Emo Kids"	Alonge, et al.: Jarrod Alonge; Frank Iero; Matt Pelissier; Ray Toro; Gerard Way; Mikey Way; Pete Wentz; Patrick Stump; Ryan Ross; Brendon Urie; Spencer Smith; JT Woodruff; Micah Carli; Casey Calvert; Matt Ridenour; Eron Bucciarelli; Toby Morrell; Devin Shelton; Josh Head; Matt Carter; Joel Green; Seth Studley; Jared Leto; Ronnie Winter; Aaron Gillespie; Spencer Chamberlain; Timothy McTague; Grant Brandell; James Smith; Christopher Dudley; Hayley Williams; Josh Farro; Shane Told; Amy Lee; Ben Moody; David Hodges; Mike Glita; Buddy Nielsen; Dan Trapp; Heath Saraceno; Garrett Zablocki; Andy Biersack; Chris Hollywood; Mike Stamper; Tom DeLonge; Mark Hoppus; Travis Barker; Quinn Allman; Jeph Howard; Bert McCracken; Branden Steineckert; Chester Bennington; Mike Shinoda; Brad Delson; Dave Farrell; Joe Hahn; Rob Bourdon; Jade Puget; Davey Havok; Adam Carson; Hunter Burgan; Adam Lazzara; Fred Mascherino; Mark O'Connell; Ed Reyes; Matt Rubano; Craig Owens; Jason Hale; Pat McManaman; Matt Goddard; Derrick Frost; Bradley Bell	4:52
13.	"Pink Wednesday"		4:02

CD version bonus tracks
No.	Title	Writer(s)	Length
14.	"The Distance Between You and Me Is Longer Than the Title of This Song"	Alonge, Jamie Phillips, Jaden Smith	3:46
15.	"Brevé Canzoné" ("Brief Song")		0:15
16.	"Fund Me"		3:25

== Personnel ==
Canadian Softball

- Jarrod Alonge – vocals, guitar, drum programming, primary songwriting, production

Additional personnel

- Hotel Books – vocals on track 10
- Mike Martenson – unclean vocals on tracks 9 and 12, vocal editing on tracks 1, 2, 4, 9 and 13
- Johnny Franck – production, mixing, engineering, mastering
- Dylan Werle – vocal editing on track 12
- Rob Alley – vocal tracking on track 15
- David Leøng – artwork

== Chart performance ==
Chart (2017)	Peak position
US Billboard Top Comedy Albums	1
US Billboard Top Heatseekers	19
US Billboard Independent Albums	39
