= Friendville (album) =

Studio album by Sunrise Skater Kids
- Released: April 1, 2016
- Recorded: January – February 2016
- Genre: Parody; comedy rock; pop punk; skate punk; melodic hardcore; metalcore; easycore
- Length: 40:36; 60:12 (with bonus tracks)
- Label: Self-released
- Producer: Johnny Franck, Sam Pura, Jarrod Alonge

Jarrod Alonge chronology
| Beating a Dead Horse (2015) | Friendville (2016) | Space Zombies EP (2016) |

Singles from Friendville
- 1. "All the Old Things" Released: January 29, 2016; 2. "Pit Warrior" Released: March 16, 2016; 3. "The Catchy One" Released: March 21, 2016; 4. "Rylo Ken" Released: March 28, 2016; 5. "Trigger Warning" Released: March 31, 2016; 6. "Friendville" Released: June 13, 2016

Friendville is the second album by YouTube comedian Jarrod Alonge, released under the moniker of his fictitious pop punk band Sunrise Skater Kids, on April 1, 2016. The album primarily satirizes and parodies the tropes and characteristics of the pop punk genre, but also shifts focus to the melodic hardcore and metalcore genres. Direct parodies of specific bands within the pop punk genre such as Blink-182, NOFX, Mayday Parade, Neck Deep and Knuckle Puck are also included.

The album was a critical and commercial success, reaching number 1 on the Billboard Top Comedy Albums chart, number 12 on the Top Heatseekers chart, and number 37 on the Top Independent Albums chart.

== Background ==
Similarly to Alonge's previous album Beating a Dead Horse, Friendville was produced using revenue generated from an Indiegogo crowdfunding campaign that encompassed the month of February 2016.

The initial aim was to raise $10,000 in order to fund a Sunrise Skater Kids EP, with a secondary aim of raising $20,000 in order to fund a full-length album should the campaign become overfunded. These targets were both massively surpassed with total funds reaching over $28,000 towards the end of the campaign, which opened up the possibility of Sunrise Skater Kids going on tour to promote the full-length album. Alonge had already recorded an album's worth of material before the fundraiser had ended, stating that this was a "gamble" on his part as he was unsure of whether the album would be funded enough to allow for this. The fundraiser offered numerous perks to fans; including wall posters, named shout outs in future Alonge videos, merchandise and personal Skype calls between fans and Alonge himself.

A teaser for one of the tracks from the upcoming album, "All the Old Things", was released on January 26, 2016, with the full track being released three days later. The track is a medley, consisting of parodied alternate lyrics based on popular pop punk tracks from the genre's era of mainstream popularity during the early to mid 2000s. The track is unofficially recognized as a follow-up to "Hey Jarrod, What's That Song Again?", a metalcore-themed medley on Beating a Dead Horse.

The album's track list, cover art and guest vocalists were announced on February 26, 2016. The standard physical editions and digital editions of the album also feature all of the previously released Sunrise Skater Kids songs from Alonge's previous album, free of charge. Alonge stated that these songs were included to allow for his fans to receive the "full pop punk experience".

Following the fundraising campaign, a teaser featuring snippets of the album's eleven tracks was posted to Alonge's YouTube channel on March 9, 2016. A music video for the second single from the album, Pit Warrior, was released on March 16, 2016. A lyric video for the third single, The Catchy One, was released on March 21, 2016. A music video for the fourth single, Rylo Ken, was released on March 28, 2016.

On March 30, 2016, Friendville and the entirety of Alonge's discography were withdrawn from iTunes for undisclosed reasons of "editorial discretion", two days before the album's intended release on the Apple platforms. Alonge pitched in on the issue by advising fans who have pre-ordered the album on iTunes, to pre-order the album again through other means such as through Google Play, where the album can still be purchased without any issues. All orders for the album claimed from Indiegogo are still being delivered as planned.

== Lyrical themes and sound ==
Alonge briefly explained the lyrical themes of each song on the album in a post on his official Facebook page. Jokingly, he stated that the song "Pit Warrior" addressed the issue of people "having no spatial awareness at shows", adding that the song sounded like Four Year Strong's material.

The fifth song on the album, "Rylo Ken", is an acoustic track which, lyrically, incorporates references to the character of "Kylo Ren", an antagonist from the 2015 film Star Wars: The Force Awakens, into the angst-ridden, rebellious lyrics of many pop punk songs. Alonge has expressed on multiple occasions that he is an avid fan of the Star Wars series. The sixth track on the album, "Trigger Warning", satirizes the social justice warrior subculture frequently ridiculed on the Internet. While the song is primarily pop punk, the song's upbeat tone drastically changes as a metalcore and deathcore-influenced section makes up the second half of the song.

On the seventh track "Exposure Bank", Alonge stated that it is an "ultra-sarcastic song about making money in music, [and it is] also an ode to 90s punk rock bands like MxPx and NOFX". The song is purposefully poorly produced to reflect the 90's era of pop punk in which many bands would produce their albums with low-quality equipment in venues that are not optimised for effective recording. The eighth track on the album, "Rain on My Parade", is a parody of Mayday Parade's song "Miserable at Best".

The second and ninth tracks on the album, "The Catchy One" and "Nothing Special", satirize the generic lyrical themes and song structures commonly found in local, unsigned pop punk bands. "Nothing Special" in particular makes references to the diminished creative efforts that usually tend to occur in "filler" songs towards the end of albums, with less time and resources being allocated to said songs. The final track on the album, "Mother's Milk", is lyrically described as addressing the issue of growing up, a common theme in pop-punk music.

== Reception ==
Professional ratings
Review scores
| Source | Rating |
|---|---|
| Revivalmedia.co.uk | 9/10 |
| Kill Your Stereo | 85/100 |

An early review of the album from Revivalmedia.co.uk awarded the album a score of 9/10, stating that "with the whole album being a solid investment of your money and [featuring] the 5 older tracks to come with [it] as well, Jarrod Alonge has hit the final nail on the proverbial pop punk head and created a fun album full of fun little surprises and will be a cult classic amongst his following. Some people might not be able to take it seriously, and in fairness it's not supposed to [be taken seriously], but as an album it does quite a lot of great things."

Kill Your Stereo's review of the album was also positive, awarding the album a score of 85/100. The review states that "if you’re a fan of the current pop-punk, Warped Tour era of bands and you grew up on the "veteran" bands of this scene, then ‘Friendville’ is really going to be for you", commenting on the album's humour by adding that Friendville is "a genuinely funny record that will pump you up, make you bang your head and have some good laughs, and sometimes all of those will happen at the same time."

== Track listing ==
All music and lyrics written by Jarrod Alonge.

| No. | Title | Length |
|---|---|---|
| 1. | "Garage Door" (featuring JB Brubaker) | 4:03 |
| 2. | "The Catchy One" | 3:36 |
| 3. | "Pit Warrior" (featuring Dave Stephens) | 3:31 |
| 4. | "Friendville" | 3:43 |
| 5. | "Rylo Ken" | 2:36 |
| 6. | "Trigger Warning" (featuring Johnny Franck) | 3:24 |
| 7. | "Exposure Bank" | 1:58 |
| 8. | "Rain on My Parade" | 4:22 |
| 9. | "Nothing Special" (featuring Patty Walters) | 3:04 |
| 10. | "All the Old Things" (featuring Christina Rotondo) | 4:18 |
| 11. | "Mother's Milk" | 6:01 |
| Total length: | | 40:36 |

Bonus tracks (from Beating a Dead Horse)
| No. | Title | Length |
|---|---|---|
| 12. | "First World Tragedy" | 5:00 |
| 13. | "Love Me Back" (featuring Cody Carson) | 3:29 |
| 14. | "Take it Easycore" | 3:27 |
| 15. | "Pop Punk Pizza Party" (featuring Dave Days) | 4:34 |
| 16. | "Goodbye Baltimore (The Flute Song)" | 3:06 |
| Total length: | | 60:12 |

== Additional information ==
The following songs are included in the medley "All the Old Things", albeit with different lyrics:

- "Dance, Dance" by Fall Out Boy
- "My Own Worst Enemy" by Lit
- "Fat Lip" by Sum 41
- "The Rock Show" by Blink-182
- "I'm Just a Kid" by Simple Plan
- "1985" by Bowling for Soup
- "You're Gonna Go Far, Kid" by The Offspring
- "Honestly" by Cartel
- "Dirty Little Secret" by The All-American Rejects
- "Sk8er Boi" by Avril Lavigne
- "Everything Is Alright" by Motion City Soundtrack
- "My Friends Over You" by New Found Glory
- "Don't Call Me White" by NOFX
- "The Anthem" by Good Charlotte
- "American Idiot" by Green Day
- "Misery Business" by Paramore
- "Dear Maria, Count Me In" by All Time Low
- "The Middle" by Jimmy Eat World
- "Sugar, We're Goin Down" by Fall Out Boy
- "Ocean Avenue" by Yellowcard
- "All the Small Things" by Blink-182

== Personnel ==
Sunrise Skater Kids

- Varrick Jay (Insomniac) - lead vocals
- Jarrod Alonge - songwriting, guitar, recorder solo on track 16

Additional personnel

- Johnny Franck - production, engineering, mixing (tracks 1–4, 6–9, 11–16), mastering (tracks 10 and 12), additional vocals on track 6, guitar
- John Benjamin "JB" Brubaker - guitar solo on track 1
- Dave Stephens - additional unclean vocals on track 3
- Patty Walters - additional vocals on track 9
- Christina Rotondo (Faultlines) - additional vocals on track 10
- Cody Carson - additional vocals on track 13
- Steve "Stevie T." Terreberry - guest guitar solo on track 13
- David "Dave Days" Joseph Colditz - additional vocals on track 15
- Michael "Mike" Martenson (Boys of Fall, Amidst the Grave's Demons) - unclean vocals on tracks 3, 6 and 14, chants on track 1
- Brittain Clay (Boys of Fall) - chants on track
- Walker Torbert - Bass
- Zed Rios - Rhythm Guitar on Track 4
- Luke Oxendale - mixing on track 5, mastering on track 5, production on track 16
- Sam Pura - mastering (1–4, 6–9, 11)
- Joey Sturgis - mastering (13–15)
- Dylan Werle - digital vocal editing (10–16)
- Ben Drake (Insomniac) - vocal tracking on track 10
- Zeke Tucker - album cover

== Chart performance ==
| Chart (2016) | Peak position |
|---|---|
| US Billboard Top Comedy Albums | 1 |
| US Billboard Top Heatseekers | 12 |
| US Billboard Independent Albums | 39 |
