= Space Zombies EP =

EP by Amidst the Grave's Demons
- Released: June 17, 2016
- Genre: Parody music; comedy rock; metalcore; post-hardcore
- Length: 18:05; 42:39 (bonus track edition)
- Label: Self-released
- Producer: Jarrod Alonge; Johnny Franck

Jarrod Alonge chronology
Friendville (2016)	Space Zombies EP (2016)	Covers, Vol. 1 (2017)

Singles from Space Zombies EP
- 1. "Uranus Infection" Released: June 10, 2016; 2. "These Borders Don't Trump" Released: October 26, 2016

Professional ratings
Review scores
Source	Rating
Kill Your Stereo	90/100
Rock Freaks	7/10

Space Zombies is the first EP by YouTube comedian Jarrod Alonge, released under the moniker of his fictitious metalcore band Amidst the Grave's Demons on June 17, 2016. The album's title is a reference to the Zombie and Space EPs by The Devil Wears Prada.

Unlike Alonge's previous albums that focused primarily on satirizing musical tropes, Space Zombies directly parodies the bands The Devil Wears Prada, A Day to Remember, Architects, and For Today. In addition to the band parodies, the EP also features an acoustic version of the song "The Swimmer" from Beating a Dead Horse, with the original song being a parody of the band Memphis May Fire.

== Track listing ==
All tracks are written by Jarrod Alonge.

No.	Title	Band parodied	Length
1.	"Uranus Infection"	The Devil Wears Prada	3:56
2.	"Rewind to 2007"	A Day to Remember	3:02
3.	"These Borders Don't Trump"	Architects	3:34
4.	"Write the Science"	For Today	4:06
5.	"The Swimmer" (acoustic)		3:27
Total length:			18:05

CD edition bonus tracks
No.	Title	Band parodied	Length
6.	"Suck My 401K" (feat. Chris Linck)	Attila	3:38
7.	"The Swimmer"	Memphis May Fire	3:52
8.	"Save My Life"	We Came As Romans	4:07
9.	"Misogyneric" (feat. Mattie Montgomery)		3:50
10.	"I'm So Scene 2.0" (feat. Johnny Franck)	Attack Attack!	4:42
11.	"Hey Jarrod, What's That Song Again?"		4:15
Total length:			42:39

== Personnel ==
Amidst the Grave's Demons

- Michael "Mike" Martenson – vocals
- Jarrod Alonge – songwriting, guitar

Additional personnel

- Jake Cemer – acoustic guitar
- Joey Sturgis – mastering
- Dylan Werle – vocal editing
- Brittain Clay – vocal editing
- Varrick Jay, Ben Drake, James Dotzler, Sam Fassler – gang vocals on "Suck My 401K"
- Chris Linck – guest guitar solo on "Suck My 401K"
- Mattie Montgomery – additional vocals on "Misogyneric"
- Johnny Franck – production, guitar, programming, clean vocals on "I'm So Scene 2.0"
- Sarah Schmidt – artwork
