= Jared Dines =

American musician & YouTuber (born 1989)

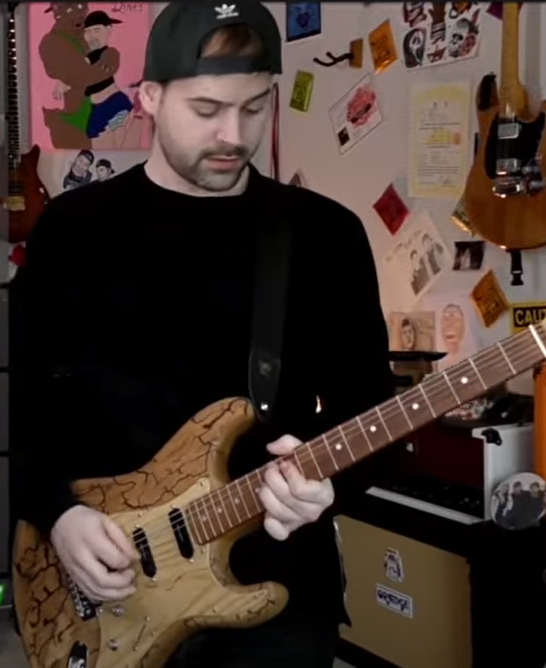
- Dines in 2020

Background information
- Born: October 6, 1989 (age 37); Seattle, Washington, U.S.
- Genres: Heavy metal; alternative metal; djent; metalcore
- Occupations: Musician; YouTuber; producer
- Instruments: Guitar; drums; bass; vocals
- Years active: 2010–present
- Member of: Daddy Rock; SION
- Formerly of: Dissimulator, Rest, Repose, Oni

YouTube information
- Channel: Jared Dines
- Genres: Vlog; music; comedy
- Subscribers: 2.96 million
- Views: 796 million
- Last updated: September 4, 2025

Jared Dines (born October 6, 1989) is an American YouTuber and musician who is known for metalcore-themed and adjacent videos, covers, parodies, and his own original music. He was a member of Canadian metalcore band Oni, and a frequent collaborator with musicians such as Howard Jones and Matt Heafy.

== Career ==
=== Youtube ===
Dines worked as a recording engineer before pursuing YouTube full time. He started his YouTube channel to promote his band, They Charge Like Warriors, in 2011.

His first major success on the platform came in 2014 when he published "10 Styles of Metal". Previously only averaging a few hundred views per video, "10 Styles of Metal" was picked up by local news outlets and highlighted by online music journalists. It would later garner millions of views. As a response, Dines began to produce more skit-based content. He gained further popularity from his metal covers of pop songs. His following grew as he collaborated with other artists such as Rob Scallon.

Dines, in competition with Steve Terreberry, became known for playing guitars with an unusual amount of strings. In 2017, he was scammed when trying to purchase a 17-string instrument from a fraud luthier. However, Dines was later gifted a custom 18-string guitar which he demoed at the 2018 NAMM Show. Terreberry responded with a 20-string guitar in 2019. At the conclusion of their feud, Terreberry and Dines participated in a charity auction of the instruments. The 18-string was purchased by Philip Kaplan after Dines' auction initially failed.

=== Musicianship ===
In 2015, Dines co-founded the band Rest, Repose with Ryan "Fluff" Bruce. He left the project in 2019 to focus on his group Daddy Rock. Dines was also a member of metalcore band Dissimulator.

In 2018, Dines toured with heavy metal band Trivium. He partly replaced front man Matt Heafy, who had to leave the tour prematurely due to his wife being close to giving birth. Dines and Trivium further collaborated on a cover of "Better Now" by Post Malone. In October 2019, he performed on stage with Breaking Benjamin.

In April 2020, Dines appeared on the cover of Guitar World magazine, the first YouTuber to do so. In 2020, Music Man released his signature Stingray guitar. On December 4, 2020, he released a collaborative EP with Trivium vocalist and guitarist Matt Heafy under the name Dines X Heafy. The video for "Dear Anxiety", which is the first track, was released on the same day to coincide with the release of Dines X Heafy.

In March 2021, Dines joined with metal vocalist Howard Jones and producer Hiram Hernandez to release "The Blade" as part of a new project named Sion. Their self-titled debut album was released on November 26, 2021. Their first album was released that November. As of 2024, they were working on their sophomore album.

Dines was a touring member of metalcore band Oni. In 2024, he joined the band as a permanent member until 2025.

== Discography ==
=== Solo work ===
List adapted from Spotify.

Studio albums
Title	Album details
The Djent Files	Released: January 16, 2021; Label: Self-released; Format: Digital download, streaming
The Grey	Scheduled: November 18, 2022; Label: Self-released; Format: Digital download, streaming

Extended plays
Title	Album details
The Dark	Released: September 23, 2016; Label: Self-released; Format: Digital download, streaming
The Light	Released: November 20, 2016; Label: Self-released; Format: Digital download, streaming
Shred Feast	Released: July 14, 2020; Label: Self-released; Format: Digital download, streaming

=== Collaborations ===
with Daddy Rock
Title	Album details	Ref.
Daddy Rock	Released: September 4, 2018; Label: Self-released; Format: Digital download, streaming	
Daddy Rock 2	Released: October 17, 2019; Label: Self-released; Format: Digital download, streaming	

with Dines X Heafy
Title	Album details	Ref.
Dines X Heafy (Jared Dines and Matt Heafy)	Released: December 4, 2020; Label: Roadrunner; Format: Digital download, streaming	

with Keillen Allith
Title	Album details	Ref.
Colors of Grimmx EP (Jared Dines and Austin Dickey)	Released: June 2017; Label: Self-released; Format: Digital download, streaming	

with Rest, Repose
Title	Album details	Ref.
Sleep City EP	Released: December 15, 2015; Label: Self-released; Format: Digital download, streaming	
Rest, Repose	Released: May 19, 2017; Label: Self-released; Format: Digital download, streaming	

with SION
Title	Album details	Ref.
SION (Jared Dines and Howard Jones)	Released: November 26, 2021; Label: Self-released; Format: Digital download, streaming	

=== Guest appearances ===
- Leo
  - Redemption Song (Metal Cover) (2016)
    - Redemption Song (Metal Cover)
  - Californication (Metal Version) (2017)
    - Californication (Metal Version) (feat. Jared Dines, Rabea Massaad, Rob Scallon, Garrett Peters, Eric Caderone, Robert Baker)
- Navigator
  - Ironclad (2017)
    - Sentinel (feat. Jared Dines & Justin Hockaday)
- Shrezzers
  - Relationships (2019)
    - E.M.O.J.I.Q.U.E.E.N. (feat. Jared Dines & TWild)
- Charlie Parra del Riego
  - Chaos and Redemption (2019)
    - Moonsault (feat. Jared Dines & Lucas Moscardini)
  - B Sides II (2021)
    - Charlie Parra VS Jared Dines
- Ignoration
  - Rap Metal Verse (2020)
    - Rap Metal Verse
- Vermicide Violence
  - The Praxis of Prophylaxis (2020)
    - Coronaviscerated
- CrazyEightyEight
  - Killing In the Name (2020)
    - Killing in the Name (feat. Marcus Bridge, Courtney LaPlante, Tyler Tate, Jared Dines, Michael Martenson, Nathan Kane, Linzey Rae, Jake Impellizzeri, David Thompson)
- Jonathan Young
  - Young's Old Covers (2013-2016) (2021)
    - Never Gonna Give You Up
- 66samus
  - Hulk Smash METAL (2022)
    - Hulk Smash Metal (feat. Jared Dines & Ola Englund)
- The Gentle Men
  - The Gentle Men (2023)
    - Opinions Are Weapons (feat. Jared Dines)

== See also ==
- List of YouTubers
