= Jarrod Alonge =

American comedian and musician

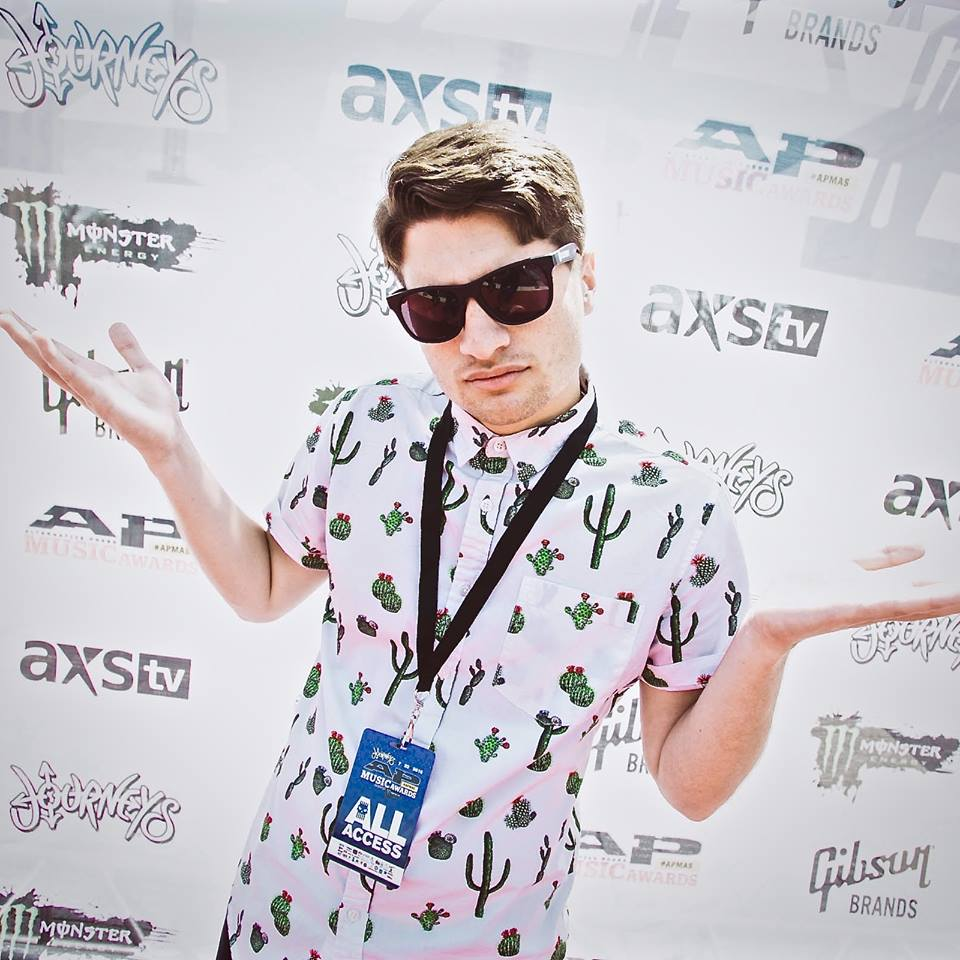
- Jarrod Alonge at the 2015 APMAs
- Born: Jarrod Michael Alonge; March 25, 1993 (age 33); Orlando, Florida, U.S.

Comedy career
- Years active: 2009–present
- Genres: Sketch comedy; musical comedy; satire; deadpan comedy; self-deprecation; cringe comedy
- Musical career
- Genres: Pop punk; comedy rock; parody; metalcore; hardcore punk; post-hardcore; easycore; emo; math rock; deathcore; progressive metal; crunkcore
- Instruments: Guitar; vocals; programming
- Website: boketo.media/about

Jarrod Michael Alonge (born March 25, 1993) is an American comedian, songwriter and media producer. He is best known for his parodies of the artists, sub-genres and stereotypes within alternative music. His three independent full-length comedy albums Beating a Dead Horse, Friendville and Awkward & Depressed all reached number one on the Billboard Top Comedy Albums chart. Alonge is the owner and founder of Boketo Media, a digital media and production company which launched in March 2019. He is also the lead songwriter and guitarist of post-hardcore supergroup CrazyEightyEight.

== Personal life ==
Alonge studied biology at Tennessee Technological University and graduated with a BS degree in 2014, having originally planned to attend medical school. He currently lives in Chattanooga, Tennessee with his wife Rachel and two daughters.

== Discography ==
=== Studio albums ===
Year	Title	Artist
2015	Beating a Dead Horse	Various
2016	Friendville	Sunrise Skater Kids
2017	Awkward & Depressed	Canadian Softball
2018	Burning Alive	CrazyEightyEight
2020	The Praxis of Prophylaxis	Vermicide Violence
2023	Emotaku	Sunrise Skater Kids
2025	Milking a Dead Cow	Various
2026	Friendworld	Sunrise Skater Kids

=== Singles and EPs ===
Year	Title	Artist
2013	I'm So Scene	Amidst the Grave's Demons
2014	Eternity (Literally)	Amidst the Grave's Demons
2014	Pop Punk Pizza Party	Sunrise Skater Kids
2015	12 Days of a Pop Punk Christmas	Sunrise Skater Kids
2016	Space Zombies EP	Amidst the Grave's Demons
2016	Pubic Apology	SwagChode
2017	How Far I'll Go	Sunrise Skater Kids
2017	Covers, Vol. 1	CrazyEightyEight
2017	No Words Spoken	CrazyEightyEight
2017	Covers, Vol. 2	CrazyEightyEight
2018	Shinebox	CrazyEightyEight
2018	To Plant a Seed	CrazyEightyEight
2018	Merry Splitmas	Various
2020	COSPLIT-19	Various
2020	Killing In the Name	CrazyEightyEight
2021	Still Posi	Sunrise Skater Kids
2021	What's My Age Again?	Sunrise Skater Kids
2021	Liberté, Egalité, Friendvillé	Sunrise Skater Kids
2021	Homeless Millennial	Sunrise Skater Kids
2021	... and yet, I fish	Canadian Softball
2021	The Christmas Shoes	Canadian Softball
2022	Boybandin' Up	Sunrise Skater Kids
2023	Hate the Swim, Love the Swimmer	Amidst the Grave's Demons

=== Music videos ===
Title	From the album
"The Swimmer"	Beating a Dead Horse
"Save My Life"	Beating a Dead Horse
"Inconceivable Somatic Defecation"	Beating a Dead Horse
"Unbreakable"	Beating a Dead Horse
"First World Tragedy"	Beating a Dead Horse
"Pit Warrior"	Friendville
"Rylo Ken"	Friendville
"Friendville"	Friendville
"These Borders Don't Trump"	Space Zombies EP
"Fund Me"	Awkward & Depressed
"Tommy's Planet"	No Words Spoken
"Your Validation"	Awkward & Depressed
"Great Again"	Awkward & Depressed
"Shinebox"	Burning Alive
"Nitroglycerin"	Burning Alive
"Tears in Rain"	Burning Alive
"Bastard from a Basket"	Burning Alive
"I Am Tetsuo"	Burning Alive
"Fortune and Glory, Kid"	Burning Alive
"Coronaviscerated"	The Praxis of Prophylaxis

== Awards and nominations ==
Year	Nominee / work	Award	Result
2014	Jarrod Alonge	Kerrang! Awards – Best Comedian	Won
