= Attack Attack! discography =

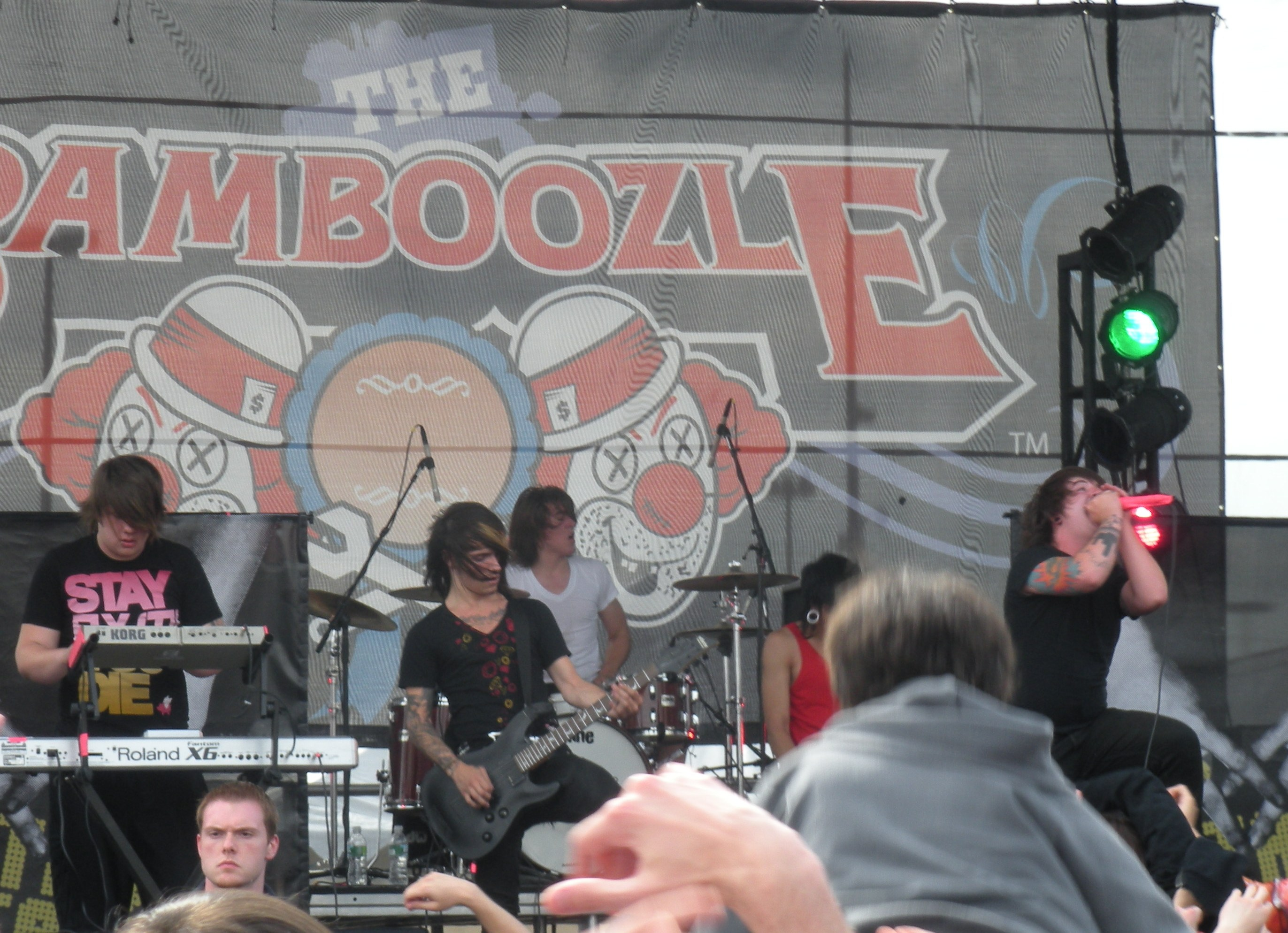
- Attack Attack! performing at 2009 Bamboozle festival.
- Studio albums: 4
- EPs: 4
- Singles: 25
- Music videos: 14

The discography of the American metalcore/electronicore band Attack Attack!, consists of four studio albums, four extended plays, twenty-three singles and fifteen music videos. The band went through numerous line-up changes and broke up in 2013, only to reunite in 2020.

== Albums ==
=== Studio albums ===
List of studio albums, with selected chart positions and sales figures
Title	Album details	Peak chart positions							Sales
Title	Album details	US	US Alt.	US Hard Rock	US Heat	US Indie	US Rock	CAN	Sales
Someday Came Suddenly	Released: November 11, 2008; Label: Rise; Formats: CD, LP, digital download	193	—	—	9	25	—	—	US: 3,600
Attack Attack!	Released: June 8, 2010; Label: Rise; Formats: CD, LP, digital download	27	5	—	—	1	6	—	US: 15,000
This Means War	Released: January 17, 2012; Label: Rise; Formats: CD, LP, digital download	11	4	2	—	2	4	120	US: 17,000
Attack Attack! II	Released: August 8, 2025; Label: Oxide; Formats: CD, LP, digital download	—	—	—	—	—	—	—	
"—" denotes a recording that did not chart or was not released in that territory.

== Extended plays ==
List of extended plays
Title	Details
If Guns Are Outlawed, Can We Use Swords?	Released: Early 2008; Label: Self-released; Formats: CD, Digital download
Long Time, No Sea	Released: October 29, 2021; Label: Oxide Records; Format: LP, digital download, streaming
Dark Waves	Released: March 31, 2023; Label: Oxide Records; Format: CD, LP, Digital download, streaming
Disaster	Released: September 20, 2024; Label: Oxide Records; Format: Digital download, streaming

== Singles ==
=== As lead artist ===
List of singles as lead artist, showing year released and album name
Title	Year	Album
"Stick Stickly"	2008	Someday Came Suddenly
"Dr. Shavargo Pt. 3"	2009	Someday Came Suddenly
"Sexual Man Chocolate"	2010	Attack Attack!
"Smokahontas"	2010	Attack Attack!
"Last Breath"	2011	Attack Attack!
"The Motivation"	2011	This Means War
"The Wretched"	2012	This Means War
"The Revolution"	2012	This Means War
"No Defeat"	2012	Non-album single
"All My Life"	2020	Long Time, No Sea
"Kawaii Cowboys"	2021	Long Time, No Sea
"Brachyura Bombshell"	2021	Long Time, No Sea
"Fade With Me"	2021	Long Time, No Sea
"Press F"	2021	Long Time, No Sea
"Dark Waves"	2023	Dark Waves
"Paralyzed (Until We Meet Again)"	2023	Dark Waves
"Out of Time"	2023	Dark Waves
"Concrete"	2024	Disaster
"Disaster"	2024	Disaster
"Blood On the Walls"	2024	Disaster
"We All Meet Up In the End"	2024	Disaster
"Dance!"	2025	Attack Attack! II
"Chainless"	2025	Attack Attack! II
"One Hit Wonder"	2025	Attack Attack! II
"I Complain On R/Metalcore"	2025	Attack Attack! II

=== As featured artist ===
List of singles, with selected chart positions and certifications, showing year released and album name
Title	Year	Peak chart positions
Title	Year	US Main.
"Paralyzed" (with Conquer Divide)	2024	40

== Guest appearances ==
List of guest appearances, showing year released and album name
Title	Year	Album
"I Kissed a Girl"	2009	Punk Goes Pop Volume Two

== Music videos ==
List of music videos, showing year released and director
Title	Year	Director(s)	Ref.
"Stick Stickly" (two versions exist)	2009	Unknown	
"Dr. Shavargo Pt. 3"	2009	Unknown	
"Smokahontas"	2011	Thunder Down Country	
"Last Breath"	2011	Joey Creel	
"The Wretched"	2012	Megan Thompson	
"The Motivation"	2012	Unknown	
"The Revolution"	2012	Unknown	
"All My Life"	2020	Unknown	
"Brachyura Bombshell"	2021	Unknown	
"Press F"	2021	Vince Lundi	
"Concrete"	2024	Unknown	
"Disaster"	2024	Unknown	
"Blood on the Walls"	2024	Unknown	
"We All Meet Up In The End"	2024	Unknown	
"Spitfire"	2024	Unknown	
