= List of 2018 box office number-one films in Taipei =

This is a list of films which have reached number one at the weekend box office in Taipei, Taiwan during 2018.

== Films ==
†	This implies the highest-grossing movie of the year.

Week	Weekend end date	Film	Weekend gross (in 10,000 New Taiwan Dollar)	Cumulative box office (in 10,000 New Taiwan Dollar)	Openings in the Top 10
1	January 7, 2018	Along with the Gods: The Two Worlds	$2,496	$8,392	Insidious: The Last Key (#4); On Happiness Road (#6); Darkest Hour (#7)
2	January 14, 2018	Along with the Gods: The Two Worlds	$1,778	$11,610	The Commuter (#2); Call Me by Your Name (#7); 1987: When the Day Comes (#10)
3	January 21, 2018	Maze Runner: The Death Cure	$2,199	$2,199	12 Strong (#3); The Disaster Artist (#6); Fate/Stay Night: Heaven's Feel - I. Presage Flower (#7); Namiya (#10)
4	January 28, 2018	Maze Runner: The Death Cure	$975	$4,164	Downsizing (#3); Net I Die (#6)
5	February 4, 2018	Molly's Game	$456	$462	Winchester (#4); All the Money in the World (#5); The Shape of Water (#7)
6	February 11, 2018	Fifty Shades Freed	$643	$798	Back to the Good Times (#2); The 15:17 to Paris (#5); Three Billboards Outside Ebbing, Missouri (#10)
7	February 18, 2018	Black Panther	$2,925	$5,163	Gatao 2 - The New Leader Rising (#2); Ferdinand (#4); The Monkey King 3 (#9)
8	February 25, 2018	Black Panther	$1,606	$9,416	The Post (#2)
9	March 4, 2018	Red Sparrow	$1,650	$2,758	Girls 2 (#3); Lady Bird (#7); Destiny: The Tale of Kamakura (#8)
10	March 11, 2018	Tomb Raider	$1,628	$1,940	The Hurricane Heist (#3)
11	March 18, 2018	Tomb Raider	$908	$3,514	Den of Thieves (#3); Hindi Medium (#6)
12	March 25, 2018	Pacific Rim Uprising	$2,168	$3,001	Unsane (#5); Soul Mate (#7); Please Stand By (#10)
13	April 1, 2018	Ready Player One	$2,214	$2,595	Mazinger Z: Infinity (#5); About Youth (#6); Gringo (#7)
14	April 8, 2018	Ready Player One	$2,865	$8,371	A Quiet Place (#2); Peter Rabbit (#4); Be with You (#5); Entebbe (#6); Sherlock Gnomes (#8)
15	April 15, 2018	Rampage	$1,419	$1,670	Taxi 5 (#4); Omotenashi (#7); Midnight Sun (#9)
16	April 22, 2018	Ready Player One	$837	$12,112	Blockers (#3); Gonjiam: Haunted Asylum (#5); The Mercy (#10)
17	April 29, 2018	Avengers: Infinity War †	$6,012	$8,904	Love, Simon (#6); The Scythian Lamb (#8)
18	May 6, 2018	Avengers: Infinity War †	$3,041	$15,819	Anon (#4); The Trough (#5); Terminal (#8); Bungo Stray Dogs: Dead Apple (#10)
19	May 13, 2018	Avengers: Infinity War †	$1,380	$18,371	Truth or Dare (#2); Tully (#3); Color Me True (#6); Let's Cheat Together (#7)
20	May 20, 2018	Deadpool 2	$3,384	$5,479	C'est la vie! (#9)
21	May 27, 2018	Deadpool 2	$1,391	$7,774	Solo: A Star Wars Story (#2); Beirut (#4); I Feel Pretty (#6); The Crimes That Bind (#7)
22	June 3, 2018	Deadpool 2	$629	$9,194	Death Wish (#2); Isle of Dogs (#5); Code Geass (#10)
23	June 10, 2018	Jurassic World: Fallen Kingdom	$5,554	$7,610	Maborosi (#10)
24	June 17, 2018	Jurassic World: Fallen Kingdom	$3,114	$12,863	Ocean's 8 (#2); Champion (#3); Hereditary (#4); Long Time No Sea (#6)
25	June 24, 2018	Jurassic World: Fallen Kingdom	$1,230	$15,633	Tag (#3); The Extraordinary Journey of the Fakir (#6); Laplace's Witch (#7)
26	July 1, 2018	Incredibles 2	$2,462	$3,287	Escape Plan 2: Hades (#4); Doraemon the Movie: Nobita's Treasure Island (#7); Code Geass: Lelouch of the Rebellion Episode III (#10)
27	July 8, 2018	Ant-Man and the Wasp	$2,935	$4,288	Detective Conan: The Zero Executor (#3)
28	July 15, 2018	Skyscraper	$1,429	$1,761	Shoplifters (#6); Book Club (#9); Ryuichi Sakamoto: Coda (#10)
29	July 22, 2018	Skyscraper	$1,004	$3,648	Hotel Transylvania 3: Summer Vacation (#3); Brother of the Year (#6); Beyond the Edge (#9)
30	July 29, 2018	Mission: Impossible – Fallout	$3,803	$5,254	
31	August 5, 2018	Mission: Impossible – Fallout	$2,536	$9,750	Mamma Mia! Here We Go Again (#2); Christopher Robin (#3); Sicario: Day of the Soldado (#8)
32	August 12, 2018	Along with the Gods: The Last 49 Days	$3,736	$5,892	The Meg (#2); Crayon Shinchan the Movie: Bakumori! Kung Fu Boys - Ramen Panic (#9)
33	August 19, 2018	Along with the Gods: The Last 49 Days	$2,361	$10,439	The Outsiders (#4); Mirai (#5); The Spy Who Dumped Me (#6); Mile 22 (#7); When I Get Home, My Wife Always Pretends to be Dead (#8)
34	August 26, 2018	Along with the Gods: The Last 49 Days	$1,076	$12,582	Crazy Rich Asians (#2); Big Brother (#3); The First Purge (#6); The Darkest Minds (#7); Just a Breath Away (#9)
35	September 2, 2018	The Equalizer 2	$911	$1,120	High Flash (#7)
36	September 9, 2018	The Nun	$1,422	$1,848	Destination Wedding (#5); Hidden Treasures in the Mountain (#8); The Spy Gone North (#10)
37	September 16, 2018	The Predator	$656	$656	A Simple Favor (#3); The Witness (#7); Uncle Drew (#9)
38	September 23, 2018	Johnny English Strikes Again	$539	$539	Papillon (#2); Peppermint (#5); Code Blue the Movie (#9); One Cut of the Dead (#10)
39	September 30, 2018	One Cut of the Dead	$555	$948	Smallfoot (#4); Searching (#5); The Children Act (#10)
40	October 7, 2018	Venom	$2,852	$4,125	Project Gutenberg (#3); Café Funiculi Funicula (#4)
41	October 14, 2018	Venom	$1,194	$7,012	A Star Is Born (#2); The House with a Clock in Its Walls (#4)
42	October 21, 2018	A Star Is Born	$1,074	$3,357	Halloween (#3); Goosebumps 2: Haunted Halloween (#5); The Negotiation (#6); Billionaire Boys Club (#7); Killing for the Prosecution (#8)
43	October 28, 2018	A Star Is Born	$742	$4,702	Hunter Killer (#2); First Man (#3); Rampant (#6); The Scoundrels (#8); Single Day (#9)
44	November 4, 2018	Hunter Killer	$511	$1,328	Dear Ex (#3); Bohemian Rhapsody (#4); Life Itself (#7); Saint Young Men (#8)
45	November 11, 2018	Dear Ex	$452	$1,180	Overlord (#2); The Grinch (#6); The Girl in the Spider's Web (#7)
46	November 18, 2018	Fantastic Beasts: The Crimes of Grindelwald	$3,309	$4,005	Burn the Stage: The Movie (#8); How to Train Our Dragon (#10)
47	November 25, 2018	Fantastic Beasts: The Crimes of Grindelwald	$1,517	$6,818	The Devil Fish (#2); Skjelvet (#4); Bad Times at the El Royale (#10)
48	December 2, 2018	Ralph Breaks the Internet	$1,589	$1,805	More than Blue (#2); Creed II (#5); Unstoppable (#7)
49	December 9, 2018	More than Blue	$1,423	$3,510	Mortal Engines (#3); Widows (#5); Pokémon the Movie: The Power of Us (#6); Spider-Man: Into the Spider-Verse (#8); Default (#9)
50	December 16, 2018	Aquaman	$3,533	$4,868	Farewell My Concubine (#6); My Hero Academia: Two Heroes (#8); Late Life: The Chien-Ming Wang Story (#10)
51	December 23, 2018	Aquaman	$2,231	$8,786	Robin Hood (#2); Ben Is Back (#8); Shadow (#9)
52	December 30, 2018	Bumblebee	$1,381	$1,896	Take Point (#3); Master Z: The Ip Man Legacy (#4); The Nutcracker and the Four Realms (#5)

== See also ==
- 2018 Taiwanese films
- List of highest-grossing films in Taiwan
