= Chien-Ming Wang =

Taiwanese baseball player (born 1980)

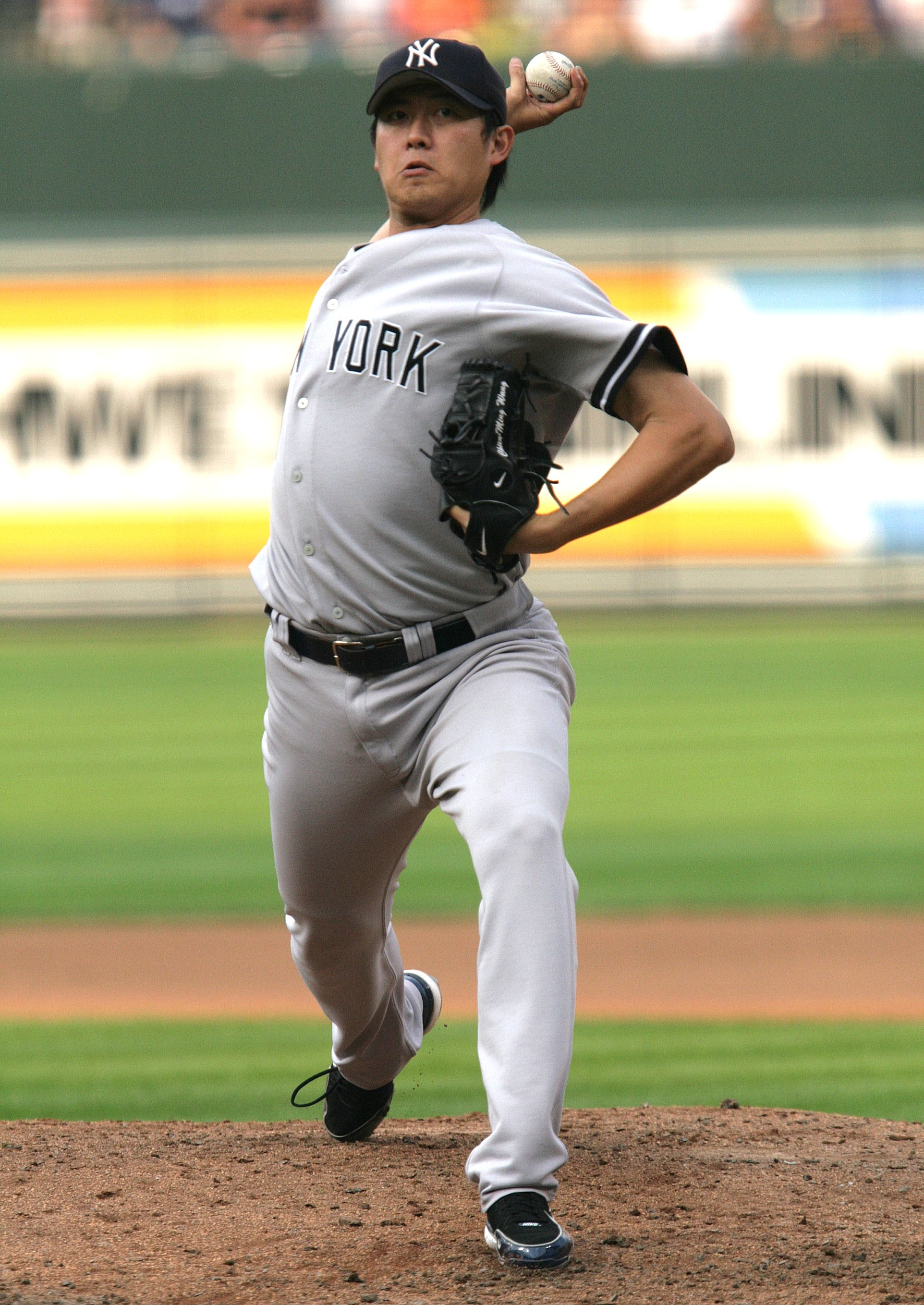
- Wang pitching for the New York Yankees in 2006

CTBC Brothers – No. 40
- Pitcher / Coach
- Born: March 31, 1980 (age 46); Guanmiao, Tainan, Taiwan
- Batted: Right Threw: Right

MLB debut
- April 30, 2005, for the New York Yankees

Last MLB appearance
- August 30, 2016, for the Kansas City Royals

MLB statistics
- Win–loss record: 68–34
- Earned run average: 4.36
- Strikeouts: 394
- Stats at Baseball Reference

Teams
- As player: New York Yankees (2005–2009); Washington Nationals (2011–2012); Toronto Blue Jays (2013); Kansas City Royals (2016); As coach: Fubon Guardians (2019); CTBC Brothers (2020–present)

Career highlights and awards
- AL wins leader (2006)
Medals
Representing Chinese Taipei
Men's baseball
Asian Games
Silver medal – second place	2002 Busan	Taiwan

Chien-Ming Wang
- Chinese: 王建民
Transcriptions
Standard Mandarin
- Hanyu Pinyin: Wáng Jiànmín
- Wade–Giles: Wang^{2} Chien^{4}-Min^{2}
- IPA: [wǎŋ tɕjɛ̂nmǐn]
Yue: Cantonese
- Yale Romanization: Wòhng Gin-màhn
- Jyutping: Wong4 Gin3-man4
- IPA: [wɔ̏ːŋ kɪ̄nmɐ̏n]
Southern Min
- Hokkien POJ: Ông Kiàn-bîn

Chien-Ming Wang (Chinese: 王建民; pinyin: Wáng Jiànmín; born March 31, 1980) is a Taiwanese former professional baseball pitcher. He played in Major League Baseball (MLB) for the New York Yankees, Washington Nationals, Toronto Blue Jays, and Kansas City Royals. He also played for the Chinese Taipei national baseball team, and is the current assistant pitching coach for CTBC Brothers.

Wang signed as an amateur free agent with the Yankees in 2000. After working his way up the Yankees' minor league system for several seasons, he made his MLB debut in 2005. With his hard sinker, he was one of the best starting pitchers for the Yankees in 2006 and 2007, winning 19 games in both seasons and leading the American League in that category in 2006. He suffered a foot injury in 2008 that limited his appearances and effectiveness, and a series of arm injuries cost him most of the 2009 season and all of 2010. Wang returned to major leagues with the Washington Nationals in 2011, starting 21 games over two seasons while again spending time on the disabled list. He signed with the Yankees in 2013 but was released without pitching in the major leagues, then signed with the Toronto Blue Jays and made six starts with limited effectiveness. He pitched for minor league teams in several organizations in 2014 and 2015. In 2016, he returned to the major leagues as a relief pitcher with the Kansas City Royals.

Wang was the third major leaguer from Taiwan, following Dodgers outfielder Chin-Feng Chen, and Rockies pitcher Chin-Hui Tsao.

== Minor league career ==
Wang rose through the New York Yankees' minor league system, including the Single-A Staten Island Yankees, who retired his #41 in 2006. Wang posted a 1.75 ERA for Staten Island, second-lowest in franchise history. He played for the World Team in the All-Star Futures Game in 2003. In 2005, Wang was called up from the Yankees' Triple-A affiliate, the Columbus Clippers. In 2013, Wang came back to the Yankees' Triple-A affiliate, the Scranton/Wilkes-Barre RailRiders.

== Major league career ==
=== New York Yankees ===
==== 2005–2007 ====
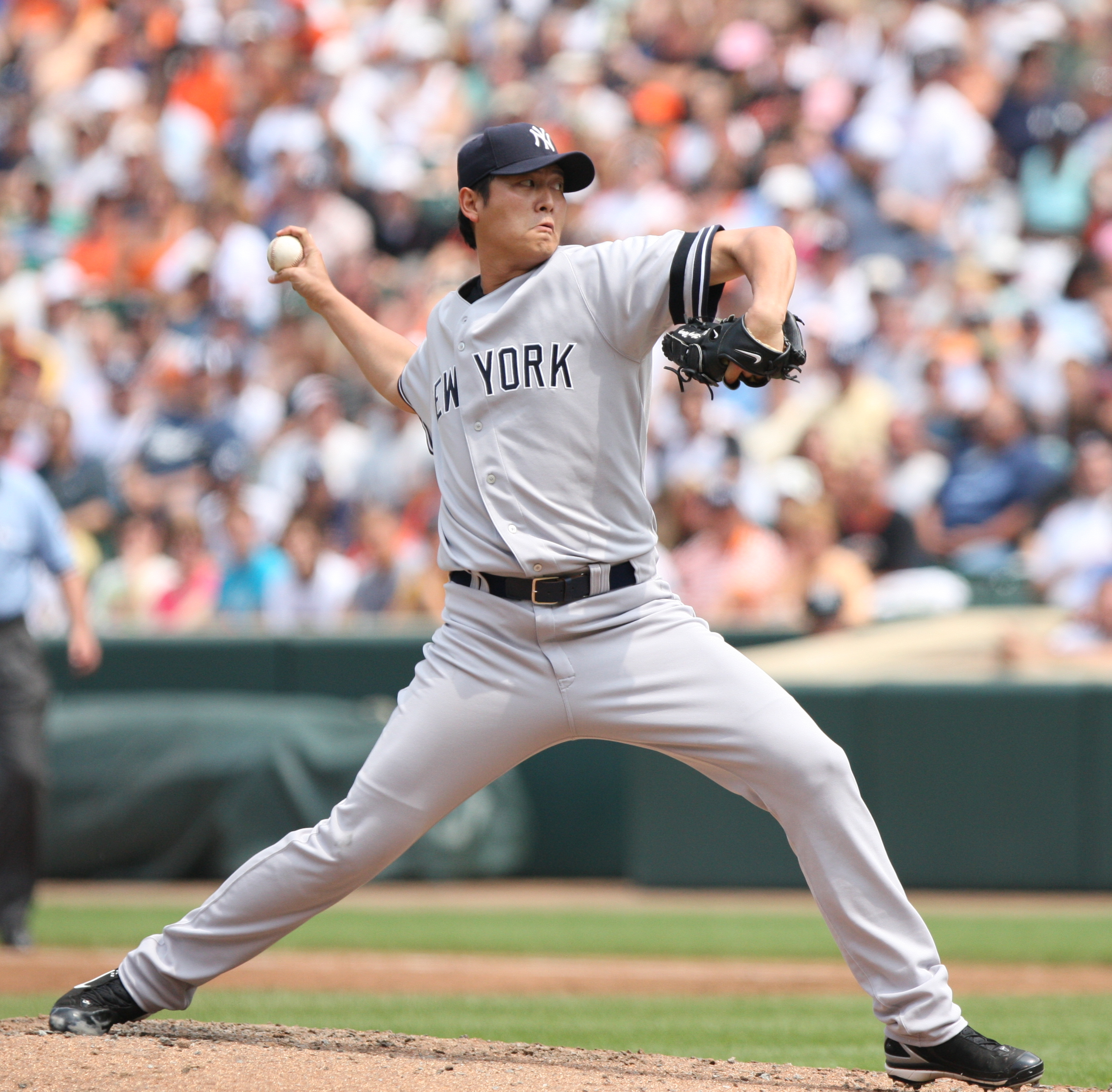
Wang pitching for the New York Yankees in 2007

Wang made his MLB debut on April 30, 2005, against the Toronto Blue Jays, pitching seven strong innings while allowing only two earned runs. He earned a no-decision in the Yankees' 4–3 win. Wang pitched in 18 games, though an injury kept him sidelined for part of the season. He went 8–5 with an earned run average of 4.02. On September 19, 2005, Wang tied a record for assists in a game by a pitcher with nine. In the playoffs against the Angels, Wang pitched 6 2/3 innings and allowed four runs, only one of which was earned. The Yankees lost the game and the series.

In 2006, Wang won 19 games (tied for the most in the majors along with Johan Santana) and posted a 3.63 ERA in 218 innings across 34 games (33 starts). He picked up his first save on June 3 against the Baltimore Orioles in his only non-starting appearance. Wang also threw two complete games, though the first, on June 18, was bittersweet: against the Washington Nationals, he allowed a one-out, two-run, walk-off home run by Ryan Zimmerman to lose the game 3–2. His first complete-game win was on July 28, 2006, a two-hit, 6–0 shutout of the Tampa Bay Devil Rays at Yankee Stadium. In his next start, he threw eight shutout innings against the Toronto Blue Jays, in which he got an outstanding 16 ground ball outs. Wang was particularly strong in the second half of the season, winning 10 of his 14 starts and posting a 3.13 ERA in 92 innings. He was selected to start the first game of the Division Series against the Detroit Tigers, earning the win as the Yankees beat Detroit 8–4.

Overall in 2006, Wang limited batters to a .211 batting average while games were tied, and a .205 batting average in games that were late and close. The Tampa Bay Devil Rays batted just .159 against him, losing three out of four games to the Yankees that Wang pitched. Wang was effective despite the lowest strikeout rate in the majors (3.14 strikeouts per nine innings and 76 strikeouts overall), thanks in part to his allowing the fewest home runs per nine innings (0.5; he allowed just 12 home runs overall). Wang also led the league in ground ball percentage (62.8%) and obtained 2.84 groundouts for every fly ball out.

At the end of the season, Wang finished second to Johan Santana in voting for the Cy Young Award. Wang collected 15 second-place votes, and 51 points. He also received a ninth-place vote, good for two points, in the AL MVP balloting, won by Justin Morneau. In MLB.com's This Year in Baseball Awards, he was chosen as the top starter in 2006 season with more than 47% of the fan vote.

Wang began the 2007 season on the disabled list, having injured his right hamstring during spring training. He returned on April 24 against Tampa Bay. On May 5, 2007, Wang pitched 7 1/3 perfect innings before giving up a home run to Ben Broussard of the Seattle Mariners, falling five outs short of a perfect game.

On June 17, 2007, Wang had a superb outing versus the New York Mets, in which he threw 113 pitches through 8 and 2/3 innings, notched 10 strikeouts (a career high) and gave up just two runs on six hits. On August 30, Wang took a no-hitter against the Boston Red Sox into the seventh inning before giving up a single to Mike Lowell. Rookies Joba Chamberlain and Edwar Ramírez finished the two-hitter, and the Yankees beat the Red Sox 5–0.

In 2007, Wang was second in the AL in wins (19), third for the second straight year in win–loss percentage (.731), ninth in wild pitches (9), and 10th in hit batsmen (8). He had a perfect 1.000 fielding percentage. He also had the lowest HR/9 innings pitched ratio in the AL (0.41; in 199 1/3 innings he allowed just nine home runs), was third in GB% (58.5%) and GB/FB (2.51), and had the fifth-lowest strikeouts per 9 innings pitched (4.70, and 104 strikeouts overall).

Despite his regular season performance, Wang faltered in the 2007 postseason. In the American League Division Series against the Cleveland Indians, Wang started two games, earning the loss in both appearances. He pitched a combined 5 and 2/3 innings, giving up 12 earned runs, for a postseason ERA of 19.06. The Yankees lost the ALDS in four games.

==== 2008–2009 ====
The beginning of the 2008 season saw Wang at the top of the Yankees rotation and the ace with veterans Mike Mussina and Andy Pettitte. In the final Yankee Stadium season opener against the Toronto Blue Jays, Wang pitched 7.0 innings, allowing only two runs and picking up his first win of the season. In his first start against the Boston Red Sox in 2008, he pitched a one-run, two-hit complete game.

On April 22, 2008, Wang recorded a win against the Chicago White Sox at U.S. Cellular Field. The victory, in Wang's 85th career start, made him the fastest Major Leaguer to record 50 wins as a starter since Dwight Gooden, who won his 50th game in his 82nd start on June 29, 1986, at Chicago for the New York Mets. Wang also became the quickest Yankee to 50 wins since Ron Guidry, who accomplished this in his 82nd start.

Wang finished April with a perfect 5–0 record, leading the American League along with Joe Saunders. On May 2, Wang became the first six-game winner in the American League with a win over the Seattle Mariners with just one earned run over six innings. On May 8, Cliff Lee of the Cleveland Indians beat Wang 3–0, handing Wang his first loss of the season. During this loss, Wang allowed three runs and five hits in seven innings. On June 10, after going six starts with two losses and four no decisions since May 2, Wang defeated the Oakland Athletics 3–1 to end the longest victory drought of his career. Through 2008, Wang had the third highest winning percentage of all starting pitchers over the last three years (46–15, .754).

On June 15, Wang was taken out of an interleague game versus the Houston Astros due to a right foot injury he sustained while running the bases, something he was not used to doing, since pitchers do not bat in the American League. Wang was diagnosed with a torn Lisfranc ligament of the right foot and a partial tear of the peroneus longus of the right foot. Despite not requiring surgery, he was on crutches and wearing a protective boot. The cast was removed on July 29, but the extensive rehabilitation process prevented Wang from pitching for the remainder of the season. Yankees' part-owner Hank Steinbrenner showed frustration with pitchers having to bat in the National League and suggested that the League "join the modern age". On December 22, 2008, Wang and the New York Yankees avoided salary arbitration when they agreed to a $5 million, one-year contract. Wang made $4 million in the 2008 season after losing in salary arbitration. He had asked for $4.6 million.

On April 3, 2009, Wang became the first Yankees' starting and the first game winning pitcher of the new Yankee Stadium in the stadium opener exhibition game against Chicago Cubs. His regular season began with an extraordinarily bad performance. In his first start of the regular season, Wang gave up seven earned runs and nine hits in 3.2 innings against the Baltimore Orioles. That was followed by a one-inning appearance against the Tampa Bay Rays when he surrendered eight earned runs in just one inning. In his third start, against the Cleveland Indians in New York on April 18, Wang was credited for eight more earned runs in 1.1 innings; Cleveland won the game 22–4. After his first three appearances, Wang was 0–3 with a whopping 34.50 ERA.

There was speculation that the right foot injury Wang sustained during the 2008 season caused him to compensate with the rest of his pitching motion, leading to his 2009 struggles. Following the April 18 game manager Joe Girardi said, "We have some time. We have a day off, I think Thursday, and we're going to have to decide what's best for Chien-Ming Wang and the team." On April 22, General Manager Brian Cashman, at a Q&A at Southern Connecticut State University, confirmed Wang's release point was five inches higher than the same time the previous season.

After being removed from the rotation and sent down to Tampa to work out mechanical issues, Wang was diagnosed with weakness in the muscles of both hips and placed on the disabled list. He was activated from the disabled list on May 22, 2009, and on his first day on the active roster, he was brought in from the bullpen. After two more relief appearances, Wang went back to the rotation, but he struggled once again in his first and second starts back. On June 28, Wang earned his first win of the season, also his first since June 15, 2008, giving up two runs over 5.1 innings against the New York Mets.

Wang was placed on the disabled list on July 15, 2009, due to shoulder soreness. He was then eliminated for the remainder of the season after undergoing shoulder surgery on July 30, 2009. After the Yankees won the 2009 World Series against the Philadelphia Phillies, Wang participated in the championship parade through the Canyon of Heroes, but acknowledged it "would have been more fun" if he had been healthy. On December 12, 2009, the Yankees made the choice not to re-sign him, making him a free agent.

Taiwan fans followed Wang's tenure at the Yankees closely. Due to the domestic excitement about Wang, every Yankees game was shown live on television in Taiwan, often on two networks, and rebroadcast at least once later in the day. This led to the frequent joke that the Yankees were the Republic of China's national team. After the Yankees did not re-sign Wang in 2009, the team's reputation among the public on Taiwan declined.

=== Washington Nationals ===
==== 2010–2012 ====
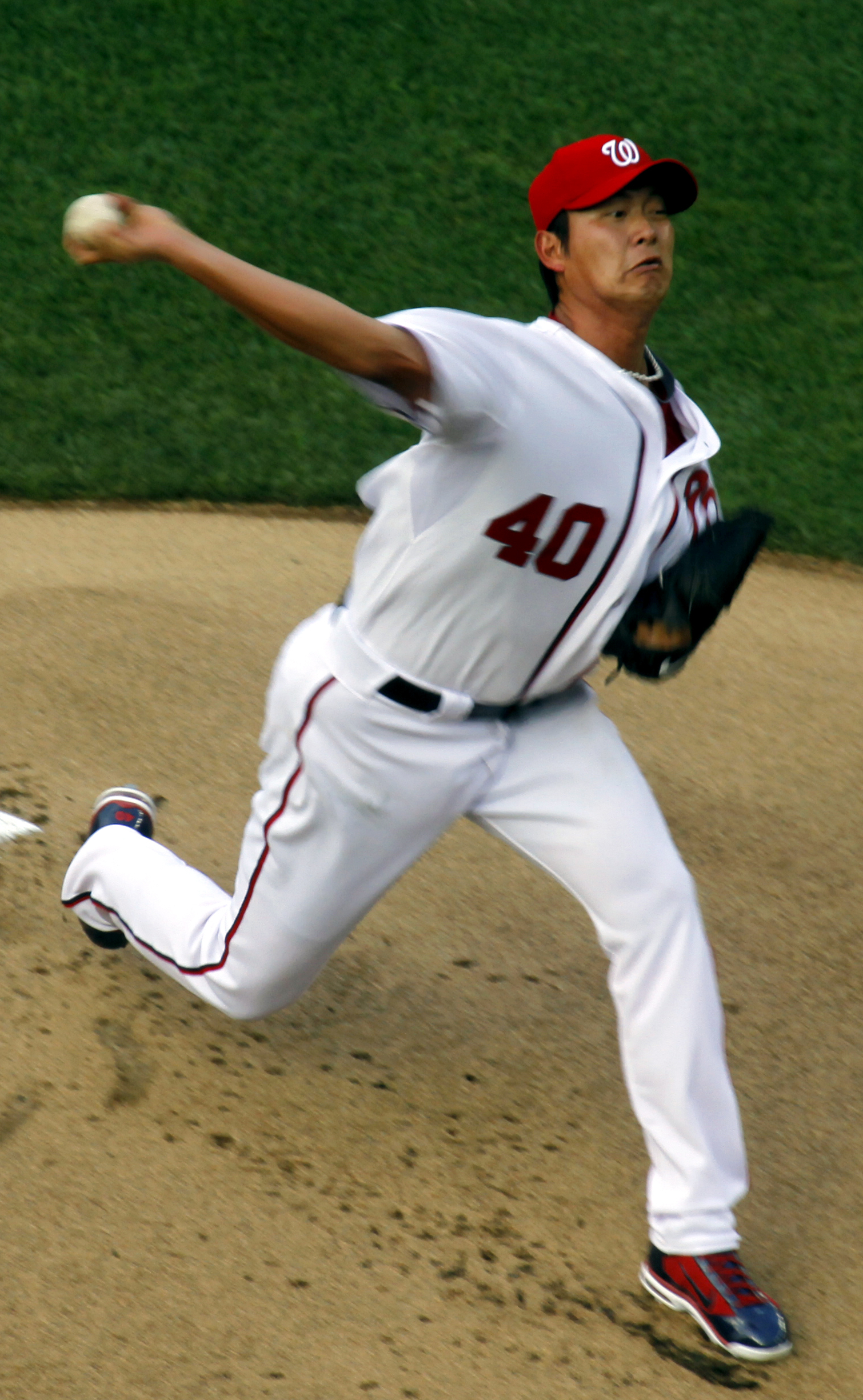
Wang pitching for the Washington Nationals in 2011

On February 19, 2010, the Washington Nationals announced they had signed Wang as a free agent to a $2 million deal (plus up to $3 million in incentives). In June, it was thought that Wang would return to the majors in late July or early August. However, Wang's rehabilitation had been inconsistent, and there was no timetable for his return to the majors. In September, the Nationals acknowledged that Wang would not pitch in the majors at all during the season, but instead was preparing for the instructional leagues in the fall.

Wang was non-tendered after the 2010 season. On December 16, 2010, Wang re-signed with the Nationals to a one-year, $1 million contract with $4 million worth of potential performance incentives. After continuing his injury rehabilitation, he began a formal rehab assignment on June 27 with the Nationals' Class A farm team, the Hagerstown Suns, pitching three innings, allowing two earned runs while striking out three and walking none. Although his velocity topped out at around 90 mph, it mostly sat between 86 and 88 mph. In his second start, on July 2 with the high-A Potomac Nationals, Wang pitched four shutout innings, and allowed two walks while striking out two. 63% of his 38 pitches were strikes while his velocity hit 91 mph in his final inning of work.

Following a July 24 start for the Triple-A Syracuse Chiefs, Wang made his Nationals debut on July 29. Wang ended the season with 11 starts, recorded 4–3 with a 4.04 ERA. He also made his first hit and first RBI in the majors in his final start of the season on September 24 against the Atlanta Braves' starting pitcher Brandon Beachy.

On October 30, 2011, Wang was granted free agency. Five days later on November 4, Wang re-signed with the Nationals to a one-year, $4 million contract.

On March 15, 2012, Wang sustained an injury to his left hamstring, placing him on the DL.

On May 25, Wang pitched in the majors for the first time since going on the disabled list. He went three innings in his first win that season. Wang then replaced Ross Detwiler in the team's starting rotation. In just four starts, Wang went 1–3 with an ERA of 6.10 and 11 strikeouts.

On September 23, Wang hit his first career double against Milwaukee Brewers' starting pitcher Yovani Gallardo.

=== Minor league stint with the Yankees ===
On March 22, 2013, Wang signed a minor league contract with the New York Yankees. According to his agents and Taiwan's EETV, his minors contract is worth US$35,000 per month, but could worth up to $2.5 million per year, with an extra $2.2 million in bonuses. However, if he did not secure a major league contract by the end of April, he had the option to revert to free-agent status. Wang opted out of his contract on June 7, 2013.

=== Toronto Blue Jays ===
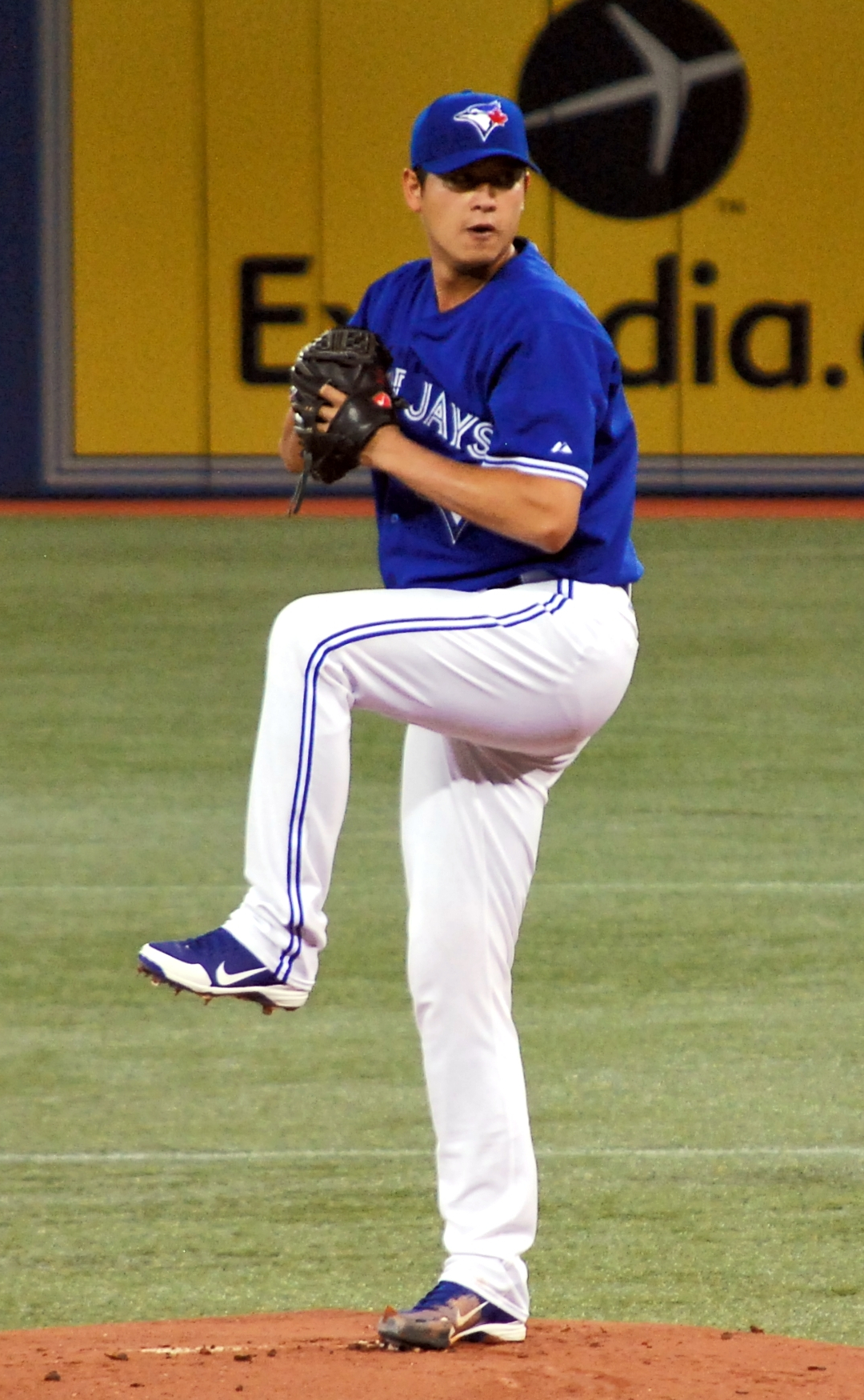
Wang pitching for the Toronto Blue Jays in 2013

Wang signed a one-year, $500,000 deal with the Toronto Blue Jays on June 9, 2013. He was added to the Blue Jays' roster on June 11, making his first pitching appearance as a starter against the Chicago White Sox. Toronto Blue Jays general manager Alex Anthopoulos said that the team guaranteed Wang one start, and would decide on further appearances based on the result of his first start. Wang earned his first win as a Blue Jay in a game against the Texas Rangers on June 16, pitching seven shutout innings. The win gave the Blue Jays their first four-game sweep in the 2013 season, and the first four-game sweep of the Rangers in Arlington in Blue Jays franchise history.

From June 11, the date Wang was added to their roster, to June 23, the Blue Jays went on an 11-game winning streak. Wang started three games during the streak, pitching at least six innings in each and compiling an ERA of 2.18. Wang followed up his successful streak by starting two games in which he was unable to make it out of the second inning. On June 27, Wang pitched 1 2/3 innings against the Boston Red Sox and surrendered six hits and seven earned runs. On July 2, he also pitched only 1 2/3 innings and gave up eight hits and six earned runs to the Detroit Tigers. After the Tigers game, Blue Jays manager John Gibbons announced that Wang had been designated for assignment. Wang was reported to be willing to accept an assignment to Triple-A Buffalo and was outrighted to Buffalo on July 5. Wang was added to the Blue Jays roster again on August 24, and designated for assignment on August 26. After clearing waivers, he was again outrighted to the Buffalo Bisons. He became a free agent on October 1.

=== Return to the minor leagues ===
On December 19, 2013, Wang signed a minor league contract with an invitation to spring training with the Cincinnati Reds. He began the 2014 season with the Louisville Bats of the International League, but opted out of his deal on July 13. Wang signed a minor league contract with the White Sox on July 17, and pitched for the Charlotte Knights of the International League.

During the 2014–15 offseason, Wang signed a minor league contract with the Atlanta Braves. The Braves assigned Wang to the Gwinnett Braves of the International League. In 10 starts and one relief appearance, Wang had a 2–6 record with an ERA of 6.10, while surrendering the most hits in Triple-A up to the month of June. He was released on June 19.

Wang signed with the Southern Maryland Blue Crabs of the Atlantic League of Professional Baseball, an independent baseball league, on June 24. He made three starts for the Blue Crabs, winning all three and pitching to a 2.49 ERA. On July 12, 2015, Wang signed a minor league contract with the Seattle Mariners. They assigned him to the Tacoma Rainiers of the Triple-A Pacific Coast League.

=== Kansas City Royals ===
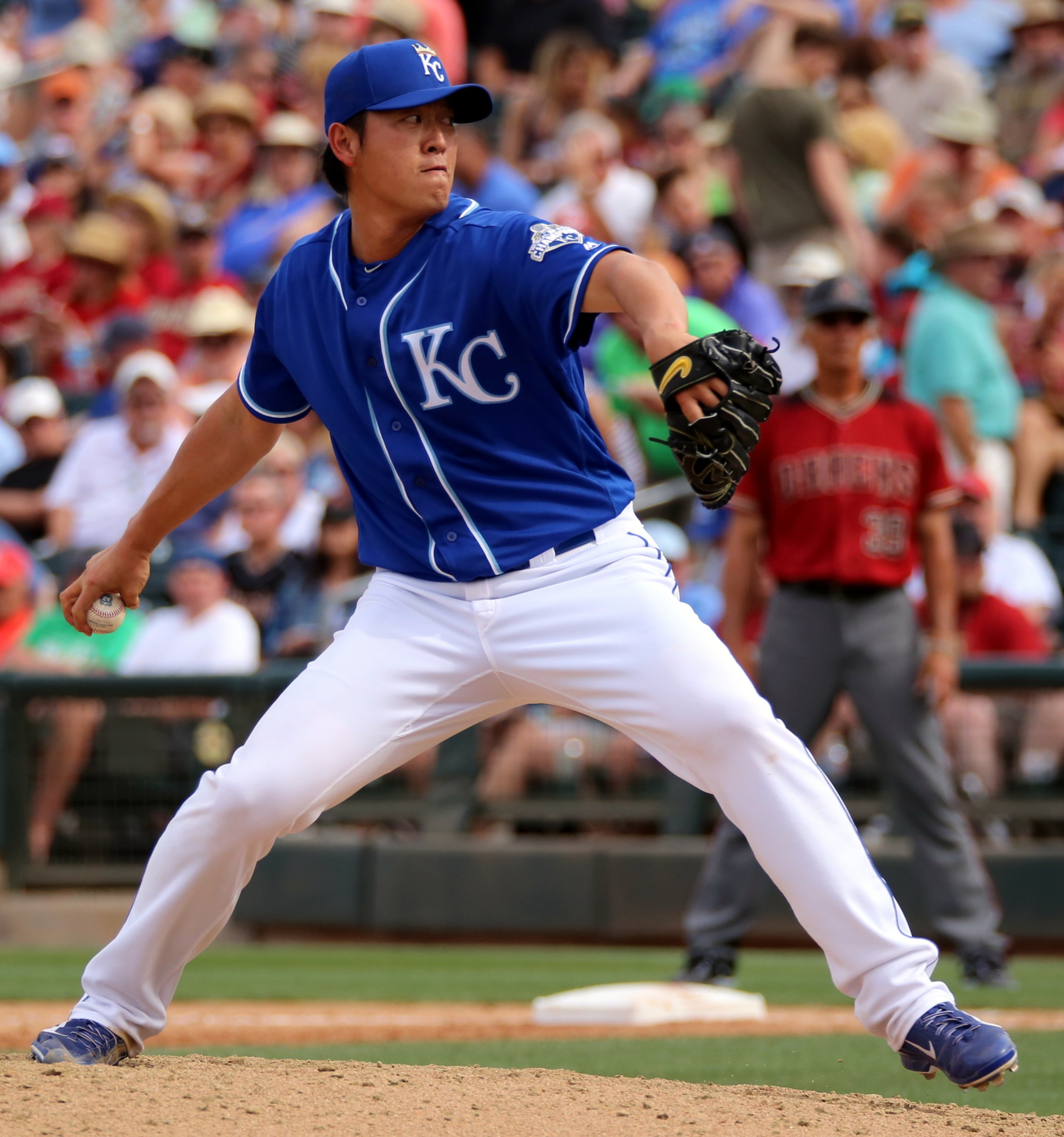
Wang pitching for the Kansas City Royals in 2016

On January 7, 2016, Wang signed a minor league contract with the Kansas City Royals. After a strong spring training, he made the Royals' opening day roster for the 2016 season as a relief pitcher. On April 9, 2016, Wang threw a scoreless ninth inning in a 7–0 victory against the Minnesota Twins. This was his first major league game since August 25, 2013. Wang pitched for the Royals 38 times for 53 1/3 innings over the year, going 6–0 with a 4.22 ERA. He went on the disabled list with right biceps tendinitis on August 31 and was designated for assignment on September 17, 2016. He was released on September 22.

== National baseball team ==
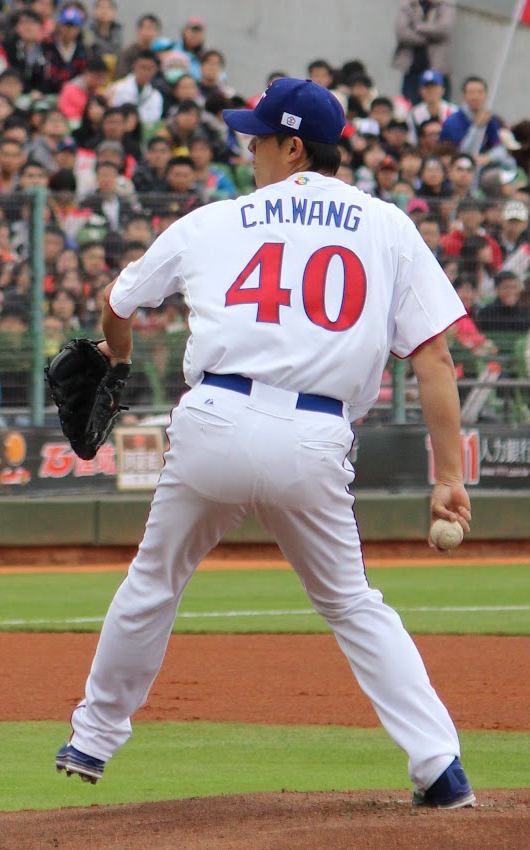
Wang pitching for Taiwan in 2013 World Baseball Classic

Wang pitched for the Chinese Taipei national baseball team in the 2002 Asian Games. In 2004, as the ace of the staff, Wang led Taiwan to the 2004 Olympic Games in Athens. Against Australia, he allowed just three hits with no walks, and at one point retired nine batters in a row, to earn the win. He also limited Japan to just five hits in the first six innings.

After being called up to the American major leagues, Wang was idolized in Taiwan where all of his games were televised nationwide, many on public big screens to large audiences. Because of this popularity, he was named one of the Time 100 for 2007.

At the 2013 World Baseball Classic, Wang started for the Taiwan team's opener against Australia and threw 6 shut out innings for the win. In the second round, Wang pitched six impressive scoreless innings against Japan, but was left with a no-decision when Japan rallied to win in the 10th inning.

== Coaching career ==
Wang joined the Fubon Guardians of Taiwan's Chinese Professional Baseball League in June 2018 as a guest coach. He remained with the team through the 2019 season. In 2020, Wang became the pitching coach for the CTBC Brothers, and focused particularly on pitching prospects on the Brothers' farm team. During the offseason in 2021, the Brothers announced that Wang had signed a new contract, and agreed to remain with the team as coach for three years.

On May 10, 2023, Wang shifted from the farm team pitching coach to the main team pitching coach.

== Scouting report ==
During his prime, Wang was a finesse pitcher with a power pitcher's velocity. In this period, he primarily relied on his power sinker along with the occasional four-seam fastball, slider, changeup, and splitter. His sinker, which was responsible for his elevation to ace status before his foot injury, had very impressive lateral movement and was thrown at greater than average velocity, sitting in the 91–94 mph range. Before his first shoulder injury, he also had a curveball until he was encouraged to opt for a sinker instead. By 2016, after a long recovery process, Wang's sinker had returned to the 89-93 mph range, with a top speed of 95 mph.

His strikeout pitch is an average slider that closely resembles the fastball coming out of his hand, thus getting batters to swing ahead of the pitch. Wang also throws a split-finger fastball, though he only uses the pitch sparsely when in need of a strikeout or double play. Wang's pitching style is characterized by efficiency, command of the strike zone, few walks, few home runs allowed but also records very few strikeouts. Wang works quickly and uses his ground-ball inducing sinker to produce many double plays. This efficiency often allows Wang to maintain a low pitch count deep into games.

In Taiwan and the minor leagues, Wang threw a more conventional assortment of pitches, including a four-seam fastball, a changeup, and far more splitters. The sinker, which has become Wang's signature pitch, was developed during his minor league career with advice from Neil Allen, his Triple-A pitching coach, and his Triple-A catcher, Sal Fasano.

Prior to the 2008 season, Wang relied on his sinking fastball about 90% of the time. However, after occasional bad outings, especially during the 2007 ALDS, Wang has worked to fully incorporate a slider and changeup into his repertoire. Through his first three starts of 2008, Wang used his slider roughly 20% of the time and his changeup around 8%.

== Personal life ==
In a 2006 The New York Times interview, Wang revealed that he is the biological child of the man he formerly thought was his uncle. Due to the media frenzy created in Taiwan over this, he briefly refused to give interviews to Taiwanese media.

Wang has also been taught basic English. He has resided in Fort Lee, New Jersey and Edgewater, New Jersey. Wang is married to Chia-Ling Wu. The couple has two sons, J.J., born 2009, and Wellington, born 2013. On April 23, 2012, Wang admitted to having an extramarital affair while he was recovering from a shoulder injury in 2009.

In the summer of 2011, Wang's biological maternal grandfather, a man surnamed Huang, 82, committed suicide in a park in Tainan, Taiwan by hanging himself with a piece of electrical cord, according to a news report in the Taipei Times. Wang often visited this maternal grandfather when he returned to Taiwan from time to time.

A documentary about Wang, Late Life: The Chien-Ming Wang Story, debuted in theaters in October 2018.

== See also ==
- List of Major League Baseball players from Taiwan
- List of Major League Baseball annual wins leaders
