= Attack Attack! II =

Studio album by Attack Attack!
- Released: August 8, 2025
- Genres: Metalcore, electronicore
- Length: 33:27
- Label: Oxide
- Producers: Andrew Baylis; Evan McKeever; Tyler Mead

Attack Attack! chronology
| Disaster (2024) | Attack Attack! II (2025) |

Attack Attack! studio albums chronology
| This Means War (2012) | Attack Attack! II (2025) |

Singles from Attack Attack! II
- 1. "Dance!" Released: May 9, 2025; 2. "Chainless" Released: May 9, 2025; 3. "One Hit Wonder" Released: June 15, 2025

Attack Attack! II is the fourth studio album and second self-titled album by American metalcore band Attack Attack!. It was released on August 8, 2025, through Oxide Records. It is their first full-length album in 13 years and the first to feature an all-new lineup assembled by drummer/keyboardist Andrew Wetzel; lead vocalist Chris Parketny, guitarist/clean vocalist Ryland Raus, and bassist Cameron Perry.

== Background ==
On May 2, 2025, it was speculated Chris Parketny, Cameron Perry and Ryland Raus have departed the band, with Wetzel being the only remaining member. With this announcement, Wetzel has announced a new album Attack Attack! II will be released on August 8. The first single "Dance!" along with "Chainless" were released on May 9, revealing that Parketny, Perry and Raus have not left the band. The two singles were noted as "a refreshing fusion of dance pop EDM and metal breakdowns, perfect for the Warped Tour scene adult who needs some metalcore to shake it to." "Dance!" in particular is compared with Electric Callboy and features guest vocals by Will Ramos of Lorna Shore.

== Reception ==
Professional ratings
Review scores
| Source | Rating |
|---|---|
| New Noise Magazine | 5/5 stars |

The album has received positive reviews from music critics, with some commending it as "a celebration of everything Attack Attack! was, is, and could be", with its ability to "replicate the nostalgia of the music while adapting to a new and improved sound".

== Track listing ==
Attack Attack! II track listing
| No. | Title | Writer(s) | Producer(s) | Length |
|---|---|---|---|---|
| 1. | "One Hit Wonder" | Chris Parketny; Andrew Wetzel; Andrew Baylis; Blake Hardman; Dan Pellarin | Baylis; Randy Slaugh^{[a]} | 3:11 |
| 2. | "Dance!" (featuring Will Ramos) | Parketny; Wetzel; Ryland Raus; Baylis; Pellarin | Baylis | 3:06 |
| 3. | "Chainless" | Parketny; Wetzel; Baylis; Conor Matthews; Riley Thomas | Baylis | 2:37 |
| 4. | "Walk on Water" (featuring Doobie) | Parketny; Wetzel; Baylis; Matthews; Eric Williams | Baylis; Slaugh^{[a]} | 3:04 |
| 5. | "Karmageddon" | Parketny; Wetzel; Evan McKeever; Cameron Walker; James Wrigley | Baylis; McKeever; Wrigley^{[a]} | 3:01 |
| 6. | "Live, Love, & Die" | Parketny; Wetzel; Baylis; Cameron Walker | Baylis; Slaugh^{[a]} | 2:40 |
| 7. | "I Complain on r/Metalcore" | Parketny; Wetzel; McKeever; Walker; Wrigley | McKeever; Wrigley^{[a]} | 3:18 |
| 8. | "Big Booty Britches" | Parketny; Wetzel; Baylis; Walker | Baylis | 3:11 |
| 9. | "Without You" | Parketny; Wetzel; Raus; McKeever; Tyler Mead | McKeever; Mead | 2:47 |
| 10. | "Sacrifice" | Parketny; Wetzel; Baylis; Pellarin; Sahaj Ticotin | Baylis; Slaugh^{[a]} | 3:02 |
| 11. | "Jump Jump!" | Parketny; Wetzel; Baylis; Pellarin; Casey Sabol | Baylis; Slaugh^{[a]}; Sabol^{[a]} | 3:30 |
| Total length: | | | | 33:27 |

=== Note ===
- ^{^[a]} signifies an additional producer

== Personnel ==
Credits adapted from Tidal.

=== Attack Attack! ===
- Chris Parketny – lead vocals
- Ryland Raus – guitars (all tracks), clean vocals (track 2)
- Cameron Perry – bass guitar
- Andrew Wetzel – drums, keyboards

=== Additional contributors ===
- Cody Stewart – mixing, mastering (1–8, 10, 11)
- Tyler Mead – mixing, mastering (9)
- Casey Sabol – engineering (4, 8)
- Randy Slaugh – post-production engineering (8)
- Lee Rouse – editing (11)
- Andrew Baylis – guitar (1–4, 6, 8, 10, 11)
- Will Ramos – vocals (2)
- Nathan Keeterle – guitar (4)
- Eric Williams – vocals (4)
- Evan McKeever – guitar (5, 7)
