= This Means War (Attack Attack! album) =

Studio album by Attack Attack!
- Released: January 17, 2012
- Recorded: October 2011
- Genre: Metalcore
- Length: 36:24
- Label: Rise
- Producer: Caleb Shomo

Attack Attack! chronology
Attack Attack! (2010)	This Means War (2012)	Long Time, No Sea (2021)

Attack Attack! studio albums chronology
Attack Attack! (2010)	This Means War (2012)	Attack Attack! II (2025)

Singles from This Means War
- 1. "The Motivation" Released: December 20, 2011; 2. "The Wretched" Released: January 12, 2012; 3. "The Revolution" Released: July 1, 2012

This Means War is the third studio album by American metalcore band Attack Attack!. It was released on January 17, 2012, through Rise Records. Initially scheduled to be produced by John Feldmann (who previously produced tracks for the band's reissue of their self-titled album), production was instead handled by frontman Caleb Shomo in his home studio, making it the band's only album not to be produced by Joey Sturgis.

It is also the only album to feature Shomo on both singing and screamed vocals, after the departure of former singer/guitarist Johnny Franck. It was also the final album by the band before its disbandment in 2013, until the band reunited in October 2020.

This Means War received generally mixed to fairly positive reviews from music critics, with some commending it as an improvement over the band's previous material, while others criticized its use of formula. It has since become the band's most commercially successful album to date, peaking at number 11 on the Billboard 200, selling more than 17,000 copies in its first week.

== Background ==
In October 2011, the band began recording the album. On November 6, 2011, it was announced that the album was completed. On November 14, 2011, it was announced that This Means War would be released on January 17, 2012. Along with this news they also posted dates for the "This Means War Tour" with supporting acts The Ghost Inside, Sleeping with Sirens, Chunk! No, Captain Chunk!, and Dream On, Dreamer. The band headlined the This World Is Ours Tour with Escape The Fate and the Word Alive from April to May 2012.

On November 20, 2011, Attack Attack! filmed a music video for the song "The Wretched." On December 13, 2011, the first single titled "The Motivation" was streamed on YouTube and was released for digital download on December 20, 2011. On January 12, 2012, the band debuted the music video for the second single off the album, "The Wretched". On July 1, they premiered a music video for the third single, "The Revolution".

== Composition ==
In an interview with Loudwire, drummer Andrew Wetzel stated that the band went into the writing process without "anybody on the outside to touch anything on this record." The group went into the recording studio without talking to anybody for 35 days and came out with the album. Guitarist Andrew Whiting described the record as "heavier and darker" and noted how the writing process was different since the departure of former clean vocalist and rhythm guitarist Johnny Franck. Speaking about the song titles, the band titled them in a way that "acts of a play or the chapters of a book" to make it "one coherent story." The album's concept is about soldiers going to war which for the band, is a metaphor for "what it's like to be in a band and go on tour." The album was produced by Caleb Shomo and was recorded in October 2011. Whiting felt that self-producing the album rather than working with past producers like Joey Sturgis or John Feldmann helped them find their "core sound." The group spent working on instrumentals on most of the songs first, before Shomo wrote them.

== Reception ==
Professional ratings
Aggregate scores
Source	Rating
Metacritic	60%
Review scores
Source	Rating
About.com	2/5 stars
AbsolutePunk	(40%)
AllMusic	3.5/5 stars
Alternative Press	3.5/5 stars
Bloody Disgusting	Slightly favorable
Consequence of Sound	1.5/5 stars
Kerrang!	3/5 stars
Melodic	3.5/5 stars
Metal Hammer	7/10 stars
The Washington Post	Slightly favorable

This Means War received mixed reviews from music critics. At Metacritic, the album has a score of 60 out of 100, indicating "mixed or average reviews based on 6 critics". Gregory Heaney of Allmusic gave the album a 3.5/5 rating and said "Attack Attack! strip down their sound and focus on heaviness, making This Means War their hardest hitting and most coherent record to date" and continued "by not trying to force an evolution, Attack Attack! have managed to actually push their sound in a new and interesting direction". Alternative Press noted that "This Means War exhibits admirable growth, but if Attack Attack! radically purged themselves of all their pop predilections in favor of more savage riffage and chattering electronics, they’d set the bar so high, they’d be touring with the Dillinger Escape Plan and Converge’s Kurt Ballou would wear their shirts onstage." Allison Stewart of The Washington Post noted that "Ohio-based Attack Attack!’s main claim to fame is its alleged authorship of crabcore, in which band members squat-walk like crabs", and while the band members are "viewed as insufficiently ferocious scenesters by hard-rock purists", Attack Attack! "changed things up slightly on its latest outing, a pop metal concept album that places most of its emphasis on metal." Stewart concluded that "Although Attack Attack! has never sounded tighter or smarter, this latest effort will never find an audience on the dance floor." Other reviews were much more negative. About.com gave the album a 2 out of 5 and stated that This Means War "is stale and predictable" and lacking imagination, and that while heavy metal music should change, "it shouldn’t sound like this." Sloane Daley of Punknews.org commented that while the album "is a step in the right direction for Attack Attack!", the "progress feels like it might be a band plateauing." Consequence of Sound webzine was severely critical, giving the album 1.5 out of 5 stars, saying that the album was a "deluge of whining that’s lyrically incomprehensible" that "becomes sonically dull after one song." Consequence of Sound continued on to say that the only sonic stamp to separate the band from similar metalcore acts are its electronic flourishes.

Speaking about the album in retrospect, Wetzel felt that the process started off "really strong but the cycle fell off really hard with no one around to push."

=== Commercial performance ===
This Means War has since become the band's highest-charting album to date, debuting and peaking at number 11 on the Billboard 200 and selling more than 17,000 copies in its first week. The album peaked at number four on the Top Rock Albums chart, number four on the Top Alternative Albums chart, at number two on the Independent Albums chart, and number two on the Hard Rock Albums charts. On iTunes, it peaked at number one on the Rock charts and charted at number eight overall. It also reached number 120 on the Canadian Albums Chart.

== Track listing ==
All tracks are written by Attack Attack!

No.	Title	Length
1.	"The Revolution"	4:11
2.	"The Betrayal"	3:26
3.	"The Hopeless"	3:37
4.	"The Reality"	3:50
5.	"The Abduction"	3:01
6.	"The Motivation"	4:06
7.	"The Wretched"	4:06
8.	"The Family"	3:11
9.	"The Confrontation"	3:36
10.	"The Eradication"	3:21
Total length:		36:24

== Personnel ==
Attack Attack!

- John Holgado – bass guitar, backing vocals
- Caleb Shomo – lead vocals, keyboards, synthesizers, guitars
- Andrew Wetzel – drums
- Andrew Whiting – guitars

Production

- Caleb Shomo – production, recording, mixing
- Sean Mackowski – vocal engineering
- Dave Shapiro – booking
- Joey Simmrin – management
- Megan Thompson – art direction, design, photography

== Charts ==
Chart performance for This Means War
Chart (2012)	Peak position
Canadian Albums (Billboard)	120
US Billboard 200	11
US Independent Albums (Billboard)	2
US Top Rock Albums (Billboard)	4
