= Attack Attack! (American band) =

American metalcore band

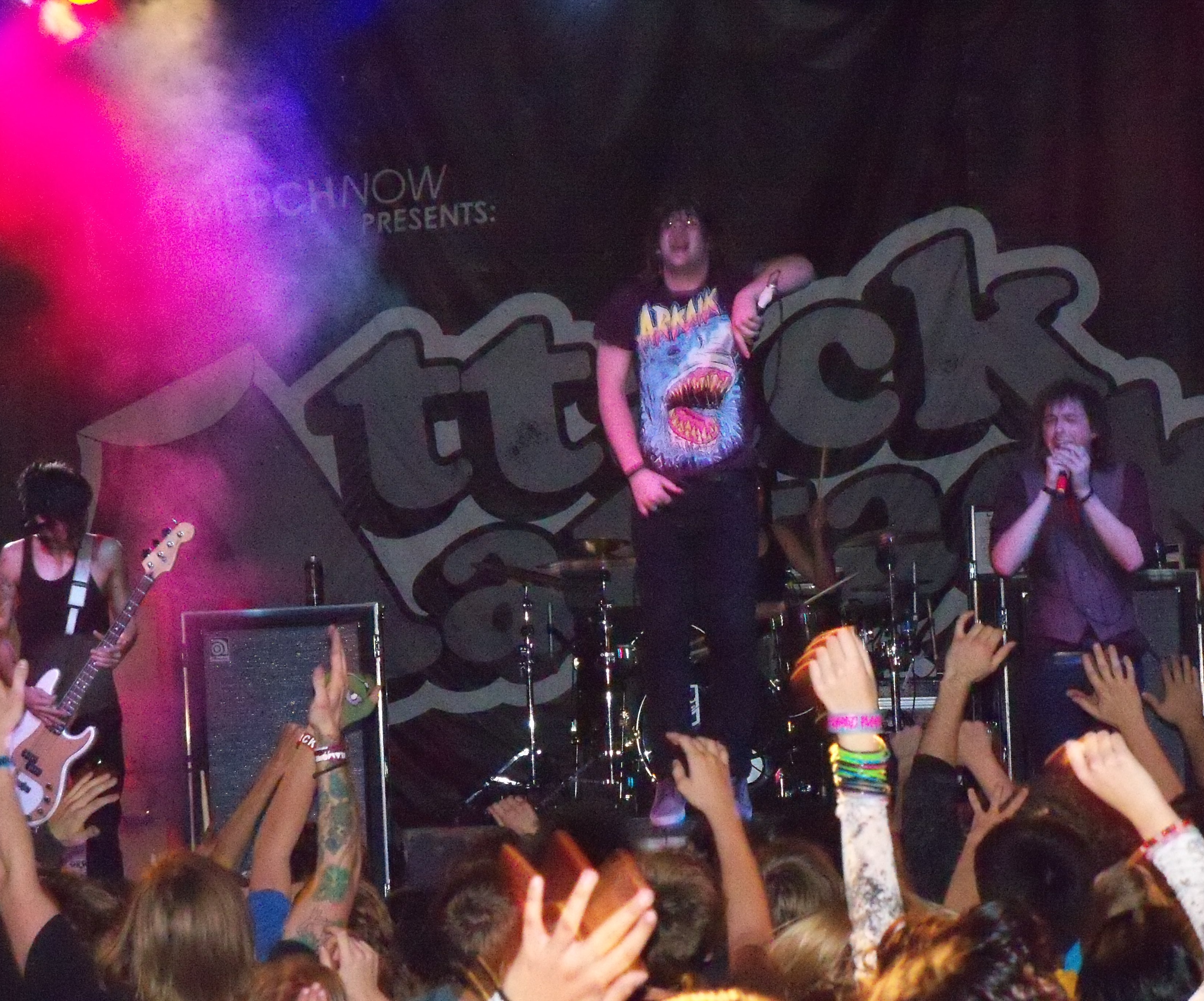
- Attack Attack! performing in 2010

Background information
- Also known as: Ambiance (2007)
- Origin: Columbus, Ohio, U.S.
- Genres: Metalcore; electronicore; post-hardcore
- Years active: 2007–2013; 2020–present
- Labels: Rise; Oxide
- Spinoffs: Of Mice & Men; Beartooth; Bilmuri
- Members: Andrew Wetzel; Chris Parketny; Cameron Perry; Ryland Raus
- Past members: Ricky Lortz; Nick White; Austin Carlile; Nick Barham; Johnny Franck; John Holgado; Caleb Shomo; Phil Druyor; Tyler Sapp; Jay Miller; Andrew Whiting
- Website: attackattackshop.us

Attack Attack! is an American metalcore band from Westerville, Ohio, originally formed in 2007 as Ambiance. After self-releasing their first EP in 2007, the band signed to Rise Records the same year. They have released four full-length albums, Someday Came Suddenly, Attack Attack!, This Means War and Attack Attack! II. The band left Rise Records in 2012 and disbanded the following year after a farewell tour. On October 19, 2020, the band announced a re-formation, with a mix of returning and new members.

== History ==
=== Formation (2007) ===
The band formed in 2007, when Johnny Franck, Andrew Whiting, Nick White and Andrew Wetzel met Austin Carlile while playing in local high school bands. Caleb Shomo joined the band as the keyboardist, and they changed their name to Attack Attack!. Nick White was also later replaced by John Holgado. The band entered a local studio where they recorded material that was put up on MySpace to promote their music. As the oldest member of the band, Wetzel also acted as their manager for most of the year. The band was taken on by manager Eric Rushing of The Artery Foundation, who signed them to Rise Records in May 2008. As members of the band were still underage at this point, contractual discussions required parental consent. The material recorded in 2007 was put together on the EP If Guns Are Outlawed, Can We Use Swords? (2008). The band was also signed by booking agent David Shapiro of the Agency Group that resulted in nationwide tours. One of the first songs the group wrote was "Stick Stickly", which the band recorded a demo version of at Paper Tiger Studios.

=== Someday Came Suddenly (2007–2009) ===
In November 2008, they released their debut studio album, Someday Came Suddenly, on Rise. They recorded the album at The Foundation in Connersville, Indiana. Many songs on the album were re-recorded tracks originally released on the If Guns Are Outlawed EP. Producer Joey Sturgis recalled him being "the perfect producer" for the album, and wanted to "make it over-the-top polished and perfect as possible. But super-brutal, but super-poppy." The album debuted at number 193 on the Billboard 200, with sales of more than 3,600 in its first week despite mediocre reviews. The album also peaked at number nine on the Billboard Independent Albums chart. The album has sold 70,000 copies as of April 2010.

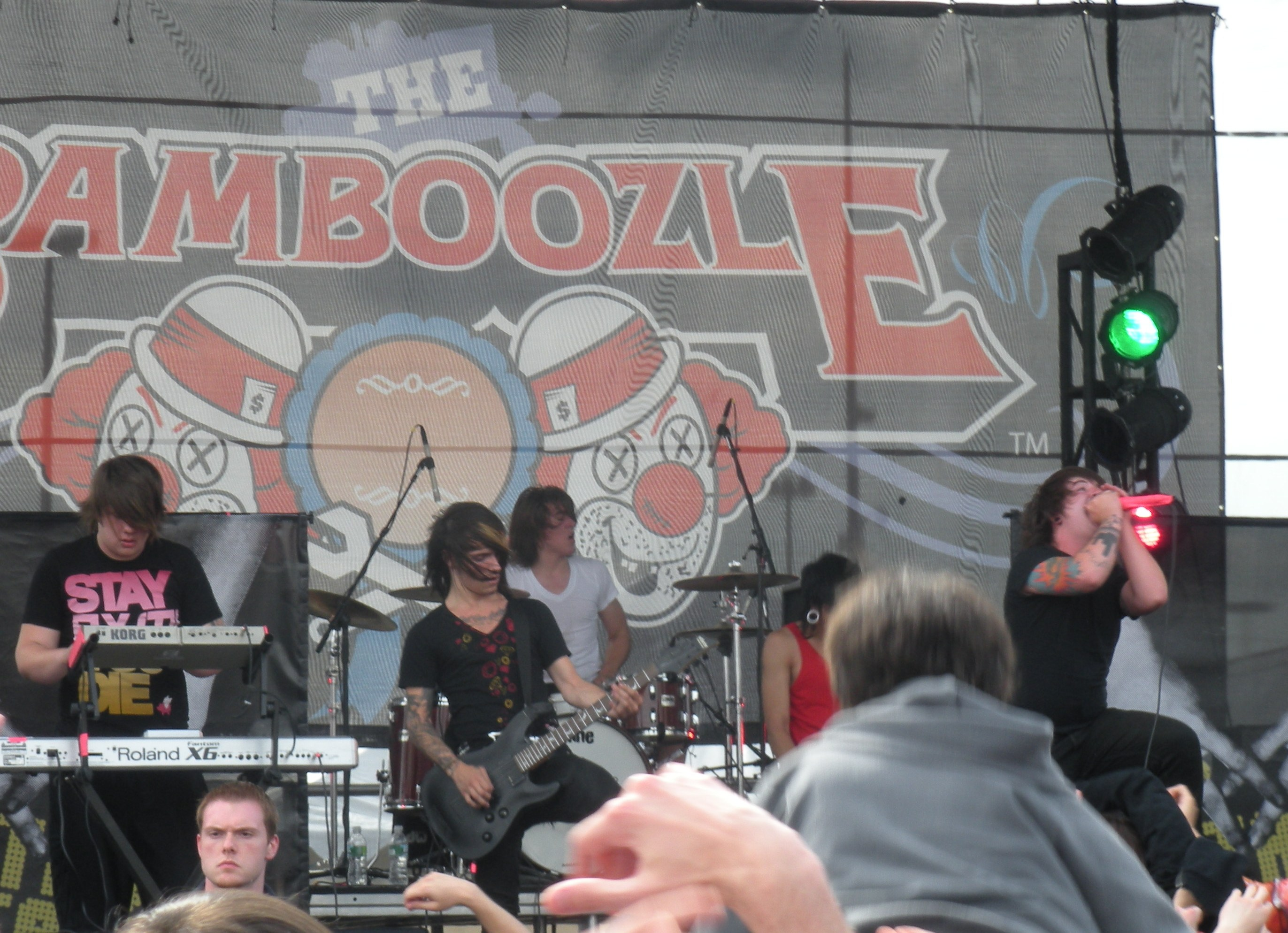
Attack Attack! performing with Barham as a part of the band at 2009's Bamboozle festival held in New Jersey

In the fall of 2008, the group toured with Maylene and the Sons of Disaster, A Static Lullaby, Showbread and Confide. Halfway through the tour, vocalist Austin Carlile was ejected from the band and replaced with Nick Barham, brother of former Sleeping with Sirens drummer Gabe Barham. According to Barham, he learned the songs on a plane ride, upon joining the band. Drummer Andrew Wetzel later revealed in a blog post via MySpace that the band dropped Carlile due to his behavioral attitude on the road. The group also joined Escape the Fate on their US headlining tour in February and March 2009, along with Black Tide, William Control, and Burn Halo. The band was part of the Warped Tour 2009 where they appeared on one of the smaller stages.

Attack Attack! released a music video for their debut single "Stick Stickly" in June 2009. The video led to a number of criticisms, including lengthy pieces by Buddyhead and the British newspaper The Guardian. It also lead to the creation of the internet meme "crabcore", mocking the "crab-like" stance of Attack Attack!'s guitarist Andrew Whiting featured in the music video. The band also released a live video for their second single, "Dr. Shavargo Pt. 3" in August 2009. The group was featured on Punk Goes Pop Volume Two, covering the song "I Kissed a Girl" by Katy Perry. The song garnered heavy radio airplay.

In October 2009, the group embarked on a headlining tour with I Set My Friends on Fire. However, on October 19, lead vocalist Nick Barham announced his departure from Attack Attack! just two days short of their headliner tour; he stated in his blog on MySpace that "It was just time for change", and that there was no conflict between him and the other band members. He also said he had plans to start a new musical project. The band then made the decision for Shomo to be moved as the band's primary vocalist but still remaining as keyboardist as well.

=== Self-titled album and Franck's departure (2010–2011) ===
The group toured with Breathe Carolina, I See Stars, Asking Alexandria, and Bury Tomorrow on the Artery Foundation Across The Nation Tour in March 2010. In April 2010, Wetzel confirmed that ten tracks would appear on their second album. The album was initially titled Shazam, but due to copyright issues, it was self-titled. The album's lead single, "Sexual Man Chocolate", was released on May 16, 2010. On May 25, the group released, "Smokahontas" as the second single from the album. Their second album Attack Attack! was released on June 8, 2010. The album sold 15,000 copies in its first week, debuting at number 27 on the Billboard 200. The album also topped the Billboard Independent Albums chart. They headlined the This Is a Family Tour in November 2010 with support from Emmure, Pierce the Veil, In Fear and Faith, and Of Mice & Men.

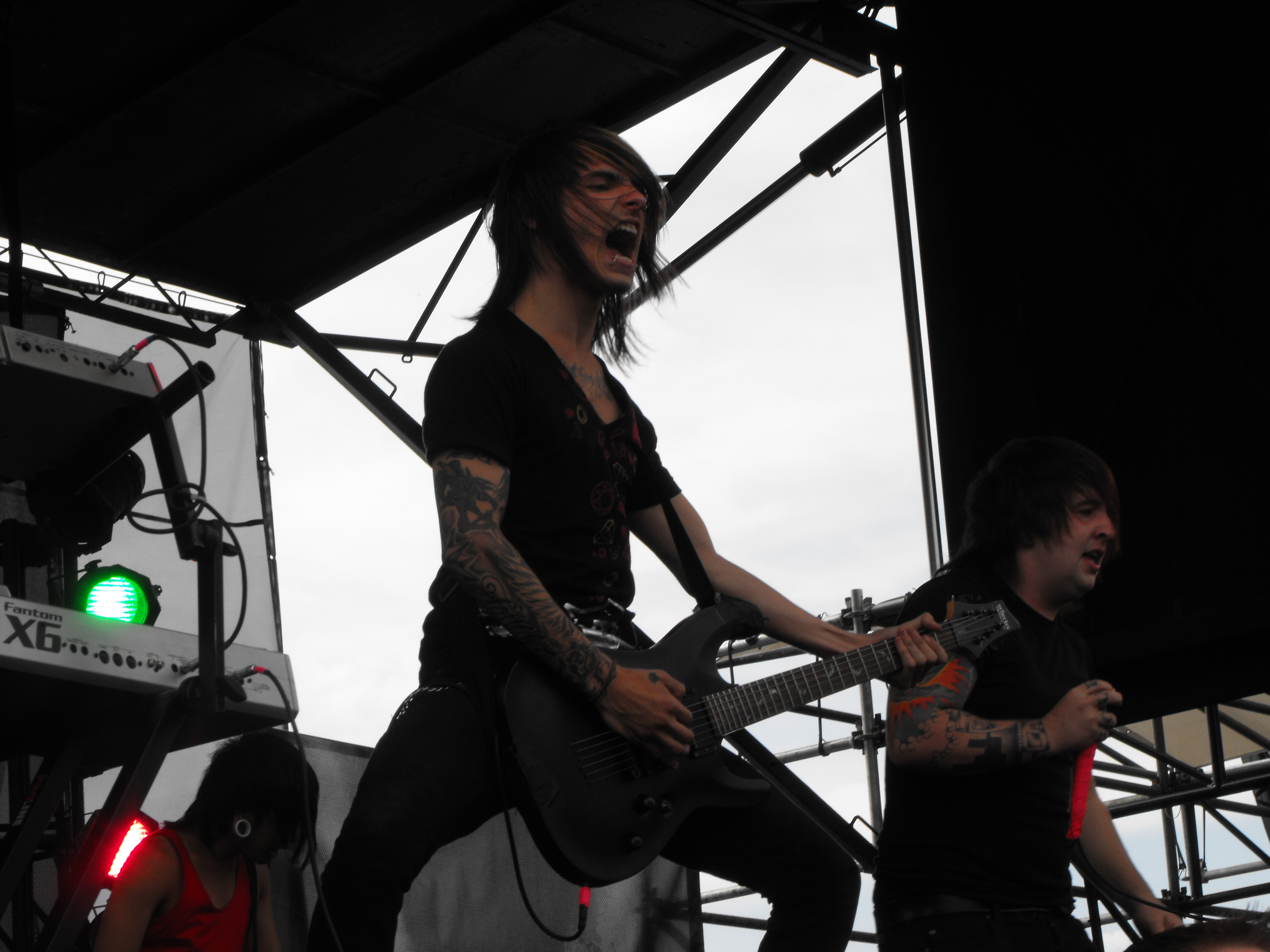
Guitarist Andrew Whiting performing in May 2009

On November 10, 2010, Johnny Franck announced he had departed from the band to focus on his relationship with God. He then started a project called The March Ahead. With this news also came a clip of a new song featuring Shomo on lead vocals. The music video for "Smokahontas" was released on January 21, 2011, and was directed by Thunder Down Country films. It is the last video to feature Johnny Franck and also includes appearances from Sean Mackowski of My Ticket Home and former vocalist of In Fear and Faith Cody Anderson.

In June 2011, the band released a single, "Last Breath", from the deluxe edition of their second album. On July 18, 2011, the group premiered a track titled "Criminal", which appeared on the deluxe edition of their second studio album. On July 19, the group re-issued their second studio album with different artwork and eight bonus tracks. The group performed at Warped Tour in the summer of 2011. In September 2011, the group was set to join Sum 41 on their South American tour before it was cancelled due to vocalist Deryck Whibley's medical condition.

=== This Means War and second lineup change (2011–2012) ===
In October 2011, the band began recording their third studio album. On November 6, 2011, it was announced that the album had been completed. On November 14, it was announced that the band's third full-length, This Means War would be released on January 17, 2012. The entire album was produced by Shomo at his home studio. Along with this news, they also posted dates for the This Means War Tour, with supporting acts from The Ghost Inside, Sleeping with Sirens, Chunk! No, Captain Chunk!, and Dream On, Dreamer. On December 10, 2011, the band performed at the Unsilent Night 4 festival. On December 20, 2011, they released "The Motivation" as the album's lead single via iTunes. On January 12, 2012, the band debuted the music video for the second single off the album, "The Wretched". On July 1, they premiered a music video for the third single, "The Revolution". This Means War peaked at number 11 on the Billboard 200, selling 17,000 copies in its first week.

The band announced in 2012 their departure from Rise Records, simultaneous with an announcement that they had completed ten songs, produced by John Feldmann, for another album, although Wetzel said on his Formspring "they're somewhere in Feldmann's hard drive" and that it "would be too much work legally to get them released". The band stated that they "don't have another record label or anything lined up and [are] probably not planning on going to another one", also that Wetzel "has [his] own label now [Oxide Entertainment] and will probably just use that." The band headlined the This World Is Ours Tour with Escape the Fate and the Word Alive.

On December 13, 2012, bassist John Holgado announced his departure from the band. Days later on December 18, Caleb Shomo officially announced his departure from Attack Attack!, along with confirming the new vocalist of the band to be Phil Druyor of I Am Abomination. Shomo cited mental health issues as a reason for his departure. He went on to form Beartooth that same year.

On December 19, 2012, the band released a song titled "No Defeat" through Alternative Press with the new line-up. It was the first song to feature Phil Druyor on vocals and Tyler Sapp on bass. Andrew Wetzel also stated that the band would record more songs after "No Defeat".

=== Cancelled fourth studio album, final tours and Nativ (2013–2015) ===
Between January and February 2013, Attack Attack! released two video updates about their fourth studio album, which was never released. The band started touring in Europe again with the new members later that year. On April 22, 2013, Attack Attack! said that the Back in Action tour was going to be their last tour and the band would be "laid to rest".

The final lineup of Attack Attack! formed another band, Nativ. Material written for Nativ began back in September 2012, which was originally for Attack Attack!'s fourth studio album. Nativ's members consisted of Phil Druyor, Andrew Wetzel, Andrew Whiting, Tyler Sapp, and William Honto. The group released three songs, "Lately", "Not Yours" and "Subtle Ticks". They made their first live performance at Riot Fest in September 2013. They also embarked on a fall tour with Sylar and Lionfight. On November 13, 2013, Nativ was delayed due to a physical altercation between Andrew Wetzel and Andrew Whiting, leading to a legal battle.

In 2014, Dryuor formed a band called the Bad Chapter, releasing their debut single "Deal with the Devil" in July. Drummer Andrew Wetzel started a group called Nine Shrines in August 2014. Guitarist Andrew Whiting returned with a band, Drudge, in 2015.

=== Reunion, Long Time, No Sea, Dark Waves and Disaster (2020–2024) ===
In October 2020, the band reunited and worked in the studio with producer Joey Sturgis writing new material, with a single titled "All My Life" that was released on December 7, 2020. The new lineup was later confirmed to consist of original members Andrew Wetzel and Andrew Whiting, as well as new members, bassist Jay Miller and vocalist Chris Parketny. Miller's tenure was brief, and he was quickly replaced by Cameron Perry.

On April 20, 2021, Attack Attack! released a single titled "Kawaii Cowboys". It features a blend of style described as country, J-pop, and metalcore. On April 30, the band released the song "Brachyura Bombshell". In October 2021, the group released their second EP, Long Time, No Sea. From March to April 2022, the band embarked on the East Coast Scuttle tour with support from Conquer Divide, Until I Wake, and Across the White Water Tower. They co-headlined the Level Up tour with Electric Callboy in October and November 2022.

On February 10, 2023, the band released two singles, "Dark Waves" and "Paralyzed (Until We Meet Again)" in anticipation of their EP, titled Dark Waves, released on March 31, 2023. The group embarked on the Dark Waves tour in May 2023.

Whiting has been absent since May 2023. On January 18, 2024, the band posted promo pictures onto social media confirming Whiting had left the band, leaving Wetzel as the last remaining original member.

On May 16, 2024, Attack Attack! released a single titled "Concrete". On June 14, the band released another single, "Disaster". These two singles were written before Whiting's departure as he received writing credits for both tracks.

The third single, titled "Blood on the Walls", was released on July 12, and just like the other two singles, Whiting received writing credits. The fourth single, "We All Meet Up in the End", was released on August 23 along with the announcement of the EP Disaster, which was released on September 20, 2024.

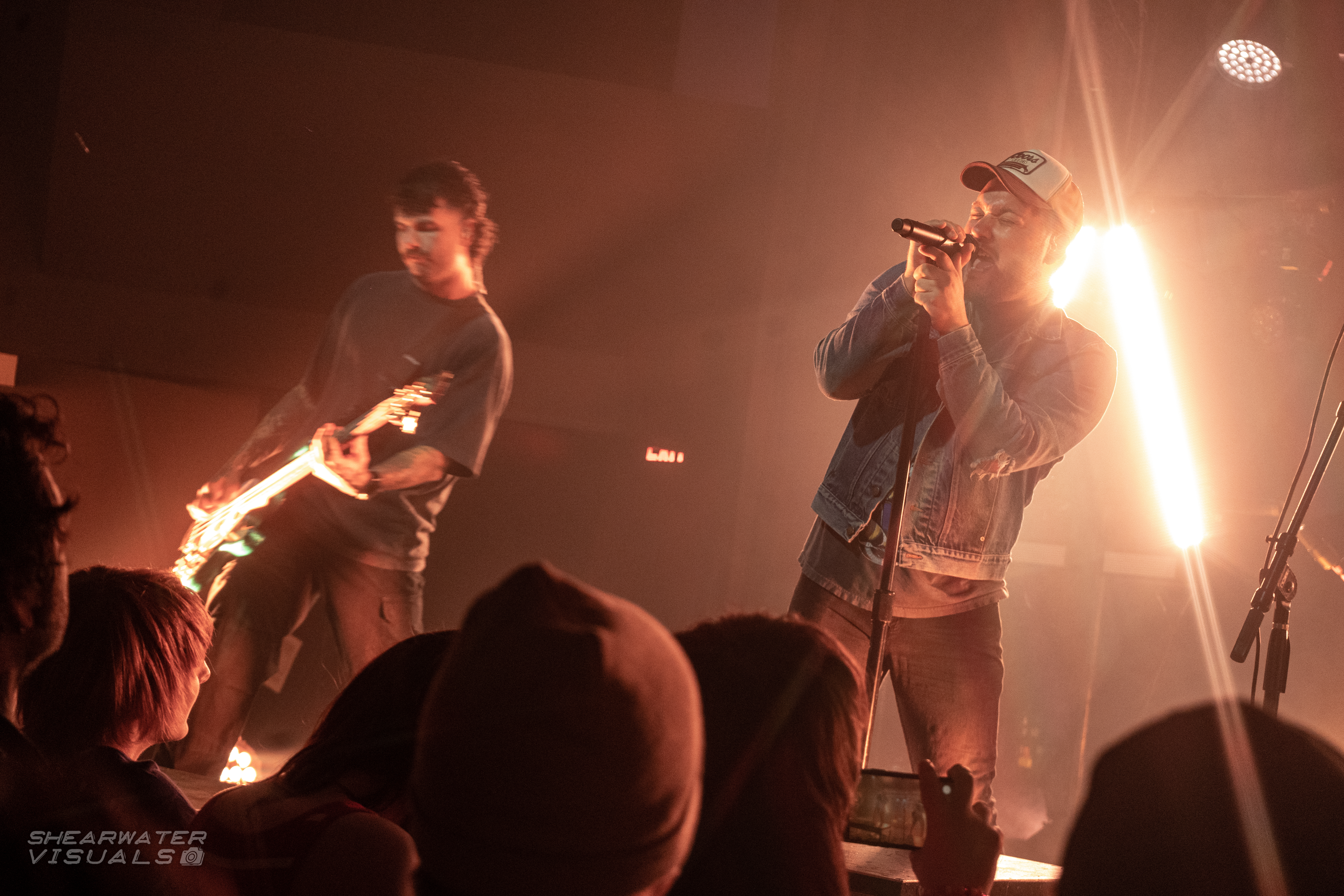
Attack Attack! performing at The Regency Live - 2025

=== Attack Attack! II (2025–present) ===
On May 2, 2025, it was speculated Chris Parketny, Cameron Perry and Ryland Raus had departed the band, with Wetzel being the only remaining member. With this announcement, Wetzel announced the album Attack Attack! II would be released on August 8. The first single, "Dance", along with "Chainless", were released on May 9, revealing that Parketny, Perry and Raus had not left the band.

== Musical style and influences ==
Attack Attack! have been described as "screamo/crabcore Christian rockers", electronicore, and post-hardcore combined with electronica influences. Drummer Andrew Wetzel denied the group being a Christian band and has even expressed his discontent under the label, as well as the group being called "emo." Kerrang! described them as an "era-defining Myspace band" due to their use of the platform to promote their music early in their career. Metal Hammer also gave them this label.

Writing for Red Bull, music journalist Eli Enis stated that the band was known for "brazenly stuffing their hulking metalcore songs with gooey pop hooks, neon synths, and ravey effects" in a way similar to Asking Alexandria, I See Stars and Enter Shikari.

The group has cited inspiration from Pet Shop Boys, Erasure, The Devil Wears Prada and Enter Shikari.

== Legacy ==
Attack Attack! have been regarded as pioneers of the crabcore microgenre. The music video for "Stick Stickly" went viral online and gained recognition for the band members' headbanging moves. Pitchfork assessed: "Chugging, drop-tuned metalcore mixing blast beats and Cookie Monster vocals with crunk and dance music was not especially novel in 2008, but Ohio's Attack Attack! brought something new to the table: a squat, waddling stance—feet splayed, knees at right angles, bottoms practically bumping against the ground—that made them look like scuttling crustaceans holding aloft electric guitars. Their shtick went viral almost instantly, as other groups embraced Attack Attack!'s admixture of chugging guitars, demonic growls, Auto-Tuned choir-boy choruses, and Eurodance synths—not to mention, of course, their manspreading moves and insouciant scene hair. Incredibly, Attack Attack! are still running with crabcore, but should their fame ever wane, they can always get jobs as professional movers—after all, they already know how to lift with their legs."

Michael Siebert of Invisible Oranges wrote in 2018: "It's almost better to think of Attack Attack! as a modern example of outsider music, the soundtrack for what the late Mark Fisher once referred to as 'capitalist realism' — an amalgamation of disparate parts that have proven profitable, mashed together. No bands have come along since Attack Attack! that even come close to matching their strangeness."

== Band members ==
Current

- Andrew Wetzel – drums (2007–2013; 2020–present), keyboards (2012–2013; 2020–present)
- Chris Parketny – lead vocals (2020–present)
- Cameron Perry – bass, backing vocals (2021–present)
- Ryland Raus – clean vocals, rhythm guitar (2022–present), lead guitar (2023–present)

Former

- Ricky Lortz – clean vocals, rhythm guitar (2007)
- Nick White – bass (2007–2008)
- Austin Carlile – unclean vocals (2007–2008)
- Nick Barham – unclean vocals (2008–2009)
- Johnny Franck – clean vocals, rhythm guitar (2007–2010)
- John Holgado – bass (2007–2012), backing vocals (2010–2012)
- Caleb Shomo – keyboards (2008–2012), unclean vocals (2009–2012), clean vocals, rhythm guitar (2010–2012), backing vocals (2008–2009)
- Phil Druyor – clean vocals (2012–2013)
- Tyler Sapp – bass (2012–2013)
- Jay Miller – bass, backing vocals (2020–2021); unclean vocals (2013; touring)
- Andrew Whiting – lead guitar (2007–2013; 2020–2023), keyboards (2012–2013; 2020–2023); rhythm guitar (2012–2013), bass (2012)

Touring

- Sean Mackowski – clean vocals, rhythm guitar (2010–2012)
- Jeremy Gilmore – unclean vocals (2013)
- Sean Bell – rhythm guitar, backing vocals (2013)

Timeline

== Discography ==
Studio albums

- Someday Came Suddenly (2008)
- Attack Attack! (2010)
- This Means War (2012)
- Attack Attack! II (2025)
