= Disaster (EP) =

2024 EP by Attack Attack!

EP by Attack Attack!
- Released: September 20, 2024
- Genre: Alternative metal; metalcore
- Length: 15:59
- Label: Oxide
- Producer: Andrew Baylis; Cameron Mizell

Attack Attack! chronology
Dark Waves (2023)	Disaster (2024)	Attack Attack! II (2025)

Singles from Disaster
- 1. "Concrete" Released: May 16, 2024; 2. "Disaster" Released: June 14, 2024; 3. "Blood on the Walls" Released: July 12, 2024; 4. "We All Meet Up in the End" Released: August 23, 2024

Disaster is the fourth EP by American metalcore band Attack Attack!. It was released on September 20, 2024, through Oxide Records. It is the band's first release to not feature guitarist Andrew Whiting, though he did receive writing credits. All tracks have music videos, The music video of "Spitfire" was released on the same day as the EP release.

== Promotion ==
The first single from the EP, "Concrete", was released on May 16, 2024. It was followed by two more singles, "Disaster" released on June 14, 2024, and "Blood on the Walls" released on July 12, 2024. On August 23, 2024, the single "We All Meet Up in the End" was released along with the announcement of the Disaster EP.

== Track listing ==
All tracks are written by Attack Attack! and Andrew Whiting.

Disaster
No.	Title	Length
1.	"Concrete"	3:18
2.	"Blood on the Walls"	3:16
3.	"Disaster"	3:25
4.	"Spitfire"	3:04
5.	"We All Meet Up in the End"	2:56
Total length:		15:59

== Personnel ==
Attack Attack!

- Chris Parketny – lead vocals
- Ryland Raus – guitars
- Cameron Perry – bass guitar
- Andrew Wetzel – drums, keyboards

Other personnel

- Andrew Whiting – additional songwriting
- Andrew Baylis – production
- Cameron Mizell – production
- Randy Slaugh – programming
