= Late Life: The Chien-Ming Wang Story =

- Theatrical release poster
- Directed by: Frank W Chen
- Written by: Hui-Chuan Chan; Wen-Hao Winston Chou
- Produced by: Frank W Chen; Hai-Tao Wu; Brian Yang
- Starring: Chien-Ming Wang; Alan Chang; Neil Allen; Brian Cashman
- Cinematography: Hai-Tao Wu
- Edited by: Amy Chih-Hsin Lee
- Music by: Shawn Sutta; Adam Robl
- Production companies: WYC Motions; EBOS International; Activator Marketing Company; 408 Films
- Distributed by: Passion River Films (US); Activator Marketing Company (TW)
- Release dates: May 9, 2018 (Los Angeles Asian Pacific Film Festival); October 19, 2018 (United States); December 14, 2018 (Taiwan)
- Running time: 99 minutes
- Countries: United States; Taiwan
- Language: English/Chinese

Late Life: The Chien-Ming Wang Story is a 2018 Taiwanese-American documentary film directed by Frank W Chen. The film follows the latter years of professional baseball pitcher Chien-Ming Wang, the first and only Taiwanese to be signed by the New York Yankees, as he struggles to make it back into the Major Leagues after a series of career-changing injuries. It is a story of a man who is unwilling to give up and unable to let go, as told by those closest to him, examining his roles as an international player, a father, a son, and a reluctant national icon.

The film premiered on May 9, 2018, at the 34th Annual Los Angeles Asian Pacific Film Festival (LAAPFF). It was featured at the 36th Annual Center for Asian American Media Festival (CAAMFest) in San Francisco on May 12, 2018; the 41st Asian American International Film Festival (AAIFF) in New York City on July 29, 2018; the 13th Annual Orlando Film Festival on October 24, 2018; the 22nd Annual Vancouver Asian Film Festival (VAFF) on November 3, 2018; and the 55th Annual Taipei Golden Horse Film Festival in November 2018. Late Life began a limited theatrical run in the United States in October 2018 and was released into Taiwanese theatres in December of the same year.

== Synopsis ==
The first and only Taiwanese player for the New York Yankees, Chien-Ming Wang held many titles: American League Wins Leader, World Series Champion, Olympian, one of Time’s 100 Most Influential People, and the “Pride of Taiwan.”

Armed with a sinker with “late life,” Wang was once was named New York Yankees’ starting pitcher for the inaugural game at New Yankee Stadium in 2009. But after an ankle injury, Wang was released from the Major League rosters. Cameras follow Wang through his workout routines and minor league pitstops as he mounts his comeback. He’s aided along the way by his agent, trainers, fans, and his family.

The burdens of being a national icon are also explored in the film. As the first all-star level Taiwanese athlete, Wang’s celebrated as a hero in his homeland. But the weight of his countrymen’s expectations is both a gift and a curse, driving him to succeed when he could have rested on his laurels. His story is ultimately an Asian parable, an uplifting chronicle of success through sheer determination and hard work.

== Production ==
Late Life: The Chien-Ming Wang Story was produced by WYC Motions, a company founded by Frank W Chen, in association with 408 Films. The film was co-produced by EBOS International and co-presented by Activator Marketing Company. Late Life was distributed by Passion River Films in the USA.

=== Development ===
Director Frank W Chen was introduced to Chien-Ming Wang through a mutual friend in 2013. They met for dinner after a Minor League game in Moosic, PA. After the meal, Chen watched Wang awkwardly contorting his 6-foot-4 frame into his small rental car. “That image struck me,” said Chen, “For me, he was still a national icon, but he [was still having] to endure all of these lonely Minor League stints just to try to get back to where he thought he belonged. That became the impetus for the movie.”

Chien-Ming Wang initially declined to participate in the film. He felt he needed to keep his focus on the game and trying to make it back to the big leagues. When the 2014 season ended and after further discussion with his agent Alan Chang, Wang realized the film had the potential to inspire new generations of ballplayers — including his own sons. He agreed to join the project in early 2015.

=== Filming ===
Documentary cameras followed Chien-Ming Wang over four years through 21 cities in three countries.

== Reception ==
=== Critical response ===
Late Life: The Chien-Ming Wang Story has generally received positively. It currently holds an 83% score on aggregator site Rotten Tomatoes.

Kevin Crust of the Los Angeles Times wrote, "Ultimately, it's an inspiring account of an elite athlete with the tenacity (and resources) to battle adversity and keep his dream alive."

Frank H. Wu of Film Inquiry wrote, "You don't need to be a baseball enthusiast to enjoy Late Life. Anyone who appreciates human drama will be rooting for Wang."

David Noh of Film Journal International reviewed the film, writing, "Possibly the most purely moving batter-up film since every dad's favorite male weepie, The Pride of the Yankees."

Roger Moore of Movie Nation wrote, "Sober and inspiring look at a faded New York Yankees star, The Pride of Taiwan, struggling through a years-long comeback."

Chelsea Lee of CAAMFest wrote that Director Frank W Chen provided "a unique look at the baseball through an Asian American lens to capture a narrative much grander than one of a Taiwanese baseball player in America, but rather a story of relentless resolve and love."

=== Awards and recognition ===
Late Life: The Chien-Ming Wang Story won the Audience Award for International Documentary Feature at the 34th Annual Los Angeles Asian Pacific Film Festival. The film was selected as a Centerpiece Presentation for the 41st Asian American International Film Festival in New York City. Late Life was nominated for Best Documentary award at the 55th Golden Horse Awards. The film won the People’s Choice Award for Best Overall Feature at the 22nd Vancouver Asian Film Festival.

Year	Nominee / work	Award	Result
2018	Late Life: The Chien-Ming Wang Story	Vancouver Asian Film Festival: People’s Choice Award for Best Overall Feature	Won
2018	Late Life: The Chien-Ming Wang Story	Golden Horse Film Festival: Golden Horse Award for Best Documentary	Nominated
2018	Late Life: The Chien-Ming Wang Story	Los Angeles Asian Pacific Film Festival: Audience Award for International Documentary Feature	Won
