= Attack Attack! (album) =

Studio album by Attack Attack!
- Released: June 8, 2010
- Recorded: January–February 2010
- Genre: Metalcore; electronicore; post-hardcore
- Length: 34:11; 59:51 (reissue)
- Label: Rise
- Producer: Joey Sturgis; John Feldmann (tracks 1 and 3 of reissue); Caleb Shomo (tracks 2 and 4 of reissue)

Attack Attack! chronology
Someday Came Suddenly (2008)	Attack Attack! (2010)	This Means War (2012)

Singles from Attack Attack!
- 1. "Sexual Man Chocolate" Released: May 16, 2010; 2. "Smokahontas" Released: May 25, 2010; 3. "Last Breath" Released: June 27, 2011

Deluxe edition
- Deluxe edition cover

Attack Attack! (released as Attack Attack! (US) in the UK) is the second studio album by American metalcore band Attack Attack! It was released on June 8, 2010, through Rise Records. It was produced by Joey Sturgis. The album was initially titled "Shazam!", but due to copyright issues, it was self-titled.

It is the first album to feature Caleb Shomo on lead vocals, replacing former lead vocalist Nick Barham who had replaced original lead vocalist Austin Carlile but had not recorded an album with the band. It is also the final album to include former clean vocalist and rhythm guitarist Johnny Franck.

It peaked at number 26 on the Billboard 200, as well as topping the Independent Albums chart and peaking within the Alternative, Rock, and Digital Album charts. It received mixed reviews from music critics, with praise generated around the album's heavier tracks and negativity directed toward the electronicore and electropop songs.

A deluxe reissue of the album was released on July 19, 2011, through Rise Records, which included four new tracks, two remixes, and two acoustic tracks. It was announced when the band premiered the bonus track and lead single, "Last Breath" on June 7, which was released for digital download on June 23, 2011.

== Background ==
On November 25, 2009, lead guitarist Andrew Whiting announced information about an upcoming album. He revealed that the band would be recording the album from January to February 2010. He also spoke about the album's lead single, "Sexual Man Chocolate", which came from a phrase he once said. In April 2010, drummer Andrew Wetzel confirmed that ten tracks would appear on the album. The album was initially titled Shazam, but due to copyright issues, it was self-titled. Wetzel felt that the name Shazam was "shitty" anyways and thought that the album being self-titled was a better idea.

The group toured with Breathe Carolina, I See Stars, Asking Alexandria, and Bury Tomorrow on the Artery Foundation Across The Nation Tour in March 2010. They headlined the This Is a Family Tour in November 2010 with support from Emmure, Pierce the Veil, In Fear and Faith, and Of Mice & Men. The band performed at Warped Tour in the summer of 2011. Following their appearance at Warped Tour, the band performed three additional tour dates.

== Composition ==
"Sexual Man Chocolate" was the first song written for the album and was written while the band was on Warped Tour. Caleb Shomo came up with the idea and is about "falling in and out with God," according to Johnny Franck. "Renob, Nevada" was a song written in five minutes by Franck and is about people who criticized the group "in really obnoxious ways." He also wanted to give an "old-school hardcore feel" to the track. "I Swear I'll Change" is one of Franck's favourite off the album because of its "eerie overtone" feel to it. The title came from a familiar excuse the band had heard before and is about how "you wish you didn't get to know people as well as you do," and seeing that person's faults, hoping they would change. "Smokahontas" is a song that blends dubstep, hardcore, metalcore, pop and dance-pop music and its title came from how the group wanted to "come up with funny [marijuana-related] names." Franck wrote the first 30 seconds of "Fumbles O'Brian" and showed Shomo it. The track was fully written the following day after he showed him.

Most of the album was recorded in drop-B tuning, with the exception of "A for Andrew", which was recorded in drop-A tuning, the song name inspired by Whiting wanting the entire album to be in drop-A, and "AC-130", which is in drop-G. The album features a two-minute breakdown from the track "AC-130". "Shut Your Mouth" features guest vocals from their friend McSwagger, and "Lonely" features Bury Tomorrow vocalist Jason Cameron. The latter track was originally going to be a love ballad, but ended up turning into an R&B ballad. The standard edition of the album was produced by Joey Sturgis, whereas "Pick a Side" and "All Alone" were produced by Shomo and "Last Breath" and "Criminal" were produced by John Feldmann from the deluxe edition.

== Release ==
The album was released on June 8, 2010, through Rise Records, after initially planning to be released on May 25. The album's lead single, "Sexual Man Chocolate" was released on May 16, 2010. Its second single, "Smokahontas", was released on May 25. A music video for the song was uploaded onto Rise's official YouTube on January 21, 2011, and has accumulated 17 million views to date.

A deluxe reissue of the album was released on July 19, 2011, through Rise Records, and features four bonus tracks, two remixes, and two acoustic tracks. The group posted a remix version of "Sexual Man Chocolate" in promotion for their 2011 Vans Warped Tour performance. The band premiered "Last Breath" on June 11, which appears on the deluxe edition of the album. It was released as a single on June 27, via iTunes. A day before the release of the re-issue, the band premiered "Criminal", via Bloody Disgusting.

== Critical reception ==
Professional ratings
Review scores
Source	Rating
AbsolutePunk	(25%)
AllMusic	2.5/5 stars
Alternative Press	3/5 stars
Kerrang!	1/5 stars
Rock Sound	6/10

Attack Attack! was met with mixed reviews from music critics. Gregory Heaney of AllMusic noted the band's experiment with electropop and metalcore stating, "While this hodgepodge is an interesting gimmick, the elements never feel like they come together in any kind of harmony, making the electronic work feel more like an ironic wink than an earnest attempt to fuse two disparate styles together." He also pointed out how not much has changed in their sound from debut studio album, Someday Came Suddenly. Scott Heisel of Alternative Press praised Shomo's vocals on the album, as well as the song "Sexual Man Chocolate", comparing it to Chiodos' Bone Palace Ballet. However, he criticized the "unbelievably terrible attempts to incorporate electro-pop." Chris Hidden of Rock Sound remarked, "The potentially chart-bothering sparkly disco-pop of the likes of 'Shut Your Mouth' and 'AC-130' offer a refreshing diversion from the textbook set of belligerent riffs and breakdowns seen on the likes of 'Renob, Nevada'." He ended the review stating, "Attack Attack! should be encouraged for seeking to reinvent the hitherto deeply stale metalcore genre, even if their particular results are a little mixed."

A negative review came from Thomas Nassiff of AbsolutePunk.net, who criticized the predictability of the album. Calling it "one of the worst records," he added, "The bare-bones structure of Attack Attack!'s sound is back, featuring high-pitched vocals to the point that dogs everywhere bark in suffering, metal breakdowns, and autotuned, synth-laden dance portions. It's safe to say that they haven't gotten any better or worse at what they do." Zach Shaw of Metal Insider simply remarked, "Crabcore reached this high on the charts? Indeed a sad day."

== Commercial performance ==
Attack Attack peaked at number 27 on the Billboard 200, selling more than 15,000 copies in its first week. The album also topped the Billboard Independent Albums chart, as well as charting on the US Top Alternative Albums chart, Top Rock Albums chart and Digital Albums chart at number five, six and 14 respectively.

== Track listing ==
Standard edition
No.	Title	Length
1.	"Sexual Man Chocolate"	3:17
2.	"Renob, Nevada"	3:13
3.	"I Swear I'll Change"	3:40
4.	"Shut Your Mouth" (featuring McSwagger)	2:43
5.	"A for Andrew"	3:22
6.	"Smokahontas"	3:54
7.	"AC-130"	1:47
8.	"Fumbles O'Brian"	2:57
9.	"Turbo Swag"	3:33
10.	"Lonely" (featuring Jason Cameron of Bury Tomorrow) (features an untitled instrumental hidden track that starts at 4:07)	5:37
Total length:		34:11

Deluxe edition (re-issue)
No.	Title	Length
1.	"Last Breath" (bonus track)	3:43
2.	"Pick a Side" (bonus track)	2:41
3.	"Criminal" (bonus track)	3:20
4.	"All Alone" (bonus track)	4:01
5.	"Sexual Man Chocolate"	3:17
6.	"Renob, Nevada"	3:13
7.	"I Swear I'll Change"	3:40
8.	"Shut Your Mouth" (featuring McSwagger)	2:43
9.	"A for Andrew"	3:22
10.	"Smokahontas"	3:56
11.	"AC-130"	1:47
12.	"Fumbles O'Brian"	2:57
13.	"Turbo Swag"	3:33
14.	"Lonely" (featuring Jason Cameron of Bury Tomorrow) (features an untitled instrumental hidden track that starts at 4:07)	5:40
15.	"Sexual Man Chocolate" (remix) (bonus track)	2:53
16.	"AC-130" (remix) (bonus track)	2:44
17.	"I Swear I'll Change" (acoustic version) (bonus track)	3:08
18.	"Turbo Swag" (acoustic version) (bonus track)	3:06
Total length:		59:51

== Personnel ==
Credits adapted from album's liner notes.

Attack Attack!

- Johnny Franck – clean vocals, guitars (all tracks of original; 5–16 of the re-issue)
- John Holgado – bass guitar
- Caleb Shomo – lead vocals, programming, keyboards, synthesizers
- Andrew Wetzel – drums
- Andrew Whiting – guitars

Production

- Joey Sturgis – production, engineered, mastering, mixing
- Eric Rushing – management
- Dave Shapiro – booking
- Caleb Shomo – production
- Doug Cunningham – artwork

Deluxe edition production

- John Feldmann – production, engineered, mastering, mixing, co-writing on tracks "Last Breath" and "Criminal"
- Caleb Shomo – production, engineered, mastering, mixing on tracks "Pick a Side" and "All Alone"
- Glenn Thomas – design
- Steven Taylor – photography

== Charts ==
Chart performance for Attack Attack!
Chart (2010)	Peak position
US Billboard 200	27
US Independent Albums (Billboard)	1
US Top Alternative Albums (Billboard)	5
US Top Rock Albums (Billboard)	6
