= Nine Shrines =

American rock band

- Origin: Columbus, Ohio, U.S.
- Genres: Hard rock; metalcore; post-grunge
- Years active: 2014–Present
- Labels: Mascot Records
- Members: Andrew Wetzel; Andrew Baylis; Chris Parketny; Evan McKeever; Devon Voisine
- Past members: Sam Sky
- Website: nineshrines.com

Nine Shrines is an American rock band from Ohio formed in 2014. The band was formed by former Attack Attack! drummer Andrew Wetzel after the group's disbandment in 2013, and includes two members of the now disbanded group Life on Repeat – bassist Devon Voisine and lead guitarist Andrew Baylis – as well as vocalist Chris Parketny formerly of Strangers to Wolves, and rhythm guitarist Evan McKeever of Downplay. They are currently signed to Mascot Records.

== History ==
After the breakup of Attack Attack!, drummer Andrew Wetzel, though initially apprehensive, decided to pursue a new band after being put in contact with guitarist Andrew Baylis through a mutual friend. In 2014, they announced the new project initially with Devon Voisine on bass and Sam Sky as lead vocalist, though Sky was replaced in July 2015 with current vocalist Chris Parketny and guitarist Evan McKeever.

After the band's lineup was solidified in 2017, they began work on their self-produced debut EP, Misery. The work's main themes revolve around the bitterness of the group's past experiences and breakups within the music industry, with the album artwork depicting the band "having the soul sucked out of them." The EP was released on April 7, 2017, and was preceded by the lead single "King of Mercy", which had crossed 1 million Spotify streams by February 2018. The band toured with Hinder and Nonpoint in support of "Misery" across the United States in April and May 2017.

In a Mascot Records' press release on May 31, 2018, it was announced that the band was in the studio with producer Dan Korneff working on their debut full-length LP. The album, titled Retribution Therapy was released in 2019.

== Discography ==
Studio albums

- Retribution Therapy (2019)

EPs

- Misery (2017)

Singles

- Friends in Low Places (2015)
