= 5 Seconds of Summer discography =

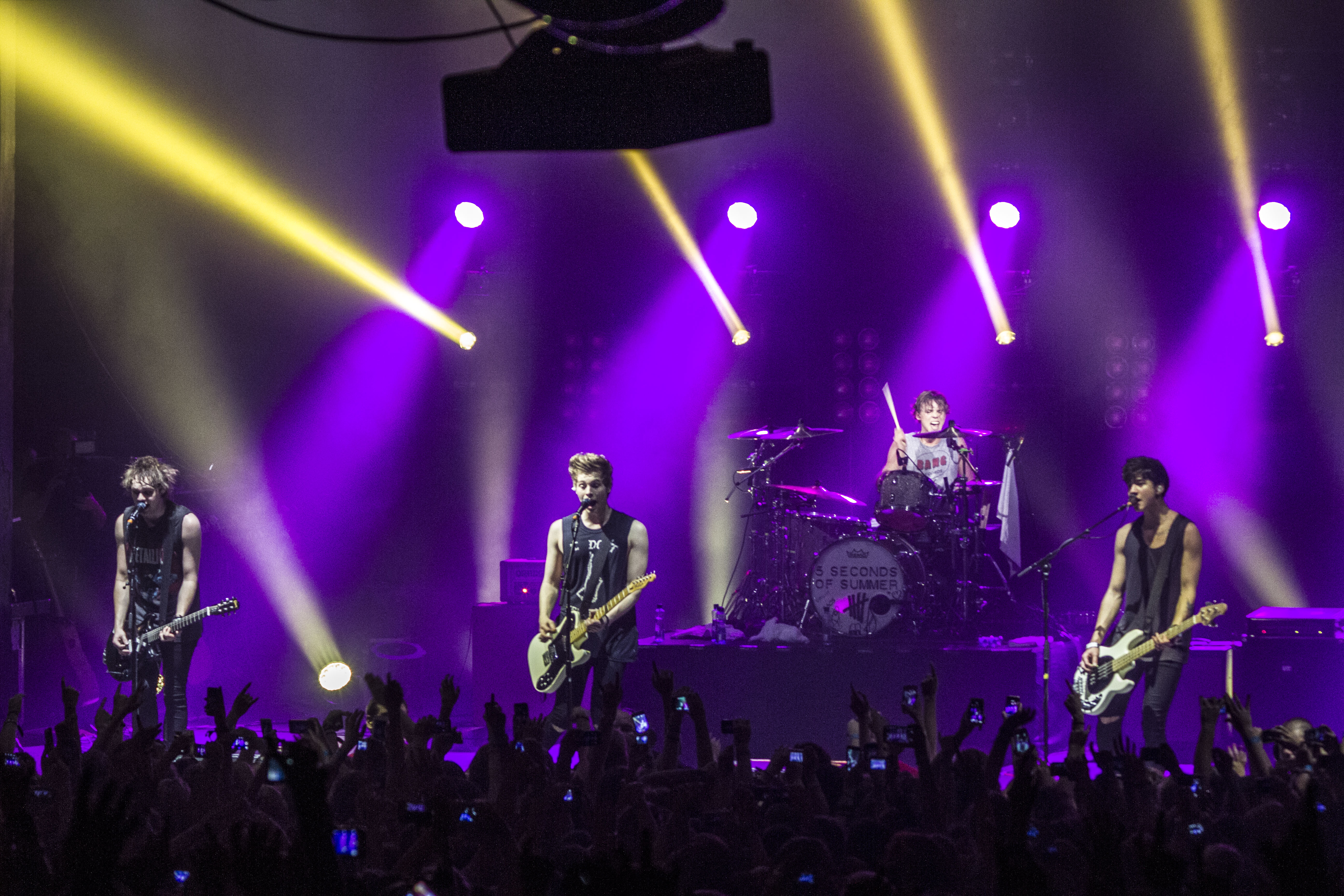
- 5 Seconds of Summer performing at the Enmore Theatre in Sydney, Australia on 30 April 2014
- Studio albums: 6
- EPs: 8
- Live albums: 3
- Singles: 34
- B-sides: 7
- Music videos: 34
- Promotional singles: 5
- Video albums: 1

Australian pop rock band 5 Seconds of Summer have released six studio albums, three live albums, eight extended plays, 34 singles, four promotional singles, one video album, and 35 music videos. All six of their studio albums debuted at number one in Australia and all have debuted at number one, within the top three, and within top 10 on a multitude of charts in many other countries. According to Billboard, since 2014, 5 Seconds of Summer have sold more than ten million albums, sold over two million concert tickets worldwide, and the band's songs streams surpass seven billion, making them one of Australia's most successful musical exports in history.

On 5 February 2014, 5 Seconds of Summer's debut single "She Looks So Perfect" was released. It debuted at number one in four countries, including the United Kingdom, where 5 Seconds of Summer became the fourth Australian band to top the UK Singles Chart and the first since "Don't Call Me Baby" by Madison Avenue in May 2000. On 13 May 2014, the band announced their debut album, named 5 Seconds of Summer, which was released on 22 July 2014. It debuted at number one in Australia and the US. On 23 October 2015, the band released their second album Sounds Good Feels Good. The album peaked at number one in the charts of ten countries, including Australia, Canada, Ireland, the UK and the US. The band released "Jet Black Heart" as the third and final single from the album. It peaked at number thirty-four in Australia, number sixty in the UK, number seventy-eight in Ireland and number ninety-five in the US.

On 22 February 2018, the band released "Want You Back", the lead single from their third studio album. It peaked within the top 40 of the charts in the United Kingdom, Ireland, and Australia. The second single was "Youngblood", which reached worldwide success and peaked at number one for eight consecutive weeks in Australia and four consecutive weeks in New Zealand. On 19 June 2018, the band released their third studio album Youngblood. The album was a commercial success and debuted at number one in Australia and the US. On 27 March 2020, the band released their fourth studio album Calm which was a commercial success and received generally positive reviews from critics. The album charted in more than 25 countries on several charts, and debuted atop the charts at number one in Australia and the United Kingdom. The album peaked in the top 10 on 17 charts, including number two in Mexico and number four in Austria, Estonia, Ireland, New Zealand and Portugal.

All singles from the band's four studio albums, as well as all four albums, have charted in a substantial number of countries, received multiple official sales certifications and have been featured in a large amount of weekly and year-end charts, as well as making an appearance on decade-end charts.

== Albums ==
=== Studio albums ===
Title	Details	Peak chart positions										Sales	Certifications
Title	Details	AUS	BEL	CAN	DEN	FRA	IRE	NL	NZ	UK	US	Sales	Certifications
5 Seconds of Summer	Released: 27 June 2014; Label: Capitol; Format: CD, DL, streaming	1	1	1	1	4	1	1	1	2	1	UK: 240,664; US: 734,000; WW: 4,100,000	ARIA: 2× Platinum; BPI: Platinum; IFPI DEN: Gold; MC: Platinum; RIAA: Platinum; RMNZ: Gold
Sounds Good Feels Good	Released: 23 October 2015; Label: Capitol; Format: CD, DL, LP, streaming	1	2	1	3	12	1	1	2	1	1	US: 496,000; WW: 1,000,000	ARIA: Gold; BPI: Gold; RIAA: Gold
Youngblood	Released: 19 June 2018; Label: Capitol; Format: CD, DL, LP, streaming	1	3	3	7	43	3	2	2	3	1	US: 700,000	ARIA: Gold; BPI: Gold; IFPI DEN: Platinum; MC: Platinum; RIAA: Platinum
Calm	Released: 27 March 2020; Label: Interscope; Format: CD, DL, LP, streaming, cassette	1	7	7	22	42	4	5	4	1	2	US: 113,000	ARIA: Gold; BPI: Gold
5SOS5	Released: 23 September 2022; Label: BMG; Format: CD, DL, LP, streaming, cassette	1	5	3	32	56	12	1	3	1	2	US: 36,000	
Everyone's a Star!	Released: 14 November 2025; Label: Republic; Format: CD, DL, LP, streaming, cassette	1	4	93	—	45	8	1	5	1	6		
"—" denotes an album that did not chart or was not released.

=== Live albums ===
Title	Details	Peak chart positions								Sales
Title	Details	AUS	BEL	FRA	IRE	NL	NZ	UK	US	Sales
LiveSOS	Released: 15 December 2014; Format: CD, digital download	7	41	135	20	26	23	31	13	US: 66,541
Meet You There Tour Live	Released: 21 December 2018; Format: Digital download, vinyl, streaming	— (Note: Meet You There Tour Live did not enter the ARIA Albums Chart, but peaked at number 41 on the ARIA Digital Album Chart.)	—	—	—	—	—	— (Note: Meet You There Tour Live did not enter the UK Albums Chart, but peaked at number 88 on the UK Album Downloads Chart.)	—	
The Feeling of Falling Upwards (Live from The Royal Albert Hall)	Released: 14 April 2023; Format: Digital download, streaming	34	—	—	—	—	—	—	— (Note: The Feeling of Falling Upwards did not enter the Billboard 200, but peaked at number 25 on the US Billboard Top Current Albums Sales component chart.)	
"—" denotes an album that did not chart or was not released.

=== Video albums ===
List of video albums, with selected chart positions and certifications
Title	Details	Peak chart positions			Certifications
Title	Details	AUS Video	UK Video	US Video	Certifications
How Did We End Up Here: Live at Wembley Arena	Released: 20 November 2015; Label: Capitol Records; Formats: DVD	1	77	1	ARIA: Gold

== Extended plays ==
Title	Details	Peak chart positions				Sales	Certifications
Title	Details	CAN	NZ	UK	US	Sales	Certifications
Unplugged	Released: 26 June 2012; Format: Digital download	—	—	—	—		
Somewhere New	Released: 7 December 2012; Format: CD, digital download	—	36	— (Note: Somewhere New did not enter the UK Albums Chart, but peaked at number five on the UK Physical Singles chart.)	— (Note: Somewhere New did not enter the Billboard 200, but peaked at number 97 on the US Billboard Top Current Albums Sales component chart.)		ARIA: Gold
She Looks So Perfect	Released: 23 March 2014; Format: CD, digital download	1	—	—	2	US: 316,000	
Don't Stop	Released: 9 May 2014; Format: CD, digital download	—	—	—	—		
Amnesia	Released: 15 July 2014; Format: CD, digital download	—	—	—	—		
Good Girls	Released: 17 November 2014; Format: CD, digital download	—	—	—	—		
She's Kinda Hot	Released: 28 August 2015; Format: CD, digital download	—	—	—	—		
Spotify Singles	Released: 1 August 2018; Format: Digital download	—	—	—	—		
ClubSOS Vol 1	Released: 30 October 2026; Format: Digital download, streaming	—	—	—	—		
"—" denotes an album that did not chart or was not released.

== Singles ==
=== As lead artists ===
Title	Year	Peak chart positions										Sales	Certifications	Album
Title	Year	AUS	BEL	CAN	DEN	FRA	IRE	NL	NZ	UK	US	Sales	Certifications	Album
"Out of My Limit" (Note: "Out of My Limit" was only released in Australia and New Zealand.)	2012	—	—	—	—	—	—	—	—	—	—			Somewhere New EP
"She Looks So Perfect"	2014	1	20	25	12	40	1	13	1	1	24	US: 925,000	ARIA: 8× Platinum; BPI: 2× Platinum; IFPI DEN: Gold; MC: Platinum; RIAA: 2× Platinum; RMNZ: 2× Platinum	5 Seconds of Summer
"Don't Stop"	2014	3	16	34	18	63	1	25	1	2	47	UK: 80,022	ARIA: 2× Platinum; BPI: Platinum; RIAA: Gold; RMNZ: Gold	5 Seconds of Summer
"Amnesia"	2014	7	21	19	6	54	3	28	6	7	16	US: 729,000	ARIA: 5× Platinum; BPI: Platinum; IFPI DEN: Gold; MC: Gold; RIAA: 2× Platinum; RMNZ: Platinum	5 Seconds of Summer
"Good Girls"	2014	19	40	27	18	97	12	88	15	19	34		ARIA: Platinum; BPI: Silver; RIAA: Platinum	5 Seconds of Summer
"What I Like About You"	2014	—	— (Note: "What I Like About You" peaked at number 76 on the Flanders Ultratip chart.)	—	—	—	—	—	—	137	—		ARIA: Gold	LiveSOS
"She's Kinda Hot"	2015	6	46	27	—	62	7	57	11	14	22	US: 124,000	ARIA: Platinum; BPI: Silver; RIAA: Platinum; RMNZ: Gold	Sounds Good Feels Good
"Hey Everybody!"	2015	70	— (Note: "Hey Everybody!" peaked at number 12 on the Flanders Ultratip chart.)	—	—	—	49	—	—	49	— (Note: "Hey Everybody!" did not enter the Billboard Hot 100, but peaked at number 16 on the Bubbling Under Hot 100 chart.)			Sounds Good Feels Good
"Jet Black Heart"	2015	34	—	—	—	152	78	98	—	60	95		ARIA: Gold	Sounds Good Feels Good
"Girls Talk Boys"	2016	21	— (Note: "Girls Talk Boys" peaked at number 45 on the Flanders Ultratip chart.)	87	—	35	39	81	— (Note: "Girls Talk Boys" did not enter the NZ Top 40 Singles Chart, but peaked at number 1 on the NZ Heatseeker Singles Chart.)	28	68		ARIA: Gold	Ghostbusters
"Want You Back"	2018	32	— (Note: "Want You Back" peaked at number four on the Flanders Ultratip chart.)	57	—	82	26	—	— (Note: "Want You Back" did not enter the NZ Top 40 Singles Chart, but peaked at number one on the NZ Heatseeker Singles Chart.)	22	61		ARIA: Platinum; BPI: Silver; MC: Gold; RIAA: Gold; RMNZ: Gold	Youngblood
"Youngblood"	2018	1	5	3	2	110	4	7	1	4	7		ARIA: 18× Platinum; BEA: Platinum; BPI: 3× Platinum; IFPI DEN: 3× Platinum; MC: Platinum; RIAA: 6× Platinum; RMNZ: 7× Platinum; SNEP: Gold	Youngblood
"Valentine"	2018	85	— (Note: "Valentine" peaked at number 19 on the Flanders Ultratip chart.)	—	—	—	—	—	— (Note: "Valentine" did not enter the NZ Top 40 Singles Chart, but peaked at number four on the NZ Heatseeker Singles Chart.)	—	—		ARIA: Gold; RMNZ: Gold	Youngblood
"Killer Queen"	2018	—	—	—	—	—	—	—	— (Note: "Killer Queen" did not enter the NZ Top 40 Singles Chart, but peaked at number 18 on the NZ Heatseeker Singles Chart.)	—	—			Non-album single
"Lie to Me" (featuring Julia Michaels)	2018	38	—	—	—	—	42	—	— (Note: "Lie to Me" did not enter the NZ Top 40 Singles Chart, but peaked at number 9 on the NZ Hot Singles Chart.)	—	—		ARIA: 3× Platinum; BPI: Silver; MC: Gold; RMNZ: Platinum	Youngblood
"Easier" (original or remix with Charlie Puth)	2019	12	48	37	25	—	25	66	16	27	48		ARIA: 3× Platinum; BPI: Gold; IFPI DEN: Gold; MC: Platinum; RIAA: Platinum; RMNZ: Platinum	Calm
"Teeth" (Note: "Teeth" also appears on the soundtrack to 13 Reasons Why: Season 3.)	2019	15	— (Note: "Teeth" peaked at number two on the Flanders Ultratip chart.)	63	38	—	42	31	25	46	— (Note: "Teeth" did not enter the Billboard Hot 100, but peaked at number four on the Bubbling Under Hot 100 chart.)		ARIA: 5× Platinum; BPI: Platinum; MC: Gold; RIAA: Gold; RMNZ: 2× Platinum	Calm
"No Shame"	2020	63	— (Note: "No Shame" peaked at number 33 on the Flanders Ultratip chart.)	—	—	—	56	—	— (Note: "No Shame" did not enter the NZ Top 40 Singles Chart, but peaked at number six on the NZ Hot Singles Chart.)	68	— (Note: "No Shame" did not enter the Billboard Hot 100, but peaked at number twelve on the Bubbling Under Hot 100 chart.)		ARIA: Gold	Calm
"Old Me"	2020	39	50	—	—	—	70	29	— (Note: "Old Me" did not enter the NZ Top 40 Singles Chart, but peaked at number three on the NZ Hot Singles Chart.)	— (Note: "Old Me" did not enter the UK Singles Chart, but peaked at number 94 on the UK Singles Downloads Chart.)	— (Note: "Old Me" did not enter the Billboard Hot 100, but peaked at number five on the Bubbling Under Hot 100 chart.)		ARIA: Platinum; MC: Gold	Calm
"Wildflower"	2020	80	—	—	—	—	80	—	— (Note: "Wildflower" did not enter the NZ Top 40 Singles Chart, but peaked at number eight on the NZ Hot Singles Chart.)	81	—		ARIA: Gold	Calm
"2011"	2021	— (Note: "2011" did not enter the ARIA Top 100 Singles Chart, but peaked at number 4 on the Australian Independent Label Singles.)	—	—	—	—	—	—	— (Note: "2011" did not enter the NZ Top 40 Singles Chart, but peaked at number 12 on the NZ Hot Singles Chart.)	—	—			Non-album single
"Complete Mess"	2022	— (Note: "Complete Mess" did not enter the ARIA Top 100 Singles Chart, but peaked at number 2 on the Australian Independent Label Singles.)	—	—	—	—	—	71	— (Note: "Complete Mess" did not enter the NZ Top 40 Singles Chart, but peaked at number 12 on the NZ Hot Singles Chart.)	— (Note: "Complete Mess" did not enter the UK Singles Chart, but peaked at number 53 on the UK Singles Downloads Chart.)	85			5SOS5
"Take My Hand"	2022	— (Note: "Take My Hand" did not enter the ARIA Top 100 Singles Chart, but peaked at number 5 on the Australian Independent Label Singles.)	—	—	—	—	72	—	— (Note: "Take My Hand" did not enter the NZ Top 40 Singles Chart, but peaked at number 12 on the NZ Hot Singles Chart.)	— (Note: "Take My Hand" did not enter the UK Singles Chart, but peaked at number 54 on the UK Singles Downloads Chart.)	—			5SOS5
"Me Myself & I"	2022	90	29	—	—	—	—	—	— (Note: "Me Myself & I" did not enter the NZ Top 40 Singles Chart, but peaked at number 13 on the NZ Hot Singles Chart.)	—	—			5SOS5
"Blender"	2022	—	—	—	—	—	—	—	— (Note: "Blender" did not enter the NZ Top 40 Singles Chart, but peaked at number 23 on the NZ Hot Singles Chart.)	—	—			5SOS5
"Older" (featuring Sierra Deaton)	2022	—	—	—	—	—	—	—	—	—	—			5SOS5
"Lighter" (with Galantis and David Guetta)	2024	99	28	—	—	—	—	78	— (Note: "Lighter" did not enter the NZ Top 40 Singles Chart, but peaked at number seven on the NZ Hot Singles Chart.)	78	—			Rx
"Not OK"	2025	— (Note: "Not OK" did not enter the ARIA Top 100 Singles Chart, but peaked at number three on the ARIA Top 9 Australian Artist Singles Chart.)	—	—	—	—	—	—	— (Note: "Not OK" did not enter the NZ Top 40 Singles Chart, but peaked at number 12 on the NZ Hot Singles Chart.)	—	—			Everyone's a Star!
"Boyband"	2025	—	—	—	—	—	—	—	— (Note: "Boyband" did not enter the NZ Top 40 Singles Chart, but peaked at number 24 on the NZ Hot Singles Chart.)	—	—			Everyone's a Star!
"Telephone Busy"	2025	— (Note: "Telephone Busy" did not enter the Australian top 100 Singles Chart, but peaked at number 18 on Australian Artist Chart.)	—	—	—	—	—	—	— (Note: "Telephone Busy" did not enter the NZ Top 40 Singles Chart, but peaked at number 23 on the NZ Hot Singles Chart.)	—	—			Everyone's a Star!
"Everyone's a Star"	2025	—	—	—	—	—	—	—	— (Note: "Everyone's a Star" did not enter the NZ Top 40 Singles Chart, but peaked at number 10 on the NZ Hot Singles Chart.)	—	—			Everyone's a Star!
"Evolve" (ClubSOS)	2026	—	—	—	—	—	—	—	—	—	—			ClubSOS Vol 1
"Telephone Busy" (ClubSOS)	2026	—	—	—	—	—	—	—	— (Note: "Telephone Busy" (ClubSOS) did not enter the NZ Top 40 Singles Chart, but it peaked at number 27 on the NZ Hot Singles Chart.)	—	—			ClubSOS Vol 1
"—" denotes a single that did not chart or was not released.

=== As featured artists ===
Title	Year	Peak chart positions									Certifications	Album
Title	Year	AUS	BEL	CAN	IRE	NL	NZ	POR	UK	US	Certifications	Album
"Who Do You Love" (The Chainsmokers featuring 5 Seconds of Summer)	2019	13	21	31	19	52	26	67	34	52	ARIA: 2× Platinum; BPI: Gold; MC: 2× Platinum; RIAA: 2× Platinum; RMNZ: Platinum	World War Joy
"Times Like These" (as part of Live Lounge Allstars)	2020	—	91	—	64	—	—	—	1	—		Non-album single
"—" denotes a single that did not chart or was not released.

=== Promotional singles ===
Title	Year	Peak chart positions										Album
Title	Year	AUS	BEL	CAN	DEN	FRA	IRE	NL	NZ	UK	US	Album
"Kiss Me Kiss Me"	2014	14	29	26	7	62	54	37	10	110	28	5 Seconds of Summer
"Everything I Didn't Say"	2014	11	31	18	8	59	97	36	8	130	24	5 Seconds of Summer
"Fly Away"	2015	26	—	84	—	138	6	—	—	44	100	Sounds Good Feels Good
"Money"	2015	69	—	—	—	—	—	—	—	88	—	Sounds Good Feels Good
"Bad Omens"	2022	—	—	—	—	—	—	—	— (Note: "Bad Omens" did not enter the NZ Top 40 Singles Chart, but peaked at number nine on the NZ Hot Singles Chart.)	—	—	5SOS5
"—" denotes a single that did not chart or was not released.

== Other charted or certified songs ==
Title	Year	Peak chart positions						Certifications	Album
Title	Year	AUS	IRE	NZ Hot	SCO	UK	US	Certifications	Album
"Heartache on the Big Screen"	2014	—	—	—	94	123	—		She Looks So Perfect (EP)
"The Only Reason"	2014	—	—	—	—	143	—		She Looks So Perfect (EP)
"Wrapped Around Your Finger"	2014	—	77	—	—	119	—		Don't Stop (EP)
"Rejects"	2014	—	78	—	90	108	—		Don't Stop (EP)
"Try Hard"	2014	—	79	—	66	80	—		Don't Stop (EP)
"Heartbreak Girl"	2014	—	42	—	64	108	—		5 Seconds of Summer
"18"	2014	—	45	—	73	127	—		5 Seconds of Summer
"Greenlight"	2014	—	53	—	78	169	—		5 Seconds of Summer
"Voodoo Doll"	2014	—	55	—	76	128	—		5 Seconds of Summer
"Beside You"	2014	—	56	—	70	129	—		5 Seconds of Summer
"Long Way Home"	2014	—	58	—	91	148	—		5 Seconds of Summer
"English Love Affair"	2014	—	61	—	—	142	—	BPI: Silver	5 Seconds of Summer
"End Up Here"	2014	—	65	—	—	170	—		5 Seconds of Summer
"Never Be"	2014	—	67	—	98	162	—		5 Seconds of Summer
"Social Casualty"	2014	—	68	—	97	157	—		5 Seconds of Summer
"Daylight"	2014	61	—	—	63	109	— (Note: "Daylight" did not enter the Billboard Hot 100 but peaked at number 20 on the Bubbling Under Hot 100 chart.)		Amnesia (EP)
"American Idiot"	2014	89	—	—	—	—	—		Amnesia (EP)
"Just Saying"	2014	54	—	—	69	133	— (Note: "Just Saying" did not enter the Billboard Hot 100 but peaked at number 15 on the Bubbling Under Hot 100 chart.)		Good Girls (EP)
"Broken Home"	2015	—	—	—	—	165	—		Sounds Good Feels Good
"Catch Fire"	2015	—	—	—	—	177	—		Sounds Good Feels Good
"Permanent Vacation"	2015	—	—	—	—	140	—		Sounds Good Feels Good
"Lie to Me" (solo version)	2018	—	—	— (Note: "Lie to Me" did not enter the NZ Top 40 or Hot Singles Chart, but peaked at number six on the NZ Heatseeker Singles Chart.)	—	99	—	ARIA: Platinum; BPI: Silver; MC: Gold	Youngblood
"Ghost of You"	2018	—	—	—	—	— (Note: "Ghost of You" did not enter the UK Singles Chart, but peaked at number 66 on the UK Singles Sales Chart.)	—	ARIA: Platinum; BPI: Silver; RIAA: Gold; RMNZ: Gold	Youngblood
"Red Desert"	2020	—	—	17	—	—	—		Calm
"Best Years"	2020	—	—	22	—	—	—		Calm
"Not in the Same Way"	2020	—	—	20	—	—	—		Calm
"Kill My Time"	2020	—	—	24	—	—	—		Calm
"Easy for You to Say"	2022	—	—	34	—	—	—		5SOS5
"You Don't Go to Parties"	2022	—	—	39	—	—	—		5SOS5
"Everyone's a Star!"	2025	—	—	10	—	—	—		Everyone's a Star!
"No. 1 Obsession"	2025	—	—	28	—	—	—		Everyone's a Star!
"I'm Scared I'll Never Sleep Again"	2025	—	—	27	—	—	—		Everyone's a Star!
"Istillfeelthesame"	2025	—	—	32	—	—	—		Everyone's a Star!
"—" denotes a song that did not chart or was not released.

== Other appearances ==
Title	Year	Album
"American Idiot"	2014	Kerrang! Does Green Day's American Idiot
"Hearts Upon Our Sleeve" (featuring Scott Mills)	2014	—N/a
"Take What You Want" (One Ok Rock featuring 5 Seconds of Summer)	2017	Ambitions
"Youngblood"	2018	BBC Radio 1's Live Lounge 2018
"No Roots"	2018	BBC Radio 1's Live Lounge 2018
"Drown"	2018	BBC Radio 1's Live Lounge 2018
"Youngblood (Live)"	2020	Artists Unite for Fire Fight

== Music videos ==
Title	Year	Director
"Out of My Limit"	2012	Bryce Jepsen
"Heartbreak Girl"	2013	Charlie Miller
"Try Hard"	2013	Ben Winston
"Wherever You Are"	2013	Ben Winston
"She Looks So Perfect"	2014	Frank Borin
"Don't Stop"	2014	Isaac Rentz
"Voodoo Doll (One Mic, One Take)"	2014	
"Amnesia"	2014	Isaac Rentz
"Good Girls"	2014	Isaac Rentz
"What I Like About You: Live at The Forum"	2014	Tom van Schelven
"She's Kinda Hot"	2015	Isaac Rentz
"Hey Everybody!"	2015	Isaac Rentz
"Jet Black Heart"	2015	Isaac Rentz
"Girls Talk Boys"	2016	Isaac Rentz
"Want You Back"	2018	James Larese
"Youngblood" (Alt version)	2018	Conor Butler
"Youngblood"	2018	Frank & Ivanna Borin
"Valentine"	2018	Andy DeLuca & Ashton Irwin
"Lie To Me"	2018	Brendan Vaughan
"Easier"	2019	Grant Singer
"Easier" (Live From the Vault)	2019	Jade Ehlers
"Teeth"	2019	Thibaut Duverneix
"Teeth" (Live From the Vault)	2019	Thibaut Duverneix
"No Shame"	2020	Hannah Lux Davis
"Old Me"	2020	Hannah Lux Davis
"Wildflower"	2020	Andy DeLuca
"Complete Mess"	2022	Lauren Dunn
"Me Myself & I"	2022	Harry Law
"Blender"	2022	Ryan Fleming
"Older"	2022	Frank & Ivanna Borin
"Bad Omens"	2022	Danny Mitri & Alyona Shchasnaia
"Not OK"	2025	Unknown
"Boyband"	2025	Unknown
"Telephone Busy"	2025	Frank Borin
"Everyone's a Star"	2025	
