= List of awards and nominations received by 5 Seconds of Summer =

5 Seconds of Summer awards and nominations
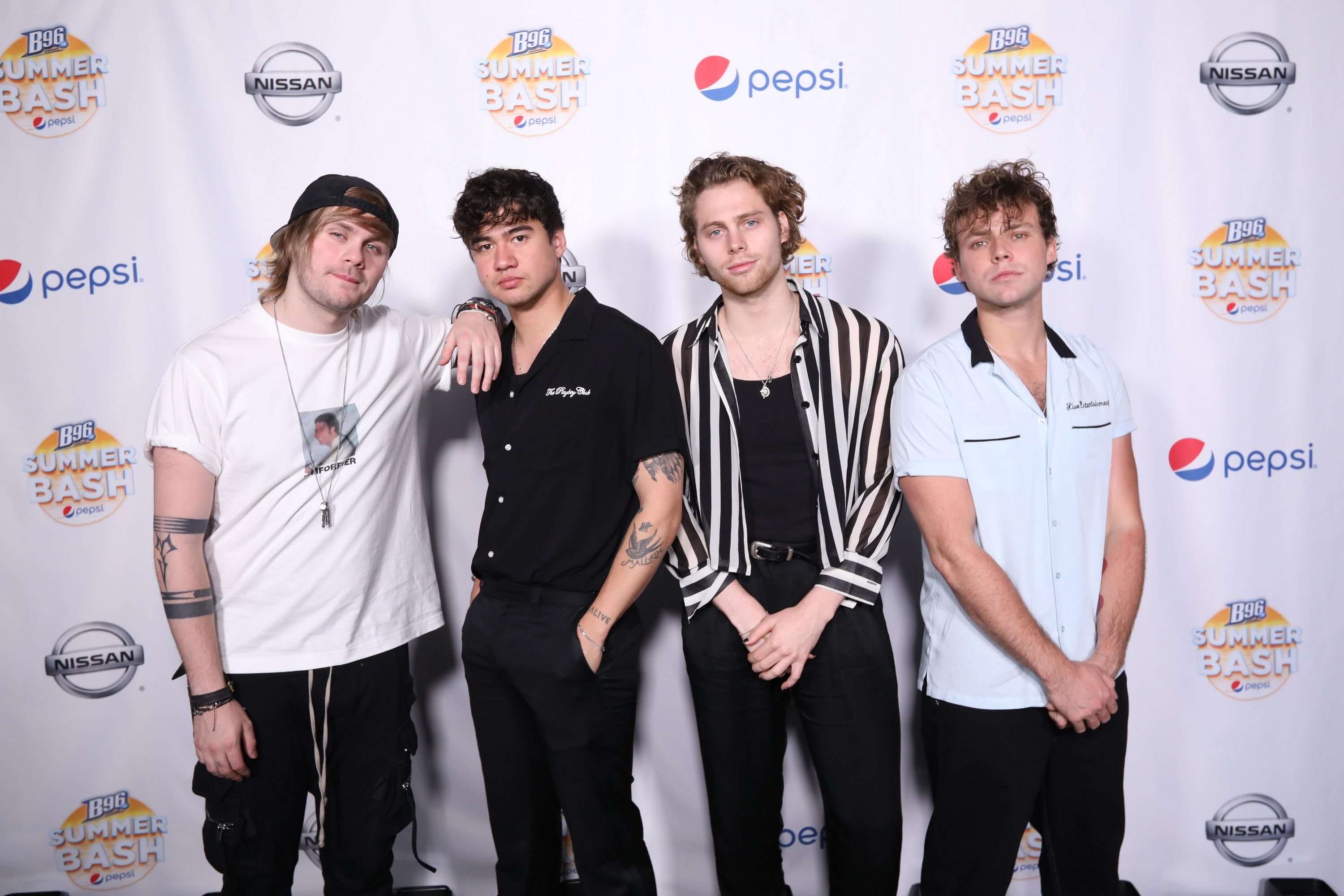
- 5 Seconds of Summer at B96 Summerbash 2018. From left to right: Michael Clifford, Calum Hood, Luke Hemmings and Ashton Irwin.
Awards and nominations
Award	Wins	Nominations
4Music	1	1
Alternative Press Music Awards	1	1
American Music Awards	1	1
Australian Music Prize	0	1
APRA Awards (Australia)	2	5
ARIA Music Awards	5	12
ASCAP Awards	1	1
BBC Radio 1 Teen Awards	1	1
Billboard Music Awards	0	4
BMI Awards	3	3
Brit Awards	0	1
Channel V	2	2
GAFFA Awards (Denmark)	0	3
Global Awards	0	3
iHeartRadio MMVAs	2	3
iHeartRadio Music Awards	3	5
Kerrang! Awards	1	1
Meus Prêmios Nick	0	1
MTV Europe Music Awards	10	14
MTV Italian Music Awards	0	5
MTV Spain Song of the Summer	1	1
MTV (UK)	3	3
MTV Video Music Award	2	7
Myx Music Award	0	2
Neox Fan Awards	0	1
Nickelodeon Kids' Choice Awards	6	8
NME Awards	3	3
People's Choice Awards	1	2
Radio Disney Music Awards	0	2
Rockbjörnen	0	1
Rock Sound Readers' Poll	2	4
Rollers Music Awards	0	3
Shorty Awards	0	3
Teen Choice Awards	8	22
Telehit Awards	3	5
World Music Awards	0	6
Young Hollywood Awards	0	1
YouTube Creator Awards	2	2

Totals (Note: Certain award groups do not simply award one winner. They acknowledge several different recipients, have runners-up, and have third place. Since this is a specific recognition and is different from losing an award, runner-up mentions are considered wins in this award tally. For simplification and to avoid errors, each award in this list has been presumed to have had a prior nomination.)
- Wins: 78
- Nominations: 158

5 Seconds of Summer, also known as 5SOS, are an Australian pop rock band formed in 2011 in Sydney, Australia. The group consists of lead vocalist Luke Hemmings, lead guitarist Michael Clifford, bassist Calum Hood, and drummer Ashton Irwin. They have released six studio albums and headlined multiple world tours. All singles from their six studio albums, as well as all six albums, have charted in a substantial number of countries, received multiple official sale certifications and have been featured in a large amount of weekly and year-end charts, as well as making an appearance on decade-end charts.

The band has received numerous accolades and awards including being honored with the prestigious APRA Awards' Outstanding International Achievement Award in 2019 and being credited in the exclusive APRA AMCOS' The 1,000,000,000 List in 2020. 5 Seconds of Summer has been placed on Billboard's Top Artists of the 2010s Chart, which lists the most popular and successful artists of the 2010–2019 decade.

== 4Music Video Honours ==
The 4Music Video Honours is an annual music awards show by 4Music, a music and entertainment channel in the United Kingdom and available on some digital television providers in the Republic of Ireland.

Year	Nominated	Award	Result	Ref.
2014	5 Seconds of Summer	Best Breakthrough	Won	

== AACTA Awards ==
Year	Nominated	Award	Result	Ref.
2026	"Boyband"	Audience Choice Award for Favourite Australian Music Video	Nominated	

== Alternative Press Music Awards ==
Year	Nominated	Award	Result	Ref.
2015	5 Seconds of Summer	Best Fandom presented by Tumblr	Won	

== American Music Awards ==
The American Music Awards (AMAs) is an annual American music awards show, created by Dick Clark in 1973 for ABC when the network's contract to present the Grammy Awards expired.

Year	Nominated	Award	Result	Ref.
2014	5 Seconds of Summer	New Artist of the Year	Won	

== Australian Music Prize ==
The Australian Music Prize (AMP) is an annual award of $30,000 given to an Australian band or solo artist in recognition of the merit of an album released during the year of award.

Year	Nominated	Award	Result	Ref.
2020	Calm	Australian Music Prize	Nominated	

== APRA Awards (Australia) ==
The APRA Awards in Australia are annual awards to celebrate excellence in contemporary music, which honour the skills of member composers, songwriters and publishers who have achieved outstanding success in sales and airplay performance.

Year	Nominated	Award	Result	Ref.
2015	"She Looks So Perfect"	Most Played Australian Work	Nominated	
2015	"She Looks So Perfect"	Pop Work of the Year	Nominated	
2015	5 Seconds of Summer	Breakthrough Songwriter of the Year	Won	
2019	5 Seconds of Summer	Outstanding International Achievement Award	Won	
2020	"Teeth"	Song of the Year	Nominated	
2023	"Complete Mess"	Song of the Year	Shortlisted	
2023	"Complete Mess"	Most Performed Pop Work of the Year	Nominated	

== ARIA Music Awards ==
The Australian Recording Industry Association Music Awards (commonly known informally as ARIA Music Awards or ARIA Awards) is an annual series of awards nights celebrating the Australian music industry, put on by the Australian Recording Industry Association (ARIA).

Year	Nominated	Award	Result	Ref.
2014	5 Seconds of Summer	Best Group	Nominated	
2014	5 Seconds of Summer	Best Pop Release	Nominated	
2014	5 Seconds of Summer	Breakthrough Artist	Nominated	
2014	"She Looks So Perfect"	Song of the Year	Won	
2015	LiveSOS	Best Group	Nominated	
2015	Rock Out With Your Socks Out Tour	Best Australian Live Act	Won	
2018	Youngblood	Best Group	Won	
2018	Youngblood	Best Pop Release	Nominated	
2018	Meet You There Tour	Best Australian Live Act	Won	
2018	"Youngblood"	Song of the Year	Won	
2019	"Easier"	Best Group	Nominated	
2019	"Easier"	Song of the Year	Nominated	
2020	Calm	Best Group	Nominated	
2020	"Teeth"	Song of the Year	Won	
2026	Everyone's a Star!	Best Group	Nominated	

== ASCAP Awards ==
The American Society of Composers, Authors, and Publishers Awards (ASCAP) is an annual American music awards show which honors its top members in seven different music categories.

Year	Nominated	Award	Result	Ref.
2020	"Youngblood"	Pop Music Award	Won	

== BBC Radio 1 Teen Awards ==
Year	Nominated	Award	Result	Ref.
2016	5 Seconds of Summer	Best International Group	Won	

== Billboard Awards ==
=== Billboard Music Awards ===
Year	Nominated	Award	Result	Ref.
2015	5 Seconds of Summer	Top New Artist	Nominated	
2015	5 Seconds of Summer	Top Duo/Group	Nominated	

=== Billboard.com Mid-Year Music Awards ===
Billboard is an American music magazine, headquartered in New York City, New York and owned by Prometheus Global Media.

Year	Nominated	Award	Result	Ref.
2014	5 Seconds of Summer	Breakout Star	Nominated	

=== Billboard Touring Awards ===
Year	Nominated	Award	Result	Ref.
2015	5 Seconds of Summer	Breakthrough Artist	Nominated	

== BMI Awards ==
The BMI Awards are annual award ceremonies based in the United States, honoring the industry's top songwriters, publishers and top 50 best-performing songs of the year.

Year	Nominated	Award	Result	Ref.
2019	"Youngblood" (song)	Best Performing Song	Won	
2020	"Who Do You Love"	Best Performing Song	Won	
2020	"Easier"	Best Performing Song	Won	

== Bravo Otto ==
Established in 1957, the Bravo Otto is a German accolade honoring excellence of performers in film, television and music, presented by the Bravo magazine.

Year	Nominated	Award	Result	Ref.
2016	5 Seconds of Summer	Super-Band (Best Band/Duo)	Nominated	
2019	5 Seconds of Summer	Super-Band (Best Band/Duo)	Nominated	

== Brit Awards ==
Year	Nominated	Award	Result	Ref.
2015	5 Seconds of Summer	International Group	Nominated	

== Channel V ==
The Channel V Oz Artist of the Year was an annual award presented by Channel V Australia. The last award was presented in 2014.

Year	Nominated	Award	Result	Ref.
2013	5 Seconds of Summer	Oz Artist Award	Won	
2014	5 Seconds of Summer	Oz Artist Award	Won	

== Electronic Dance Music Awards ==
The Electronic Dance Music Awards are presented by iHeart Radio and commenced in 2022.

Year	Nominee / work	Award	Result	Ref.
2025	"Lighter" (with David Guetta)	Dance / Electro Pop Song of the Year	Nominated	

== GAFFA Awards ==
=== GAFFA Awards (Denmark) ===
Delivered since 1991, the GAFFA Awards are a Danish award that rewards popular music by the magazine of the same name.

Year	Nominated	Award	Result	Ref.
2019	5 Seconds of Summer	Best Foreign Band	Nominated	
2019	"Youngblood" (album)	Best Foreign Album	Nominated	
2019	"Youngblood" (song)	Best Foreign Song	Nominated	

== Global Awards ==
Year	Nominated	Award	Result	Ref.
2019	"Youngblood"	Best Song	Nominated	
2019	5 Seconds of Summer	Best Group	Nominated	
2019	5 Seconds of Summer	Best Pop	Nominated	

== iHeartRadio MMVAs ==
Year	Nominated	Award	Result	Ref.
2014	"She Looks So Perfect"	International Video of the Year – Group	Nominated	
2018	5 Seconds of Summer	Fan Fave Duo/Group	Nominated	
2018	5 Seconds of Summer	Best Dressed	Won	

== iHeartRadio Music Awards ==
Year	Nominated	Award	Result	Ref.
2015	5SOSFam	Best Fan Army	Won	
2016	5SOSFam	Best Fan Army	Nominated	
2019	5SOSFam	Best Fan Army	Nominated	
2019	5 Seconds of Summer	Best Duo/Group of the Year	Won	
2020	"Dancing with a Stranger"	Best Cover Song	Won	

== iHeartRadio Titanium Awards ==
iHeartRadio Titanium Awards are awarded to an artist when their song reaches 1 Billion Spins across iHeartRadio Stations.

Year	Nominated	Notes	Ref.
2019	"Youngblood"	iHeartRadio Titanium Awards are awarded to an artist when their song reaches 1 Billion Spins across iHeartRadio Stations.	

== JIM Awards ==
Year	Nominated	Award	Result	Ref.
2015	5 Seconds of Summer	Best International Band	Nominated	

== Kerrang! Awards ==
Year	Nominated	Award	Result	Ref.
2014	5 Seconds of Summer	Best International Newcomer presented by Troxy	Won	

== Meus Prêmios Nick ==
Year	Nominated	Award	Result	Ref.
2018	5 Seconds of Summer	Favorite International Artist	Nominated	

== Most Played Songs Online Awards ==
The MPS Online Awards or MOA are online awards presented by music chart page Most Played Songs to give honor and appreciation for artists who have substantial influence in the Philippines and the international music scene.

Year	Nominated	Award	Result	Ref.
2014	5 Seconds of Summer	Favorite Pop Group	Won	
2015	5 Seconds of Summer	Favorite Pop Group	Nominated	
2015	"Amnesia"	Favorite Mellow Song	Won	
2015	"Don't Stop"	Favorite Chart-Topper Song	Nominated	
2016	5 Seconds of Summer	Favorite International Group	Nominated	
2016	"She's Kinda Hot"	Favorite Chart-Topper Song	Nominated	
2017	5 Seconds of Summer	Favorite International Group	Nominated	
2017	"Girls Talk Boys"	Favorite Movie Soundtrack	Nominated	
2019	5 Seconds of Summer	Favorite International Group	Nominated	
2019	"Want You Back"	Favorite Chart-Topper Song	Nominated	
2020	5 Seconds of Summer	Favorite International Group	Won	

== MTV Awards ==
=== MTV Europe Music Awards ===
Year	Nominated	Award	Result	Ref.
2014	5 Seconds of Summer	Artist on the Rise	Won	
2014	5 Seconds of Summer	Best Australia & New Zealand Act	Won	
2014	5 Seconds of Summer	Best Australian Act	Won	
2014	5 Seconds of Summer	Best New Artist	Won	
2014	5 Seconds of Summer	Best Pop Artist	Nominated	
2014	5 Seconds of Summer	Best Push Act	Won	
2014	5 Seconds of Summer	Biggest Fans	Nominated	
2014	5 Seconds of Summer	Best Worldwide Act	Nominated	
2015	5 Seconds of Summer	Best Australian Act	Won	
2015	5 Seconds of Summer	Best Pop	Nominated	
2015	5 Seconds of Summer	Worldwide Act : Australia/New Zealand	Won	
2015	5SOSFAM	Biggest Fans	Nominated	
2018	5 Seconds of Summer	Best Group	Nominated	
2018	5 Seconds of Summer	Best Rock	Won	
2020	5 Seconds of Summer	Best Group	Nominated	

=== MTV Italian Music Awards ===
Year	Nominated	Award	Result	Ref.
2014	5SOSFam	Sammontana Best Fan	Nominated	
2014	5 Seconds of Summer	Best Artist From The World	Nominated	
2014	5 Seconds of Summer	Best New Artist	Nominated	
2015	5 Seconds of Summer	Best Band	Nominated	
2015	5 Seconds of Summer	Artist Saga	Nominated	

=== MTV Spain ===
Year	Nominated	Award	Result	Ref.
2016	"Jet Black Heart"	Video Del Verano	Won	

=== MTV UK ===
Year	Nominated	Award	Result	Ref.
2018	5 Seconds of Summer	MTV Hottest Summer Superstar (third place)	Won	
2019	5 Seconds of Summer	MTV Hottest Summer Superstar (sixth place)	Won	
2020	5 Seconds of Summer	MTV Hottest Summer Superstar (fourth place)	Won	

=== MTV Video Music Awards ===
The American MTV Video Music Awards (VMAs) is an award show by the cable network MTV to honor the top music videos of the year.

Year	Nominated	Award	Result	Ref.
2014	"She Looks So Perfect"	Artist to Watch	Nominated	
2014	"Don't Stop"	Best Lyric Video	Won	
2015	"She's Kinda Hot"	Song of the Summer	Won	
2019	"Easier"	Best Pop	Nominated	
2019	5 Seconds of Summer	Best Group	Nominated	
2020	"Old Me"	Best Cinematography	Nominated	
2020	"Wildflower"	Best Music Video From Home	Nominated	
2020	5 Seconds of Summer	Best Group	Nominated	

== MYX Music Awards ==
Year	Nominated	Award	Result	Ref.
2015	"Don't Stop"	Favorite International Video	Nominated	
2016	"She's Kinda Hot"	Favorite International Video	Nominated	

== Neox Fan Awards ==
Year	Nominated	Award	Result	Ref.
2014	5 Seconds of Summer	Best New Act of the Year	Nominated	

== Nickelodeon Kids' Choice Awards ==
Year	Nominated	Award	Result	Ref.
2014	5 Seconds of Summer	Aussies' Fave Hot New Talent	Won	
2015	5 Seconds of Summer	Favorite New Artist	Nominated	
2015	5 Seconds of Summer	Favorite Aussie/Kiwi Music Act	Won	
2015	5SOSFAM	Aussie/Kiwi's Favorite Fan Army	Won	
2016	5 Seconds of Summer	Favourite Pop Sensation (AU/NZ)	Won	
2018	5 Seconds of Summer	Fave Aussie/Kiwi Squad	Won	
2019	"Youngblood"	Favourite Song	Nominated	
2020	5 Seconds of Summer	Favourite Aussie/Kiwi Music Maker	Won	

== NME Awards ==
Year	Nominated	Award	Result	Ref.
2015	5 Seconds of Summer	Worst Band	Won	
2016	5 Seconds of Summer	Worst Band	Won	
2017	5 Seconds of Summer	Worst Band	Won	

== People's Choice Awards ==
Year	Nominated	Award	Result	Ref.
2015	5 Seconds of Summer	Favorite Breakout Artist	Won	
2018	5 Seconds of Summer	Group of 2018	Nominated	
2020	5 Seconds of Summer	Group of 2020	Nominated	
2022	5 Seconds of Summer	Group of 2022	Nominated	

== Pollstar Awards ==
Year	Nominated	Award	Result	Ref.
2015	5 Seconds of Summer	Best New Touring Artist	Nominated	

== Radio Disney Music Awards ==
Year	Nominated	Award	Result	Ref.
2015	5 Seconds of Summer	Best Music Group	Nominated	
2015	5 Seconds of Summer	Most Talked About Artist	Nominated	

== Rockbjörnen ==
Year	Nominated	Award	Result	Ref.
2014	"She Looks So Perfect"	Årets utländska låt (Best Foreign Song)	Nominated	

== Rock Sound Readers' Poll ==
The Rock Sound Readers' Poll is a poll held by Rock Sound magazine from UK.

Year	Nominated	Award	Result	Ref.
2014	5 Seconds of Summer	Best International Newcomer	Won	
2014	5 Seconds of Summer	Best Rock Sound Cover	Won	
2014	5 Seconds of Summer	Worst International Band	Nominated	
2014	5 Seconds of Summer	Most Improved Band	Nominated	

== Rollers Music Awards ==
The Rollers Music Awards are Spanish awards that were launched on 1 October 2014.

Year	Nominated	Award	Result	Ref.
2014	"Amnesia"	Best Ballad of the Year	Nominated	
2014	5 Seconds of Summer	Best New Group	Nominated	
2014	5 Seconds of Summer	Best Teen Group	Nominated	

== Rolling Stone Australia Awards ==
The Rolling Stone Australia Awards are annual awards presented by the Australian edition of Rolling Stone magazine for outstanding contributions to popular culture in the previous year.

Year	Nominated	Award	Result	Ref.
2021	5 Seconds of Summer	Rolling Stone Global Award	Nominated	
2023	5SOS5	Best Record	Nominated	

== Shorty Awards ==
Year	Nominated	Award	Result	Ref.
2014	5 Seconds of Summer	Band	Nominated	
2015	5 Seconds of Summer	Band	Nominated	
2015	Calum Hood	Musician	Nominated	

== SSE Live Awards ==
The SSE Live Awards are an annual music award which are voted and decided by the public, honoring the best live acts of the year at SSE venues.

Year	Nominated	Award	Result	Ref.
2016	5 Seconds of Summer	Best Group	Nominated	
2019	5 Seconds of Summer	Best Group	Nominated	

== Teen Choice Awards ==
Year	Nominated	Award	Result	Ref.
2014	"Amnesia"	Choice Music: Break-Up Song	Nominated	
2014	5 Seconds of Summer	Choice Music: Breakout Group	Won	
2014	5 Seconds of Summer	Choice Music: Group	Nominated	
2014	5 Seconds of Summer	Choice Summer: Music Group	Won	
2014	"She Looks So Perfect"	Choice Music: Song – Group	Nominated	
2015	5 Seconds of Summer	Choice Music Group: Male	Nominated	
2015	5 Seconds of Summer	Choice Male Hottie	Nominated	
2015	5 Seconds of Summer	Choice International Artist	Nominated	
2015	5 Seconds of Summer	Choice Summer Music Star: Group	Nominated	
2015	"What I Like About You"	Choice Song: Group	Nominated	
2015	Rock Out with Your Socks Out Tour	Choice Summer Tour	Nominated	
2015	5SOSFam	Choice Fandom	Nominated	
2016	5 Seconds of Summer	Choice Music: Group	Nominated	
2016	"She's Kinda Hot"	Choice Music Single: Group	Nominated	
2016	"Jet Black Heart"	Choice Music: Rock Song	Won	
2016	"Vapor"	Choice Music: Love Song	Nominated	
2016	5 Seconds of Summer	Choice Summer Music Star: Group	Won	
2016	Sounds Live Feels Live World Tour	Choice Summer Tour	Won	
2018	5 Seconds of Summer	Choice Music Group	Won	
2018	5 Seconds of Summer	Choice Summer Group	Won	
2018	"Youngblood"	Choice Song: Group	Won	
2018	"Youngblood"	Choice Summer Song	Nominated	
2019	5 Seconds of Summer	Choice Music Group	Nominated	
2019	5 Seconds of Summer	Choice Summer Group	Nominated	
2019	"Easier"	Choice Song: Group	Nominated	
2019	"Easier"	Choice Summer Song	Nominated	
2019	"Who Do You Love"	Choice Electronic/Dance Song	Nominated	

== Telehit Awards ==
The Telehit Awards were an annual award show run by the Mexican music channel Telehit.

Year	Nominated	Award	Result	Ref.
2014	"Don't Stop"	Most Popular Video	Won	
2014	5 Seconds of Summer	Boyband of the Year	Nominated	
2015	5 Seconds of Summer	Canción Pop/Rock del Año	Won	
2015	5 Seconds of Summer	Artista más popular en Telehit	Nominated	
2016	"Girls Talk Boys"	Video en inglés más pedido	Won	

== Vevo Certified ==
Year	Nominated	Award	Result	Ref.
-	5 Seconds of Summer	Vevo Certified Award	Won	

== World Music Awards ==
The World Music Awards were an international awards show founded in 1989 in Monte-Carlo. Awards were presented to the world's best-selling artists and were given based on sales figures provided by the International Federation of the Phonographic Industry (IFPI). The last ceremony was held in 2014.

Year	Nominated	Award	Result	Ref.
2014	5 Seconds of Summer	World's Best Group	Nominated	
2014	5 Seconds of Summer	World's Best Live Act	Nominated	
2014	"She Looks So Perfect"	World's Best Song	Nominated	
2014	"Wherever You Are"	World's Best Song	Nominated	
2014	"She Looks So Perfect"	World's Best Video	Nominated	
2014	"Wherever You Are"	World's Best Video	Nominated	

== Young Hollywood Awards ==
Year	Nominated	Award	Result	Ref.
2014	5 Seconds of Summer	Breakout Music Artist	Nominated	

== YouTube Creator Awards ==
Year	Nominated	Award	Result	Ref.
-	5 Seconds of Summer	Silver Creator Award	Won	
-	5 Seconds of Summer	Gold Creator Award	Won	

== Other accolades ==
=== APRA AMCOS' The 1,000,000,000 List ===
On 18 February 2020, 5 Seconds of Summer was awarded and honored in the APRA AMCOS' The 1,000,000,000 List, which recognizes excellence among Australian songwriting artists who have achieved massive international success. The band was awarded for their single, "Youngblood", reaching over a billion streams.

=== Listicles ===
Name of publisher, year listed, name of listicle, and placement
Publisher	Year	Listicle	Placement	Ref.
Forbes	2015	30 Under 30 (Music)	Placed	
Billboard	2019	Social 50: Decade End (2010–2019)	27th	
Billboard	2019	Top Artists: Decade End (2010–2019)	Placed	
Yahoo! Finance	2020	Richest Boy Bands in the World	10th	
Sunday Herald Sun	2020	Greatest Australian Bands Of All Time	17th	
Rolling Stone Australia	2020	50 Greatest Australian Artists Of All Time	16th	
