= Sounds Live Feels Live World Tour =

2016 concert tour by 5 Seconds of Summer

Sounds Live Feels Live Tour
- Tour by 5 Seconds of Summer
- Promotional poster for the tour
- Location: Asia; Australia; Europe; North America
- Associated album: Sounds Good Feels Good
- Start date: February 19, 2016
- End date: October 5, 2016
- Legs: 4
- No. of shows: 101
- Attendance: 743,906
- Box office: $39 million

5 Seconds of Summer concert chronology
- Rock Out with Your Socks Out Tour (2015); Sounds Live Feels Live Tour (2016); 5SOS III Tour (2018)

The Sounds Live Feels Live World Tour was the second headlining concert tour by the Australian pop rock band 5 Seconds of Summer, in support of their second studio album, Sounds Good Feels Good. The tour started on February 19, 2016 in Nagoya, Japan at the Nagoya Congress Center and concluded on October 5, 2016 in Sydney, Australia at the Hordern Pavilion. The tour's title is in reference to 5 Seconds of Summer's 2015 album.

== Background ==
In October 2015, the band announced the European headlining dates, and later followed this up with announcements for both Asia and North America. The 101 dates announced represented a sizable increase from their debut tour a year earlier, primarily due to the addition of the Asian leg as well as new venues in Europe, the United States and Mexico. However, the band halved its Canadian appearances to only two shows; the band would not be revisiting any cities in Western Canada.

== Reception ==
The tour was met with generally favorable reviews. Sugarscape.com awarded the show five stars out of five; writing "We're not even sure how they manage it, but these boys sound better *and* feel better every time we see 'em.". Kathy McCabe from The Daily Telegraph wrote: "The screams [of their fans] hurt your ears, the songs don’t; their infectious pop hooks, three-part vocals and Irwin's propulsive rhythms and energetic performance inciting you to move."

The tour made $39 million in ticket sales.

== Set list ==
This set list is representative of the performance on 15 July 2016 at Madison Square Garden in New York City, New York. It does not represent the set list at all concerts for the duration of the tour.

1. "Carry On"
2. "Hey Everybody!"
3. "Money"
4. "Voodoo Doll"
5. "Don't Stop"
6. "Disconnected"
7. "Long Way Home"
8. "Outer Space"
9. "Waste the Night"
10. "Vapor"
11. "Amnesia"
12. "Castaway"
13. "Jet Black Heart"
14. "End Up Here"
15. "Good Girls"
16. "Girls Talk Boys"
17. "Permanent Vacation"
18. "What I Like About You"
  Encore
19. "She's Kinda Hot"
20. "She Looks So Perfect"

== Tour dates ==
List of 2016 concerts
Date	City	Country	Venue	Opening Act(s)	Attendance	Box Office
19 February 2016	Nagoya	Japan	Nagoya Century Hall	—	2,375 / 2,800	$207,565
20 February 2016	Osaka	Japan	Intex Osaka	—	4,256 / 6,500	$380,378
23 February 2016	Tokyo	Japan	Nippon Budokan	—	7,889 / 8,500	$696,477
27 February 2016	Shanghai	China	Shanghai Grand Stage	—	—	—
29 February 2016	Taipei	Taiwan	NTU Sports Center	—	—	—
2 March 2016	Kuala Lumpur	Malaysia	Plenary Hall	Paperplane Pursuit	2,576 / 5,428	$252,214
3 March 2016	Singapore		The Star Performing Arts Centre	—	3,675 / 5,046	$604,749
5 March 2016	Jakarta	Indonesia	Indonesia Convention Exhibition	Pee Wee Gaskins	3,962 / 9,996	$647,831
8 March 2016	Bangkok	Thailand	IMPACT Arena	SixtyMiles	2,157 / 10,581	$266,498
10 March 2016	Hong Kong		AsiaWorld–Expo Hall 10	KillerSoap	1,655 / 7,036	$247,107
12 March 2016	Pasay	Philippines	Mall of Asia Arena	Katsy Lea	8,920 / 9,353	$838,378
5 April 2016	Sheffield	England	Sheffield Arena	Jessarae	7,500 / 10,900	$418,886
7 April 2016	London	England	The O_{2} Arena	Jessarae	25,408 / 25,408	$1,339,580
8 April 2016	London	England	The O_{2} Arena	Jessarae	25,408 / 25,408	$1,339,580
9 April 2016	Brighton	England	Brighton Centre	Jessarae	3,513 / 3,575	$229,124
11 April 2016	Leeds	England	First Direct Arena	Jessarae	6,609 / 11,000	$375,608
12 April 2016	Nottingham	England	Motorpoint Arena Nottingham	Jessarae	5,915 / 6,400	$337,693
14 April 2016	Birmingham	England	Genting Arena	Jessarae	11,602 / 12,100	$615,797
15 April 2016	Cardiff	Wales	Motorpoint Arena Cardiff	Jessarae; Don Broco	7,437 / 8,600	$442,595
16 April 2016	Cardiff	Wales	Motorpoint Arena Cardiff	Jessarae; Don Broco	7,437 / 8,600	$442,595
18 April 2016	Newcastle	England	Metro Radio Arena	Jessarae; Don Broco	7,403 / 8,900	$411,239
19 April 2016	Glasgow	Scotland	SSE Hydro	Jessarae; Don Broco	14,685 / 16,396	$810,455
20 April 2016	Glasgow	Scotland	SSE Hydro	Jessarae; Don Broco	14,685 / 16,396	$810,455
22 April 2016	Manchester	England	Manchester Arena	Jessarae; Don Broco	17,604 / 20,580	$968,109
23 April 2016	Manchester	England	Manchester Arena	Jessarae; Don Broco	17,604 / 20,580	$968,109
25 April 2016	Belfast	Northern Ireland	SSE Arena	Jessarae; Don Broco	7,984 / 8,000	$393,610
26 April 2016	Dublin	Ireland	3Arena	Jessarae; Don Broco	13,538 / 18,000	$674,871
27 April 2016	Dublin	Ireland	3Arena	Jessarae; Don Broco	13,538 / 18,000	$674,871
12 May 2016	Vienna	Austria	Wiener Stadthalle	Don Broco	6,299 / 10,827	$310,164
13 May 2016	Verona	Italy	Arena di Verona	Don Broco	12,652 / 12,652	$557,849
14 May 2016	Rome	Italy	PalaLottomatica	Don Broco	12,000 / 12,000	$550,895
16 May 2016	Munich	Germany	Olympiahalle	Don Broco	6,413 / 9,254	$308,627
17 May 2016	Paris	France	AccorHotels Arena	Don Broco	6,608 / 11,323	$390,638
18 May 2016	Lille	France	Zénith de Lille	Don Broco	—	—
20 May 2016	Antwerp	Belgium	Sportpaleis	Don Broco	7,983 / 9,858	$372,533
21 May 2016	Amsterdam	Netherlands	Ziggo Dome	Don Broco	16,921 / 18,958	$812,440
22 May 2016	Amsterdam	Netherlands	Ziggo Dome	Don Broco	16,921 / 18,958	$812,440
24 May 2016	Zürich	Switzerland	Hallenstadion	Don Broco	—	—
25 May 2016	Amnéville	France	Galaxie Amnéville	Don Broco	—	—
26 May 2016	Hamburg	Germany	Barclaycard Arena	Don Broco	5,091 / 7,396	$269,139
28 May 2016	Herning	Denmark	Jyske Bank Boxen	Don Broco	—	—
29 May 2016	Copenhagen	Denmark	Forum Copenhagen	Don Broco	—	—
31 May 2016	Oslo	Norway	Oslo Spektrum	Don Broco	—	—
1 June 2016	Stockholm	Sweden	Ericsson Globe	Don Broco	5,895 / 10,263	$340,747
3 June 2016	Helsinki	Finland	Hartwall Arena	Don Broco	4,904 / 6,192	$321,624
4 June 2016	Tallinn	Estonia	Saku Suurhall Arena	Don Broco	—	—
6 June 2016	Berlin	Germany	Mercedes-Benz Arena	Don Broco	—	—
7 June 2016	Mannheim	Germany	SAP Arena	Don Broco	—	—
8 June 2016	Cologne	Germany	Lanxess Arena	Don Broco	7,471 / 13,449	$355,974
10 June 2016	Barcelona	Spain	Palau Sant Jordi	Sexy Zebras	—	—
11 June 2016	Madrid	Spain	Palacio Vistalegre	Sexy Zebras	8,219 / 8,660	$433,998
30 June 2016	Uncasville	United States	Mohegan Sun Arena	One Ok Rock; Hey Violet	11,195 / 14,070	$791,830
1 July 2016	Uncasville	United States	Mohegan Sun Arena	One Ok Rock; Hey Violet	11,195 / 14,070	$791,830
2 July 2016	Hershey	United States	Hersheypark Stadium	One Ok Rock; Hey Violet	13,507 / 15,453	$732,870
5 July 2016	Syracuse	United States	Lakeview Amphitheater	One Ok Rock; Hey Violet	—	—
6 July 2016	Darien	United States	Darien Lake Performing Arts Center	One Ok Rock; Hey Violet	—	—
8 July 2016	Bristow	United States	Jiffy Lube Live	One Ok Rock; Hey Violet	8,464 / 22,583	$458,719
9 July 2016	Mansfield	United States	Xfinity Center	One Ok Rock; Hey Violet	11,196 / 19,767	$616,766
10 July 2016	Holmdel	United States	PNC Bank Arts Center	One Ok Rock; Hey Violet	9,821 / 16,175	$427,686
12 July 2016	Toronto	Canada	Molson Canadian Amphitheatre	One Ok Rock; Hey Violet	10,085 / 15,924	$478,047
13 July 2016	Montreal	Canada	Bell Centre	One Ok Rock; Hey Violet	7,252 / 8,737	$388,253
15 July 2016	New York City	United States	Madison Square Garden	One Ok Rock; Hey Violet	12,660 / 12,914	$771,186
16 July 2016	Camden	United States	BB&T Pavilion	One Ok Rock; Hey Violet	8,134 / 23,533	$380,405
18 July 2016	Charlotte	United States	PNC Music Pavilion	One Ok Rock; Hey Violet	9,869 / 18,752	$471,280
20 July 2016	Jacksonville	United States	Jacksonville Veterans Memorial Arena	One Ok Rock; Hey Violet	7,895 / 9,448	$483,550
22 July 2016	Pelham	United States	Oak Mountain Amphitheatre	One Ok Rock; Hey Violet	—	—
23 July 2016	Nashville	United States	Bridgestone Arena	One Ok Rock; Hey Violet	12,158 / 13,609	$633,199
24 July 2016	Atlanta	United States	Lakewood Amphitheatre	One Ok Rock; Hey Violet	—	—
26 July 2016	Cincinnati	United States	Riverbend Music Center	One Ok Rock; Hey Violet	10,351 / 20,285	$383,434
27 July 2016	Auburn Hills	United States	The Palace of Auburn Hills	One Ok Rock; Hey Violet	10,409 / 13,252	$650,300
29 July 2016	Moline	United States	iWireless Center	One Ok Rock; Hey Violet	—	—
30 July 2016	Tinley Park	United States	Hollywood Casino Amphitheatre	One Ok Rock; Hey Violet	12,375 / 27,542	$576,707
31 July 2016	St. Paul	United States	Xcel Energy Center	One Ok Rock	7,967 / 14,081	$504,850
18 August 2016	Tulsa	United States	BOK Center	Hey Violet; Roy English	6,287 / 11,330	$331,018
19 August 2016	Maryland Heights	United States	Hollywood Casino Amphitheatre	Hey Violet; Roy English	8,702 / 20,000	$298,440
20 August 2016	Kansas City	United States	Sprint Center	Hey Violet; Roy English	10,634 / 13,345	$435,607
22 August 2016	Omaha	United States	CenturyLink Center Omaha	Hey Violet; Roy English	10,761 / 13,300	$303,180
24 August 2016	Denver	United States	Pepsi Center	Hey Violet; Roy English	12,644 / 14,462	$388,155
26 August 2016	West Valley City	United States	USANA Amphitheatre	Hey Violet; Roy English	18,483 / 19,011	$898,560
27 August 2016	Boise	United States	Taco Bell Arena	Hey Violet; Roy English	—	—
28 August 2016	Auburn	United States	White River Amphitheatre	Hey Violet; Roy English	5,862 / 8,493	$256,105
30 August 2016	Spokane	United States	Spokane Veterans Memorial Arena	Hey Violet; Roy English	8,505 / 10,825	$232,763
31 August 2016	Ridgefield	United States	Sunlight Supply Amphitheater	Hey Violet; Roy English	4,174 / 7,447	$214,433
2 September 2016	Mountain View	United States	Shoreline Amphitheatre	Hey Violet; Roy English	9,738 / 22,019	$383,339
3 September 2016	Wheatland	United States	Toyota Amphitheatre	Hey Violet; Roy English	8,159 / 18,500	$263,352
4 September 2016	Irvine	United States	Irvine Meadows Amphitheatre	Hey Violet; Roy English	11,916 / 14,869	$596,888
7 September 2016	Inglewood	United States	The Forum	Hey Violet; Roy English	10,578 / 10,879	$435,780
9 September 2016	Chula Vista	United States	Sleep Train Amphitheatre	Hey Violet; Roy English	7,192 / 9,332	$323,355
10 September 2016	Phoenix	United States	Ak-Chin Pavilion	Hey Violet; Roy English	8,664 / 19,995	$376,924
11 September 2016	Albuquerque	United States	Isleta Amphitheater	Hey Violet; Roy English	5,279 / 5,912	$209,879
14 September 2016	San Antonio	United States	AT&T Center	Hey Violet; Roy English	11,769 / 13,063	$329,040
16 September 2016	New Orleans	United States	Smoothie King Center	Hey Violet; Roy English	12,444 / 13,001	$496,911
17 September 2016	Dallas	United States	Gexa Energy Pavilion	Hey Violet; Roy English	10,947 / 19,957	$518,394
18 September 2016	The Woodlands	United States	Cynthia Woods Mitchell Pavilion	Hey Violet; Roy English	9,444 / 15,883	$484,646
21 September 2016	Monterrey	Mexico	Auditorio Banamex	Communión	6,581 / 6,581	$315,039
23 September 2016	Mexico City	Mexico	Auditorio Nacional	Communión	18,789 / 19,138	$891,830
24 September 2016	Mexico City	Mexico	Auditorio Nacional	Communión	18,789 / 19,138	$891,830
29 September 2016	Melbourne	Australia	Margaret Court Arena	Hey Violet; With Confidence	6,424 / 6,424	$451,334
2 October 2016	Brisbane	Australia	Riverstage	Hey Violet; With Confidence	5,014 / 8,000	$351,831
4 October 2016	Sydney	Australia	Hordern Pavilion	Hey Violet; With Confidence	9,497 / 11,100	$653,095
5 October 2016	Sydney	Australia	Hordern Pavilion	Hey Violet; With Confidence	9,497 / 11,100	$653,095
TOTAL					743,906 / 939,455 (79%)	$39,132,426
