= LiveSOS =

- Album cover (standard version)

Live album by 5 Seconds of Summer
- Released: 15 December 2014
- Recorded: 2014
- Genres: Pop rock; power pop; pop punk
- Length: 58:20
- Label: Capitol
- Producers: Louis Biancaniello; Michael Biancaniello; Joel Chapman; John Feldmann; Red Triangle; Dan Lancaster; Steve Robson; Louis Schoorl; Jake Sinclair; Eric Valentine

5 Seconds of Summer chronology
5 Seconds of Summer (2014)	LiveSOS (2014)	Sounds Good Feels Good (2015)

Singles from LiveSOS
- 1. "What I Like About You" Released: 2 December 2014

LiveSOS is the first live album by Australian pop-rock band 5 Seconds of Summer, which was released on 15 December 2014. The album consists of 14 live tracks from the band's debut album 5 Seconds of Summer, and EP She Looks So Perfect, and a studio mix of "What I Like About You". There are also two bonus tracks, a live version of "Don't Stop" and Kiss Me Kiss Me as iTunes and Target exclusives respectively. To promote the album, the studio version of "What I Like About You" will be serviced to contemporary hit radio in December 2014 as the lead single from LiveSOS. It was nominated at the 2015 ARIA Music Awards for Best Group, but lost to Tame Impala for Currents.

== Background ==
On 22 November, the band announced through various social networks, and later, through the official website that they would release a live album, featuring songs from their debut album 5 Seconds of Summer, and their EPs. This is the band's first live album and follows their debut studio album released earlier in 2014. On the album, they commented, "Playing live has been something we have been the most passionate about from the beginning. All we want is for our fans to come to the shows, rock out and have one of the best times they've ever experienced. Also when a room is full of you guys from all different walks of life, you can let it go when you come to the shows and be free to be yourself. Our live album 'LIVESOS' is now available to preorder on iTunes or our webstore in the USA, Canada & Mexico. Everywhere else can from midnight this Sunday 23 October. It has 15 tracks recorded in different venues around the world! Anyways we love you, this is our life... You rule!"

== Recording and composition ==
The 16 live tracks (including bonus tracks) were all recorded on September 10, 2014 at their show in House of Blues, West Hollywood, California.

== B-side ==
The B-side was released in 2016 which contains three tracks: "500 Years of Winter - Pizza Song - Live", "Don’t Stop - Live", and "What I Like About You - Studio Mix".

== Track listing ==
LiveSOS — standard version
No.	Title	Writer(s)	Length
1.	"18"	Luke Hemmings; Michael Clifford; Richard Stannard; Seton Daunt; Ash Howes; Roy Stride	5:57
2.	"Out of My Limit"	Calum Hood; Luke Hemmings	3:25
3.	"Disconnected"	Luke Hemmings; Calum Hood; John Feldmann; Alex Gaskarth	3:45
4.	"Amnesia"	Benjamin Madden; Joel Madden; Louis Biancaniello; Michael Biancaniello; Sam Watters	4:16
5.	"Beside You"	Calum Hood; Luke Hemmings; Christian Lo Russo; Joel Chapman	3:58
6.	"Everything I Didn't Say"	Ashton Irwin; Calum Hood; Feldmann; Nicholas "RAS" Furlong	3:57
7.	"Long Way Home"	Ashton Irwin; Michael Clifford; Feldmann; Alex Gaskarth	4:26
8.	"Heartache On the Big Screen"	Ashton Irwin; Michael Clifford; Luke Hemmings; Calum Hood; Dan Lancaster; Mike Duce	4:02
9.	"American Idiot"	Billie Joe Armstrong	3:20
10.	"Teenage Dream"	Katy Perry; Lukasz Gottwald; Max Martin; Benjamin Levin; Bonnie McKee	4:12
11.	"Good Girls"	Ashton Irwin; Michael Clifford; Rick Parkhouse; George Tizzard; Stride; Josh Wilkinson	2:55
12.	"What I Like About You"	Walter Palamarchuk; Michael Skill; James Marinos	3:55
13.	"End Up Here"	Ashton Irwin; Michael Clifford; Feldmann; Gaskarth	3:04
14.	"She Looks So Perfect"	Ashton Irwin; Michael Clifford; Lancaster; Jake Sinclair	4:26
15.	"What I Like About You" (Studio Mix)	Palamarchuk; Skill; Marinos	2:31

LiveSOS — Physical version
No.	Title	Writer(s)	Length
15.	"What I Like About You / Pizza" (studio mix; hidden track)	Palamarchuk; Skill; Marinos	5:26

LiveSOS — iTunes version (bonus track)
No.	Title	Writer(s)	Length
10.	"Kiss Me Kiss Me"	Calum Hood; Luke Hemmings; John Feldmann; Gaskarth	3:31

LiveSOS — Target deluxe edition (bonus track)
No.	Title	Writer(s)	Length
10.	"Don't Stop"	Calum Hood; Luke Hemmings; Steve Robson; busbee	2:51

LiveSOS — Japan version (bonus tracks)
No.	Title	Writer(s)	Length
16.	"Don't Stop"	Calum Hood; Luke Hemmings; Robson; busbee	2:51
17.	"Kiss Me Kiss Me"	Calum Hood; Luke Hemmings; John Feldmann; Gaskarth	3:31
18.	"American Idiot" (studio mix)	Armstrong	3:06

Notes

- "Don't Stop" appears between "American Idiot" and "Teenage Dream" on the Target exclusive version
- "Kiss Me Kiss Me" appears between "American Idiot" and "Teenage Dream" on the iTunes version
- Physical releases of the album include the hidden live track "Pizza"

== Charts ==
=== Weekly charts ===
Chart (2014–15)	Peak position
Australian Albums (ARIA)	7
Belgian Albums (Ultratop Flanders)	41
Belgian Albums (Ultratop Wallonia)	128
Dutch Albums (Album Top 100)	26
French Albums (SNEP)	135
Greek Albums (IFPI)	7
Irish Albums (IRMA)	19
Italian Albums (FIMI)	25
New Zealand Albums (RMNZ)	23
Norwegian Albums (VG-lista)	32
Portuguese Albums (AFP)	30
Scottish Albums (Official Charts)	26
Spanish Albums (Promusicae)	33
Swiss Albums (Schweizer Hitparade)	65
UK Albums (Official Charts)	31
US Billboard 200	13
US Top Album Sales (Billboard)	10
US Digital Albums (Billboard)	6

=== Year-end charts ===
Chart (2014)	Position
Australian Artist Albums (ARIA)	30
Chart (2015)	Position
US Billboard 200	176

== Certifications ==
Region	Certification	Certified units/sales
Brazil (Pro-Música Brasil)	Platinum	40,000^{*}
^{*} Sales figures based on certification alone.
