= Unpredictable =

Unpredictable may refer to:

== Music ==
=== Albums ===
- Unpredictable (Jamie Foxx album) or the title song (see below), 2005
- Unpredictable (Malik B. album), 2015
- Unpredictable (Mystikal album) or the title song, 1997
- Unpredictable (Natalie Cole album), 1977
- Unpredictable, by Classified, 2000

=== Songs ===
- "Unpredictable" (Jamie Foxx song), 2005
- "Unpredictable" (Olly Murs and Louisa Johnson song), 2017
- "Unpredictable", by 5 Seconds of Summer from Somewhere New, 2012
- "Unpredictable", by Becky Hill, 2017
- "Unpredictable", by Jackson Yee, 2017
- "Unpredictable", by Keshia Chanté from Keshia Chanté, 2004
- "Unpredictable", by Skye Sweetnam from Noise from the Basement, 2004

== Television episodes ==
- "Unpredictable" (Beyblade X), 2024
- "Unpredictable" (Eureka), 2007

== See also ==
- Predictability
