= Rock Out with Your Socks Out Tour =

2014–15 concert tour by 5 Seconds of Summer

- Tour by 5 Seconds of Summer
- Promotional poster for the tour
- Location: Europe; North America; Oceania
- Associated album: 5 Seconds of Summer
- Start date: 13 November 2014
- End date: 13 September 2015
- Legs: 3
- No. of shows: 69
- Supporting act: Hey Violet

5 Seconds of Summer concert chronology
- There's No Place Like Home Tour (2014); Rock Out with Your Socks Out Tour (2015); Sounds Live Feels Live World Tour (2016)

The Rock Out with Your Socks Out Tour was the first headlining concert tour by the Australian pop rock band 5 Seconds of Summer, promoting the band's self-titled debut album. The pre-tour began on 13 November 2014 in Phoenix, Arizona, continuing in Los Angeles, and on 25 February 2015 in Tokyo, Japan. The remainder of the tour commenced on 4 May 2015 in Lisbon, Portugal, at Altice Arena and ended on 13 September 2015 in West Palm Beach, Florida.

== Background ==
In July 2014 the band, consisting of Luke Hemmings, Michael Clifford, Ashton Irwin, and Calum Hood, announced the European headlining dates, and later followed this up with announcements for both Australia and the US.

== Opening acts ==
- The Veronicas (Phoenix, Arizona and Los Angeles (pre-show dates))
- Hey Violet (Europe and North America)
- State Champs (Oceania)

== Tour dates ==
List of 2015 concerts
Date	City	Country	Venue	Opening acts	Attendance	Revenue
4 May 2015	Lisbon	Portugal	Altice Arena	Hey Violet	8,535 / 8,535	$353,500
6 May 2015	Madrid	Spain	Barclaycard Center	Hey Violet	8,407 / 8,407	$338,399
8 May 2015	Turin	Italy	Torino Palasport Olimpico	Hey Violet	8,838 / 8,838	$350,913
9 May 2015	Milan	Italy	Mediolanum Forum	Hey Violet	9,163 / 9,163	$341,328
10 May 2015	Zürich	Switzerland	Hallenstadion	Hey Violet	7,182 / 7,182	$538,466
12 May 2015	Copenhagen	Denmark	Forum Copenhagen	Hey Violet	6,945 / 6,945	$402,202
13 May 2015	Stockholm	Sweden	Ericsson Globe	Hey Violet	10,751 / 10,751	$518,774
14 May 2015	Oslo	Norway	Oslo Spektrum	Hey Violet	6,779 / 6,779	$359,240
16 May 2015	Berlin	Germany	O_{2} World	Hey Violet	10,781 / 11,702	$412,154
17 May 2015	Munich	Germany	Olympiahalle	Hey Violet	8,219 / 8,219	$365,183
18 May 2015	Oberhausen	Germany	König Pilsener Arena	Hey Violet	9,672 / 9,672	$443,242
20 May 2015	Amsterdam	Netherlands	Ziggo Dome	Hey Violet	11,861 / 11,861	$495,137
21 May 2015	Brussels	Belgium	Palais 12	Hey Violet	8,384 / 8,384	$383,957
22 May 2015	Paris	France	Zénith de Paris	Hey Violet	5,436 / 5,436	$231,016
23 May 2015	Norwich	England	Earlham Park	—N/a	—N/a	—N/a
28 May 2015	Dublin	Ireland	3Arena	Hey Violet	18,560 / 18,560	$805,739
29 May 2015	Dublin	Ireland	3Arena	Hey Violet	18,560 / 18,560	$805,739
30 May 2015	Belfast	Northern Ireland	Odyssey Arena	Hey Violet	8,183 / 8,183	$396,985
1 June 2015	Glasgow	Scotland	The SSE Hydro	Hey Violet	11,108 / 11,108	$571,889
2 June 2015	Newcastle	England	Metro Radio Arena	Hey Violet	9,153 / 9,153	$478,250
3 June 2015	Leeds	England	First Direct Arena	Hey Violet	11,053 / 11,053	$572,733
5 June 2015	Birmingham	England	Barclaycard Arena	Hey Violet	24,565 / 24,565	$1,272,940
6 June 2015	Birmingham	England	Barclaycard Arena	Hey Violet	24,565 / 24,565	$1,272,940
7 June 2015	Cardiff	Wales	Motorpoint Arena Cardiff	Hey Violet	7,500 / 7,500	$239,189
9 June 2015	Manchester	England	Manchester Arena	Hey Violet	13,239 / 13,239	$683,245
10 June 2015	Liverpool	England	Echo Arena Liverpool	Hey Violet	9,152 / 9,152	$481,660
12 June 2015	London	England	The SSE Arena	Hey Violet	31,211 / 31,211	$1,662,460
13 June 2015^{[d]}	London	England	The SSE Arena	Hey Violet	31,211 / 31,211	$1,662,460
14 June 2015	London	England	The SSE Arena	Hey Violet	31,211 / 31,211	$1,662,460
18 June 2015	Auckland	New Zealand	Vector Arena	State Champs	8,675 / 8,675	$488,584
20 June 2015	Sydney	Australia	Allphones Arena	State Champs	13,128 / 13,128	$806,856
23 June 2015	Brisbane	Australia	Brisbane Entertainment Centre	State Champs	9,340 / 9,340	$573,459
25 June 2015	Melbourne	Australia	Rod Laver Arena	State Champs	11,259 / 11,259	$714,987
27 June 2015	Adelaide	Australia	Adelaide Entertainment Centre	State Champs	7,508 / 7,508	$469,699
29 June 2015	Perth	Australia	Perth Arena	State Champs	9,842 / 9,842	$600,988
17 July 2015	Las Vegas	United States	Mandalay Bay Events Center	Hey Violet	8,359 / 8,452	$660,082
18 July 2015	Chula Vista	United States	Sleep Train Amphitheatre	Hey Violet	11,068 / 19,406	$520,569
20 July 2015	Irvine	United States	Verizon Wireless Amphitheatre	Hey Violet	14,737 / 14,823	$744,594
21 July 2015	Concord	United States	Concord Pavilion	Hey Violet	10,378 / 12,331	$435,178
22 July 2015	Mountain View	United States	Shoreline Amphitheater	Hey Violet	15,642 / 22,000	$475,024
24 July 2015	Seattle	United States	KeyArena	Hey Violet	11,395 / 11,813	$638,574
25 July 2015	Vancouver	Canada	Rogers Arena	Hey Violet	9,933 / 13,326	$531,734
27 July 2015	Edmonton	Canada	Rexall Place	Hey Violet	11,407 / 12,418	$604,177
29 July 2015	Winnipeg	Canada	MTS Centre	Hey Violet	7,740 / 11,186	$391,835
31 July 2015	St. Paul	United States	Xcel Energy Center	Hey Violet	13,626 / 14,205	$798,934
1 August 2015	Tinley Park	United States	First Midwest Bank Amphitheatre	Hey Violet	30,609 / 57,092	$1,252,026
2 August 2015	Tinley Park	United States	First Midwest Bank Amphitheatre	Hey Violet	30,609 / 57,092	$1,252,026
4 August 2015	Louisville	United States	KFC Yum! Center	Hey Violet	13,120 / 15,284	$743,678
5 August 2015	Atlanta	United States	Aaron's Amphitheatre	Hey Violet	17,214 / 18,644	$642,400
7 August 2015	Dallas	United States	Gexa Energy Pavilion	Hey Violet	20,340 / 20,382	$802,041
8 August 2015	The Woodlands	United States	Cynthia Woods Mitchell Pavilion	Hey Violet	16,416 / 16,416	$677,821
19 August 2015	Auburn Hills	United States	The Palace of Auburn Hills	Hey Violet	13,206 / 13,361	$769,481
21 August 2015	Cleveland	United States	Quicken Loans Arena	Hey Violet	12,349 / 14,075	$732,114
22 August 2015	Noblesville	United States	Klipsch Music Center	Hey Violet	14,810 / 23,348	$438,488
23 August 2015	Burgettstown	United States	First Niagara Pavilion	Hey Violet	10,879 / 22,945	$404,540
25 August 2015	Toronto	Canada	Molson Canadian Amphitheatre	Hey Violet	15,686 / 15,741	$587,361
26 August 2015	Saratoga Springs	United States	Saratoga Performing Arts Center	Hey Violet	8,907 / 24,993	$402,873
28 August 2015	Mansfield	United States	Xfinity Center	Hey Violet	19,183 / 19,647	$766,110
29 August 2015	Hershey	United States	Hersheypark Stadium	Hey Violet	22,151 / 24,077	$1,124,163
30 August 2015	Holmdel	United States	PNC Bank Arts Center	Hey Violet	16,808 / 16,808	$656,630
1 September 2015	Wantagh	United States	Nikon at Jones Beach Theater	Hey Violet	22,750 / 27,405	$1,446,727
2 September 2015	Wantagh	United States	Nikon at Jones Beach Theater	Hey Violet	22,750 / 27,405	$1,446,727
4 September 2015	Camden	United States	BB&T Pavilion	Hey Violet	13,180 / 24,581	$522,884
5 September 2015	Hartford	United States	Xfinity Theatre	Hey Violet	11,917 / 23,922	$458,585
6 September 2015	Bristow	United States	Jiffy Lube Live	Hey Violet	13,141 / 22,368	$666,552
7 September 2015	Virginia Beach	United States	Farm Bureau Live	Hey Violet	7,127 / 19,943	$309,204
9 September 2015	Charlotte	United States	PNC Music Pavilion	Hey Violet	11,739 / 18,441	$513,631
10 September 2015	Raleigh	United States	Walnut Creek Amphitheatre	Hey Violet	8,806 / 19,836	$296,743
12 September 2015^{[b]}	Tampa	United States	MidFlorida Credit Union Amphitheatre	Hey Violet	16,027 / 19,147	$618,493
13 September 2015	West Palm Beach	United States	Perfect Vodka Amphitheatre	Hey Violet	11,911 / 19,288	$440,374
Total					782,735 / 959,820	$37,427,794

== Notes ==
^{a} Extra date added on 15 June 2015 due to demand.

^{b} Extra date added on 10 September 2015 due to demand.

^{c} The 23 May 2015 concert in Norwich, England was a part of Radio 1's Big Weekend.

^{d} Guitarist Michael Clifford incurred burns to his head and left side of his face during "She Looks So Perfect". As a result of his injuries, the band didn't complete the encore.

^{e} During the BBC Radio 1's Big Weekend, lead singer and guitarist Luke Hemmings had a case of laryngitis, but proceeded to perform.

^{f} During the band's show in Holmdel, New Jersey on 30 August 2015, the band found out onstage that they had won the Video Music Award for "She's Kinda Hot" being Song of the Summer.
