= Michael Morales (musician) =

American musician (born 1963)

- Born: April 25, 1963 (age 62)
- Origin: San Antonio, Texas, United States
- Genres: Rock, pop
- Occupations: Singer-songwriter, record producer
- Instruments: Guitar, drums, keyboards, vocals, bass guitar
- Years active: 1980–present
- Labels: PolyGram Records; Major/MTM Records
- Website: moralesacademy.com

Michael Morales (born April 25, 1963) is an American musician most known for the top 40-charting songs "Who Do You Give Your Love To?" (No. 15 Billboard Hot 100) and a cover version of the Romantics' "What I Like About You" (No. 28 Hot 100).

== Early life ==
Born in San Antonio, Texas, Morales came from a musical family (his father Henry met his mother, Felicia when the two were to perform together on a radio broadcast). As a child, Morales formed and played guitar, drums and piano in several bands including Crimson Sash. In 1980, he founded the popular band, the Max, in which he would perform until signing his first recording contract with Universal Music Group in 1988.

== Career ==
Morales' debut album, the self-titled Michael Morales, was released by Mercury/Republic Records in 1989. It garnered MTV airplay and landed three hit singles on the Billboard Hot 100 chart, including "Who Do You Give Your Love To?", which peaked at No. 15 on the Billboard Hot 100, and "What I Like About You" at No. 28. Before releasing his second album on Universal titled Thump (1991), he founded Studio M in San Antonio. He and brother Ron Morales have won four Grammy awards for records produced and recorded at Studio M. In 2000, Morales released his third CD on Major/MTM Records entitled That's the Way.

Aside from chart success, Morales's music can be heard in a number of feature films, including the 2000 Woody Allen film Picking Up the Pieces and the Cannes Film Festival winner The Three Burials of Melquiades Estrada, from 2005.

Morales has also worked with several big names such as Beyoncé, Def Leppard, Selena, Cee Lo Green, and more.

To date, Morales's works have been nominated for six Grammy Awards, four of which won.

== Current life ==
Morales resides in San Antonio with his wife and two children. His other brother is former Texas state attorney general Dan Morales. He has his own music lesson business in San Antonio, called the Michael Morales Rockstar Academy and Rock Music Institute.

== Discography ==
=== Studio albums ===
- 1989: Michael Morales
- 1991: Thump
- 1999: That's the Way

=== Singles ===
Year	Single	Peak chart positions	Album(s)
Year	Single	USA Hot 100	Album(s)
1989	"Who Do You Give Your Love To?"	15	Michael Morales
1989	"What I Like About You"	28	Michael Morales
1989	"I Don't Know"	81	Michael Morales
1991	"I Don't Wanna See You"	73	Thump
