= Kiss Me Kiss Me (song) =

Promotional single by 5 Seconds of Summer

from the album 5 Seconds of Summer
- Released: 17 June 2014
- Genre: Pop punk
- Length: 3:23
- Label: Capitol; Hi or Hey
- Songwriter(s): Alex Gaskarth; Luke Hemmings; Calum Hood; John Feldmann
- Producer(s): Feldmann

"Kiss Me Kiss Me" is a song by Australian pop rock band 5 Seconds of Summer. It was released on 17 June 2014 as the first promotional single from their debut self-titled studio album.

== Composition ==
"Kiss Me Kiss Me" was written by Luke Hemmings and Calum Hood while production was handled by John Feldmann, who also co-wrote the track. The song was also co-written by Alex Gaskarth of All Time Low. According to the sheet music published at Musicnotes.com, by Alfred Music Publishing, the track runs at 144 BPM and is in the key of C major. Hemmings and Hood's range in the song spans from the notes G4 to A5.

== Reception ==
"Kiss Me Kiss Me" was met with positive reviews from music critics. Christina Garibaldi of MTV stated, "The guys are creating some perfect 'teenage memories,' as they sing about getting in one last kiss before saying goodbye." Jason Lipshutz of Billboard gave mixed review of the track remarking, "The hook on 'Kiss Me Kiss Me' may be a slight downturn from the preceding tracks on 5 Seconds of Summer, but the earnest harmonies push the track list forward."

== Personnel ==
Credits for "Kiss Me Kiss Me" adapted from AllMusic.

5 Seconds of Summer

- Luke Hemmings – lead vocals, rhythm guitar
- Calum Hood – lead vocals, bass guitar
- Michael Clifford – lead guitar, backing vocals
- Ashton Irwin – drums, backing vocals

Production

- John Feldmann – producer, mixing, recording
- Alex Gaskarth – composer
- Chris Qualls – assistant
- Bunt Stafford-Clark – mastering

== Charts ==
Chart performance for "Kiss Me Kiss Me"
| Chart (2014) | Peak position |
|---|---|
| Australia (ARIA) | 14 |
| Austria (Ö3 Austria Top 40) | 49 |
| Belgium (Ultratop 50 Flanders) | 29 |
| Belgium (Ultratop 50 Wallonia) | 49 |
| Canada (Canadian Hot 100) | 26 |
| Denmark (Tracklisten) | 7 |
| France (SNEP) | 62 |
| Ireland (IRMA) | 54 |
| Japan (Japan Hot 100) (Billboard) | 56 |
| Netherlands (Single Top 100) | 37 |
| New Zealand (Recorded Music NZ) | 10 |
| Scotland (OCC) | 68 |
| Spain (PROMUSICAE) | 24 |
| Sweden Digital Song Sales (Billboard) | 3 |
| UK Singles (OCC) | 110 |
| US Billboard Hot 100 | 28 |
