= Everything I Didn't Say (5 Seconds of Summer song) =

2014 single by 5 Seconds of Summer

Promotional single by 5 Seconds of Summer

from the album 5 Seconds of Summer
- Released: 25 June 2014
- Genre: Pop rock
- Length: 3:00
- Label: Capitol; Hi or Hey
- Songwriter(s): Ashton Irwin; Calum Hood; John Feldmann; Nick Furlong
- Producer(s): Feldmann

"Everything I Didn't Say" is a song by Australian pop rock band 5 Seconds of Summer. It was released on 25 June 2014 as the second promotional single from their debut self-titled studio album.

== Background and composition ==
On 25 June 2014, the track was released as a promotional single. The song was made available for fans who pre-ordered the album on iTunes. The song is about the feeling of remorse you feel when you are unable to tell someone the way you feel for them. Bassist Calum Hood stated, "It's about after a relationship has ended, and you wish you had been a better person."

"Everything I Didn't Say" was written by Ashton Irwin, Calum Hood, John Feldmann and Nick Furlong, while production was handled by Feldmann. The track has been described as a mid-tempo pop-rock song, with a BPM count of 87, and its key is A Major.

== Critical reception ==
Jason Lipshutz of Billboard praised the production on the track but criticized the "cliched lyrics" of "Everything I Didn't Say" that prevented the song from "hitting its mark."

== Personnel ==
Credits for "Everything I Didn't Say" adapted from AllMusic.

5 Seconds of Summer

- Luke Hemmings – lead vocals, rhythm guitar
- Calum Hood – lead vocals, bass guitar
- Michael Clifford – lead vocals, lead guitar
- Ashton Irwin – drums, backing vocals

Production

- John Feldmann – producer, mixing, recording
- Chris Qualls – assistant
- Bunt Stafford-Clark – mastering

== Charts ==
Chart performance for "Everything I Didn't Say"
Chart (2014)	Peak position
Australia (ARIA)	11
Austria (Ö3 Austria Top 40)	44
Belgium (Ultratop 50 Flanders)	31
Belgium (Ultratop 50 Wallonia)	48
Canada (Canadian Hot 100)	18
Denmark (Tracklisten)	8
France (SNEP)	59
Ireland (IRMA)	97
Netherlands (Single Top 100)	36
New Zealand (Recorded Music NZ)	8
Scotland (OCC)	81
Spain (PROMUSICAE)	22
Sweden Digital Song Sales (Billboard)	2
UK Singles (OCC)	130
US Billboard Hot 100	24
