= Somewhere New (EP) =

EP by 5 Seconds of Summer
- Released: 7 December 2012
- Length: 17:08
- Label: Capitol
- Producer: Joel Chapman; Louis Schrool

5 Seconds of Summer chronology
Unplugged (2012)	Somewhere New (2012)	5 Seconds of Summer (2014)

Singles from Somewhere New
- 1. "Out of My Limit" Released: 19 November 2012

Somewhere New is the debut extended play by Australian pop rock band 5 Seconds of Summer. The EP was released on 7 December 2012. The group toured across Australia in support of the EP.

== Background and release ==
On 8 November 2012, the group revealed the cover art for Somewhere New. The band released their debut and lead single from their EP, "Out of My Limit" on 19 November 2012. The single was only released in Australia and New Zealand. A music video for the song was released on 26 November. "Beside You" was re-recorded for the band's self titled debut studio album (2014). Physical copies of the EP were only available in Australia during this time until in October 2016, the EP was released digitally worldwide via Capitol Records.

== Commercial performance ==
Somewhere New debuted at number 36 on the New Zealand Albums chart. The EP also peaked at number 97 on the US Top Current Album Sales chart. In 2021, Somewhere New was certified gold by the Australian Recording Industry Association denoting sales of 35,000 units.

== Track listing ==
No.	Title	Writer(s)	Producer(s)	Length
1.	"Unpredictable"	Joel Chapman; Calum Hood; Luke Hemmings; Christian Lo Russo	Joel Chapman; Louis Schrool	3:04
2.	"Out of My Limit"	Hood; Hemmings	Chapman; Schrool	3:13
3.	"Beside You"	Chapman; Hood; Hemmings; Lo Russo	Chapman; Schrool	3:43
4.	"Gotta Get Out"	Hood	Chapman; Schrool	3:41
Total length:				17:08

== Personnel ==
5 Seconds of Summer

- Luke Hemmings – lead vocals, rhythm guitar
- Calum Hood – lead vocals, bass guitar
- Michael Clifford – lead guitar, backing vocals
- Ashton Irwin – drums, backing vocals

Production

- Joel Chapman – co-producer
- Christian Lo Russo – composer
- Joel Vanderuit – layout, design
- Andrew Edgson – mastering
- Mark Needham – mixing
- Angelo Kehagias – photography
- Louis Schrool – producer
- 5 Seconds of Summer – artwork

== Charts ==
Chart performance for Somewhere New
Chart (2013–16)	Peak position
New Zealand Albums (RMNZ)	36
UK Physical Singles (OCC)	5
US Top Current Albums Sales (Billboard)	97

== Certifications ==
Region	Certification	Certified units/sales
Australia (ARIA)	Gold	35,000^{‡}
^{‡} Sales+streaming figures based on certification alone.

== Release history ==
Release history for Somewhere New
Region	Date	Format	Label	Ref.
Australia	7 December 2012	Digital download	5 Seconds of Summer	
New Zealand	7 December 2012	Digital download	5 Seconds of Summer	
Australia	7 December 2012	CD	5 Seconds of Summer	
Various	23 October 2016	Digital download	Capitol	
