= What I Like About You (The Romantics song) =

1979 single by The Romantics

Single by the Romantics

from the album The Romantics
- B-side: "First in Line"
- Released: December 1979
- Recorded: September 1979
- Studio: Coconuts Recording (Miami Beach)
- Genre: Power pop; pop rock; new wave
- Length: 2:55; 2:49 (music video)
- Label: Nemperor; Epic
- Songwriters: Wally Palmar; Mike Skill; Jimmy Marinos
- Producer: Pete Solley

The Romantics singles chronology
"Tell It to Carrie" (1978)	"What I Like About You" (1979)	"When I Look in Your Eyes" (1980)

Music video
- "What I Like About You" on YouTube

"What I Like About You" is a song by American rock band the Romantics, released in December 1979 as the lead single from their 1980 self-titled debut album. The song was written by band members Wally Palmar, Mike Skill and Jimmy Marinos; Marinos, the band's drummer, is also the lead vocalist on the song. The band filmed a music video for the song that appeared frequently on MTV during the early 1980s.

Covers of the song include versions by Michael Morales in 1989, by Lillix in 2003 on the Freaky Friday soundtrack as well as in The WB comedy series What I Like About You, and by 5 Seconds of Summer for their 2014 self-titled debut album.

== Background ==
"What I Like About You" was written by Palmar, Marinos and Skill around a guitar part by Skill. The Romantics recorded the song and the accompanying album at Coconuts Recording Studio in Miami Beach, Florida.

It reached number 49 on the Billboard Hot 100. The song was most successful in Australia, where it reached number two on the Australian Singles Chart (Kent Music Report) for two weeks and became the 13th most successful single for 1980.

== Guitar Hero lawsuit ==
In November 2007, the Romantics filed a federal lawsuit against Activision, the publisher of Guitar Hero Encore: Rocks the 80s, claiming that the video game manufacturer had infringed on the band's rights by featuring a soundalike recording of "What I Like About You" in the game. The Romantics lost their case in December 2007, with the judge stating that Activision had taken all the necessary steps in developing its product.

== Charts ==
=== Weekly charts ===
Weekly chart performance for "What I Like About You"
Chart (1979–1980)	Peak position
Australia (Kent Music Report)	2
US Billboard Hot 100	49
US Cash Box Top 100	53

Chart (2011)	Peak position
US Rock Digital Songs	46

=== Year-end charts ===
Year-end chart performance for "What I Like About You"
Chart (1980)	Position
Australia (Kent Music Report)	13

== Certifications and sales ==
Region	Certification	Certified units/sales
Australia (ARIA)	Gold	50,000^{^}
^{^} Shipments figures based on certification alone.

== Cover versions ==
=== Michael Morales version ===
Michael Morales released a version of "What I Like About You" in 1989, as the follow-up to his hit "Who Do You Give Your Love To". His version reached number 28 on the Billboard Hot 100, eclipsing the position of the original version.

=== Poison version ===
"What I Like About You" was covered by American rock band Poison as the lead single from their cover album Poison'd! (2007). The band released a music video for the single.

=== 5 Seconds of Summer version ===
"What I Like About You"

Single by 5 Seconds of Summer

from the EP She Looks So Perfect and the album LiveSOS
- Released: December 2, 2014
- Recorded: 2013–2014
- Genre: Pop rock; power pop
- Length: 2:31
- Label: Capitol
- Songwriters: Wally Palmar; Mike Skill; Jimmy Marinos
- Producer: John Feldmann

5 Seconds of Summer singles chronology
"Good Girls" (2014)	"What I Like About You" (2014)	"She's Kinda Hot" (2015)

Music video
- "What I Like About You" (live at the Forum) on YouTube

The song was covered by Australian pop rock band 5 Seconds of Summer for their 2014 She Looks So Perfect EP, reaching number 137 on the UK Singles Chart. The studio mix of the song is included on the group's 2014 live album LiveSOS, and was serviced to American mainstream radio on December 2, 2014, as its lead single. It received strong airplay for the week ending December 28, 2014 and debuted on the Billboard Pop Songs chart, where it has since peaked at number 30.

The band performed the song live at the 2014 American Music Awards on November 23, 2014, ahead of its release. They also performed the song live on Good Morning America on August 21, 2015, in promotion of their new single She's Kinda Hot.

==== Music video ====
A lyric video for the live version was uploaded to 5 Seconds of Summer's Vevo account November 23, 2014, the same day as their AMA performance. The official music video was directed by Tom van Schelven and premiered on December 5, 2014. It uses the live audio rather than the studio mix and features concert footage from the group's performance at The Forum near Los Angeles, as well behind-the-scenes clips and shots of the audience.

==== Charts ====
Chart (2014–2015)	Peak position
Belgium (Ultratip Bubbling Under Flanders)	76
UK Singles (OCC)	137
US Pop Airplay (Billboard)	30

==== Certifications ====
Certifications for "What I Like About You (Live In LA)"
Region	Certification	Certified units/sales
Australia (ARIA)	Gold	35,000^{‡}
^{‡} Sales+streaming figures based on certification alone.
