= Good Girls (5 Seconds of Summer song) =

Single by 5 Seconds of Summer

from the album 5 Seconds of Summer
- Released: 17 November 2014
- Recorded: 2013
- Genre: Pop-punk; pop rock; power pop
- Length: 3:10
- Label: Capitol; Hi or Hey
- Songwriters: Michael Clifford; Ashton Irwin; Roy Stride; Josh Wilkinson; John Feldmann; Rick Parkhouse; George Tizzard
- Producer: John Feldmann

5 Seconds of Summer singles chronology
"Amnesia" (2014)	"Good Girls" (2014)	"What I Like About You" (2014)

Music video
- "Good Girls" on YouTube

"Good Girls" is a song by Australian pop rock band 5 Seconds of Summer, taken from their 2014 self-titled debut album. The song was written by Michael Clifford, Ashton Irwin, Roy Stride, Josh Wilkinson, John Feldmann and Red Triangle's Rick Parkhouse and George Tizzard. The song was announced as the fourth single off their debut album on 7 October 2014.

== Promotion ==
5 Seconds of Summer performed "Good Girls" on the Australian version of The X Factor's live results show on last 6 October. They also performed "Good Girls" on The Ellen DeGeneres Show.

== Music video ==
On 7 October 2014, the band started to tease the music video by direct messaging several fans on Twitter about the release date of the video. Then they tweeted the first teaser to fans who did not get the direct message on their Twitter account. On 8 October 2014, they tweeted the second teaser of the music video. The video was released on 10 October 2014. The video was filmed at Lincoln Heights Jail.

== Extended play ==
The extended play was released in 2014 which contains four tracks: "Good Girls" (single version), "Just Saying", "Long Way Home" (acoustic), and "Good Girls" (acoustic).

== Track listing ==
CD single and digital EP
No.	Title	Writer(s)	Producer(s)	Length
1.	"Good Girls" (single version)	Michael Clifford; John Feldmann; Ashton Irwin; Rick Parkhouse; Roy Stride; George Tizzard; Josh Wilkinson	Feldmann	3:10
2.	"Just Saying"	Irwin; Stride; Clifford		2:39
3.	"Long Way Home" (acoustic)	Irwin; Clifford; Feldmann; Alex Gaskarth		3:17
4.	"Good Girls" (acoustic)	Irwin; Clifford		3:04

iTunes EP
No.	Title	Writer(s)	Producer(s)	Length
1.	"Good Girls" (single version)	Irwin; Clifford; Parkhouse; Tizzard; Stride; Wilkinson; Feldmann	Feldmann	3:10
2.	"Just Saying"			2:39
3.	"Long Way Home" (Acoustic)	Irwin; Clifford; Feldmann; Gaskarth		3:17
4.	"Good Girls" (Live from iTunes Festival)	Irwin; Clifford; Parkhouse; Tizzard; Stride; Wilkinson		2:39

== Personnel ==
- Luke Hemmings – lead vocals, rhythm guitar
- Michael Clifford – lead vocals, lead guitar
- Calum Hood – lead vocals, bass guitar
- Ashton Irwin – lead vocals, drums

== Charts ==
=== Weekly charts ===
Chart (2014)	Peak position
Australia (ARIA)	19
Belgium (Ultratop 50 Flanders)	42
Canada (Canadian Hot 100)	27
Denmark (Tracklisten)	18
France (SNEP)	97
Ireland (IRMA)	12
Netherlands (Single Top 100)	88
New Zealand (Recorded Music NZ)	15
Spain (PROMUSICAE)	43
Sweden Digital Song Sales (Billboard)	3
UK Singles (OCC)	19
US Billboard Hot 100	34

=== Year-end charts ===
Chart (2014)	Position
Australian Artist Singles (ARIA)	50

== Certifications ==
Region	Certification	Certified units/sales
Australia (ARIA)	Platinum	70,000^{‡}
United Kingdom (BPI)	Silver	200,000^{‡}
United States (RIAA)	Platinum	1,000,000^{‡}
^{‡} Sales+streaming figures based on certification alone.

== Release history ==
Region	Date	Format	Record label
Worldwide	17 November 2014	CD; digital download	Capitol; Hi or Hey
