= 5 Seconds of Summer (album) =

2014 studio album by 5 Seconds of Summer

Studio album by 5 Seconds of Summer
- Released: 27 June 2014
- Recorded: 2013–14
- Genres: Pop-punk; power pop; pop rock
- Length: 39:25
- Labels: Capitol; Hi or Hey
- Producers: Louis Biancaniello; Michael Biancaniello; Joel Chapman; John Feldmann; Steve Robson; Jake Sinclair; Sam Watters; Red Triangle Productions

5 Seconds of Summer chronology
Somewhere New (2012)	5 Seconds of Summer (2014)	LiveSOS (2014)

Singles from 5 Seconds of Summer
- 1. "She Looks So Perfect" Released: 21 February 2014; 2. "Don't Stop" Released: 9 May 2014; 3. "Amnesia" Released: 15 July 2014; 4. "Good Girls" Released: 17 November 2014

5 Seconds of Summer is the debut studio album by Australian pop rock band 5 Seconds of Summer. It was released by Capitol Records on 27 June 2014 in Europe and on 22 July 2014 in the United States, Mexico, and Canada. The album was supported by four singles: "She Looks So Perfect", "Don't Stop", "Amnesia", and "Good Girls". Musically, the album is rooted in the pop punk, pop rock and power pop genres. Before the album's release, the band was the opening act for One Direction in 2013 on their Take Me Home Tour. To promote the album, 5 Seconds of Summer embarked on their first global headlining tour, entitled Rock Out with Your Socks Out Tour, between May and September 2015.

== Singles ==
"She Looks So Perfect" was released on 21 February 2014 as the lead single from the album. The lead track peaked at number one on the Australian Singles Chart, New Zealand Singles Chart, Irish Singles Chart and the UK Singles Chart. The single also peaked at number 24 on the Billboard Hot 100 and number 25 on the Canadian Hot 100. It was certified triple platinum by the Australian Recording Industry Association (ARIA), double platinum by Recording Industry Association of America (RIAA), and platinum by both Recorded Music New Zealand and British Phonographic Industry.

"Don't Stop" was released as the second single on 9 May 2014. It went number one in New Zealand, Ireland and Scotland. It also peaked at number two in the UK and number three in Australia and Spain. It was certified gold by BPI and RIAA as well as double platinum by ARIA.

"Amnesia" was released as the third single on 15 July 2014. It peaked at number three in Spain and Ireland, number five in Scotland, number six in New Zealand and Denmark, and number seven in Australia and the UK. It was certified double platinum by ARIA and platinum by RIAA.

"Good Girls" was announced as the fourth single from the album on 6 October 2014. It was originally released as the album's first promotional single. It was released as an official single on 10 October 2014, the same day its official music video premiered. It peaked in the top 20 in Ireland, New Zealand, the UK, and Australia. It was certified gold by RIAA.

=== Promotional singles ===
"Kiss Me Kiss Me" was released as the second promotional single. It peaked at number 10 in New Zealand and number 14 in Australia while also charting in Canada, the Netherlands, and the United States.

"Everything I Didn't Say" was released as the final promotional single and peaked at number 24 on the Billboard Hot 100, number 11 in Australia, number 8 in New Zealand, and number 36 in the Netherlands.

== Critical reception ==
Professional ratings
Aggregate scores
Source	Rating
AnyDecentMusic?	5.7/10
Metacritic	65/100
Review scores
Source	Rating
AllMusic	3.5/5 stars
Alternative Press	3.5/5 stars
Billboard	4/5 stars
The Guardian	3/5 stars
Rolling Stone	3/5 stars

On Metacritic, which assigns a rating out of 100 reviews from mainstream critics, the album gained an average score of 65. This was based on 10 reviews, indicating "generally favorable reviews". On AllMusic, the album was given a 3.5 star rating out of 5. The album was praised for having "hummable melodies that anyone over 30 will probably feel slightly guilty for remembering" and songs with "a catchy chorus." Evan Lucy of Alternative Press said, "no one will argue 5 Seconds Of Summer is high art, but it ultimately works more often than it doesn’t. And perhaps most important of all, it feels authentic." He ended off stating, "these songs are awash in live drums and real instruments proves 5 Seconds Of Summer want to rock as much as they want to reach Top 40 crowds." Jason Lipshutz of Billboard praised songs such as "Don’t Stop", "Good Girls", "18" and "Mrs. All American" for their "tight songwriting and lyrical wit." He also complimented producer John Feldmann for his "clean and compact" work on the album. He finished off stating, "Overall, 5 Seconds of Summer is a delightful debut from a group that cannot be easily pigeonholed, and is worth paying attention to."

In December 2021, the album was listed at no. 17 in Rolling Stone Australia’s ‘200 Greatest Albums of All Time’ countdown.

== Commercial performance ==
In the United States, the album debuted at number one on the Billboard 200, with first-week sales of 259,000 copies, the biggest first-week sales for a debut album by a group since Daughtry's self-titled album in 2006. 5 Seconds of Summer is the first Australian act to achieve a number-one album with their debut album. The album has sold 734,000 copies in the United States as of September 2015.

The album peaked at number one in 14 countries, including their native Australia; it was also certified platinum in four countries, and gold in ten other countries.

== Track listing ==
5 Seconds of Summer track listing
No.	Title	Writer(s)	Producer(s)	Length
1.	"She Looks So Perfect"	Ashton Irwin; Michael Clifford; Jake Sinclair	Jake Sinclair; Eric Valentine^{[a]}	3:22
2.	"Don't Stop"	Calum Hood; Luke Hemmings; Steve Robson; busbee	Steve Robson	2:49
3.	"Good Girls"	Irwin; Clifford; John Feldmann; Josh Wilkinson; Roy Stride; Rick Parkhouse; George Tizzard	John Feldmann	3:27
4.	"Kiss Me Kiss Me"	Hood; Hemmings; Feldmann; Alex Gaskarth	Feldmann	3:23
5.	"18"	Hemmings; Clifford; Richard Stannard; Seton Daunt; Roy Stride; Ash Howes	Feldmann	3:09
6.	"Everything I Didn't Say"	Irwin; Hood; Feldmann; Nick Furlong	Feldmann	3:00
7.	"Beside You"	Hood; Hemmings; Christian Lo Russo; Joel Chapman	Feldmann^{[a]}	3:40
8.	"End Up Here"	Irwin; Clifford; Feldmann; Gaskarth	Feldmann	3:01
9.	"Long Way Home"	Irwin; Clifford; Feldmann; Gaskarth	Feldmann	3:19
10.	"Heartbreak Girl"	Hood; Hemmings; Robson; Lindy Robbins	Robson	3:18
11.	"English Love Affair^{[b]}"	Irwin; Clifford; Stride; Wilkinson; Parkhouse; Tizzard	Red Triangle Productions; Feldmann^{[a]}	3:00
12.	"Amnesia"	Benji Madden; Joel Madden; Louis Biancaniello; Michael Biancaniello; Sam Watters	Louis Biancaniello; Michael Biancaniello; Sam Watters	3:57
Total length:				39:25

Deluxe edition track listing
No.	Title	Writer(s)	Producer(s)	Length
13.	"Social Casualty"	Hemmings; Clifford; Feldmann; Nick Furlong	John Feldmann	3:08
14.	"Never Be"	Hemmings; Hood; Clifford; Irwin; Feldmann	Feldmann	3:08
15.	"Voodoo Doll"	Hood; Irwin; Adam Argyle; Fiona Bevan	Feldmann	3:17
Total length:				48:58

5 Seconds of Summer (B-Sides and Rarities) track listing
No.	Title	Writer(s)	Producer(s)	Length
1.	"Lost Boy"	Hood; Hemmings; Stride; Rogers	MSTR Rogers	3:28
2.	"Mrs All American"	Hood; Clifford; Golan; Robson	Robson	2:39
3.	"English Love Affair"	Irwin; Clifford; Stride; Wilkinson; Parkhouse; Tizzard	Red Triangle Productions; Feldmann^{[a]}	3:00
4.	"Never Be"	Hemmings; Hood; Clifford; Irwin; Feldmann	Feldmann	3:08
5.	"Voodoo Doll"	Hood; Irwin; Adam Argyle; Bevan	Feldmann	3:17
6.	"Greenlight"	Clifford; Irwin; Bourne; Robson	Robson	2:45
7.	"Tomorrow Never Dies"	Hood; Irwin; Feldmann	Feldmann	2:52
8.	"Independence Day"	Hood; Irwin; Feldmann; Furlong	Feldmann	3:37
9.	"Close as Strangers"	Clifford; Irwin; Parkhouse; Stride; Tizzard; Wilkinson	Feldmann	3:19
10.	"Out of My Limit"	Hemmings; Hood	Feldmann	3:16
Total length:				31:21

Notes

- ^{^[a]} signifies an additional producer
- ^{^[b]} the eleventh track varies depending on the region: the international edition features "English Love Affair", the North American release includes "Mrs All American", while the Australian and New Zealand versions feature "Lost Boy".
- The B-Sides and Rarities compilation was released on December 3, 2016 and features tracks that were originally released as bonus tracks on various editions of the album. It notoriously omits the Deluxe edition bonus track "Social Casualty".
  - Track 6 was originally released as the iTunes and Apple Music Deluxe edition bonus track;
  - Tracks 7-10 were originally released as the Target edition bonus tracks.
- Two versions of the album were released in Japan. Both include eight bonus tracks, three of which are the Deluxe edition tracks, and the rest are the singles' b-sides, which vary on each version:
  - The regular Japan edition features "Heartache On the Big Screen", "The Only Reason" and "What I Like About You" from "She Looks So Perfect", as well as "Rejects" and "Try Hard" from "Don't Stop". It also includes bonus DVD with music videos for "She Looks So Perfect" and "Don't Stop" and the behind-the-scene footage of the former.
  - Japan Tour edition includes "Disconnected" and "Wherever You Are" from "She Looks So Perfect"; "Wrapped Around Your Finger" from "Don't Stop"; "Daylight" from "Amnesia" and "Just Saying" from "Good Girls".

== Personnel ==
Credits adapted from the CD liner notes.

5 Seconds of Summer

- Luke Hemmings – rhythm guitar (all tracks), lead and backing vocals (all tracks)
- Calum Hood – bass guitar, backing vocals (all tracks), lead vocals (tracks 1–15, 17–20)
- Michael Clifford – lead guitar, keyboards, backing vocals (all tracks), lead vocals (tracks 2–3, 5–6, 9, 11, 13, 14, 16 18, 20)
- Ashton Irwin – drums, percussion, keyboards, backing vocals (all tracks), lead vocals (tracks 3, 8, 11, 15, 19)

Additional personnel "She Looks So Perfect"

- Eric Valentine – additional production, mastering
- Justin Long – assistant recording engineer

"Don't Stop"

- Chris Lord-Alge – mixing
- Luke Potashnick – additional programming
- Ted Jensen – mastering

"Good Girls"

- John Feldmann – producer, mixing, recording
- Zakk Cervini – engineering, editing, programming, additional production, mixing
- Bunt Stafford-Clark – mastering

"Kiss Me Kiss Me"

- John Feldmann – producer, mixing, recording
- Alex Gaskarth - co-writer
- Chris Qualls – assistant
- Bunt Stafford-Clark – mastering

"18"

- John Feldmann – producer, mixing, recording
- Chris Qualls – assistant
- Bunt Stafford-Clark – mastering

"Everything I Didn't Say"

- John Feldmann – producer, mixing, recording
- Chris Qualls – assistant
- Bunt Stafford-Clark – mastering

"Beside You"

- Joel Chapman – producer
- Louis Schoorl – producer
- John Feldmann – additional production, mixing
- Bunt Stafford-Clark – mastering

"End Up Here"

- John Feldmann – producer, mixing, recording
- Alex Gaskarth - co-writer
- Tommy English – engineering, editing, programming, additional production,
- Chris Qualls – assistant
- Bunt Stafford-Clark – mastering

"Long Way Home"

- John Feldmann – producer, mixing, recording
- Alex Gaskarth - co-writer, additional backing vocals
- Tommy English – engineering, editing, programming, additional production, mixing
- Bunt Stafford-Clark – mastering

"Heartbreak Girl"

- Steve Robson – producer, mixing
- Sam Miller – mixing
- Luke Potashnick – additional programming
- Bunt Stafford-Clark – mastering

"English Love Affair"

- Rick Parkhouse (Red Triangle) – programming, percussion, gang vocals, producer
- Bunt Stafford-Clark – mastering

"Amnesia"

- Sam Watters – producer
- Bunt Stafford-Clark – mastering

"Social Casualty" (Deluxe edition)

- John Feldmann – producer, recording
- Bunt Stafford-Clark – mastering

"Never Be" (Deluxe edition)

- John Feldmann – producer, mixing, recording
- Colin Brittain – engineering, editing, programming, additional production, mixing
- Chris Qualls – Assistant
- Bunt Stafford-Clark – Mastering

"Voodoo Doll" (Deluxe edition)

- John Feldmann – producer, mixing, recording
- Chris Qualls – assistant
- Bunt Stafford-Clark – mastering

"Tomorrow Never Dies" (Target edition)

- Colin Brittain – engineering, editing, programming, additional production, mixing
- Tommy English – engineering, editing, programming, additional production, mixing
- Chris Qualls – assistant
- Bunt Stafford-Clark – mastering

"Independence Day" (Target edition)

- John Feldmann – producer, mixing, recording
- Zakk Cervini – engineering, editing, programming, additional production, mixing
- Nick Furlong – songwriting
- Bunt Stafford-Clark – mastering

"Close as Strangers" (Target edition)

- George Tizzard (Red Triangle) – producer
- Rick Parkhouse (Red Triangle) – producer
- Bunt Stafford-Clark – mastering

"Out of My Limit" (Target edition)

- Bunt Stafford-Clark – mastering

A&R

- Jo Charrington
- Nick Raphael

Photography

- Tom Van Schelven

Art direction and design

- Richard Andrews

== Charts ==
=== Weekly charts ===
Chart (2014-2015)	Peak position
Argentine Albums (CAPIF)	3
Australian Albums (ARIA)	1
Austrian Albums (Ö3 Austria)	4
Belgian Albums (Ultratop Flanders)	1
Belgian Albums (Ultratop Wallonia)	8
Canadian Albums (Billboard)	1
Czech Albums (ČNS IFPI)	1
Danish Albums (Hitlisten)	1
Dutch Albums (Album Top 100)	1
Finnish Albums (Suomen virallinen lista)	4
French Albums (SNEP)	4
German Albums (Offizielle Top 100)	6
Greek Albums (IFPI)	10
Hungarian Albums (MAHASZ)	19
Irish Albums (IRMA)	1
Italian Albums (FIMI)	1
Japanese Albums (Oricon)	19
Mexican Albums (AMPROFON)	3
New Zealand Albums (RMNZ)	1
Norwegian Albums (VG-lista)	1
Polish Albums (ZPAV)	7
Portuguese Albums (AFP)	1
Scottish Albums (Official Charts)	1
South Korean Albums (Gaon)	47
Spanish Albums (Promusicae)	1
Swedish Albums (Sverigetopplistan)	2
Swiss Albums (Schweizer Hitparade)	5
UK Albums (Official Charts)	2
UK Album Downloads (Official Charts)	2
US Billboard 200	1

Chart (2024)	Peak position
Scottish Albums (OCC)	60

=== Monthly charts ===
Monthly chart performance for 5 Seconds of Summer
Chart (2014)	Peak position
Argentine Monthly Albums (CAPIF)	3

=== Year-end charts ===
Chart (2014)	Position
Australian Albums (ARIA)	11
Belgian Albums (Ultratop Flanders)	56
Belgian Albums (Ultratop Wallonia)	178
Canadian Albums (Billboard)	36
Danish Albums (Hitlisten)	48
Dutch Albums (Album Top 100)	59
French Albums (SNEP)	143
Irish Albums (IRMA)	18
Italian Albums (FIMI)	36
Mexican Albums (AMPROFON)	41
New Zealand Albums (RMNZ)	28
Spanish Albums (PROMUSICAE)	43
Swedish Albums (Sverigetopplistan)	51
UK Albums (OCC)	29
US Billboard 200	27

Chart (2015)	Position
US Billboard 200	73

== Certifications ==
Region	Certification	Certified units/sales
Australia (ARIA)	2× Platinum	140,000^{^}
Austria (IFPI Austria)	Gold	7,500^{*}
Brazil (Pro-Música Brasil)	Platinum	40,000^{*}
Canada (Music Canada)	Platinum	80,000^{^}
Denmark (IFPI Danmark)	Platinum	20,000^{‡}
Italy (FIMI)	Gold	25,000^{‡}
Mexico (AMPROFON)	Platinum	60,000^{^}
New Zealand (RMNZ)	Platinum	15,000^{‡}
Poland (ZPAV)	Gold	10,000^{*}
Singapore (RIAS)	Gold	5,000^{*}
Spain (Promusicae)	Gold	20,000^{^}
Sweden (GLF)	Gold	20,000^{‡}
United Kingdom (BPI)	Platinum	300,000^{^}
United States (RIAA)	Platinum	1,000,000^{‡}
^{*} Sales figures based on certification alone.^{^} Shipments figures based on certification alone.^{‡} Sales+streaming figures based on certification alone.

== Release history ==
Country	Date	Format	Edition(s)	Label
Australia	27 June 2014	CD; digital download	Standard; deluxe	Capitol; Hi or Hey
Austria	27 June 2014	CD; digital download	Standard; deluxe	Capitol; Hi or Hey
Czech Republic	27 June 2014	CD; digital download	Standard; deluxe	Capitol; Hi or Hey
Finland	27 June 2014	CD; digital download	Standard; deluxe	Capitol; Hi or Hey
Germany	27 June 2014	CD; digital download	Standard; deluxe	Capitol; Hi or Hey
Ireland	27 June 2014	CD; digital download	Standard; deluxe	Capitol; Hi or Hey
Italy	27 June 2014	CD; digital download	Standard; deluxe	Capitol; Hi or Hey
Netherlands	27 June 2014	CD; digital download	Standard; deluxe	Capitol; Hi or Hey
New Zealand	27 June 2014	CD; digital download	Standard; deluxe	Capitol; Hi or Hey
Slovakia	27 June 2014	CD; digital download	Standard; deluxe	Capitol; Hi or Hey
South Africa	27 June 2014	CD; digital download	Standard; deluxe	Capitol; Hi or Hey
Sweden	27 June 2014	CD; digital download	Standard; deluxe	Capitol; Hi or Hey
Switzerland	27 June 2014	CD; digital download	Standard; deluxe	Capitol; Hi or Hey
Belgium	30 June 2014	CD; digital download	Standard; deluxe	Capitol; Hi or Hey
France	30 June 2014	CD; digital download	Standard; deluxe	Capitol; Hi or Hey
Israel	30 June 2014	CD; digital download	Standard; deluxe	Capitol; Hi or Hey
Malaysia	30 June 2014	CD; digital download	Standard; deluxe	Capitol; Hi or Hey
Peru	30 June 2014	CD; digital download	Standard; deluxe	Capitol; Hi or Hey
Philippines	30 June 2014	CD; digital download	Standard; deluxe	Capitol; Hi or Hey
Poland	30 June 2014	CD; digital download	Standard; deluxe	Capitol; Hi or Hey
Portugal	30 June 2014	CD; digital download	Standard; deluxe	Capitol; Hi or Hey
Spain	30 June 2014	CD; digital download	Standard; deluxe	Capitol; Hi or Hey
United Kingdom	30 June 2014	CD; digital download	Standard; deluxe	Capitol; Hi or Hey
Japan	16 July 2014	CD; digital download	Standard; deluxe	Capitol; Hi or Hey
Canada	22 July 2014	CD; digital download	Standard; deluxe	Capitol; Hi or Hey
Mexico	22 July 2014	CD; digital download	Standard; deluxe	Capitol; Hi or Hey
United States	22 July 2014	CD; digital download	Standard; deluxe	Capitol; Hi or Hey
