= Amnesia (5 Seconds of Summer song) =

Single by 5 Seconds of Summer

from the album 5 Seconds of Summer
- Released: 15 July 2014
- Genre: Pop rock
- Length: 3:57 (album version); 3:41 (radio edit)
- Label: Capitol; Hi or Hey
- Songwriters: Michael Biancaniello; Louis Biancaniello; Benji Madden; Joel Madden; Sam Watters
- Producers: Michael Biancaniello; Louis Biancaniello; Watters

5 Seconds of Summer singles chronology
"Don't Stop" (2014)	"Amnesia" (2014)	"Good Girls" (2014)

Music video
- "Amnesia" on YouTube

"Amnesia" is a song by Australian pop rock band 5 Seconds of Summer, taken from their self-titled debut album 5 Seconds of Summer (2014). The mellow pop rock slow jam was announced as a new single during a live stream by the band on 1 July 2014, and was released to American contemporary hit radio as the third single from the album on 15 July 2014.

== Release ==
An extended play was released in 2014 which contains four tracks: "Amnesia", "Daylight", "American Idiot", and "Amnesia" (live at Wembley).

== Music video ==
A lyric video was produced for the song. Filmed in Los Angeles, it was posted on the official Vevo and YouTube channel of the band on 2 July 2014, at midnight, after their live stream. The video, focuses on a bedroom, though in some scenes, the members of the band appear in a close up. During the whole video, the lyrics are projected in the room or on the members' faces.

A music video directed by Isaac Rentz was also filmed, in which the band members and some girls and boys play around in several different scenes, diving into a pool fully clothed, playing golf on cars, etc. There are also several close-ups of the band-members singing along to the words of the song throughout the video. There are only three girls because they see the watcher and fans as the fourth one. The video was filmed from the fourth girl's perspective.

The video is also the third most viewed by 5 Seconds of Summer. It reached 100 million views on 11 August 2016. As of March 2022, it has 188 million views.

== Covers ==
- During the summer of 2015, the French singer Whities released a French version of the song. "Amnésia (French Version)": which was released in July with an accompanying video available on YouTube and Dailymotion.

== Track listing ==
CD and digital download EP
No.	Title	Writer(s)	Producer(s)	Length
1.	"Amnesia"	Benjamin Madden; Joel Madden; Louis Biancaniello; Michael Biancaniello; Sam Watters	L. Biancaniello; M. Biancaniello; Watters	3:57
2.	"Daylight"	Ashton Irwin; Michael Clifford; Steve Robson; James Bourne; Christopher Bourne	Steve Robson	3:25
3.	"American Idiot"	Billie Joe Armstrong; Frank E. Wright III; Michael R. Pritchard	John Feldmann	3:03
4.	"Amnesia" (Live at Wembley)	B. Madden; J. Madden; L. Biancaniello; M. Biancaniello; Watters	B. Biancaniello; M. Biancaniello; Waters	3:53

7" vinyl

1. "Amnesia" – 3:57
2. "American Idiot" – 3:03

== Personnel ==
- Luke Hemmings – lead vocals
- Michael Clifford – backing vocals, acoustic guitar
- Calum Hood – lead vocals
- Ashton Irwin – backing vocals, drums

== Charts ==
=== Weekly charts ===
Chart (2014)	Peak position
Australia (ARIA)	7
Austria (Ö3 Austria Top 40)	40
Belgium (Ultratop 50 Flanders)	21
Belgium (Ultratop 50 Wallonia)	44
Brazil (Billboard Brasil Hot 100)	86
Canada Hot 100 (Billboard)	19
Czech Republic Singles Digital (ČNS IFPI)	39
Denmark (Tracklisten)	6
France (SNEP)	54
Germany (GfK)	64
Ireland (IRMA)	3
Italy (FIMI)	35
Lebanon (The Official Lebanese Top 20)	5
Mexico Ingles Airplay (Billboard)	2
Netherlands (Single Top 100)	28
New Zealand (Recorded Music NZ)	6
Portugal Digital Song Sales (Billboard)	9
Russia Airplay (Tophit)	188
Scottish Singles Sales (Official Charts)	5
Slovakia Singles Digital (ČNS IFPI)	44
Spain (Promusicae)	3
Sweden (Sverigetopplistan)	60
Switzerland (Schweizer Hitparade)	49
UK Singles (Official Charts)	7
US Billboard Hot 100	16
US Adult Pop Airplay (Billboard)	40
US Pop Airplay (Billboard)	16

=== Year-end charts ===
Chart (2014)	Position
Australia (ARIA)	51
US Billboard Hot 100	86

== Certifications ==
Region	Certification	Certified units/sales
Australia (ARIA)	5× Platinum	350,000^{‡}
Canada (Music Canada)	Gold	40,000^{*}
Denmark (IFPI Danmark)	Gold	45,000^{‡}
New Zealand (RMNZ)	Platinum	30,000^{‡}
Norway (IFPI Norway)	Gold	5,000^{‡}
Sweden (GLF)	Gold	20,000^{‡}
United Kingdom (BPI)	Platinum	600,000^{‡}
United States (RIAA)	2× Platinum	729,000
^{*} Sales figures based on certification alone.^{‡} Sales+streaming figures based on certification alone.

== Release history ==
Region	Date	Format	Record label
United States	15 July 2014	Contemporary hit radio	Capitol; Hi or Hey
Worldwide	5 September 2014	7"; CD; digital download	Capitol; Hi or Hey
