= Don't Stop (5 Seconds of Summer song) =

Single by 5 Seconds of Summer

from the album 5 Seconds of Summer
- Released: 9 May 2014
- Recorded: 2013
- Genre: Pop-punk; power pop
- Length: 2:52
- Label: Capitol; Hi or Hey
- Songwriters: Steve Robson; busbee; Luke Hemmings; Calum Hood
- Producer: Steve Robson

5 Seconds of Summer singles chronology
| "She Looks So Perfect" (2014) | "Don't Stop" (2014) | "Amnesia" (2014) |

Music video
- "Don't Stop" on YouTube

"Don't Stop" is a song by Australian pop rock band 5 Seconds of Summer, taken from their debut album, 5 Seconds of Summer (2014). The song was released on 9 May 2014 through Capitol Records and Hi or Hey Records as the album's second single.

== Critical reception ==
Amy Davidson of Digital Spy gave the song 4/5 stars, stating "Blink-182 may have released their first song long before any of the Aussie four-piece were even born, but that hasn't deterred 5SOS from being the band's loyal understudies. 'Don't Stop' sees them jolting new life into an otherwise flagging pop punk genre, charging ahead as leaders of the revival." It is also described as a power pop track.

== Release ==
An extended play was released in June 2014. The version for streaming contains five tracks: "Don't Stop", "Rejects", "Try Hard", "Wrapped Around Your Finger", and "If You Don't Know".

== Chart performance ==
The song debuted at number two on the UK Singles Chart, selling 80,022 copies, 3,000 copies behind Ella Henderson's "Ghost".

== Music video ==
A lyric video for the single was released on 5 May 2014 through the band's Vevo channel. The official music video was released two weeks later on 19 May 2014 at a total length of three minutes and 38 seconds. It features each band member dressed as a superhero, trying to save and do good deeds to people. Calum Hood is Cal-Pal, Ashton Irwin is SmAsh!, Michael Clifford is Mike-Ro-Wave, and Luke Hemmings is Dr. Fluke. As of November 2022, it has over 90 million views.

== Track listings ==
CD single
| No. | Title | Writer(s) | Producer(s) | Length |
|---|---|---|---|---|
| 1. | "Don't Stop" | Calum Hood; Luke Hemmings | Robson | 2:51 |
| 2. | "Rejects" | Ashton Irwin; Hood; Hemmings; Michael Clifford | | 2:49 |
| 3. | "Try Hard" | Hood; Hemmings; Richard Stannard; Seton Daunt; Ash Howes; Tom Fletcher | Feldmann | 3:41 |
| 4. | "If You Don't Know" | Hood; Hemmings; Robson; Benjamin Madden; Joel Madden | Robson; Luke Potashnick^{[a]}; Eddy Thrower^{[a]} | 3:28 |

CD single 2
| No. | Title | Writer(s) | Producer(s) | Length |
|---|---|---|---|---|
| 1. | "Don't Stop" (Calum Demo Vocal) | Hood; Hemmings; Robson; busbee | Robson | 2:49 |
| 2. | "Wrapped Around Your Finger" | Hemmings; Clifford; Feldmann | Feldmann | 3:40 |

Digital download
| No. | Title | Length |
|---|---|---|
| 1. | "Don't Stop" | 2:50 |

Digital download – Calum demo vocal
| No. | Title | Length |
|---|---|---|
| 1. | "Don't Stop" (Calum Demo Vocal) | 2:49 |

Digital download – acoustic
| No. | Title | Length |
|---|---|---|
| 1. | "Don't Stop" (Acoustic) | 2:50 |

Digital download – Don't Stop (B-Sides)
| No. | Title | Length |
|---|---|---|
| 1. | "Rejects" | 2:49 |
| 2. | "Try Hard" | 3:41 |
| 3. | "Don't Stop" (Calum Demo Vocal) | 2:49 |
| 4. | "Don't Stop" (Ash Demo Vocal) | 2:49 |
| 5. | "Don't Stop" (Acoustic) | 2:37 |
| 6. | "If You Don't Know" | 3:27 |
| 7. | "Wrapped Around Your Finger" | 3:40 |

Digital EP
| No. | Title | Length |
|---|---|---|
| 1. | "Don't Stop" (Ashton Demo Vocal) | 2:50 |
| 2. | "Rejects" | 2:49 |
| 3. | "Try Hard" | 3:41 |
| 4. | "Wrapped Around Your Finger" | 3:40 |

Japanese CD single
| No. | Title | Length |
|---|---|---|
| 1. | "Don't Stop" | 2:51 |
| 2. | "Rejects" | 2:49 |
| 3. | "Try Hard" | 3:41 |
| 4. | "If You Don't Know" | 3:28 |
| 5. | "She Looks So Perfect" | 3:24 |

Notes

- ^{^[a]} signifies an additional producer

== Personnel ==
- Luke Hemmings – rhythm guitar, lead vocals
- Michael Clifford – lead guitar, lead vocals
- Calum Hood – bass guitar, lead vocals
- Ashton Irwin – drums, vocals

"Don't Stop"

- Chris Lord-Alge – mixing
- Luke Potashnick – additional programming
- Eddy Thrower – additional programming
- Josh Wilkinson – additional programming
- Keith Armstrong – assistant mixing
- Nik Karpen – assistant mixing
- Andrew Schubert – additional engineering
- Dmitar "Dim-E" Krnjaic – additional engineering
- Ted Jensen – mastering

"Rejects"

- John Feldmann – mixing, recording, producer
- Zakk Cervini – engineering, programming
- Colin Cunningham – engineering, programming
- Bunt Stafford-Clark – mastering

"Try Hard"

- John Feldmann – mixing, recording, producer
- Zakk Cervini – engineering, programming
- Colin Cunningham – engineering, programming
- Bunt Stafford-Clark – mastering

"If You Don't Know"

- Steve Robinson – mixing, recording, producer
- Luke Potashnick – additional production
- Eddy Thrower – additional production
- Bunt Stafford-Clark – mastering

"Wrapped Around Your Finger"

- John Feldmann – mixing, recording, producer
- Zakk Cervini – engineering, programming
- Colin Cunningham – engineering, programming
- Bunt Stafford-Clark – mastering

Photography

- Tom van Schelven

Art direction and design

- Richard Andrews

Credits adapted from CD single inserts.

== Charts ==
=== Weekly charts ===
Weekly chart performance for "Don't Stop"
| Chart (2014) | Peak position |
|---|---|
| Australia (ARIA) | 3 |
| Austria (Ö3 Austria Top 40) | 37 |
| Belgium (Ultratop 50 Flanders) | 16 |
| Belgium (Ultratop 50 Wallonia) | 39 |
| Canada Hot 100 (Billboard) | 34 |
| Denmark (Tracklisten) | 18 |
| France (SNEP) | 63 |
| Germany (GfK) | 46 |
| Ireland (IRMA) | 1 |
| Japan Hot 100 (Billboard) | 11 |
| Mexico Ingles Airplay (Billboard) | 28 |
| Netherlands (Single Top 100) | 25 |
| New Zealand (Recorded Music NZ) | 1 |
| Scottish Singles Sales (Official Charts) | 1 |
| South Korea International (Gaon) | 61 |
| Spain (Promusicae) | 3 |
| Sweden Digital Song Sales (Billboard) | 1 |
| Switzerland (Schweizer Hitparade) | 36 |
| UK Singles (Official Charts) | 2 |
| US Billboard Hot 100 | 47 |

=== Year-end charts ===
Year-end chart performance for "Don't Stop"
| Chart (2014) | Position |
|---|---|
| Australian Artist Singles (ARIA) | 22 |
| Japan (Japan Hot Overseas) | 20 |
| Japan Adult Contemporary (Billboard) | 83 |
| Taiwan (Hito Radio) | 22 |
| UK Singles (OCC) | 85 |

== Certifications ==
| Region | Certification | Certified units/sales |
|---|---|---|
| Australia (ARIA) | 2× Platinum | 140,000^{‡} |
| New Zealand (RMNZ) | Gold | 7,500^{*} |
| Sweden (GLF) | Gold | 20,000^{‡} |
| United Kingdom (BPI) | Platinum | 600,000^{‡} |
| United States (RIAA) | Gold | 500,000^{‡} |
^{*} Sales figures based on certification alone.^{‡} Sales+streaming figures based on certification alone.

== Release history ==
| Country | Date | Format | Label |
|---|---|---|---|
| Australia | 9 May 2014 | CD; digital download | Capitol; Hi or Hey |
| Europe | 13 June 2014 | CD; digital download | Capitol; Hi or Hey |
