= She Looks So Perfect =

2014 single by 5 Seconds of Summer

Single by 5 Seconds of Summer

from the album 5 Seconds of Summer
- Released: 21 February 2014
- Recorded: 2013
- Genre: Pop-punk; power pop; pop rock
- Length: 3:22
- Label: Capitol; Hi or Hey
- Songwriters: Ashton Irwin; Michael Clifford; Jake Sinclair
- Producers: Jake Sinclair; Eric Valentine

5 Seconds of Summer singles chronology
"Out of My Limit" (2012)	"She Looks So Perfect" (2014)	"Don't Stop" (2014)

Music video
- "She Looks So Perfect" on YouTube

"She Looks So Perfect" is a song and extended play by Australian pop rock band 5 Seconds of Summer, taken from their self-titled debut album (2014). The song was digitally released in Australia on 23 February 2014 and in Europe on 23 March 2014 through Capitol Records and Hi or Hey Records, as their debut single with a major record label. The accompanying music video was released on 24 February 2014. The song peaked at number one in Australia, New Zealand, Ireland and the United Kingdom. It was certified 9× platinum by the Australian Recording Industry Association. The song also won "Song of the Year" at the ARIA Music Awards in 2014. Ed Sheeran covered the song on Capital FM.

== Background ==
"She Looks So Perfect" has been described as pop punk, power pop and pop rock. It was written by band members Michael Clifford and Ashton Irwin along with Jake Sinclair, who also produced the song, with additional production by Eric Valentine. The single is the leading track on the band's She Looks So Perfect EP, and is the first track on the band's self-titled debut studio album.

== Critical reception ==
Professional ratings
Review scores
Source	Rating
AllMusic	3.5/5 stars
Digital Spy	3/5 stars

Lewis Corner of Digital Spy gave the song a mixed review, stating that:

"While their influences clearly nod towards pop-punk godfathers Green Day and Blink-182, 5SOS's official debut 'She Looks So Perfect' is strewn with teen heartthrob clichés. "We worked too damn hard for this just to give it up now," Luke tells his flame over a plucky electric guitar, before the song bursts into a lofty chorus and further promises of diamond rings and plane tickets. It's the age-old tale of a forbidden romantic runaway; trouble is, with this anthem poised to scale the chart, slipping away unnoticed will soon prove slightly more difficult.

The Wire wrote that the song sounds as if it were purposely crafted as power pop to appeal to fans of a boy band, but an "infinitesimally edgier" boy band than One Direction. Billboard called the song "school rock" and described it as a "slick crowd pleaser" performed live for the 2014 Billboard Music Awards show. Rachael McArthur of Renowned for Sound gave a mixed review stating, "The vocals are very polished and boy-bandy and delivered with great enthusiasm." However, McArthur was critical of the lyrics more specifically the line, "I'm so down" during the chorus calling it, "a little annoying." In 2018, the song was ranked twentieth by Billboard in their compilation of the 100 Greatest Boyband Songs of All Time.

== Record releases ==
An extended play was released on 21 March 2014, containing five tracks: "She Looks So Perfect", "Heartache on the Big Screen", "The Only Reason", "What I Like About You", and "Disconnected".

== Chart performance ==
On 1 March 2014, "She Looks So Perfect" debuted at number three on the Australian ARIA Singles Chart, being kept off the top spot by Clean Bandit's "Rather Be" and Pharrell Williams' "Happy". The song finally reached number one on its fifth week on the chart, as well as being certified Platinum for sales of 70,000 copies. Likewise, it debuted at number four on the New Zealand Singles Chart and in its fifth week, the song jumped from number nine to number one. The week after, it was certified Gold.

"She Looks So Perfect" debuted at number one on the Irish Singles Chart on 27 March 2014. On 30 March, it debuted at number one on the UK Singles Chart with about 94,000 copies sold in first week. It was the fourth UK number one single by a band from Australia and the first since Madison Avenue's "Don't Call Me Baby", topped the chart in May 2000. In its second week, "She Look So Perfect" dropped to tenth place, which is the biggest drop from the top spot since McFly's double single "Baby's Come Back"/"Transylvania", who tie this record with Elvis Presley's re-release "One Night"/"I Got Stung" from 2005 and dropped from number one to number 20 in April 2007.

"She Looks So Perfect" entered on the US Billboard Hot 100 on 12 April 2014. On 24 May 2014, six weeks after their debut, "She Looks So Perfect" reached number 37. A week later, the track reached its peak position at number 32, becoming the band's first top 40 single. As of December 2014, the single has sold 925,000 copies in the US.

The EP debuted at number two on the US Billboard 200 and number one on the Canadian Albums Chart.

== Music video ==
The official music video was directed by Frank Borin. It was released to YouTube on 24 February 2014. It features the band singing in an alley, while men and women start dancing and removing clothing at stores, classrooms, a prison and a diner. As of November 2026, the video has accumulated over 331 million views on YouTube.

== Awards and nominations ==
Awards and nominations for "She Looks So Perfect"
Year	Organization	Award	Result	Ref(s)
2014	World Music Awards	World's Best Song	Nominated	
2014	World Music Awards	World's Best Video	Nominated	
2014	iHeartRadio MMVAs	International Video of the Year – Group	Nominated	
2014	Teen Choice Awards	Choice Music Single – Group	Nominated	
2014	MTV Video Music Awards	Artist to Watch	Nominated	
2014	ARIA Music Awards	Song of the Year	Won	
2014	Rockbjörnen	Best Foreign Song	Nominated	
2015	APRA Awards	Most Played Australian Work	Nominated	
2015	APRA Awards	Pop Work of the Year	Nominated	

== Track listing ==
CD single – part one
No.	Title	Writer(s)	Producer(s)	Length
1.	"She Looks So Perfect"	Ashton Irwin; Michael Clifford; Jake Sinclair	Sinclair; Eric Valentine^{[a]}	3:22
2.	"Heartache On the Big Screen"	Irwin; Clifford; Luke Hemmings; Calum Hood; Dan Lancaster; Mike Duce	Lancaster; Duce^{[b]}	3:24
3.	"The Only Reason"	Clifford; Steve Robson; busbee	Robson	3:22
4.	"Disconnected"	Hemmings; Hood; John Feldmann; Alex Gaskarth	Feldmann	3:31

CD single – part two
No.	Title	Writer(s)	Producer(s)	Length
1.	"She Looks So Perfect" (Ash Demo Vocal)	Irwin; Clifford; Sinclair	Sinclair	3:23
2.	"She Looks So Perfect" (Mikey Demo Vocal)	Irwin; Clifford; Sinclair	Sinclair	3:24
3.	"What I Like About You"	Walter Palamarchuk; Michael Skill; James Marinos	Feldmann	2:33

Digital download
No.	Title	Length
1.	"She Looks So Perfect"	3:22

Digital download – Ash demo vocal
No.	Title	Length
1.	"She Looks So Perfect" (Ash Demo Vocal)	3:23

Digital download – acoustic version
No.	Title	Length
1.	"She Looks So Perfect" (acoustic version)	3:22

Digital EP
No.	Title	Length
1.	"She Looks So Perfect" (Mikey Demo Vocal)	3:24
2.	"Heartache On the Big Screen"	3:24
3.	"The Only Reason"	3:22
4.	"What I Like About You"	2:33

Cassette
No.	Title	Length
1.	"She Looks So Perfect" (Acoustic)	3:22
2.	"Wherever You Are"	3:25
3.	"What I Like About You"	2:25

Notes

- ^{^[a]} signifies an additional producer
- ^{^[b]} signifies a vocal producer

== Personnel ==
- Luke Hemmings – rhythm guitar, lead vocals
- Michael Clifford – lead guitar, backing vocals
- Calum Hood – bass guitar, lead vocals
- Ashton Irwin – drums, backing vocals

"She Looks So Perfect"

- Jake Sinclair – producer, engineer, background vocals, guitar, programming
- Eric Valentine – additional production, mixing, mastering
- Cian Riordan – engineer
- Justin Long – assistant recording engineer

"Heartache on the Big Screen"

- Dan Lancaster – producer, vocal production, recording
- Mike Duce – vocal production
- Peter Miles – recording
- Bunt Stafford-Clark – mastering

"The Only Reason"

- Steve Robson – producer, mixing
- Sam Miller – mixing
- Bunt Stafford-Clark – mastering

"Disconnected"

- John Feldmann – producer, mixing, recording
- Zakk Cervini – additional engineering, programming
- Ago Teppand – additional engineering, programming
- Colin Cunningham – additional engineering, programming
- Bunt Stafford-Clark – mastering

"What I Like About You"

- John Feldmann – producer, mixing, recording
- Zakk Cervini – additional engineering, programming
- Ago Teppand – additional engineering, programming
- Colin Cunningham – additional engineering, programming
- Bunt Stafford-Clark – mastering

Photography

- Tom van Schelven

Art direction and design

- Richard Andrews

Credits adapted from CD single inserts.

== Charts ==
=== Weekly charts ===
Weekly chart performance "She Looks So Perfect"
Chart (2014)	Peak position
Australia (ARIA)	1
Austria (Ö3 Austria Top 40)	21
Belgium (Ultratop 50 Flanders)	20
Belgium (Ultratop 50 Wallonia)	33
Canada Hot 100 (Billboard)	25
CIS Airplay (TopHit)	106
Czech Republic Airplay (ČNS IFPI)	98
Czech Republic Singles Digital (ČNS IFPI)	43
Denmark (Tracklisten)	12
France (SNEP)	40
Germany (GfK)	35
Greece Digital Songs (Billboard)	9
Ireland (IRMA)	1
Lebanon (The Official Lebanese Top 20)	4
Mexico (Billboard Mexican Airplay)	8
Mexico Anglo (Monitor Latino)	5
Netherlands (Single Top 100)	13
New Zealand (Recorded Music NZ)	1
Russia Airplay (Tophit)	110
Scottish Singles Sales (Official Charts)	1
Slovakia Airplay (ČNS IFPI)	84
Slovakia Singles Digital (ČNS IFPI)	30
Spain (Promusicae)	5
Sweden (Sverigetopplistan)	46
Switzerland (Schweizer Hitparade)	26
UK Singles (Official Charts)	1
US Billboard Hot 100	24
US Pop Airplay (Billboard)	19

=== Year-end charts ===
Year-end chart performance for "She Looks So Perfect"
Chart (2014)	Position
Australia (ARIA)	20
Ireland (IRMA)	20
New Zealand (Recorded Music NZ)	36
UK Singles (Official Charts Company)	50
US Billboard Hot 100	93

=== Weekly charts ===
Weekly chart performance for She Looks So Perfect EP
Chart (2014)	Peak position
Canadian Albums (Billboard)	1
Mexican Albums (Top 100 Mexico)	11
US Billboard 200	2

=== Year-end charts ===
Year-end chart performance for She Looks So Perfect EP
Chart (2014)	Position
Mexican Albums (AMPROFON)	87
US Billboard 200	53

== Certifications ==
Region	Certification	Certified units/sales
Australia (ARIA)	9× Platinum	630,000^{‡}
Brazil (Pro-Música Brasil)	Platinum	60,000^{‡}
Canada (Music Canada)	Platinum	80,000^{*}
Denmark (IFPI Danmark)	Platinum	90,000^{‡}
Italy (FIMI)	Gold	15,000^{‡}
New Zealand (RMNZ)	3× Platinum	90,000^{‡}
Norway (IFPI Norway)	Gold	5,000^{‡}
Spain (Promusicae)	Gold	30,000^{‡}
Sweden (GLF)	Platinum	40,000^{‡}
United Kingdom (BPI)	2× Platinum	1,200,000^{‡}
United States (RIAA)	2× Platinum	2,000,000^{‡}
Streaming
Denmark (IFPI Danmark)	Gold	1,300,000^{†}
^{*} Sales figures based on certification alone.^{‡} Sales+streaming figures based on certification alone.^{†} Streaming-only figures based on certification alone.

== Release history ==
Country	Date	Format	Label
Australia	21 February 2014	CD; digital download	Capitol; Hi or Hey
New Zealand	21 February 2014	CD; digital download	Capitol; Hi or Hey
United Kingdom	23 March 2014	CD; digital download	Capitol; Hi or Hey
United States	2 April 2014	CD; digital download	Capitol; Hi or Hey

=== Extended play ===
Country	Date	Format	Label
Australia	21 March 2014	Digital download	Capitol Records
New Zealand	21 March 2014	Digital download	Capitol Records
United Kingdom	21 March 2014	Digital download	Capitol Records
United States	1 April 2014	Digital download	Capitol Records

== See also ==
- List of number-one singles of 2014 (Australia)
- List of artists who have had number-one singles on the UK Official Download Chart
