= The Feeling of Falling Upwards =

The Feeling of Falling Upwards (Live from the Royal Albert Hall)

Live album by 5 Seconds of Summer
- Released: 14 April 2023
- Recorded: 22 September 2022
- Venue: Royal Albert Hall, London
- Label: 5SOS LLC, BMG

5 Seconds of Summer chronology
5SOS5 (2022)	The Feeling of Falling Upwards (Live from the Royal Albert Hall) (2023)	Everyone's a Star! (2025)

The Feeling of Falling Upwards (Live from the Royal Albert Hall) is the third live album by Australian pop-rock band 5 Seconds of Summer. The album was released digitally on 14 April 2023 by 5SOS LLC and BMG, and consists of 17 tracks recorded at Royal Albert Hall, London in September 2022.

== Background ==
The album was recorded alongside a 12-piece string orchestra and a 12-member gospel choir during a special one-night-only concert 22 September 2022. The performance was live-streamed a day before the release of the band's fifth studio album, 5SOS5.

During the performance, vocalist and drummer Ashton Irwin said "The Feeling of Falling Upwards is simply supposed to describe to you the feeling that we have experienced together, the feeling of taking a leap of faith on such a fickle thing like music and sharing this experience together year after year, season after season of our lives. "

The album was released digitally on 14 April 2023 and scheduled for physical release on 14 July 2023.

== Critical reception ==
Professional ratings
Review scores
Source	Rating
Clash	8/10

Amrit Virdi from Clash wrote: "Framed as a musical journey across their 12-year discography, the excellent production and instrumentation truly makes you feel as if you were on the ride with them and emphasises how it is completely different to anything they’ve done before". Adding, "What makes this so unique compared to the band's other live albums is the impeccable addition of the House Gospel Choir and 12-piece string ensemble." Virdi concluded their review saying, "5 Seconds Of Summer can firmly say that they've come far on their musical journey and are far from the poppy live shows they'd put on in 2014, growing to be a talented four-piece. If more orchestral live shows are to be put on by the band, I'll be there in the front row."

== Track listing ==
1. "Overture" – 1:12
2. "Complete Mess" – 3:51
3. "Carousel" – 4:02
4. "Me, Myself and I" – 4:37
5. "She Looks So Perfect" – 3:13
6. "Amnesia" – 4:15
7. "Lie to Me" – 2:45
8. "Caramel" – 3:07
9. "Outer Space" / "Carry On" – 7:05
10. "Youngblood" – 3:55
11. "Red Desert" – 2:28
12. "Jet Black Heart" – 4:49
13. "Older" (featuring Sierra Deaton) – 3:41
14. "Take My Hand" – 5:11
15. "Teeth" – 3:39
16. "Ghost of You" – 6:38
17. "Bad Omens" – 4:50

== Charts ==
Chart performance for The Feeling of Falling Upwards
Chart (2023)	Peak position
Australian Albums (ARIA)	34
Polish Albums (ZPAV)	49
Scottish Albums (OCC)	11
UK Independent Albums (OCC)	8
US Top Current Albums Sales (Billboard)	25

== Release history ==
Release history and formats for The Feeling of Falling Upwards
Country	Date	Format	Edition(s)	Label	Reference
Various	14 April 2023	Streaming; digital download	BMG	—N/a	
Australia	14 July 2023	CD	BMG	538901222	
Australia	14 July 2023	2×LP	BMG	538901231	
