= Bad Omens (song) =

Promotional single by 5 Seconds of Summer

from the album 5SOS5
- Released: 23 September 2022
- Genre: Pop
- Length: 3:35
- Label: BMG
- Songwriters: Ashton Irwin; Luke Hemmings; James Abrahart; Sarah Hudson; Jason Evigan
- Producer: Evigan

"Bad Omens" is a song by Australian pop rock band 5 Seconds of Summer. It was released on 23 September 2022, as a promotional single from their fifth studio album, 5SOS5. A music video was released in promotion of the song on 26 September.

== Composition and lyrics ==
"Bad Omens" was written by Ashton Irwin, Luke Hemmings, James Abrahart, Sarah Hudson and Jason Evigan, while production was handled by Evigan. According to the sheet music published at Musicnotes.com, by Alfred Music Publishing, the track runs at 134 BPM and is in the key of D flat major. Hemmings' range in the song spans from the notes Db4 to Db6. The track was recorded towards the end of the album progress, according to the band. Rather than layering the gang vocals at the end of the song harmony by harmony, they recorded it together all in the same room.

In an interview with Spotify, the group stated it was one of their favourites from the album and is about "how some people tend to ignore bad omens, or in other words, the red flags in their partners just because they love them. They tend to have trouble letting go of them for that same reason."

== Release ==
On 22 September 2022, the group performed the track live at Royal Albert Hall in London, England, as part of their The Feeling of Falling Upwards event. The following day, the song was released for digital download along with the album.

== Critical reception ==
Lauren Cox of The Indiependent stated, "their lyrical content has stayed much the same, revolving around themes of heartbreak and toxic relationships – and 'Bad Omens' is no exception." She praised Hemmings' vocals and described the bridge as the song's highlight remarking, "the band's vocals are layered to create a beautiful chant... The lyrics are complemented by a rhythmic drum beat, building up to a very satisfyingly cinematic outro."

== Music video ==
The music video for "Bad Omens" premiered on 26 September 2022, and was directed by Alyona Shchasnaia and Danny Mitri. Shot in Ukraine, the video finds the leading couple haunted by giant red flags. The pair wake up in a totaled vehicle and outside, large fabric floats through the air. When one completely overtakes the car, the video flashes back to the origin of how they ended up in the middle of a ditch in the first place. Eventually, the red flags consume them and soon enough, the backseat is empty and a moment later the fabric becomes a cape for the vehicle as it drives directly over the edge of a cliff.

== Personnel ==
Credits for "Bad Omens" adapted from album's liner notes.

5 Seconds of Summer

- Luke Hemmings – lead vocals, rhythm guitar, keyboards
- Calum Hood – bass guitar, backing vocals, keyboards
- Michael Clifford – lead guitar, backing vocals, keyboards
- Ashton Irwin – drums, backing vocals, keyboards

Additional musicians

- James Abrahart – backing vocals
- Jason Evigan – guitar, synthesizer
- Mark Schick – guitar

Production

- Jason Evigan – producer, drum programmer, vocal producer
- Lionel Crasta – engineer, vocal producer
- Rafael Fadul – engineer
- Chris Gehringer – engineer
- Cameron Hogan – engineer
- Jackson Rau – engineer
- Spike Stent – engineer
- Matt Wolach – assistant mixer

== Charts ==
Chart performance for "Bad Omens"
Chart (2022)	Peak position
New Zealand Hot Singles (RMNZ)	9
