= 2011 (song) =

Single by 5 Seconds of Summer
- Released: 3 December 2021
- Genre: Pop punk
- Length: 3:17
- Label: BMG
- Songwriters: Michael Clifford; Calum Hood; Nick Long
- Producers: Clifford; John Feldmann

5 Seconds of Summer singles chronology
"Wildflower" (2020)	"2011" (2021)	"Complete Mess" (2022)

Music video
- "2011" on YouTube

"2011" is a song by the Australian pop rock band, 5 Seconds of Summer. It was released on 3 December 2021 independently in partnership with BMG. The song celebrates their 10-year anniversary as a group.

== Background ==
"2011" was written by Michael Clifford, Calum Hood and Nick Long while production was handled by John Feldmann and co-produced by Clifford. The group released the single in celebration of their 10-year anniversary as a band. They stated that the song is "a homage to the past, and a nod to what we have in store for the future."

== Reception ==
"2011" was met with positive reviews from music critics. Anissa Sanchez of Euphoria Magazine stated that the song, "opens straight away with wistful lyrics that center on the theme of reminiscence." She also added, "the track fuses together the band’s early punk-rock roots with their more recent pop sound."

== Music video ==
A live music video performance for "2011" was released in December 2021. Upon the live performance, the band stated that they wanted to create "something that captures the pursuit of creation, the love of the relationship we have with our fans and the endless boundary of what it means to be in a band."

== Personnel ==
Credits for "2011" adapted from AllMusic.

Musicians

- Michael Clifford – lead vocals, lead guitar, composer, instrumentation, producer, programming
- Calum Hood – lead vocals, bass, composer
- Luke Hemmings – rhythm guitar, backing vocals
- Ashton Irwin – backing vocals, drums

Production

- Neal Avron – engineering
- John Feldmann – instrumentation, producer, programming
- Chris Gehringer – engineering
- Nick Long – composer
- Dylan McLean – engineering, producer
- Scott Skrzynski – mixing assistant
- Scot Stewart – engineering, producer

== Charts ==
Chart performance for "2011"
Chart (2021)	Peak position
Australia Independent Singles (AIR)	4
New Zealand Hot Singles (RMNZ)	12
