= Blender (song) =

Single by 5 Seconds of Summer

from the album 5SOS5
- Released: 13 July 2022
- Genre: Pop; pop rock
- Length: 2:27
- Label: BMG
- Songwriters: Luke Hemmings; Calum Hood; Ashton Irwin; Jacob Torrey; Peter Thomas
- Producer: Thomas

5 Seconds of Summer singles chronology
"Me Myself & I" (2022)	"Blender" (2022)	"Older" (2022)

Music video
- "Blender" on YouTube

"Blender" is a song by Australian pop rock band 5 Seconds of Summer. It was released on 13 July 2022 as the fourth single from their fifth studio album 5SOS5.

== Background and composition ==
"Blender" was written by members of the band, Jacob Torrey and Peter Thomas while production was also handled by Thomas. The track runs at 162 BPM and is in the key of G-sharp major. Hemmings' range in the song spans from the notes Bb2 to Eb5. The song contains the theme of "emotional damage" and has been described as an anthemic pop rock track.

Along with the songs arrival, the group also released a retro arcade game titled, "BLENDER BRUTALITY" which is a pac-man style game where fans grab all the items and escape the blenders. Additionally, the band created a page on their official website entitled, "Emotional Blender" where fans can anonymously submit messages about how they were feeling.

== Critical reception ==
"Blender" was met with generally positive reviews by music critics. Grace Powers of Music Daily called the track a "quick pace" song with a catchy chorus. She also stated, "Its blunt and honest songwriting mixed with punchy drums and guitar makes me even more excited to see what's in store on 5SOS5. Stephen Ackroyd of Readdork called the "Blender" a "bubbly pop bop."

== Music video ==
A music video for "Blender" premiered on 27 July 2022 and was directed by Ryan Fleming.

== Personnel ==
Credits for "Blender" adapted from AllMusic.

Musicians

- Luke Hemmings – composer, guitar, keyboards, vocals
- Michael Clifford – guitar, keyboards, backing vocals
- Calum Hood – bass, composer, keyboards, vocals
- Ashton Irwin – backing vocals, composer, drums, keyboards

Additional musicians

- Jacob Scesney – saxophone
- Peter Thomas – backing vocals, composer, drum programming, engineering, keyboards, producer

Production

- Chris Gehringer – engineering
- Matt Pauling – engineering
- Spike Stent – engineering
- Jake Torrey – composer, producer
- Matt Wolach – mixing assistant

== Charts ==
Chart performance for "Blender"
Chart (2022)	Peak position
New Zealand Hot Singles (RMNZ)	23
