= Wormstein =

Music band

Wormstein was a 5-man band who released their only single on 23 April 2015. It was believed that the members consisted of those from Australian band 5 Seconds of Summer and John Feldman. This was not confirmed until an article was released where Luke Hemmings confirmed that Wormstein consisted of the 5SOS members.
