= Me Myself & I (5 Seconds of Summer song) =

Single by 5 Seconds of Summer

from the album 5SOS5
- Released: 11 May 2022
- Recorded: 2020
- Genre: Pop punk
- Length: 2:57
- Label: BMG
- Songwriters: Michael Clifford; Luke Hemmings; Calum Hood; Ashton Irwin; Jon Bellion; Jason Evigan; Pete Nappi
- Producers: Bellion; Evigan; Nappi

5 Seconds of Summer singles chronology
"Take My Hand" (2022)	"Me Myself & I" (2022)	"Blender" (2022)

Music video
- "Me Myself & I" on YouTube

"Me Myself & I" is a song by Australian pop rock band 5 Seconds of Summer. It was released on 11 May 2022 as the third single from their fifth studio album 5SOS5.

== Background ==
"Me Myself and I" was written by members of the band, Jon Bellion, Jason Evigan and Pete Nappi. It was produced by Bellion, Evigan and Nappi. Speaking to Rolling Stone Australia about the song, lead singer Luke Hemmings said;

"'Me, Myself, and I' is a really exciting song for us to have on the record that we've spent the last two years making. We're all big fans of Jon Bellion and when he sent us the idea, we instantly connected with it. So much of what we had been writing lyrically was extremely introspective and this song fit like a puzzle piece with the rest of the album."

According to Hemmings, the song is about "the emotional cycle of feeling like you can do everything on your own and that you don't need anyone else, but eventually realizing that sometimes you push away the best things in your life." The group performed the song live at Good Morning America.

== Reception ==
The song has been described as a "propulsive break-up anthem". NME called it "an airy, atmospheric soundscape filled with jaunty strummed guitars, ultra-crisp percussion and layered lead vocals primed for singalongs."

== Music video ==
The music video for "Me Myself & I" was released on 13 May 2022 and was directed by Harry Law. The video draws inspiration from "classic pop rock 90's/early 00's music videos such as Oasis, Red Hot Chili Peppers and The All-American Rejects". The video showcases the band performing in a dimly lit warehouse and camera cuts around the different personalities of each band member to reflect stripping back of layers as they confront their reflective consciousness.

== Personnel ==
Credits for "Me Myself & I" adapted from AllMusic.

Musicians

- Luke Hemmings – lead vocals, rhythm guitar, composer, keyboards
- Michael Clifford – lead guitar, keyboards, backing vocals, composer, vocal producer
- Calum Hood – bass, composer, keyboards, backing vocals
- Ashton Irwin – backing vocals, composer, drums, keyboards

Production

- Jon Bellion – composer, producer
- Bryce Bordone – mixing assistant
- Mick Coogan – composer
- Lionel Crasta – engineering, vocal producer
- Jason Evigan – composer, drum programming, producer, synthesizer
- Rafael Fadul – engineering
- Chris Gehringer – engineering
- Serban Ghenea – engineering
- Cameron Hogan – engineering
- Chris Kaysch – engineering
- Pete Nappi – composer, producer
- Matt Pauling – engineering
- Jackson Rau – engineering

== Charts ==
=== Weekly charts ===
Weekly chart performance for "Me Myself & I"
Chart (2022)	Peak position
Australia (ARIA)	90
Belgium (Ultratop 50 Flanders)	29
Mexico Ingles Airplay (Billboard)	27
Netherlands (Dutch Top 40 Tiparade)	7
New Zealand Hot Singles (RMNZ)	13
US Adult Pop Airplay (Billboard)	22
US Pop Airplay (Billboard)	36

=== Year-end charts ===
Year-end chart performance for "Me Myself & I"
Chart (2022)	Position
Belgium (Ultratop 50 Flanders)	139

== Release history ==
Release history for "Me Myself & I"
Region	Date	Format	Label	Ref.
Various	11 May 2022	Digital download; streaming	BMG	
Italy	11 May 2022	Contemporary hit radio	BMG	
