= Older (5 Seconds of Summer song) =

2022 song by 5 Seconds of Summer featuring Sierra Deaton

Single by 5 Seconds of Summer featuring Sierra Deaton

from the album 5SOS5
- Released: 7 September 2022
- Genre: Pop; ballad
- Length: 3:17
- Label: BMG
- Songwriters: Luke Hemmings; Sierra Deaton; Michael Clifford; Michael Pollack
- Producer: Clifford

5 Seconds of Summer singles chronology
"Blender" (2022)	"Older" (2022)	"Lighter" (2024)

Music video
- "Older" on YouTube

"Older" is a song by Australian pop rock band 5 Seconds of Summer featuring Vietnamese-American singer-songwriter Sierra Deaton. It was released on 7 September 2022, as the fifth and final single from their fifth studio album 5SOS5 following "Blender".

== Background and composition ==
"Older" is a sentimental-pop ballad and a duet between lead singer Luke Hemmings and his fiancée Sierra Deaton. The song deals with the themes of desire to be forever with a partner, knowing that they will be broken if the partner leaves, and not wanting to grow older and one step closer to a demise of yourself or a loved one.

It was written by Hemmings, Deaton, fellow member Michael Clifford, and Michael Pollack and produced by Clifford. In an Instagram post, Deaton described the background of and her experience with the song:

This is one of the most special records I’ve ever been a part of. Luke and I started this idea in our living room back in March 2019 as an ode to 50’s love songs, but it wasn’t until he jokingly sent a voice memo of it years later that Michael [Clifford] convinced us we needed to finish it together. And I’m so happy he did. I stopped pursuing an artist career a long time ago as I feel most comfortable being behind the scenes… but I’ve never stopped loving to sing. So an extra special thank you to my friends in 5sos for wanting to keep my voice on the final version.

— Sierra Deaton

== Critical reception ==
"Older" was met with generally positive reviews by music critics. Caitlin Chatterton from The Line of Best Fit called the track 5SOS5's "showstopper." Sara De Ledesma from Melodic similarly called the song a standout track on the album. Cara-Louise Scott from The Indiependent praised the vocal performance by saying "the strong sweet vocals from Luke with the delicate voice of Sierra blends like a smoothie."

== Music video ==
A music video for "Older" premiered on 18 October 2022 and was directing by Frank and Ivanna Borin. The video depicts several couples, families, and other groups of people savoring the last few moments of their and each other's lives as a meteor plummets into Earth. They hug, kiss, and smile as the meteor's blast wave reaches them and fire engulfs their surroundings and bodies. The video contains no pandemonious reactions from anyone as to relate to the theme and atmosphere of the song.

== Personnel ==
Credits for "Older" adapted from Apple Music.

Musicians

- Luke Hemmings – composer, guitar, vocals
- Sierra Deaton – composer, vocals
- Michael Clifford – composer, guitar, programming
- Calum Hood – bass, keyboards
- Ashton Irwin – drums

Additional musicians

- Michael Pollack – composer, keyboards
- Zander Caruso – programming

Production

- Caruso – production
- Clifford – production
- Chris Gehringer – engineering
- Eli Heisler – mixing assistant
- Andy Inadomi – engineering
- Rob Kinelski – mixing
