= Take My Hand (5 Seconds of Summer song) =

Single by 5 Seconds of Summer

from the album 5SOS5
- Released: 1 April 2022
- Length: 3:59
- Label: BMG
- Songwriter: Luke Hemmings
- Producer: Michael Clifford

5 Seconds of Summer singles chronology
"Complete Mess" (2022)	"Take My Hand" (2022)	"Me Myself & I" (2022)

"Take My Hand" is a song by Australian pop rock band 5 Seconds of Summer. It was released on 1 April 2022 as the second single from their fifth studio album 5SOS5.

== Background and composition ==
The band teased the song on 31 March 2022 via social media. The song was written by lead singer Luke Hemmings and was produced by guitarist Michael Clifford. Hemmings spoke about the song and its meaning.

"'Take My Hand' is a song the band is extremely proud of. We’re always proud of what we create, but this one is special. This one really feels like the heart of 5SOS. It’s about the fear of change in yourself and becoming accustomed to how you’ve always been. This song speaks on finally embracing that fear and embracing changes, because they’re changes for the better. It’s about realizing how lucky you are and never letting go of the one who helped you get to that place."

The track runs at 126 BPM and is in the key of C major.

== Personnel ==
Credits for "Take My Hand" adapted from AllMusic.

Musicians

- Luke Hemmings – composer, guitar, programmer, keyboards, vocals
- Michael Clifford – guitar, keyboards, producer, programmer, backing vocals
- Calum Hood – bass, keyboards, backing vocals
- Ashton Irwin – backing vocals, drums, keyboards

Production

- Neal Avron – engineering
- Chris Gehringer – engineering
- Chris Kasych – engineering
- Matt Pauling – engineering
- Scott Skrzynski – mixing assistant

== Charts ==
Chart performance for "Take My Hand"
Chart (2022)	Peak position
Australia Independent Singles (AIR)	5
Ireland (IRMA)	72
New Zealand Hot Singles (RMNZ)	12
UK Singles Downloads (OCC)	54

== Release history ==
Release history for "Take My Hand"
Region	Date	Format	Label	Ref.
Various	1 April 2022	Digital download; streaming	BMG	
