= Complete Mess =

Single by 5 Seconds of Summer

from the album 5SOS5
- Released: 2 March 2022
- Studio: Rancho V; Dragonfly Creek
- Genre: Alternative rock; pop
- Length: 3:26
- Label: BMG
- Songwriters: Michael Clifford; Luke Hemmings; Calum Hood; Ashton Irwin
- Producer: Michael Clifford

5 Seconds of Summer singles chronology
"2011" (2021)	"Complete Mess" (2022)	"Take My Hand" (2022)

Music video
- "Complete Mess" on YouTube

"Complete Mess" (stylised in all caps) is a song by Australian pop rock band 5 Seconds of Summer. It was released on 2 March 2022 independently in partnership with BMG, as the lead single from their fifth studio album 5SOS5. The song was written by the band and produced by guitarist Michael Clifford.

At the APRA Music Awards of 2023, the song was shortlisted for Song of the Year.

== Background ==
The band teased "Complete Mess" in February 2022 sharing snippets of the song on TikTok and Twitter. Upon the release of "Complete Mess", the group also released a statement about the song:

"For this record we realized if you want something done that truly represents how you feel, you’ve got to do it yourselves. We wanted that expansive sound that we naturally gravitate towards when we play together, so we had to learn how to record that. This new music is so authentically us. It’s exactly the kind of music we want to be making right now and it’s a good song to be able to reconnect to our fans after such a long time of not releasing music. We can’t wait for everyone to hear what we’ve been working on."

The song was recorded at Rancho V in Joshua Tree, Clifford's own home studio and Dragonfly Creek in Malibu. The title of the song refers to a fan-favorite t-shirt that lead singer Luke Hemmings used to wear.

MTV describes the song as a "2000s alt-rock with a more mature but quite nostalgic sound," while Rolling Stone calls the song, "an expansive vibe with contemporary pop sensibilities."

== Composition ==
The track runs at 81 beats per minute and is in the key of D Mixolydian, using a I-v-IV-I chord progression in the verses and a I-v-♭VII-I progression for the chorus. The band's vocals span from F♯3 to A4.

== Reception ==
"Complete Mess" was received with positive reviews, most praising the band for their growth and maturity of their sound. Soundigest.com calls it, "a song that's sheer emotional power sends chills down your body." Musictalkers.com praises the instrumental work of the song stating, "the utilization of authentic instruments layered with electronic, booming pop sounds is the contrast that perfectly mirrors 5 Seconds of Summer’s original vision when they first entered the music scene."

== Music video ==
The music video for "Complete Mess" was released on 2 March 2022 and was directed by Lauren Dunn. The video is set in a desert and the quartet can be seen lying on their backs on the sand and walking in separate ways throughout the video. Towards the end, they join together and walk towards a blue orb of light, which represents "the place where all the songs, all the love, and everything comes from in this life," according to drummer Ashton Irwin. He also adds, "I guess the metaphorical sense is that the four of us are in this infinite place of creation, and the dessert represents that."

== Personnel ==
Credits for "Complete Mess" adapted from AllMusic.

Musicians

- Luke Hemmings – rhythm guitar, keyboards, vocals, composer
- Michael Clifford – lead guitar, vocals, composer, producer
- Calum Hood – bass, keyboards, vocals, composer
- Ashton Irwin – drums, keyboards, backing vocals, composer

Production

- Neal Avron – engineering
- Chris Gehringer – engineering
- Jacob Munk – engineering
- Tim Nelson – producer
- Scott Skrzynski – mixing assistant

== Charts ==
=== Weekly charts ===
Weekly chart performance for "Complete Mess"
Chart (2022)	Peak position
Australia Independent Singles (AIR)	2
Brazil (Pop Internacional)	5
Canada CHR/Top 40 (Billboard)	29
Canada Hot AC (Billboard)	33
Mexico Ingles Airplay (Billboard)	14
Netherlands (Dutch Top 40)	11
Netherlands (Single Top 100)	71
New Zealand Hot Singles (RMNZ)	12
UK Singles Downloads (Official Charts)	53
US Billboard Hot 100	85
US Adult Pop Airplay (Billboard)	11
US Pop Airplay (Billboard)	19

=== Year-end charts ===
2022 year-end chart performance for "Complete Mess"
Chart (2022)	Position
Netherlands (Dutch Top 40)	70
US Adult Top 40 (Billboard)	48

== Release history ==
Release history and formats for "Complete Mess"
Region	Date	Format	Label	Ref.
Various	2 March 2022	Digital download; streaming	BMG	
Italy	4 March 2022	Contemporary hit radio	BMG	
United States	8 March 2022	Contemporary hit radio	BMG	
