= Boy (EP) =

EP by Luke Hemmings
- Released: 26 April 2024
- Length: 24:02
- Producer: Sammy Witte; Elie Rizk

Luke Hemmings chronology
When Facing the Things We Turn Away From (2021)	Boy (2024)

Singles from Boy
- 1. "Shakes" Released: 6 March 2024; 2. "Close My Eyes" Released: 5 April 2024

Boy is an extended play and second solo release by Australian singer-songwriter Luke Hemmings. It was released on 26 April 2024. The EP features background vocals from Hemmings wife Sierra Deaton.

Writing about the inspiration for the project on social media, Hemming said "I wrote these songs in a moment in my life when I found myself questioning everything I thought I knew about the world & myself. All the emotions, fears and grief that came with it."

== Tour ==
On 12 March 2024, Hemmings announced Nostalgia for a Time That Never Existed (a tour by Luke Hemmings). The tour began on 4 May 2024, in Paris, France, and concluded on 21 November 2024 in Atlanta, Georgia, US.

On 6 December 2024, Hemmings released the live EP Nostalgia (Live from Los Angeles), which consists of 7 tracks recorded during the tour.

== Track listing ==
Boy track listing
No.	Title	Writer(s)	Producer(s)	Length
1.	"I'm Still Your Boy"	Luke Hemmings, Sammy Witte	Sammy Witte	3:56
2.	"Shakes"	Hemmings, Witte	Witte	3:15
3.	"Benny"	Hemmings, Witte, Elie Rizk	Witte, Elie Rizk	2:52
4.	"Close My Eyes"	Hemmings, Witte	Witte	2:50
5.	"Garden Life"	Hemmings, Witte	Witte	3:07
6.	"Close Enough to Feel You"	Hemmings, Witte	Witte	3:33
7.	"Promises"	Hemmings, Witte	Witte	4:32
Total length:				24:02

== Personnel ==
Musicians

- Luke Hemmings – vocals
- Sierra Deaton – background vocals (6, 7)
- Mason Stoops – electric guitar
- Rob Humphreys – drums

Technical

- Sammy Witte – producer, engineer
- Elie Rizk – producer (3), engineer (3)
- Luke Hemmings – additional producer (1–3, 5–7)
- George Janho – assistant engineer (5 and 6)
- George Janko – assistant engineer (4)
- Henri Cash – assistant engineer (1–3, 6 and 7)
- Mirza Sheriff – assistant engineer
- Nigel Wilton – assistant engineer (2–7)
- Kevin Smith – engineer
- Oliver Straus – engineer (2)
- Rachel White – engineer (2–7)
- Joe LaPorta – mastering engineer
- Michael Freeman – mixing engineer

== Charts ==
Chart performance for Boy
Chart (2024)	Peak position
Australian Albums (ARIA)	4
Belgian Albums (Ultratop Flanders)	70
Belgian Albums (Ultratop Wallonia)	122
Dutch Albums (Album Top 100)	11
Polish Albums (ZPAV)	21
Scottish Albums (OCC)	7
UK Albums (OCC)	22
US Billboard 200	99
US Top Rock & Alternative Albums (Billboard)	22
