= 5SOS5 =

Studio album by 5 Seconds of Summer
- Released: 23 September 2022
- Recorded: 2020–2022
- Studio: Joshua Tree National Park
- Length: 48:08
- Label: BMG
- Producers: 5 Seconds of Summer; Michael Clifford; Colin Brittain; Jason Evigan; John Feldmann; Jon Bellion; Pete Nappi; Peter Thomas; Rami Yacoub; Matthew Pauling; Sly; Wylie Hopkins

5 Seconds of Summer chronology
Calm (2020)	5SOS5 (2022)	The Feeling of Falling Upwards (2023)

Singles from 5SOS5
- 1. "Complete Mess" Released: 2 March 2022; 2. "Take My Hand" Released: 1 April 2022; 3. "Me Myself & I" Released: 11 May 2022; 4. "Blender" Released: 13 July 2022; 5. "Older" Released: 7 September 2022

5SOS5 is the fifth studio album by the Australian pop rock band 5 Seconds of Summer, released on 23 September 2022 through BMG Rights Management. It was preceded by the release of the singles "Complete Mess", "Take My Hand", "Me Myself & I", "Blender" and "Older" (featuring Vietnamese-American singer Sierra Deaton, partner of band member Luke Hemmings). The track list was revealed on 10 May 2022, while the album was announced alongside the release of "Me Myself & I" on 11 May 2022.

The band promoted the album whilst on the Take My Hand World Tour, which officially began in Dublin on 3 April 2022. "Easy for You to Say" and "Blender" were first performed live on the tour. It was further promoted with The 5 Seconds of Summer Show Tour, which began in South America in July 2023.

== Background ==
5 Seconds of Summer spent two years working on the album, beginning after the release of Calm in 2020. Luke Hemmings called the lyrical content written for the album "extremely introspective". The band wrote and produced most of the album themselves, including the first two singles, "Complete Mess" and "Take My Hand".

== Singles ==
The album's lead single, "Complete Mess", was released on 2 March 2022. It reached number 85 on the US Billboard Hot 100 in April 2022.

The second single, "Take My Hand", followed on 1 April 2022, and charted at number 72 on the Irish Singles Chart.

Third single "Me Myself & I" was released alongside the album announcement on 11 May 2022. It peaked at number 90 on the ARIA Singles Chart.

The fourth single "Blender" was released with no prior announcement on 13 July 2022, after the band had begun performing it live on the Take My Hand tour.

The fifth single "Older" (featuring Sierra Deaton) was released on 7 September 2022, after the band released a snippet of Hemmings singing "Older" on their social media pages the previous day; however, it was not announced the song would be released the next day. A video of the song, featuring an end-of-the-world scenario, was released on 18 October 2022.

The promotional single "Bad Omens" was released on 23 September 2022. A video of the song, featuring a romance car, was released on 26 September 2022.

== Critical reception ==
Professional ratings
Review scores
Source	Rating
AllMusic	4/5 stars
Clash	8/10
The Line of Best Fit	8/10

Matt Collar of AllMusic gave the album a 4 out of 5 stars and wrote that "much of the album brings to mind the Weeknd's distinctive brand of atmospheric pop -- songs shot through with a yearning, after-hours regret and spiritual modern-rock uplift". He praised the songs "Complete Mess", "Me Myself & I", "Take My Hand", and "Bad Omens". Clash called the album 5 Seconds of Summer's "most cohesive and impressive work to date". Cara-Louise Scott from The Indiependent praised it as "a beautifully hand-crafted album, symbolising eleven years of the band's musical experience."

The album debuted at number two on the Billboard 200 with 48,000 equivalent album units sold in its first week in the US, including 36,000 in pure album sales. The album charted in the top 10 in an additional ten countries, including at number one in the UK and Australia.

== Track listing ==
5SOS5 track listing
No.	Title	Writer(s)	Producer(s)	Length
1.	"Complete Mess"	Luke Hemmings; Ashton Irwin; Calum Hood; Michael Clifford	Clifford	3:26
2.	"Easy for You to Say"	Hemmings; Irwin; Hood; Clifford	Clifford	4:00
3.	"Bad Omens"	Hemmings; Irwin; James Abrahart; Sarah Hudson; Jason Evigan	Evigan	3:35
4.	"Me Myself & I"	Hemmings; Irwin; Hood; Clifford; Mick Coogan; Jon Bellion; Evigan; Pete Nappi	Bellion; Evigan; Nappi	2:57
5.	"Take My Hand" (Joshua Tree version)	Hemmings	Clifford	4:57
6.	"Carousel"	Hemmings; Irwin; Hood; Clifford; Sierra Deaton	Clifford	3:56
7.	"Older" (featuring Sierra Deaton)	Hemmings; Clifford; Deaton; Michael Pollack	Clifford	3:17
8.	"Haze"	Hemmings; Irwin; Hood; Clifford	5 Seconds of Summer; Matthew Pauling	3:33
9.	"You Don't Go to Parties"	Irwin; Hood; Colin Brittain; Elijah Noll	Colin Brittain	3:15
10.	"Blender"	Hemmings; Irwin; Hood; Jacob Torrey; Peter Thomas	Thomas	2:27
11.	"Caramel"	Hemmings; Irwin; Hood; John Feldmann	Feldmann	3:10
12.	"Best Friends"	Hemmings; Irwin; Hood; Clifford	Feldmann; Clifford	3:11
13.	"Bleach"	Hemmings; Irwin; Hood; Clifford	Wylie Hopkins; Clifford	3:01
14.	"Red Line"	Hemmings; Irwin; Hood; Clifford	Clifford	3:23
15.	"Moodswings"	Hemmings; Irwin; Hood; Clifford; Sarah Aarons	Clifford	2:34
16.	"Flatline"	Hemmings; Irwin; Brian Lee; Rami Yacoub; Sylvester Sivertsen	Sly; Yacoub	3:03
17.	"Emotions"	Hood; Clifford; Nick Long	Clifford	3:18
18.	"Bloodhound"	Hemmings; Irwin; Hood; Clifford; Mike Score; Ali Score; Franais Maudsley; Paul Reynolds	Clifford	3:22
19.	"Tears!"	Irwin; Brittain; Noll	Brittain	3:27
Total length:				63:52

Notes

- Physical pressings of the album were issued in two versions: standard and deluxe. The standard version features only the first 14 tracks, while deluxe version includes full tracklist.
- On vinyl, "Carousel" and "Blender" are switched places.
- Japanese edition features full tracklist and also includes acoustic version of "Complete Mess" as a bonus track.
- "Complete Mess", "Carousel", "Haze", "Blender", and "Tears!" are stylized in all caps.
- The album version of "Take My Hand" is fifty eight seconds longer than the original; it contains a voice memo from Luke Hemmings, recorded in Joshua Tree National Park.

== Personnel ==
5 Seconds of Summer

- Luke Hemmings – guitar, lead vocals (tracks 1–8, 10–16, 18), keyboards (tracks 1–6, 8, 10–13, 15–19), backing vocals (tracks 1–6, 8–15, 17–19), producer (track 8 (Note: Credited as 5 Seconds of Summer)), instrumentation (tracks 5, 8), programmer (tracks 5, 8)
- Michael Clifford – guitar (tracks 1–2, 4–19), lead vocals (tracks 1–2, 10, 12–13, 15, 17–18), keyboards (tracks 1–6, 8, 10–13, 15–19), backing vocals (tracks 1–6, 8–19), producer (tracks 1–2, 5–8, 12–15, 17–18), instrumentation (tracks 1–2, 5–8, 12, 14–15, 17–18), programmer (tracks 1–2, 5–8, 12–15, 17–18), vocal producer (track 4)
- Calum Hood – bass guitar, lead vocals (tracks 1, 6, 8–10, 13, 15, 18), guitar (track 11), keyboards (all tracks), backing vocals (tracks 1–6, 8–19), producer (track 8), instrumentation (track 8), programmer (track 8)
- Ashton Irwin – drums, lead vocals (tracks 8–9, 11, 19), keyboards (tracks 1–6, 8–13, 15–19), backing vocals (tracks 1–6, 8–19), producer (track 8), instrumentation (track 8), programmer (track 8)

Additional musicians

- James Abrahart – background vocals (track 3)
- Colin "Doc" Brittain – keyboards (track 9)
- Sierra Deaton – lead vocals (track 7)
- Jason Evigan – guitar (track 3), synthesizer (tracks 3–4)
- Elijah Noll – backing vocals (track 19)
- Michael Pollack – keyboards (track 7)
- Jacob Scesney – saxophone (track 10)
- Sly – keyboards (track 16)
- Mark Schick – guitar (track 3)
- Peter Thomas – keyboards (track 10), background vocals (track 10)

Technical personnel

- Neal Avron – engineer (tracks 1, 5–6)
- Courtney Ballard – engineer (track 2)
- Jon Bellion – producer (track 4)
- Chris Bennion – assistant mix engineer (track 2)
- Michael Bono – engineer (track 11)
- Bryce Bordone – assistant mixer (tracks 4, 16)
- Colin "Doc" Brittain – producer (tracks 9, 19), instrumentation (tracks 9, 19), programmer (tracks 9, 19), vocal producer (tracks 9, 19)
- Zander Caruso – additional production (tracks 6–7), instrumentation (track 7), programmer (track 7), additional programmer (track 17), drum programmer (tracks 15, 17)
- Lionel Crasta – engineer (tracks 3–4), vocal producer (tracks 3–4)
- Tommy Dietrick – engineer
- Jason Evigan – producer (tracks 3–4), drum programmer (tracks 3–4), vocal producer (track 3)
- Rafael Fadul – engineer (tracks 3–4)
- John Feldmann – producer (tracks 11–12), instrumentation (track 11), programmer (track 11)
- Michael Freeman – engineer (tracks 8, 12, 15, 17, 19)
- Chris Gehringer – engineer (tracks 1–19)
- Serban Ghenea – engineer (tracks 4, 16)
- Eli Heisler – assistant mixer (track 7)
- Cameron Hogan – engineer (tracks 3–4)
- Wylie Hopkins – producer (track 13), instrumentation (track 13), programmer (track 13)
- Andy Inadomi – engineer (tracks 7, 15)
- Chris Kasych – engineer (tracks 2, 4–6, 8, 12–14)
- James Krausse – engineer (track 2)
- Rob Kinelski – engineer (track 7)
- Kevin McCombs – engineer (track 9, 19), additional production (tracks 9, 19)
- Dylan McLean – engineer (tracks 11–12)
- Jacob Munk – engineer (tracks 1–2, 6, 18–19)
- Pete Nappi – producer (track 4)
- Tim Nelson – additional production (track 1)
- Chris "Tek" O'Ryan – vocal producer (track 1)
- Matthew Pauling – producer (track 8), engineer (tracks 2–6, 8, 10, 15–16), instrumentation (track 8), programmer (track 8), vocal producer (track 6)
- Jackson Rau – engineer (tracks 3–4)
- Scott Skrzynski – assistant mixer (tracks 1, 5–6)
- Tyler Spry – additional production (tracks 2, 18)
- Sly – producer (track 16), engineer (track 16), instrumentation (track 16), programmer (track 16)
- Spike Stent – engineer (tracks 2–3, 9–11, 13–14, 18)
- Scott Stewart – engineer (tracks 11–12)
- Peter Thomas – producer (track 10), engineer (track 10), drum programmer (track 10)
- Josh Thornberry – engineer (tracks 11–12)
- Jake Torrey – additional production (track 10)
- Matt Wolach – assistant mixer (tracks 2–3, 9–11, 13–14, 18)
- Rami Yacoub – producer (track 16), engineer (track 16), instrumentation (track 16), programmer (track 16)

== Charts ==
=== Weekly charts ===
Chart performance for 5SOS5
Chart (2022)	Peak position
Australian Albums (ARIA)	1
Austrian Albums (Ö3 Austria)	9
Belgian Albums (Ultratop Flanders)	5
Belgian Albums (Ultratop Wallonia)	13
Canadian Albums (Billboard)	3
Danish Albums (Hitlisten)	32
Dutch Albums (Album Top 100)	1
Finnish Albums (Suomen virallinen lista)	33
French Albums (SNEP)	56
German Albums (Offizielle Top 100)	5
Hungarian Albums (MAHASZ)	38
Irish Albums (Official Charts)	12
Italian Albums (FIMI)	28
New Zealand Albums (RMNZ)	3
Norwegian Albums (VG-lista)	15
Polish Albums (ZPAV)	6
Portuguese Albums (AFP)	14
Scottish Albums (Official Charts)	1
Spanish Albums (Promusicae)	15
Swiss Albums (Schweizer Hitparade)	16
UK Albums (Official Charts)	1
UK Independent Albums (Official Charts)	1
US Billboard 200	2

=== Year-end charts ===
Year-end chart performance for 5SOS5
Chart (2022)	Position
Australian Artist (ARIA)	35

== Release history ==
Release formats and history for 5SOS5
Region	Date	Format(s)	Edition(s)	Label	Ref.
Various	23 September 2022	Cassette; CD; digital download; streaming; vinyl	Standard	BMG	
Various	23 September 2022	CD	Deluxe	BMG	
