= Alex & Sierra =

American pop duo

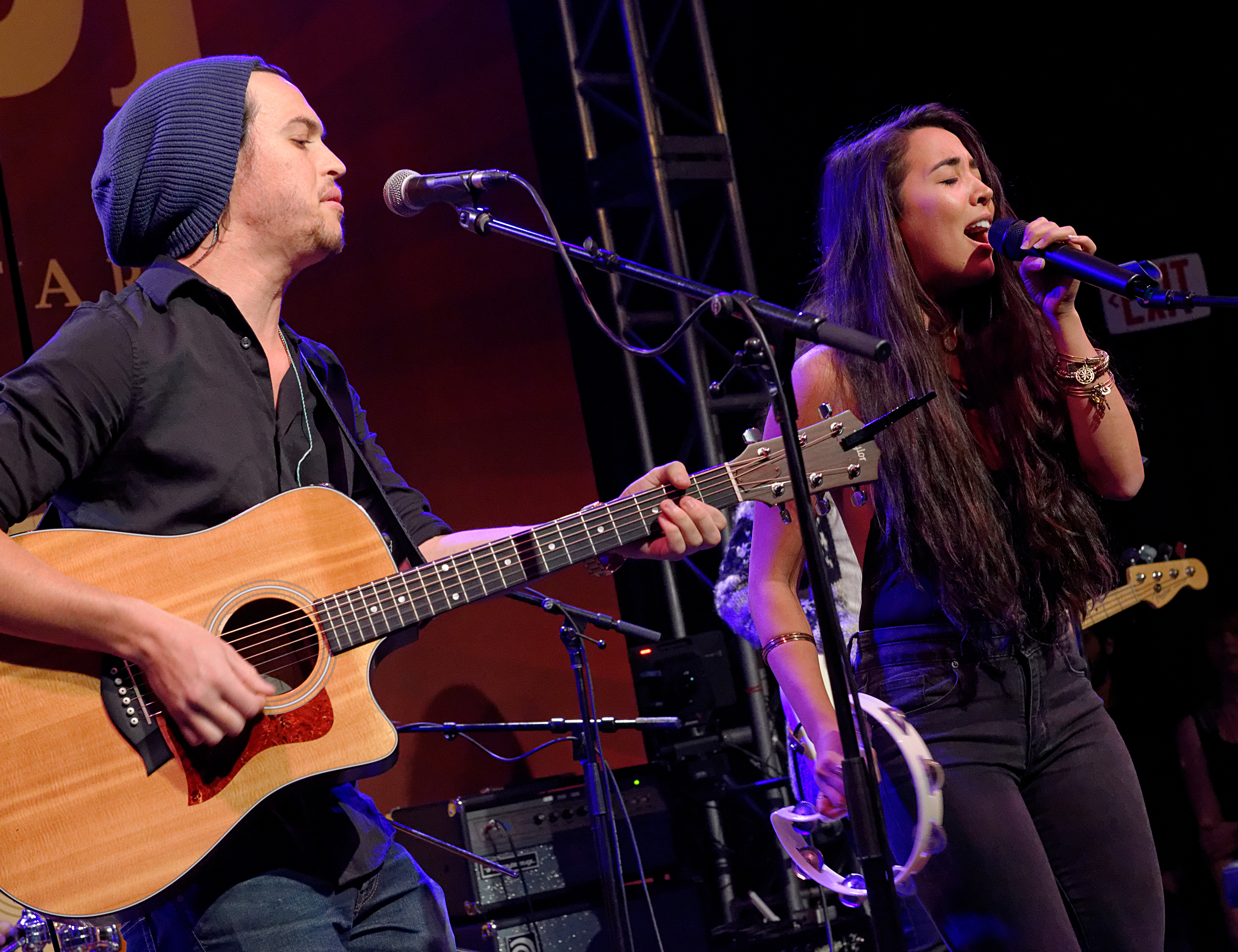
- Alex & Sierra at the Winter NAMM Show in 2015

Background information
- Origin: Daytona Beach, Florida, US (Alex Kinsey); Orlando, Florida, US (Sierra Deaton)
- Genres: Folk-pop, indie pop
- Years active: 2013–2016
- Label: Syco/Columbia (past)
- Past members: Alex Kinsey; Sierra Deaton

Alex & Sierra were an American duo consisting of Alex Kinsey (born September 8, 1991) and Sierra Deaton (born February 11, 1991), who won the third and final season of The X Factor. They were mentored by Simon Cowell. Their debut album It's About Us was released on October 7, 2014, on Columbia Records. Their EP As Seen on TV was released on September 30, 2016.

On September 1, 2017, Alex & Sierra announced to the media that they had broken up more than a year earlier, and would no longer continue to make music together, but would branch out into their own solo careers.

== Career ==
=== 2013: The X Factor ===
Alex & Sierra auditioned in New Orleans, Louisiana, making it to the next round after wowing the judges with a sultry version of Britney Spears' "Toxic". They continued on to the top 40 and received Simon Cowell as their mentor. For the Four Chair Challenge, Alex & Sierra took on the John Travolta/Olivia Newton-John classic "You're The One That I Want" from the 1978 musical film Grease. The judges praised the duo for putting their own twist on the song. Kelly Rowland and Paulina Rubio felt the performance was "nice" and said they had "sexiness" to them, while Demi Lovato told them they were one of their favorite acts but questioned the future and their relationship. Despite this controversy, the duo made it through to the live shows.

For the first live show, Alex and Sierra earned a spot in the top 12 after performing a stripped-down version of the Robin Thicke hit "Blurred Lines". Kelly Rowland wished it had been a bit sexier and thought it got corny at times, something Simon Cowell disagreed with, praising Alex & Sierra's performance, calling it "original" and "unique". For Motown Night, they took on "I Heard It Through The Grapevine" by Marvin Gaye. Paulina felt it was "natural," while Demi said it felt "organic" as well as very "hot" and "sexy". On the re-vote show, which happened due to a graphics error that nullified the votes, Alex & Sierra sang "Give Me Love" by Ed Sheeran; Cowell afterward said that the performance was "immaculate... ragged and raw."

For '80s Night, the couple took on the Robert Palmer classic "Addicted to Love". The performance earned them negative reviews; Kelly wanted them together more, Paulina called them "Bohemian" and "vintage", Demi felt that Sierra looked uncomfortable in her shoes and wanted the performance more organic, and their mentor Simon expressed disappointment over how the performance went by saying that they lost the melody in the beginning and "it wasn't as good as it should have been." For British Invasion night, Alex & Sierra took on the One Direction hit "Best Song Ever". Demi Lovato called it their best performance and said they planned to download the song on iTunes. However, Sierra's vocals were criticized for not being as strong as Alex's. Their version charted on the top 40 of the US iTunes, the first act to do so that season.

For Big Band night, Alex & Sierra performed Taylor Swift's hit "I Knew You Were Trouble". Demi said that they didn't like the arrangement at first, but Alex & Sierra made them like it by the end. Simon said that their arrangement was clever and cool and not obvious, and also praised Sierra: "You just shut up the witches of Eastwick here because that was a great, great vocal performance." They later faced off against the others in a group performance of "Cry Me A River", in which they received praise from Kelly, who said they "soared".

For Divas/Unplugged night, the couple sang two songs. Their "Diva" song was "Say My Name" by Destiny's Child. The song earned them praise from Kelly, who said she adored the new sassy side of Sierra. Their "Unplugged" song, "Say Something" by A Great Big World and Christina Aguilera (thought by many as their best X Factor performance) earned them praise by the judges; Kelly said she felt like she was watching an awards show, Demi felt that the performance was "magical", Paulina was impressed with Sierra's talent with the piano, and Simon stated that this was not only their best performance of the night but of the season. Their version of the song hit number one on the US iTunes charts, which was the first time that a song from the US X Factor reached the top position.

For the semi-final, the public chose "Little Talks" by Of Monsters and Men, which pleased the judges; Kelly said they nailed it, Demi felt they were looking at the winners, Paulina said that they kept coming back stronger and suggested that there was a huge gap in the industry for them, and Simon said they were not just performing - they were making records each week. They faced Carlito Olivero in The Duet Duels singing "Falling Slowly" with the judges feeling that while Carlito and Alex did well, Sierra stole the song. but it was their performance of "Gravity" by Sara Bareilles that earned high remarks. The judges felt that Sierra had blossomed during the competition, Alex's vocals were "fricking crazy" and their performance was "perfect." Like "Say Something" before it, the couple's version of "Gravity" hit number 1 on iTunes.

For the finals, Alex & Sierra sang three songs. They did their "save me" song from the re-vote show as their "song to win", "Give Me Love" by Ed Sheeran. They also sang "Bleeding Love" with Leona Lewis, and their "song of the season" was "Say Something". The "Bleeding Love" performance received a bit of a mixed response mainly from Demi Lovato, who said that it wasn't their best performance, but the other two songs received praise. In the finale result show, Alex & Sierra performed "All I Want For Christmas Is You". Later that night, they were announced the winners of the season on December 19, 2013. They were the only group to win the American version of the show. In an interview after the winner was announced, Simon Cowell revealed that Alex and Sierra received the most public votes every week of the competition. He said that the margin for the number of votes narrowed closer to the end of the season.

==== Performances on The X Factor ====
denotes having reached within the top ten of the iTunes chart.

Show	Theme	Song	Original artist	Result
Audition	Free choice	"Toxic"	Britney Spears	Advanced to four-chair challenge
4-Chair Challenge	Free choice	"You're the One That I Want"	John Travolta and Olivia Newton-John	Advanced to Live Shows
Top 16	Mentor's choice	"Blurred Lines"	Robin Thicke	Saved by Simon Cowell
Top 13	Motown	"I Heard It Through the Grapevine"	Gladys Knight & The Pips	Safe
Top 13	Save Me Songs	"Give Me Love"	Ed Sheeran	Safe (1st)
Top 13	80's night	"Addicted to Love"	Robert Palmer	Safe (1st)
Top 10	British invasion night	"Best Song Ever"	One Direction	Safe (1st)
Top 8	Big band night	"I Knew You Were Trouble"	Taylor Swift	Safe (2nd)
Top 6	Divas	"Say My Name"	Destiny's Child	Safe (1st)
Top 6	Unplugged songs	"Say Something"	A Great Big World and Christina Aguilera	Safe (1st)
Top 4	Viewers' choice	"Little Talks"	Of Monsters and Men	Safe (1st)
Top 4	Duet (with Carlito Olivero)	"Falling Slowly"	Glen Hansard and Markéta Irglová	Safe (1st)
Top 4	Songs to get you to the final	"Gravity"	Sara Bareilles	Safe (1st)
Finale	Song to win	"Give Me Love"	Ed Sheeran	Safe (1st)
Finale	Duet (with Leona Lewis)	"Bleeding Love"	Leona Lewis	Safe (1st)
Finale	Song of the season	"Say Something"	A Great Big World and Christina Aguilera	Safe (1st)
Finale	Christmas song	"All I Want for Christmas Is You"	Mariah Carey	Winners (1st)

=== 2013–2015: It's About Us and being dropped ===
Following their win on The X Factor, Alex & Sierra announced they would be making their debut album 'quick' and 'right'. They worked with Julian Bunetta, Sam Watters, John Shanks, Toby Gad, Jason Mraz, and Grammy award-winning singer/songwriter John Legend on their album. On May 3, 2014, Alex & Sierra revealed their debut single, "Scarecrow". The lyrical video featuring puppets instead of the singers themselves, was released on May 27, 2014. The song was released to iTunes on June 23, 2014. 'Scarecrow' was promoted with a performance on the Today Show on the day of the iTunes release. It sold 30,000 copies in its first week of release. The music video for Scarecrow was released on July 11, 2014. The next day, Alex & Sierra announced the title and artwork of their debut album, "It's About Us." Along with the pre-order of the album on July 15, "Little Do You Know" was made available as a promotional single. "Just Kids", the second promotional single, premiered on August 4, 2014. On August 24, "Bumper Cars" was released as the third promotional single. Two weeks later, on September 17, "Here We Go" was released as the fourth promotional single and peaked at #4 on the iTunes singles charts.

Somewhere around July 2015, Alex and Sierra were dropped by their record label without any formal communication.

=== 2016–2017: As Seen on TV and their break up ===
On March 6, 2016, Alex & Sierra announced on their Instagram that they were in the works of releasing an extended play. They stated that the EP would feature songs they'd covered on TV (The X Factor USA) along with some new original songs. They were featured on Gareth Emery's album, 100 Reasons to Live, with a new song, "We Were Young", released March 31, 2016. On August 1, 2016, they announced on their Twitter that their EP As Seen on TV would be available for pre-order on August 5, 2016, and be officially released on September 30, 2016. On August 3, 2016, they released a music video for their cover of Toxic exclusively on Yahoo Music.

On September 1, 2017, Alex & Sierra announced via Twitter that they had broken up a year prior and had attempted to continue as friends. However, they realized that it was time for them to no longer continue making music together, and instead decided to focus on their own careers.

== Members ==
=== Alex Kinsey ===
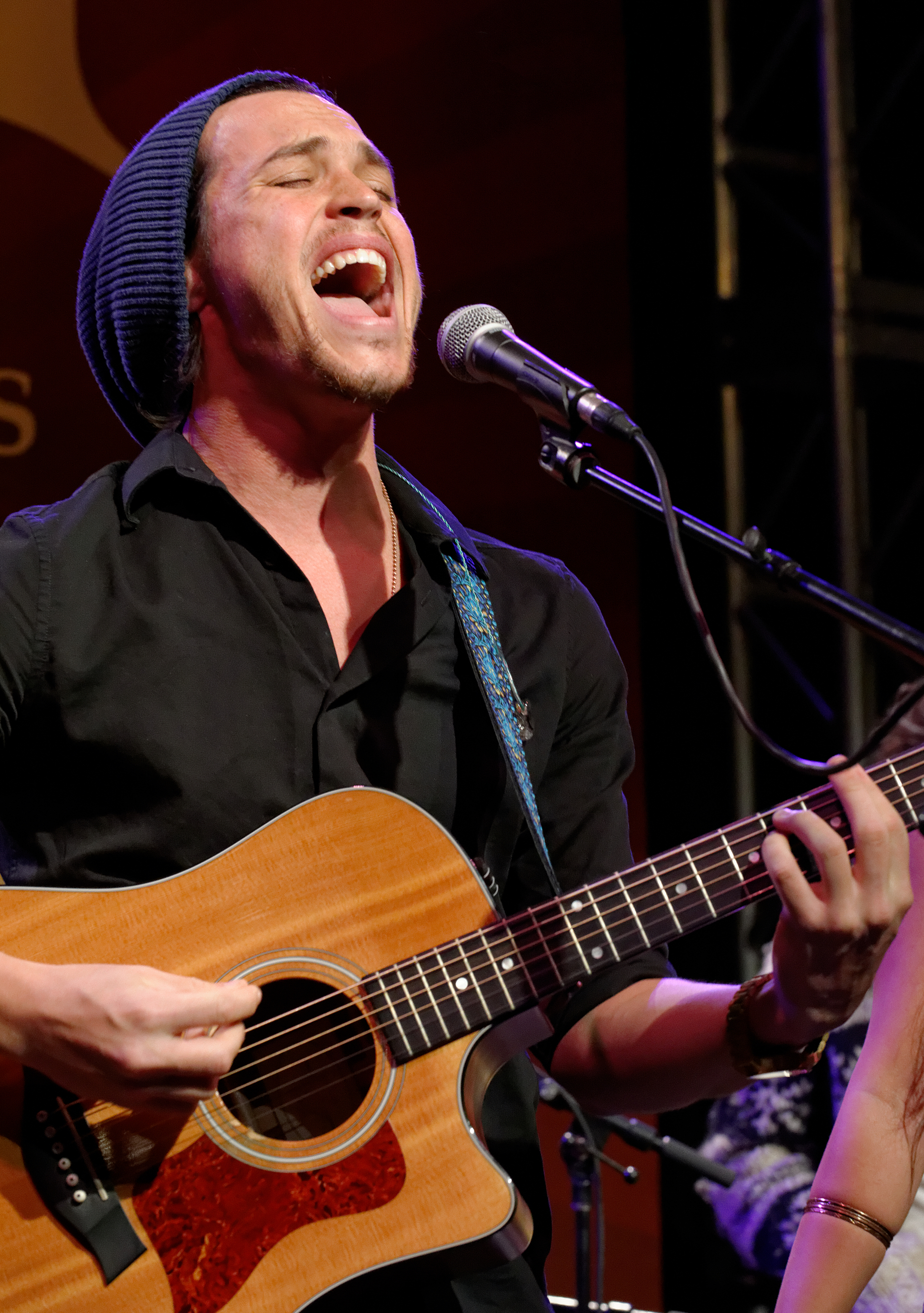

Alex Kinsey (born September 8, 1991), sometimes simply known as KINSEY, is from New Smyrna Beach, Florida, and is an only child. Alex cites Jason Mraz as one of his biggest musical influences, and has seen him live in concert eight times. He has been playing guitar since middle school. Alex attended New Smyrna Beach High School and The University of Central Florida. He is currently making music in the band BoTalks, which is a musical duo made up of Alex and Swedish singer-songwriter & producer Johan Lindbrandt. On 31 May 2019, he released his debut solo EP Party of One.

=== Sierra Phương-Thảo Hemmings ===
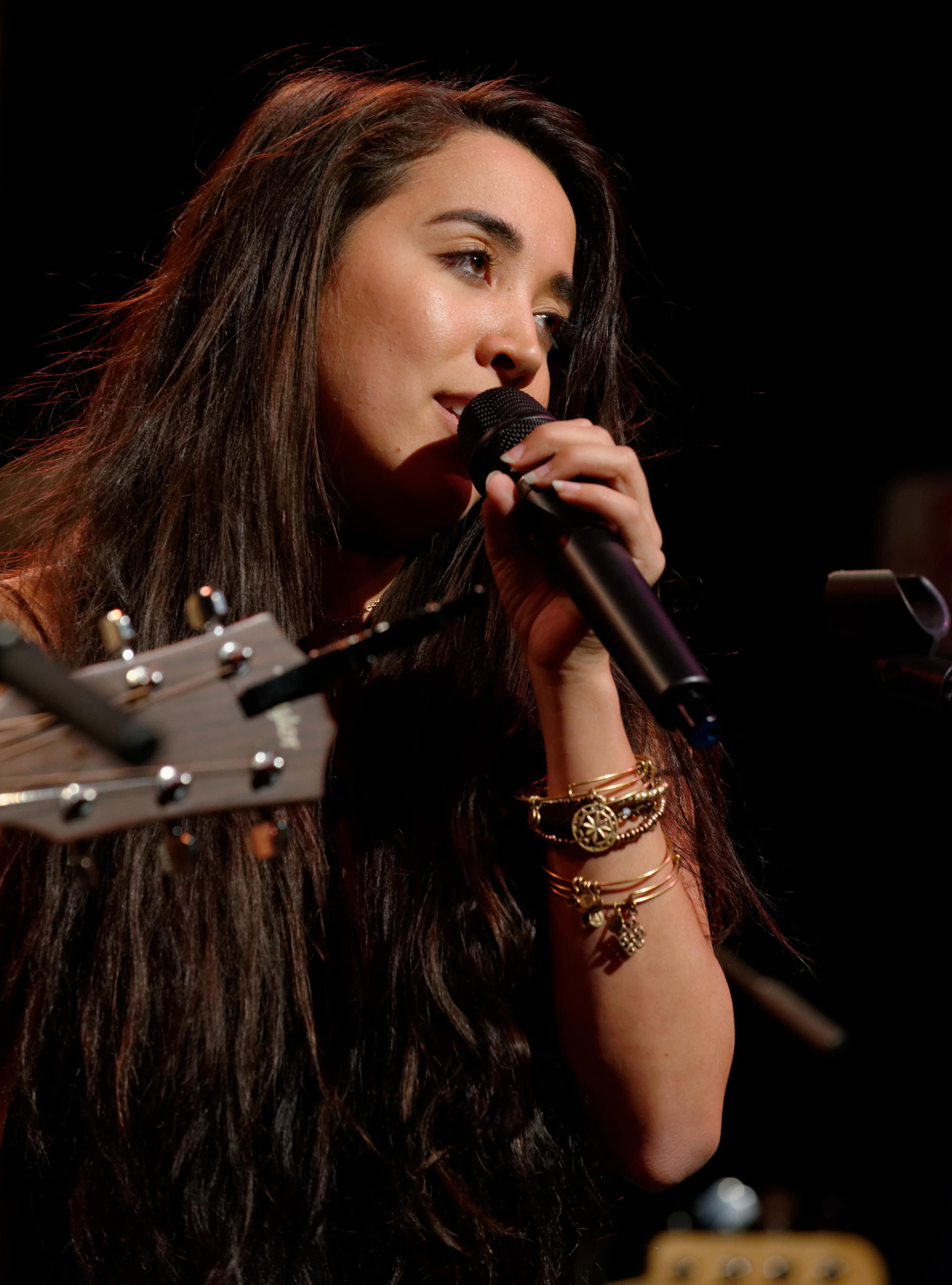

Sierra Phương-Thảo Hemmings (née Deaton; February 11, 1991), is a singer, songwriter and dancer, from Philadelphia, Pennsylvania. Raised in Orlando, Florida, Deaton claims British descent through her father, Dr. John Deaton, and is of Vietnamese descent through her mother, Vu Deaton. She has an older sister named Lara Deaton. Deaton began dancing at the age of two and studied ballet, tap, jazz, hip hop, modern, and more. She competed for eleven years and won three international titles in Irish dancing. She attended Lake Howell High School. Deaton attended The University of Central Florida, studying for an advertising and public relations degree and graduating with honors in 2013.

Following the split of Alex & Sierra, Deaton began releasing music under the stage name, Essy. On 16 February 2018, Deaton released her debut solo single "Don't Hurt". She has since co-written songs and provided backing vocals for artists, including 5 Seconds of Summer for "Lover of Mine", Gnash for "forgive" and Lovelytheband for "coachella". Sierra Deaton is currently signed as a songwriter for Unknown Music Publishing and Kobalt Music Group.

Deaton is openly bisexual. In 2018, Deaton began dating Luke Hemmings of 5 Seconds of Summer. The couple announced their engagement on June 8, 2021, and married in a private ceremony in 2023. On 22 August 2025, Hemmings posted on his Instagram account announcing the arrival of their daughter.

==== Songwriting credits ====
Year	Title	Artist	Album	Notes
2019	"Forgive"	Gnash	Non-album single	Composer, Vocals
2020	"Lover of Mine"	5 Seconds Of Summer	Calm	Composer
2021	"Down to You"	Jagwar Twin		Vocals
2021	"I Like to Party"	Jagwar Twin		Vocals
2021	"Last Time"	little luna		Composer
2021	"Baby Blue"	Luke Hemmings	When Facing the Things We Turn Away From	Composer, Vocals
2021	"Bloodline"	Luke Hemmings	When Facing the Things We Turn Away From	Composer
2021	"Home By Midnight"	Jamie Miller		Composer
2022	"Life Was Easier When I Only Cared About Me"	Bad Suns		Composer
2022	"I Lost Myself In Loving You"	Jamie Miller		Composer
2022	"Under the Wave"	little luna		Composer
2022	"The Glass"	little luna		Composer
2022	"Small Talk"	Francis Karel		Composer
2022	"Freak Show"	Francisco Martin	Manic	Composer
2022	"Break My Heart"	Matt Hansen	Single	Composer
2022	"Older"	5 Seconds Of Summer	5SOS5	Composer, Vocals
2022	"Carousel"	5 Seconds Of Summer	5SOS5	Composer
2022	"want it all"	little luna		Composer
2022	"Somebody's Fool"	Mergui	Dark Side of the Rainbow	Composer
2022	"rollercoaster"	sundial		Composer
2022	"Bed of Roses"	ari hicks	It's Not That Deep: Chapter 2	Composer
2023	"Feed The Fire"	Avery Lynch		Composer
2023	"Nobody's Favorite (Acoustic)"	Grayson and Garret		Composer
2023	"latenight"	Leyla Blue		Composer
2023	"lennon"	little luna		Composer
2023	"Capital F"	Atreyu	A Torch In The Dark	Composer
2023	"Death or Glory" ft. Sierra Deaton	Atreyu	A Torch In The Dark	Composer and Vocals
2023	"Forevermore"	Atreyu	A Torch In The Dark	Composer
2023	"buzzkill"	Leyla Blue	Single	Composer
2023	"Lie"	Gavin Magnus	BLURRY EYES	Composer
2023	"Perfect"	The Veronicas	Gothic Summer	Composer
2024	"The Saddest Part"	EMMY	EP: Mouthful	Composer
2024	"Crying in my Boots"	EMMY	EP: Mouthful	Composer
2024	"Hysteria"	EMMY	EP: Mouthful	Composer
2024	"fool"	little luna	the wildflower woman	Composer
2024	"Invisible"	The Veronicas	Gothic Summer	Composer
2024	"Ribcage"	The Veronicas	Gothic Summer	Composer
2024	"Jungle"	The Veronicas	Gothic Summer	Composer
2024	"Close Enough To Feel You"	Luke Hemmings	boy	Vocals
2024	"Promises"	Luke Hemmings	boy	Vocals
2024	"Ache In My Heart"	Palaye Royale	Death or Glory	Composer, Lyricist
2024	"Traumatized"	Escape the Fate	Out Of The Shadows 2.0	Composer
2024	"Kings Of Nothing"	Escape the Fate	Out Of The Shadows 2.0	Composer
2025	”eclipse”	Michael Clifford	SIDEQUEST	Composer
2025	"Everyone's A Star!"	5 Seconds of Summer	Everyone's A Star!	Composer, Lyricist
2025	"Jawbreaker"	5 Seconds of Summer	Everyone's A Star!	Composer, Lyricist
2025	"Ghost"	5 Seconds of Summer	Everyone's A Star!	Composer, Lyricist
2025	"I'm Scared I'll Never Sleep Again"	5 Seconds of Summer	Everyone's A Star!	Vocals
2025	"Afraid of the Dark"	Appleby	Almost Okay	Composer, Lyricist
2025	"Burning Lungs"	Appleby	Almost Okay	Composer, Lyricist

== Tours ==
- The Good Guys & A Girl Tour (2015, with Andy Grammer and Paradise Fears) – the tour began in Seattle, WA at The Showbox on February 24, 2015, with the final concert of the tour on April 3 in West Hollywood, California at the House of Blues, Sunset Strip.
- The Take Me Tour (2017, with JOHN.k) - the tour began in San Francisco, CA at Slim's on February 16, 2017, and spanned 8 more shows, ending in Los Angeles, CA at The Roxy on March 2, 2017.

== Discography ==
=== Studio albums ===
List of studio albums, with selected chart positions
Title	Album details	Peak chart positions				Sales
Title	Album details	US	AUS	CAN	NZ	Sales
It's About Us	Released: October 7, 2014; Label: Syco, Columbia; Format: CD, digital download	8	97	11	9	US: 86,000
"—" denotes releases that did not chart or were not released in that territory.

=== Extended plays ===
Title	Album details	Peak chart positions	
Title	Album details	US	DEN
As Seen on TV	Release date: September 30, 2016; Label: The A&S Partnership; Formats: CD, digital download	183	36

=== Singles ===
Title	Year	Peak chart positions				Certifications	Album
Title	Year	US Bub.	US Adult	AUS	DEN	Certifications	Album
"Scarecrow"	2014	17	40	89	—		It's About Us
"Little Do You Know"	2014	—	—	—	33	RIAA: 2× Platinum	It's About Us

=== Promotional singles ===
List of promotional singles, with selected chart positions, showing year released and album name
Title	Year	Peak chart positions		Album
Title	Year	US	CAN	Album
"Just Kids"	2014	—	—	It's About Us
"Bumper Cars"	2014	—	—	It's About Us
"Here We Go"	2014	—	100	It's About Us

== Videography ==
=== Music videos ===
Year	Title	Director
2014	"Scarecrow"	Alex Purifoy (Lyric Video); Philip Andelman (Music Video)
2014	"Little Do You Know"	Jay Martin
2016	"Toxic"	
2016	"Animals"	Bruce Bohman

Preceded by Tate Stevens	Winner of The X Factor; 2013	Succeeded by N/A
