= 5 Seconds of Summer =

Australian pop rock band

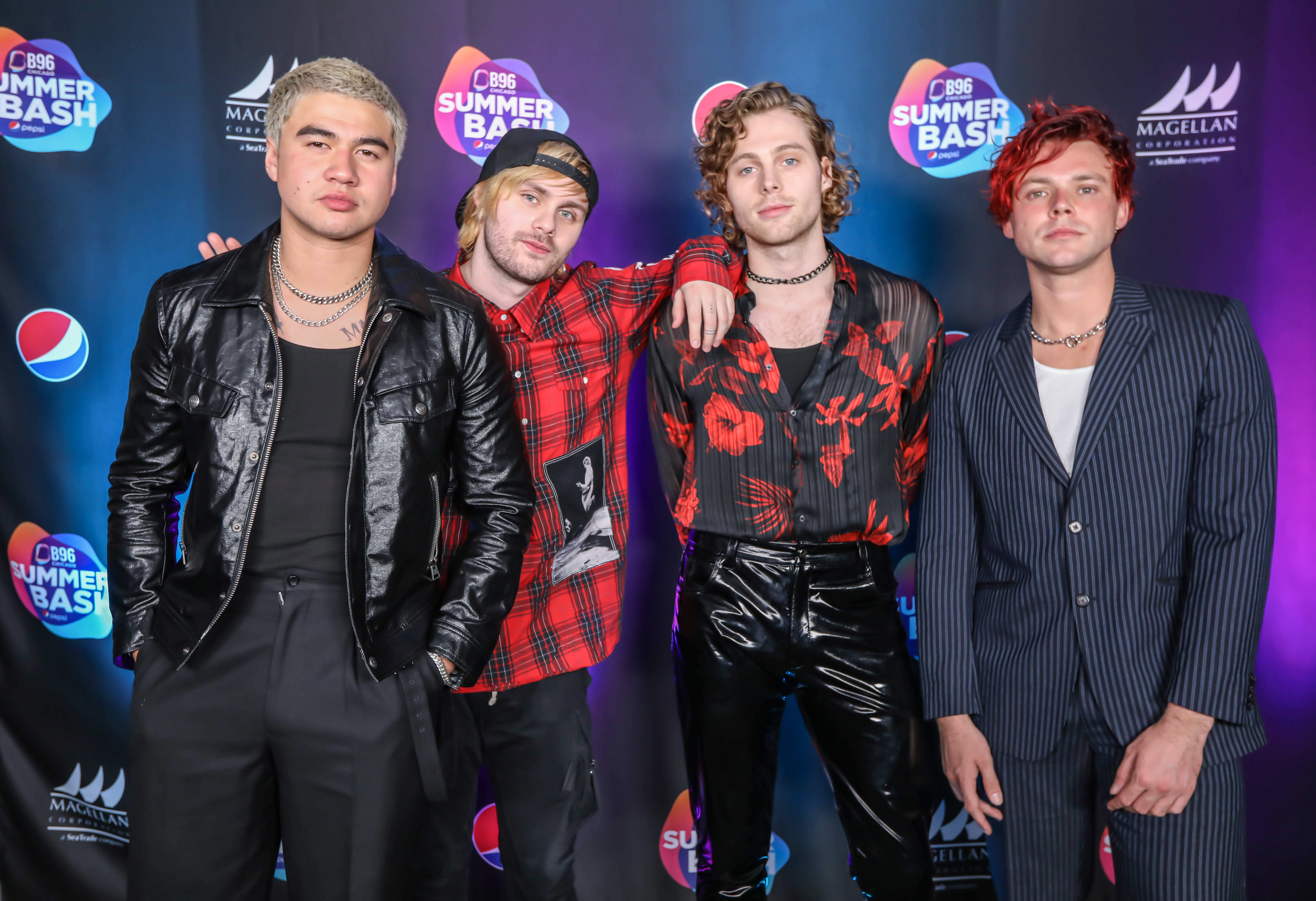
- 5 Seconds of Summer at B96 Pepsi SummerBash 2019. From left to right: Calum Hood, Michael Clifford, Luke Hemmings, and Ashton Irwin.

Background information
- Also known as: 5SOS
- Origin: Sydney, New South Wales, Australia
- Genres: Pop; pop rock; pop-punk; power pop; new wave
- Years active: 2011–present
- Labels: BMG; Capitol; Hi or Hey; Interscope; Republic
- Members: Michael Clifford; Luke Hemmings; Calum Hood; Ashton Irwin
- Website: 5sos.com

5 Seconds of Summer, often shortened to 5SOS (pronounced "five sauce"), are an Australian pop rock band formed in Sydney in 2011. The group consists of lead vocalist and rhythm guitarist Luke Hemmings, lead guitarist Michael Clifford, bassist Calum Hood, and drummer Ashton Irwin. Originally beginning their career as YouTube celebrities, they rose to international fame while touring with English-Irish boy band One Direction on their Take Me Home Tour. Since 2014, 5 Seconds of Summer have sold more than 10 million albums, sold over 2 million concert tickets worldwide, and have attained more than 7 billion streams of their songs on music streaming services, making them one of the most successful Australian musical acts in history.

In early 2014, the band released "She Looks So Perfect" which topped the charts in four countries. Their self-titled debut album was released in 2014, peaking at number one in 11 countries. The band released their second album Sounds Good Feels Good in 2015, topping the charts in 8 countries. The band's third album Youngblood, released in 2018, was yet another commercial success and became their third number one album in their home country. In the US, 5 Seconds of Summer became the first Australian act to achieve three number one albums on the Billboard 200 album chart. They also became the first band (not vocal group) to have their first three full-length albums debut at the top in the US. The album's single, "Youngblood" is the fourth highest selling Australian single of the 2010s decade and is the eleventh best-selling single in Australian history, selling over five million adjusted copies worldwide within the first six months of its release. With the release of "Youngblood", 5 Seconds of Summer became the first Australian act in 13 years to top the ARIA year-end chart and remain the second longest stint at number one in ARIA chart history. In 2020, the band released their fourth studio album Calm. The album was a commercial success, receiving positive reviews from critics, charting in more than 25 countries on multiple charts, peaking in the 10 top on 17 charts and debuting atop the charts in 4 countries. With Calm earning the band their fourth consecutive number one in their home country, 5 Seconds of Summer became the second Australian band in history to have their first four full-length studio albums debut at number one on the ARIA albums chart.

All singles from the band's four studio albums have charted in multiple countries, received multiple official sale certifications, and have been featured in numerous weekly and year-end charts, as well as making appearances on decade-end charts. The band has received numerous accolades and awards, including being honored with the prestigious APRA Outstanding International Achievement Award in 2019, being placed on Billboard's Top Artists of the 2010s chart, which lists the most popular and successful artists of the 2010–2019 decade and being credited in the exclusive APRA AMCOS 1,000,000,000 List in 2020. As of mid-2020, the band's estimated net worth is approximately US$81 million.

== History ==
=== 2011–2014: Origin and debut ===
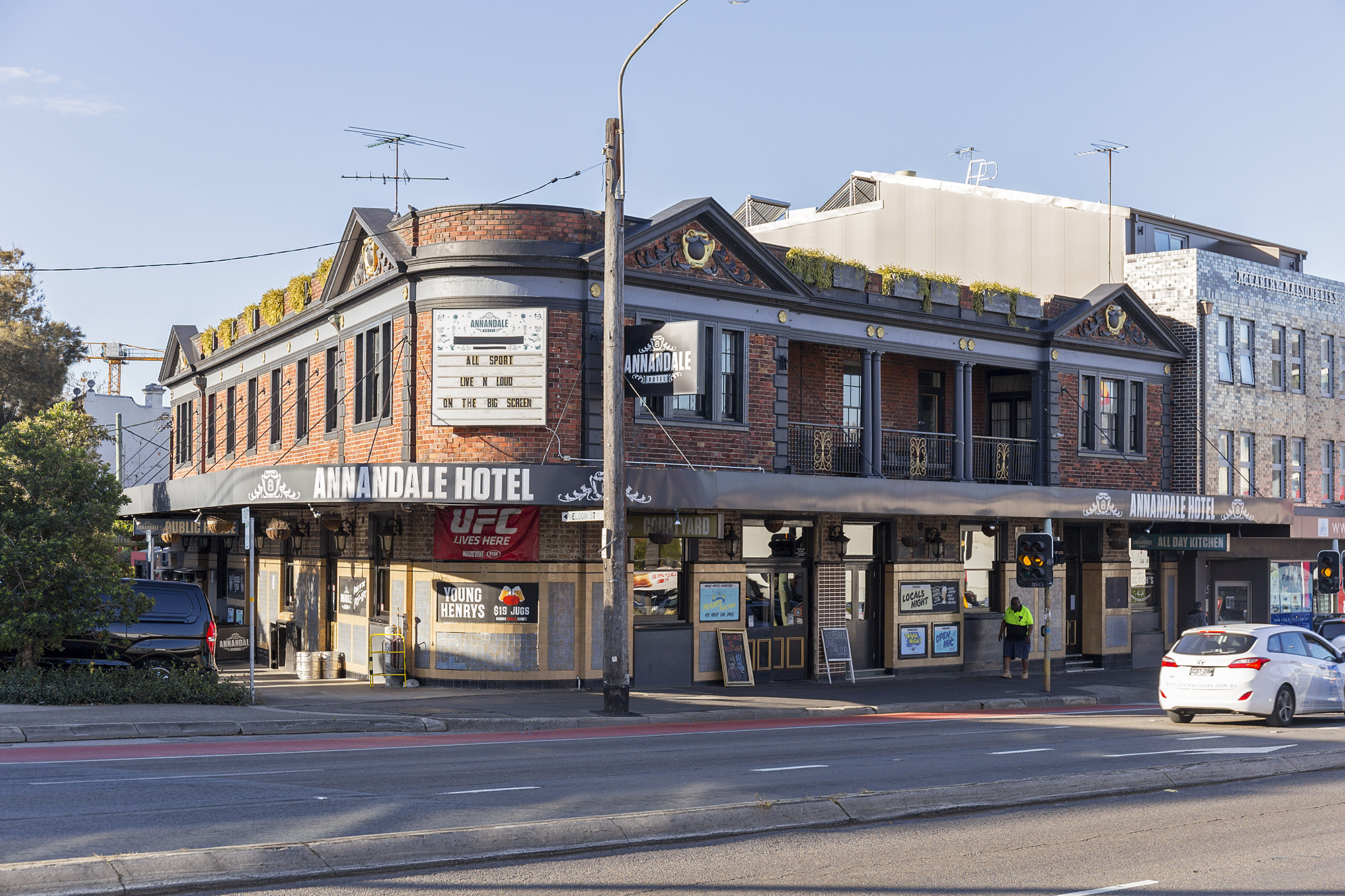
5 Seconds of Summer played their first gig at the Annandale Hotel in December 2011.

5 Seconds of Summer formed in late 2011 when Luke Hemmings, Michael Clifford, and Calum Hood, who all attended the same high-school, Norwest Christian College, began posting videos of themselves performing covers of popular songs together on Hemmings' YouTube channel. In December 2011, the trio invited drummer Ashton Irwin, and the four-man lineup was completed. The band's name was created by Clifford. Hood said the name was arbitrary, not created with any deep meaning intended. On 3 December 2011, the band played their first show at Sydney pub, Annandale Hotel, reportedly playing for only 12 people. In 2020, the band paid homage to their first performance in their "Old Me" music video, which featured a video clip of their Annandale Hotel performance and a recreation of the show.

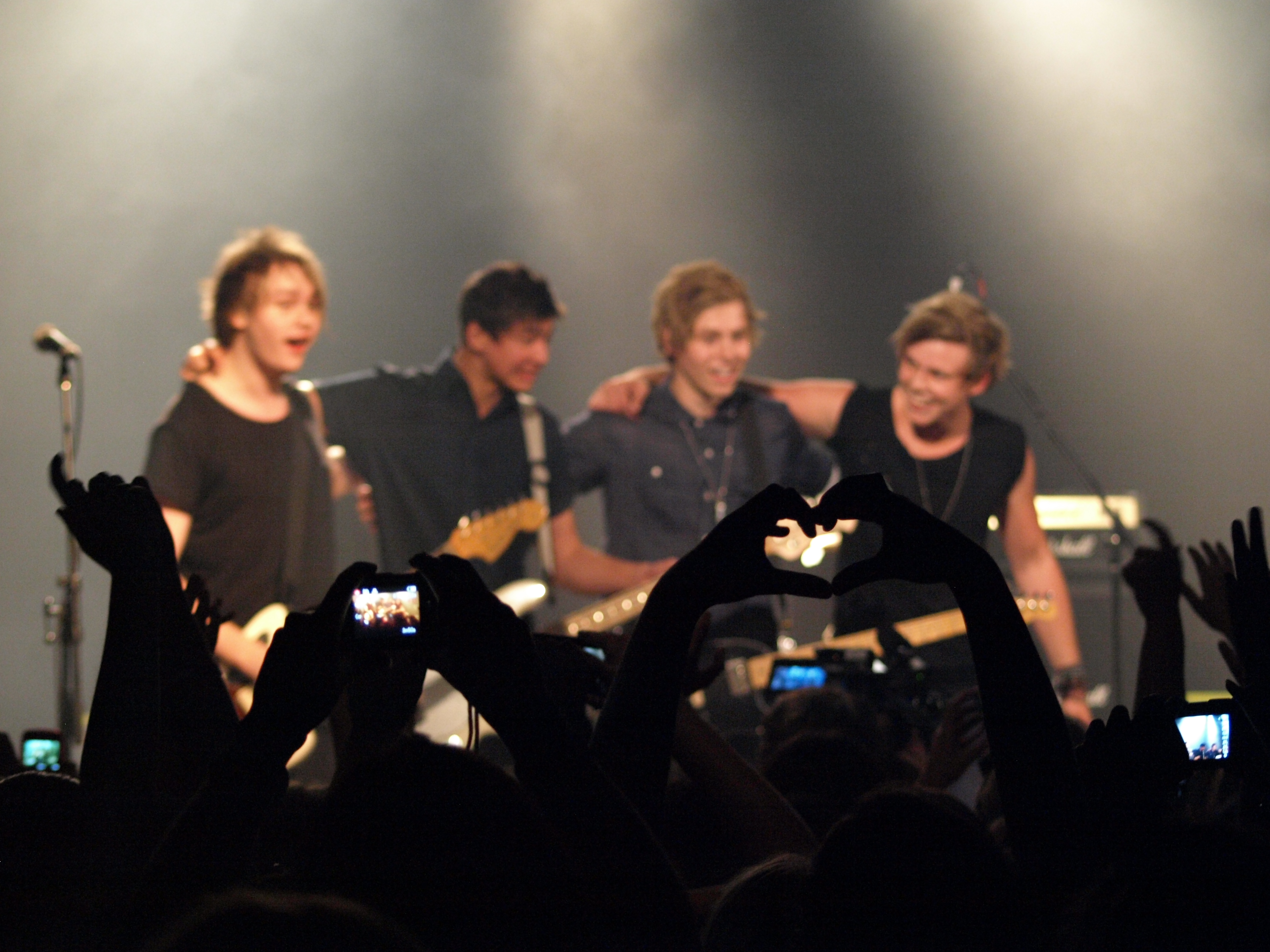
5 Seconds of Summer at their EP launch gig at The Metro Theatre on 25 November 2012

The band attracted interest from major music labels and publishers and signed a publishing deal with Sony/ATV Music Publishing. Despite having no promotion apart from on Facebook and Twitter, their first music release, an EP titled Unplugged, reached number 3 on the iTunes chart in Australia and the Top 20 in both New Zealand and Sweden. 5 Seconds of Summer spent the second half of 2012 writing and developing their sound with Christian Lo Russo and Joel Chapman of Australian band Amy Meredith, with whom they wrote two songs ("Beside You" and "Unpredictable") that were featured on their second EP Somewhere New. The EP was also co-produced by Chapman. The band released their first single "Out of My Limit" on 19 November 2012. The video clip received over 100,000 views within the first 24 hours. In December 2012, the band embarked on a songwriting trip to London where they wrote with various artists including McFly, Roy Stride of Scouting for Girls, Nick Hodgson of Kaiser Chiefs, Jamie Scott, Jake Gosling, Steve Robson and James Bourne of Busted.

As their fame and dedication to the band grew, the band members eventually dropped out of school, with Clifford having left school two years prior in Year 10 and later completing a year at TAFE. Hood dropped out in Year 11 in 2012 due to the band's move to London. Irwin had already graduated from Richmond High School in 2012, and studied music performance at a TAFE college, before choosing to leave to pursue the band. Hemmings continued with distance education up until 2013, dropping out in the final year of secondary schooling: year 12, due to the commitment of the band.

On 14 February 2013, it was announced that 5 Seconds of Summer would support One Direction on their worldwide Take Me Home Tour. The tour kicked off at the O2 Arena in London on 23 February 2013, and 5 Seconds of Summer joined One Direction for shows in the UK, US, Australia and New Zealand, including seven shows at Allphones Arena in 5 Seconds of Summer's home town of Sydney. While on a break from the Take Me Home Tour, 5 Seconds of Summer returned home to Australia where they played a national headlining tour, with all dates selling out within minutes. It was around this time when the band began to gain popularity and become more well-known. On 21 November 2013, the band announced that they had signed to Capitol Records. On 5 February 2014, 5 Seconds of Summer listed their debut major label single "She Looks So Perfect" for pre-order on the iTunes Store. On 5 March 2014, it was announced that 5 Seconds of Summer would join One Direction again, supporting them on their Where We Are Tour in the US, Canada, UK and Europe.

=== 2014: 5 Seconds of Summer and LIVESOS ===
In late March 2014, the band's single "She Looks So Perfect" was released in UK. Despite spending only one day on top in the British iTunes store and ending its week in the lower end of the top 10, 5 Seconds of Summer became the fourth Australian band to have a UK number-one single, and the first to do so in 14 years. On 9 April 2014, their third EP She Looks So Perfect debuted at number 2 on the Billboard 200 Chart. On 9 May 2014, they released their second single, "Don't Stop". It peaked at number one in 4 countries, debuted at number two on the UK Singles Chart and was in the top 10 of 8 countries overall. Billboard said that, "In the vein of Green Day's "She" and Blink-182's "All The Small Things", "Don't Stop" is 5SOS' bid for a deceptively charming pop-punk anthem, with lyrics that are stickily sweet in their awkward flirtatiousness. The bridge could be more polished, but that hook is a highlight of the whole album." On 15 June 2014, the band released their fourth EP Don't Stop which was unavailable for purchase in the US, Canada and Mexico.

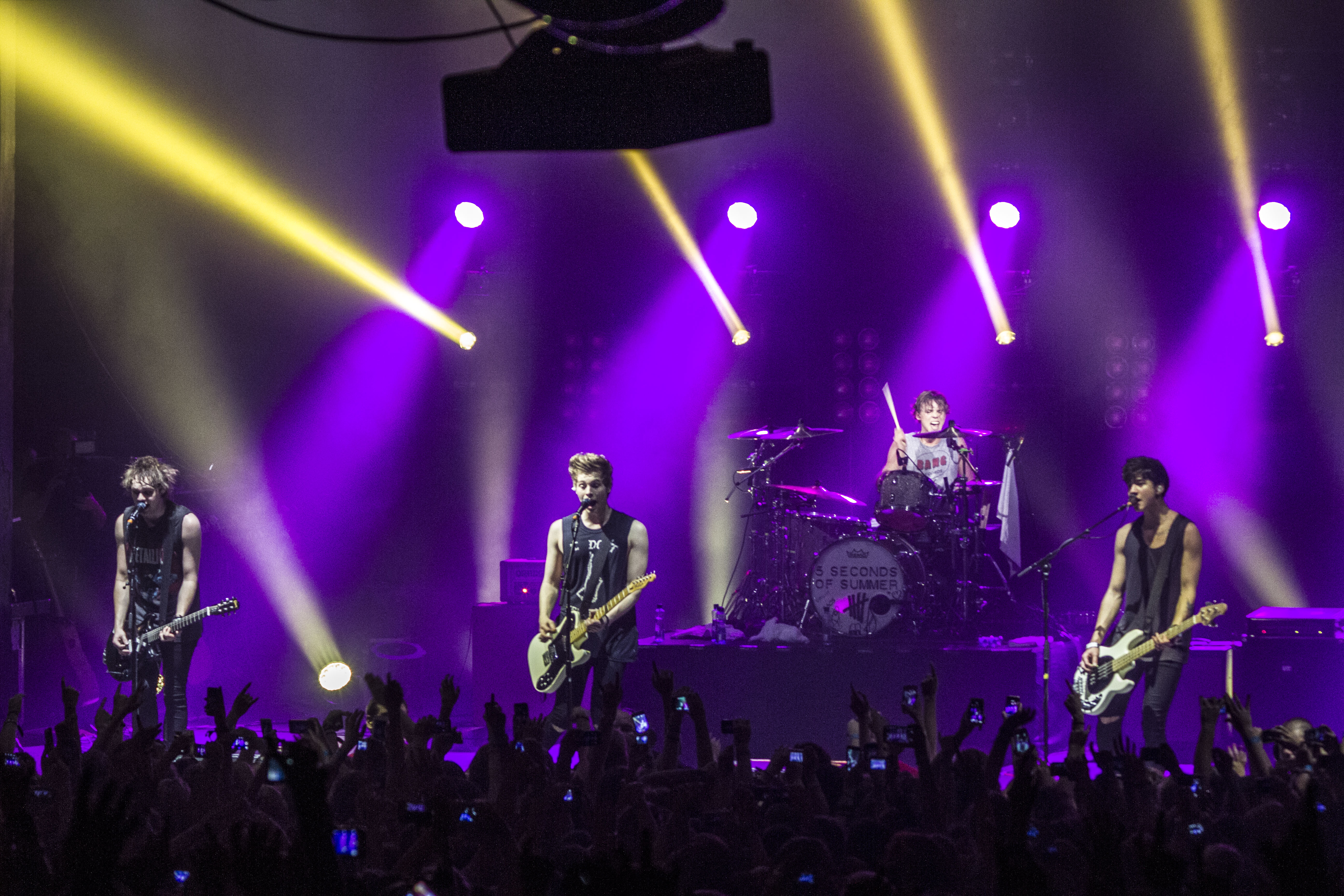
5 Seconds of Summer performing at the Enmore Theatre in Sydney, Australia on 30 April 2014

On 13 May 2014, the band announced that their debut self-titled album would be released on 27 June 2014 in Europe and Australia. The album debuted on the top of the Billboard 200 Chart, peaked at number one in 13 countries, and peaked in the Top 10 of 26 countries. On 15 July 2014, the band released their third single, "Amnesia". Billboard described the track as "a surprisingly affecting vocal performance and the most searing lyrics on the album. [...] Taking older listeners back to the relative heartache of dissolving high school romance." Billboard further stated that "'Amnesia' demonstrates the versatility of 5SOS, and one wonders why it's buried at the end of the group's debut album." On 5 September 2014, the band released their fifth EP Amnesia which was not available in US and Mexico. On 12 October 2014, the band released their fourth single, "Good Girls", and the music video logged over two million views within 48 hours. On 16 November 2014, they released their sixth EP Good Girls which topped the UK iTunes Chart. The band released a cover song "What I Like About You" by American rock band The Romantics as the first single from their live album LIVESOS. The band released their first live album, LIVESOS, on 15 December 2014.

=== 2015–2016: Sounds Good Feels Good ===
In May 2015, the band embarked on their first headlining world tour, the Rock Out With Your Socks Out Tour, taking place across arenas in Europe, Australia, New Zealand and North America.

On 17 July 2015, the band released "She's Kinda Hot" as the first single from their second studio album. On 12 August, they announced that their second studio album was titled Sounds Good Feels Good. On 28 August, they released their seventh EP, She's Kinda Hot, in the UK and Ireland only. On 9 October, they released "Hey Everybody!" as the second single and announced their Sounds Live Feels Live World Tour. Sounds Good Feels Good was released worldwide on 23 October 2015. It became the band's second number one in their home country and the first in the United Kingdom. In the United States, 5 Seconds of Summer became the first band (not vocal) to have their first two full-length albums debut at the top of the charts. The band released their third single "Jet Black Heart" on 17 December 2015, together with a music video which featured some of their fans. In 2016, the band embarked on their Sounds Live Feels Live World Tour which included sold-out stadiums and arenas across North America, Europe, Australia, and Asia.

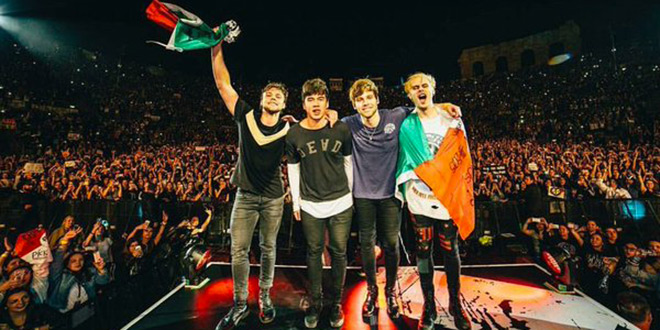
5 Seconds of Summer performing in Verona, Italy, during their 2016 headlining tour Sounds Live Feels Live

On 3 June 2016, the band announced their single "Girls Talk Boys". The song was included on the Ghostbusters (Original Motion Picture Soundtrack) and was released on 15 July. On 2 December 2016, the band announced the release of their B-sides and rarities, titled This Is Everything We Ever Said, to celebrate their fifth anniversary as a band.

After years of intense touring and the completion of the successful Sounds Live Feels Live World Tour in October 2016, the band announced that "2016 for 5SOS [had] ended," and that they would be taking the remainder of the year to rest and develop the sound for their next studio album. The break lasted nearly two years, with Hood later stating "After six years of being on the road, we needed to get our heads right for the longevity of the band." Hemmings later revealed that the band had briefly considered breaking up due to their intense schedules, stating: "'Seven years as a band may seem like a long time, but we were teenagers when we started." He further went on to say: "We had to look at each other and say 'are we going to stop now, or do this forever? Because if we continue, then we have to go further than we ever have before.'" Ultimately the band chose to continue to release new music and explore new musical directions.

=== 2017–2018: Youngblood ===
On 13 January 2017, the band was featured on Japanese rock band One Ok Rock's song, "Take What You Want". On 11 May 2017, the band announced they would be playing at several music festivals across Asia, Europe, and South America from August to September 2017, including Brazil's Rock in Rio. The band spent the remainder of the year creating their third studio album with Alexandra Tamposi, Andrew Wotman, Rivers Cuomo, Andrew Goldstein, and various others. In a Billboard interview, Irwin stated that outside of working on the album, the band spent time "redefining who [they were] as adult men" after years of intense touring.

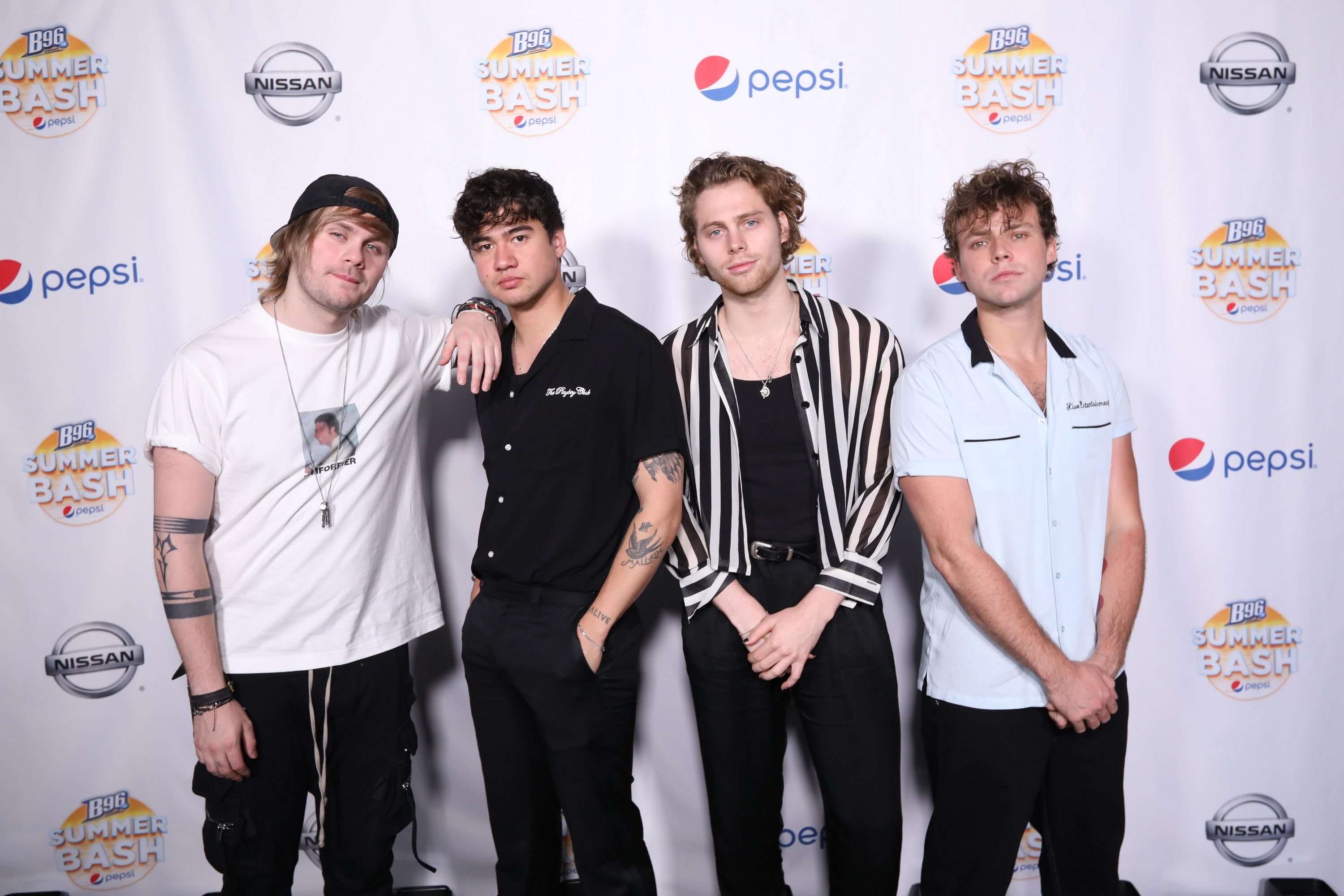
5 Seconds of Summer at B96 Summerbash in 2018

On 22 February 2018, the band released the single "Want You Back" which reached several charts in over 15 countries and peaked in the top 40 on thirteen charts, including the US, the UK, Ireland, and Australia. Following the release of "Want You Back", the band announced they would be embarking on a 2018 promotional tour entitled 5SOS III. The tour sold out within approximately three minutes with the critics praising it as "a nice teaser for what [would] be a much larger-scale fall tour." The tour began on 20 March 2018 and ended on 6 June with the band performing at intimate venues across Europe, US, Singapore, Australia, Mexico, and Brazil. Besides the tour, the group performed at music festivals, had acoustic sessions at radio stations, and made TV show appearances to promote the upcoming album. On 9 April 2018, the band announced that their third studio album, Youngblood, would be released on 22 June 2018. The band announced the dates for their fourth headlining world tour, the Meet You There World Tour, which took place across Japan, New Zealand, Australia, Canada, United States, and Europe.

On 22 May 2018, the album's title track was released as the second single. "Youngblood" achieved massive worldwide success, and peaked at number one in Australia in May 2018 and stayed on top of the ARIA Chart for eight consecutive weeks. It also stayed at number one on Official New Zealand Music Chart for four consecutive weeks, peaked at number 4 on the UK Singles Chart, and became the band's first single to reach Canada's Top 5 and the US Billboard Hot 100's top 10. In the radio format, it became the band's first single to peak at number one in the US's Pop Songs chart and Adult Pop Songs chart, and Canada's Contemporary Hit Radio chart. The song peaked at number one on US top 40 radio, making 5 Seconds of Summer the first Australian band to top the chart in 21 years. As of 2020, "Youngblood" is certified 11× platinum in Australia, 4× platinum in Poland, 3× platinum in New Zealand, 2× platinum in the US, the UK, Norway, Denmark and Sweden and platinum in Canada, Belgium, and Italy. On 1 June 2018, the band announced that the release date of the album was moved forward to 15 June 2018. Youngblood was a commercial success and debuted at number one in Australia and the US Billboard 200, becoming their third consecutive number one album in both countries. It debuted in the top 3 in the UK and seven other countries. Overall, the album reached the top 10 of 20 countries.

The band performed their lead single "Want You Back" on The Tonight Show Starring Jimmy Fallon on 11 April 2018 and on The Voice (U.S. season 14) on 8 May 2018. On 25 May, the group performed for selected fans for a Spotify Fans First Event in Sydney, Australia. The band performed their second single "Youngblood" on The Voice Australia and on BBC Radio 1's Live Lounge on 12 June 2018. In June 2018, Apple Music released "On the Record: 5 Seconds of Summer – Youngblood", a documentary detailing the band's two-year break and return. To celebrate the release of the documentary, the band held a one-night sold-out show in New York. On 22 June 2018, the band performed on The Today Show's Summer Concert Series. On 25 June 2018, Tumblr organized an intimate sold-out show in New York City, as part of its Tumblr IRL event series, where the band performed for their fans whilst they celebrated their album debuting number one in the US. In August 2018, the band released a Spotify-exclusive version of their track "Lie to Me", along with a cover of Post Malone's song "Stay". In October 2018, the band was featured in an episode of Billboard's Pop Shop podcast, talking about the making of their single "Youngblood", and their upcoming third single "Valentine". In December, they performed at the 2018 ARIA Awards in Australia, where they won three awards. On 21 December 2018, the band released a rendition of their "Lie to Me" track which featured Julia Michaels. The accompanying music video for the track was later released on 18 January 2019 and an acoustic version of the single was then released on 1 February 2019, along with the accompanying music video.

In December 2018, the band was listed on several Billboard year-end charts, including being named in the Top 10 of the "Top Artists - Duo/Group" chart. The band also made appearances on the "Top Artists", "Hot 100 Artists", and "Top Billboard 200 Artists" charts. The band's third album, Youngblood, was listed in the Top 100 of the Billboard 200 Albums and Top Canadian Albums charts. The album's single, "Youngblood", was listed in the Top 20 of the Billboard Pop Songs chart, the Top 40 of the Hot 100 Songs, Radio Songs, Adult Pop Songs, Dance/Mix Show Airplay Songs, and Digital Song Sales, as well as making an appearance on the Canadian Hot 100 charts, the Top 100 of the Streaming Songs and On-demand Songs charts. "Youngblood" was the top selling single in 2018 in Australia and the Youngblood album was the most-streamed Australian album of 2018. In the 2018 Guinness World Records, 5 Seconds of Summer were named as the most popular group on Snapchat. "Youngblood" peaked in more than 15 other year-end charts in 2018, was officially certified Australia's 2018 song of the year and won the ARIA Award for Song of the Year. 5 Seconds of Summer became the first homegrown act in 13 years to top ARIA year-end tally and remain the second longest stint at number one atop the ARIA chart in history. The song was ranked at number seven in The UK's Official Top 40 Biggest Song of the Summer 2018. In 2019, "Youngblood" peaked in more than 10 year-end charts and has since received official platinum and gold notable achievement certifications in over 15 countries. As well as appearing on a multitude of weekly and year-end charts over several countries and receiving multiple certifications, "Youngblood" impacted the ARIA decade-end chart (2010–2019), which ranks the most popular songs of the decade, at number thirty-seven. "Youngblood" was the fourth highest selling Australian single of the 2010–2019 decade. In Australia, "Youngblood" is the eleventh best-selling single of all time in the country. "Youngblood" sold over five million adjusted copies within six months of its release and is the most streamed Australian song of all time on Apple Music. In February 2020, 5 Seconds of Summer were honored in the APRA AMCOS' The 1,000,000,000 List, for "Youngblood" having been streamed over 1 billion times. As of May 2020, "Youngblood" has spent over 110 consecutive weeks (over 2 years) in the Top 20 on the ARIA Australian Singles chart.

=== 2019–2022: Calm ===
On 5 February 2019, the band shared teasers for their upcoming single "Who Do You Love", a collaboration with American DJ duo The Chainsmokers. The single was released on 7 February, along with the lyric video on YouTube. The song peaked in several countries and weekly and year-end charts, including peaking at number one on the Australia Dance chart In March, the band performed the single, along with The Chainsmokers, on The Tonight Show Starring Jimmy Fallon and the official music video was released on 25 March 2019. The band later joined the duo on the North American World War Joy Tour, alongside Lennon Stella during the last quarter of 2019. The band's performance on tour was very well received by critics, who praised the band for having "captivated everyone's attention" with their "incredible energy" and for "turning the concert into their own as [...] a 5 Seconds of Summer concert with a free EDM show to follow."

On 23 May 2019, the band released "Easier" as the lead single from their upcoming fourth studio album and the first with their new label, Interscope Records. The song charted in several countries, on both weekly and year-end charts and included peaks at number twelve in Australia, number twelve in the US Mainstream Top 40 and number twenty-seven in the UK. "Easier" was nominated for the ARIA 2019 Song of the Year Award. Billboard included the song on their 100 Best Songs of 2019 list at number 79. The album's follow-up single, "Teeth", from Season 3 of the Netflix series 13 Reasons Why, was released on 21 August 2019. The song charted in several countries and included peaks at number fifteen in Australia, and number twenty-one in the US Mainstream Top 40 The song features Tom Morello of Rage Against the Machine, who provides the guitar riff in the outro of the track. In 2020, the song was nominated for the prestigious Song of the Year award at the APRA Music Awards of 2020 and won the ARIA 2020 Song of the Year Award. At the end of the decade, 5 Seconds of Summer were named on Billboard's Top Artists of the 2010s Chart, which lists the most popular and successful artists of the 2010–2019 decade.

On 5 February 2020, the band announced their fourth studio album Calm, and released "No Shame", the third single from the album, at the same time. On 16 February 2020 the band performed at Fire Fight Australia, a televised concert at ANZ Stadium in Sydney raising money for bush-fire relief. Their performance, which included the very first live performance of "No Shame", was widely praised both by critics and viewers and dubbed the "best performance" of the show, with Billboard writing "They were raised playing stadiums and as such were, perhaps surprisingly, the perfect warm-up act for Queen -- though such a term diminishes the impact they had in fifteen short minutes." On 21 February 2020, the band released "Old Me", as a promotional single from Calm, before releasing it to radio as the album's fourth single on 6 March 2020.. Although the song was given very minimal promotion, it charted in a number of countries, including a peak at number thirty-nine in Australia and number twenty-six on the US Mainstream Top 40. On 25 March 2020, the band released "Wildflower" as the fifth and final single from Calm. With song promotion halted due to the COVID-19 pandemic, the song peaked at number twelve on the Australian Artists chart.

On 27 March 2020, the band released their fourth studio album Calm. The album was a commercial success and received generally positive reviews from critics who praised the band's artistic growth and maturity. The album charted in more than 25 countries on numerous charts, and debuted atop the charts at number one in Australia, the UK and Scotland. The album peaked in the top 10 on 17 charts, including number two in Mexico and number four in Austria, Estonia, Ireland, New Zealand and Portugal. In the US, due to an alleged shipping error, approximately 15,000 copies of the album were released early, which resulted in Calm debuting a week early on the Billboard 200 chart. Had the shipping error not occurred, Calm would have debuted at number one in the US, earning the band's fourth consecutive number one in the country. Despite the shipping error, the album peaked at number two in the US, earning the band their fifth top 10 album on the Billboard 200 chart. In June, Billboard named the album as one of the Top 50 Best Albums of 2020 So Far. With Calm earning the band their fourth consecutive number one in their home country, 5 Seconds of Summer became the second Australian band in history to have their first four full-length studio albums debut at number one on the ARIA albums chart. Calm remains the best-selling cassette album of 2020 in the UK. The No Shame Tour, later renamed the Take My Hand World Tour, was originally set to begin in May 2020 in support of the album, but had to be postponed to 2022 due to the COVID-19 pandemic.

On 23 September 2020, Irwin announced the release of his debut solo album, titled Superbloom, released on 23 October 2020. He is the first member of the band to release a solo project. Irwin stated, "It brings me the greatest joy of all that I am in a band that allows me to create freely inside and outside of it".

On 13 August 2021, Hemmings released his debut solo album When Facing the Things We Turn Away From.

On 3 December 2021, in celebration of their ten-year anniversary, the band released the single "2011" as well as The 5 Seconds of Summer Show - A 10 Year Celebration, an over one-hour long YouTube video that features a mix of live performances, interviews and comedic sketches.

=== 2022–2025: 5SOS5 and solo projects ===
On 2 March 2022, the band released "Complete Mess" as the lead single from their fifth studio album. The second single, "Take My Hand", was released on 1 April 2022. On 3 April 2022 the band embarked on the postponed Take My Hand World Tour, which had originally been planned for 2020. The third single, "Me, Myself & I", was released on 11 May 2022. In May 2022, the band announced their fifth studio album, 5SOS5, which was released on 23 September 2022. The album is the band's first released independently under BMG Rights Management. The fourth single "Blender" was released on 13 July 2022 and the fifth single "Older" (featuring Sierra Deaton) was released on 7 September 2022, both of which were released with no prior announcement. On the eve of the album release, the band performed a concert entitled The Feeling of Falling Upwards at the Royal Albert Hall in London alongside a choir and orchestra. The concert was also streamed globally and subsequently available on-demand for three days. 5SOS5 charted in numerous countries, and debuted atop the album charts in Australia, the UK, Scotland, and the Netherlands, and at number two on the Billboard 200 chart. The album was praised for its lyricism, maturity, and for both paying homage to the band's previous albums as well as experimenting and taking risks.

On 30 November 2022, the band started the seven-show Australian leg of the Take My Hand tour, which ended with two concerts at the forecourt of the Sydney Opera House on 9 and 10 December 2022. The band would tour internationally throughout 2023 on a run dubbed The 5 Seconds of Summer Show, which culminated with a performance at When We Were Young Festival in Las Vegas that October. That April also saw the release of The Feeling of Falling Upwards as the band's third live album.

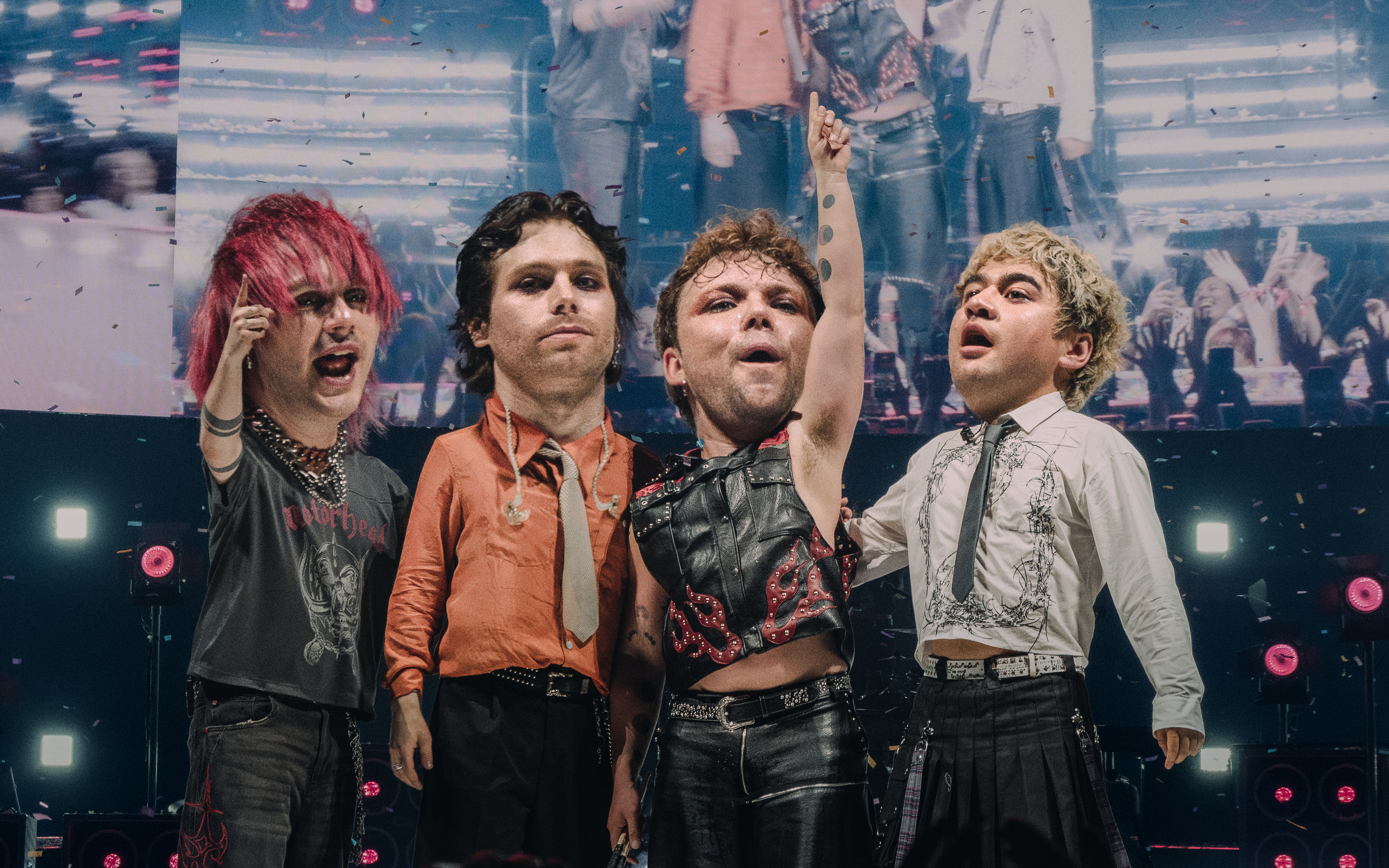
5 Seconds of Summer performing in at The O2 Arena in 2026

On 1 March 2024 the band released the single "Lighter", which saw them collaborating with European dance music producers Galantis and David Guetta. One month later, in April, Hemmings release his second solo project, the EP Boy, and would embark on a tour for it later in the year. In July, Irwin would also release his second solo album, entitled Blood on the Drums. Both Hood and Clifford would follow suit in 2025 by releasing their debut solo albums – Order Chaos Order and Sidequest, respectively – within six weeks of one another. Hood's album reached number one on the ARIA Albums Chart upon its release in June 2025, marking the second member of the band to do so with a solo record after Hemmings achieved the same accomplishment in 2021 with When Facing the Things We Turn Away From.

=== 2025–present: Everyone's a Star! ===
On 24 September 2025, the band released the single "Not OK" as the lead single from their sixth studio album, Everyone's a Star!, later released on 14 November 2025. A music video for the song was released later on 9 October. The second single, "Boyband", was released on 16 October 2025. The third single, "Telephone Busy", was released on 23 October 2025. On the same day, the band announced the Everyone's a Star! World Tour, which began on 26 March 2026 and is set to conclude on 6 December 2026.

== Band members ==
- Luke Hemmings – lead vocals, rhythm guitar, keyboards
- Michael Clifford – lead guitar, keyboards, backing and occasional lead vocals
- Calum Hood – bass guitar, keyboards, backing and occasional lead vocals
- Ashton Irwin – drums, percussion, keyboards, backing and occasional lead vocals

== Artistry and band status ==
=== Musical style ===
5 Seconds of Summer have experimented with several musical and artistry styles through each of their albums and throughout the span of their career. The band has expressed that they do not want to be confined to a single genre, stating in a 2019 GQ interview:

It doesn't really matter what genre [our music] fits in, if it's fitting in an area that works for people who connect to it than that's all that matters.

5 Seconds of Summer's musical style has been described as pop, pop rock, pop-punk, power pop, and new wave. In 2015, Rolling Stone magazine called them "emo-gone-pop" and John Feldmann of Goldfinger stated that, "[5 Seconds of Summer] is the best pop-punk band I've ever heard". In 2017, Matt Collar of AllMusic described the band as having a reminiscent of "'90s punk-pop" and "2000s boy band pop" in their sound. Through the release of Youngblood and Calm, the band has evolved from their pop-punk roots to explore musical depth within pop, new wave, rock and pop rock. The band's quintessential developing sound has now been described as "classic pop-rock sentiments setting up the layering for the catchy hook."

For their first studio album the band heavily cited Sum 41, Blink-182, Green Day, All Time Low, Good Charlotte, Nirvana, Mayday Parade, Busted, McFly, A Day to Remember, Boys Like Girls, and My Chemical Romance as their influences In one of their first interviews as a band, 5 Seconds of Summer cited American rock band All Time Low as one of their biggest inspirations and dream collaboration. In 2020, it was announced that on the 5 Seconds of Summer's headlining No Shame Tour, All Time Low would be the opening act for the European leg of the tour.

For their second album, Sounds Good Feels Good, they cited All Time Low, the Used, Yellowcard, State Champs, Good Charlotte, INXS, Sugarcult, Green Day, and Mayday Parade as influences.

5 Seconds of Summer has been labelled a boy band by the media, largely due to their past affiliation with English-Irish boy band One Direction and previously having a mostly female audience. Members of the group have long rebutted claims that they are a boy band, with Irwin, in the past, comparing the band's fanbase to Fall Out Boy, who also boast a large female fanbase. John Feldmann, frontman of Goldfinger, attributed 5 Seconds of Summer's fanbase to "a fundamental change in the pop punk demo[graphic]", mentioning its gradual shift away from the majorly-male audiences of early 1990s pop punk acts, such as Blink-182 and Green Day. Hemmings previously described the band as being a pop rock band with a boyband fanbase. In a 2018 interview with Vice, in response to a question about the band's thoughts on being mistakenly referred to as a boy band, Irwin responded:

Some of the bands we look up to have been amazing vocalists but I think the term boyband embodies youth. And when we're not a youthful band anymore, that's when we'll have problems. Labels are for people who are scared of themselves, and we're not.

The band's third studio album, Youngblood, cited inspiration from the likes of Gorillaz, the Beatles, and Queen. Hemmings described the title track single of the album as the lifestyle the band were living at the time of writing the song and further referred to the Youngblood 'persona' as dynamic waves of "give and take". The distinct musical differences from their previous albums to Youngblood was credited to the band's desire to move out of their sonic comfort zone of pop punk. Clifford later stated that in order for the band to feel satisfied as artists, they had to push themselves "to make something new" and that the unpredictability that resulted was "the best thing" for the band.

For their fourth studio album, Calm, the band stated that there was an intentionally "darker sound" and that they were "inspired by dark, synth-heavy groups of the eighties and nineties" including Depeche Mode, Tears for Fears, and Nine Inch Nails' song "Closer". They also stated that the direction of the album had been influenced by their listening to Gesaffelstein, Health, St. Vincent, Disclosure and Bob Moses. The band's lead single for their fourth album "Easier" was inspired by Nine Inch Nails' song "Closer" with the band citing inspiration to the "derivative of the driving drum groove". The second single off the fourth album, "Teeth" featured Tom Morello of Rage Against the Machine, who provided a guitar riff solo on the outro of the track.

On the band's diverse and ever-changing musical style change, Hemmings has stated:

I think all artists change their sound because they're not satisfied in the art they're making. We started out, very angsty, trying to get out of the hometown, and people called us a boy band, but we played pop punk music, it was written like that. As you get older, your music taste becomes more diverse and you get a bit smarter about it. You just bring in those kind of elements and you want to remain happy in what you're making.

=== Net worth ===
5 Seconds of Summer have established two known and confirmed companies, both London-based. The initial 5 SECONDS OF SUMMER LLP was created in January 2013, followed by the 5SOS LLP which was established in June 2014. The band also has multiple known Australian touring and business companies.

The secondary company, 5SOS LLP was established in association with company ONE MODE PRODUCTIONS LLP, with One Direction members, Liam Payne and Louis Tomlinson, signed as directors to the latter. In late 2014, Billboard Magazine revealed that all five One Direction members: Niall Horan, Harry Styles, Liam Payne, Zayn Malik and Louis Tomlinson, collectively held a 20% stake in the 5SOS LLP. It was also reported that the 20% stakes were further split evenly between the members of One Direction and London-based Modest Management, with 5 Seconds of Summer owning the remainder 80% of the company's shares. It was estimated that within the span of three months, the members of One Direction had earned $25,000 each, based on 5 Seconds of Summer's music sales alone.

In January 2015, it was revealed that both Payne and Tomlinson had resigned as directors of One Mode Production.

Despite 5 Seconds of Summer being in a period of inactivity for the majority of 2017, both of the band's companies continued to significantly increase in worth. In September 2018, it was reported that the 5 Seconds of Summer's networth increased by 193.23% within the span of a year.

The band's two British companies do not factor in the monetary amounts earned from their global ventures and other companies. Both LLP accounts' information are made available through the British government page, Companies House. As of mid-2020, the band's estimated net worth is approximately $81 million (USD).

== Hi or Hey Records and departure from Capitol Records ==
Hi or Hey Records
- Parent company: Capitol Records
- Founded: 27 January 2014
- Founder: Luke Hemmings, Calum Hood, Michael Clifford, Ashton Irwin
- Distributor: Universal Music Group

On 27 January 2014, the band announced that they would be setting up their own record label, Hi or Hey Records. The record label's name was chosen via a fan voting system on Twitter. On the label's website, the band stated that aside from releasing all of their music through Hi or Hey Records in conjunction with Capitol Records, they would also be signing bands via the label. On 24 March 2015, the label signed pop rock band Hey Violet.

5 Seconds of Summer's first three studio albums: 5 Seconds of Summer (2014), Sounds Good Feels Good (2015), and Youngblood (2018) were all released through the Hi or Hey Records imprint.

In May 2019, it was announced that 5 Seconds of Summer had departed from Hi or Hey Records/Capitol Records and signed with Interscope Records for their fourth studio album Calm. Their fifth studio album, 5SOS5, was released independently via BMG Rights Management on 23 September 2022.

As of 2020, Hi or Hey Records remains active as all of Hey Violet's recordings are released via Hi or Hey Records in conjunction with Capitol.

== Philanthropy and supported causes ==
In October 2018, prior to the scheduled premiere of Queen's biopic Bohemian Rhapsody, 5 Seconds of Summer released a cover of the Queen song "Killer Queen". All proceeds from the cover were presented to the Mercury Phoenix Trust, an organization founded by Queen's band members aiming to provide support against HIV/AIDS. In response, Queen's manager, Jim Beach, expressed his gratitude and excitement towards the band for supporting the cause.

In December 2018, the band appeared on 24 Hours of Reality: Protect Our Planet, Protect Ourselves, a two-day web-telecast organized by The Climate Reality Project, an organization led by former US Vice President Al Gore, to help raise awareness about the effects of climate change.

In a June 2019, 5 Seconds of Summer starred in a season 6 episode of Celebrity Family Feud, a televised game show in which celebrity teams compete against each other for a $50,000 top prize to be donated to the charity of the winning team's choice. The band competed against The Chainsmokers for the Make-A-Wish Foundation, an organization granting the wishes of children with life-threatening illnesses.

In February 2020, the band performed at Fire Fight Australia, a televised fundraising concert for Australian Bush-fire Relief held at the ANZ Stadium. The concert grossed a total of $9.85 million (AUD). The band's performance was widely praised both by critics and viewers and dubbed the "best performance" of the show, with Billboard writing "They were raised playing stadiums and as such were, perhaps surprisingly, the perfect warm-up act for Queen -- though such a term diminishes the impact they had in fifteen minutes". In March 2020, a compilation album titled Artists Unite for Fire Fight was released, consisting of performances from the concert. The album includes 5 Seconds of Summer's live performance of "Youngblood".

For the release of their fourth studio album Calm in March 2020 during the COVID-19 pandemic, the band released several limited edition vinyls, CDs and merchandise bundles with a portion from every US purchase being donated to the PLUS1 COVID-19 Relief Fund, and a portion from all UK purchases being donated to the NHS charity initiative, COVID-19 Urgent Appeal. In April 2020, 5 Seconds of Summer collaborated with Universal Music Group on their We've Got You Covered campaign, which featured popular and influential artists' logos on reusable face masks available for purchase, with 100% of net proceeds donated to MusiCares and its COVID-19 relief program. The initiative also delivered 50,000 masks to front-line workers, free of charge. On 23 April 2020, 5 Seconds of Summer were featured as the vocals and acoustic guitar in BBC Radio 1's "biggest ever" Live Lounge "Times Like These" cover version as part of their Stay at Home project during the COVID-19 pandemic. Among various charities worldwide, profits from the single were primarily donated to Children in Need and Comic Relief. The song charted number one in the UK on its second week, earning 66,000 chart sales.

In May 2020, 5 Seconds of Summer partnered with The Big Band Bus Raffle campaign, a sweepstakes created to provide aid to NHS frontline staff during the COVID-19 pandemic. The band donated four concert tickets and a pre-show soundcheck experience to the raffle. On 21 May 2020, 5 Seconds of Summer took part in the NBC "Sixth Annual Red Nose Day Special", designed to raise money and awareness for children in need. The funds raised through the campaign were directed to help mitigate the effect of the COVID-19 pandemic on children and donated to youth aid organizations. The band served as the final act and were praised by viewers for the performance of their Calm album track, "Best Years".

In reaction to Russia's invasion of Ukraine on 24 February 2022, the band participated in Global Citizen's "Stand Up for Ukraine" campaign. On 26 September 2022 the band released a music video for the song "Bad Omens" created entirely by a crew of Ukrainians, sharing that "This was the very first international commercial/video shoot in Ukraine since the war began so we want to thank Alyona, Mitri, and all the people involved in Ukraine who made this video possible."

=== Friends of Friends ===
On 13 May 2019, the band announced the creation of their philanthropic brand, Friends of Friends, with the release of a limited-edition clothing collection. All profits from the first initiative were donated to Safe Place for Youth, a project that focuses on helping and empowering homeless youth in Los Angeles. On 21 May 2019, the band announced they would be hosting their first benefit concert under the Friends of Friends name. On 29 May 2019, the first-ever Friends of Friends show was held in a sold-out venue in Venice, California, with 5 Seconds of Summer as featured headliners and All Time Low, Sierra Deaton, among various other artists as supporting acts. All proceeds from the event were donated to the Safe Place for Youth project.

On 26 June 2019, Friends of Friends released another limited edition clothing range with the announcement of their second benefit concert. This time taking place in Sydney, Australia on 3 July 2019, the sold-out concert featured 5 Seconds of Summer as headliners, with Amy Shark, Genesis Owusu, and several other artists as support acts. All proceeds from the show and the clothing range were donated to Blacktown Youth Services Association, an Australian organization that works to inspire young people to positively impact their community.

On 23 January 2020, in response to the 2019-20 Australian bushfires, the band stated that they were "devastated by the tragic fires that [had] affected so many [...] in Australia," and wanted "to contribute as best [they could] to relief efforts". The band later announced the release of a limited-edition clothing range designed by artist, Micah Ulrich. All proceeds from the clothing collection were donated to the Australian Red Cross.

On 27 July 2020, amid the George Floyd Protests, the band collaborated with Haitian-American transgender artist Sanyu Nicolas to release a charitable clothing collection with all proceeds being donated to The Marsha P. Johnson Institute. Along with the launch of the clothing collection the band stated that they "stand with the Black transgender community in their fight for equality, recognition, and justice". The band also added additional resources to the Friends of Friends website and the brand's official newsletter, which detailed the Black Lives Matter Movement and LGBT Movement with petitions related to the movements.

For the 2020 American presidential election, Friends of Friends released a clothing collection, accompanied by an appeal urging people to vote, stating, "You've been given the privilege to use your voice; now it is your job to show up to the polls." All proceeds from the collection were donated to Vote Save America, to "benefit [their] efforts to ensure fair & equal access to the polls."

Following Russia's invasion of Ukraine, Friends of Friends set up a fundraiser and released a tote bag and stickers designed by Ukraine-based artist Ulyana Nesheva on 6 May 2022, with all donations and profits going to Voices of Children, an organization that "provides psychological and psychosocial support to children, helping them overcome the consequences of armed conflict and develop." The band also encouraged people to protest, contact their elected officials, and boycott companies dealing with Russia.

== Awards ==
5 Seconds of Summer have received numerous accolades and awards over the course of the band's active career including ten MTV European Music Awards, five ARIA Awards, three APRA Awards, three BMI Awards and two MTV Video Music Awards. In 2019, the band was awarded the prestigious APRA Music Awards' Outstanding International Achievement Award for their excellence and outstanding worldwide success in sales and airplay performance. In 2020, 5 Seconds of Summer were awarded and honored in the APRA AMCOS' The 1,000,000,000 List, which recognizes excellence among Australian songwriting artists who have achieved massive international success. The band was awarded for their single, "Youngblood", reaching over a billion streams. There are currently only 16 artists in history who have been awarded a position on the list.

== Discography ==
- 5 Seconds of Summer (2014)
- Sounds Good Feels Good (2015)
- Youngblood (2018)
- Calm (2020)
- 5SOS5 (2022)
- Everyone's a Star! (2025)

== Tours ==
Headlining

- Mini Australian Tour (2012)
- Twenty Twelve Tour (2012)
- Pants Down Tour (2013)
- UK Tour (2014)
- 5 Countries 5 Days European Tour (2014)
- Stars, Stripes and Maple Syrup Tour (2014)
- There's No Place Like Home Tour (2014)
- Rock Out with Your Socks Out Tour (2015)
- Sounds Live Feels Live World Tour (2016)
- Meet You There Tour (2018)
- Take My Hand World Tour (2022)
- The 5 Seconds of Summer Show (2023)
- Everyone's a Star! World Tour (2026)

Promotional

- 5SOS III Tour (2018)

Opening act

- Hot Chelle Rae – Whatever World Tour (2012)
- One Direction – Take Me Home Tour (2013)
- One Direction – Where We Are Tour (2014)
- One Direction – On the Road Again Tour (2015)
- The Chainsmokers – World War Joy Tour (2019)

== Videography ==
=== Filmography ===
Year	Title	Role	Notes	Ref.
2014	5 Seconds Of Summer: So Perfect	Themselves	Documentary film	
2014	5 Seconds of Summer: Up Close & Personal	Themselves	Documentary film	
2015	How Did We End Up Here? 5 Seconds Of Summer Live At Wembley Arena	Themselves	Documentary film filmed during the band's 3 nights consecutive sold-out tour shows at Wembley arena London.	
2018	On the Record: 5 Seconds of Summer – Youngblood	Themselves	Documentary film detailing the band's two-year break and return with the global success of Youngblood.	

=== Television ===
Year	Title	Role	Notes	Ref.
2014	Sunday Brunch	Themselves	(S3E16)	
2014	The Voice Kids Australia	Themselves	(S1E1)	
2014	Super League Show	Themselves	(S16E22)	
2014	Strictly Come Dancing	Themselves	(S12E1)	
2014	Strictly Come Dancing	Themselves	(S12E22)	
2014	The Tonight Show Starring Jimmy Fallon	Themselves	(S2E23)	
2014	Today	Themselves		
2015	Alan Carr: Chatty Man	Themselves	(S15E5)	
2015	Red Nose Day 2015	Themselves	Telethon	
2015	The Ellen DeGeneres Show	Themselves	(S13E34)	
2015	The Tonight Show Starring Jimmy Fallon	Themselves	(S3E31)	
2015	The Late Late Show with James Corden	Themselves	(S2E44)	
2015	The Best Hit USA	Themselves		
2015	Today	Themselves		
2016	Conan	Themselves	(S6E21)	
2016	The Late Late Show with James Corden	Themselves	(S2E70)	
2018	Sunday Brunch	Themselves	(S7E3)	
2018	The Voice Australia	Themselves	(S7E17)	
2018	24 Hours of Reality: Protect Our Planet, Protect Ourselves	Themselves	Television special	
2018	The Tonight Show Starring Jimmy Fallon	Themselves	(S5E119)	
2018	Zoe Ball on ...	Themselves	(S1E20)	
2018	The Best Hit USA	Themselves		
2018	Today	Themselves		
2018	Entertainment Tonight Canada	Themselves	(S13E151)	
2018	Celebrity Page	Themselves	(S3E129)	
2018	The Voice	Themselves	(S14E24)	
2019	The Voice Australia	Themselves	(S8E20)	
2019	Celebrity Family Feud	Contestants	(S6E2)	
2019	Good Mythical Morning	Themselves	(S16E12)	
2019	Welcome, First Time in Korea?	Themselves/"Friends"	(S2E69) - 5SOS Special	
2019	The Tonight Show Starring Jimmy Fallon	Themselves	(S6E113)	
2019	The Late Late Show with James Corden	Themselves	(S6E7)	
2019	iHeartRadio Wango Tango	Themselves	Television special	
2019	LADBible Extinct	Themselves		
2019	A Little Late with Lilly Singh	Themselves	(S1E3)	
2020	Sunrise	Themselves		
2020	Fire Fight Australia	Themselves	Television special	
2020	Red Nose Day 2020	Themselves	Telethon	
2020	The Tonight Show Starring Jimmy Fallon	Themselves	(S7E122)	
2020	The Late Late Show with James Corden	Themselves	(S6E98)	
2025	Sam Pang Tonight	Themselves	(S2E3)	

== Publications ==
- Hey, Let's Make a Band!, HarperCollins (14 October 2014) ISBN 978-0-06-236644-3
- 5 Seconds of Summer, Hal Leonard (1 January 2015) ISBN 978-1-4950-0778-1
- 5SOS Annual 2016, HarperCollins (21 September 2015) ISBN 978-0-00-814241-4
- 5 Seconds of Summer Book of Stuff, HarperCollins (6 October 2015) ISBN 978-0-06-242450-1
