= Michael Clifford (musician) =

Australian guitarist (born 1995)

- Michael Clifford at the O2 Arena 2026

Background information
- Born: Michael Gordon Clifford; 20 November 1995 (age 30); Quakers Hill, New South Wales, Australia
- Genres: Pop rock; pop; power pop; pop-punk; new wave; alternative rock; emo pop
- Occupation: Musician
- Instruments: Guitar; vocals
- Years active: 2011–present
- Member of: 5 Seconds of Summer
- Spouse: Crystal Leigh Clifford (m. 2021)
- Children: 2

Twitch information
- Channel: michaelclifford
- Years active: 2014–present
- Followers: 194K
- Last updated: 2025-10-14

Michael Gordon Clifford (born 20 November 1995) is an Australian musician, best known as the lead guitarist of the pop rock band 5 Seconds of Summer. Since 2014, 5 Seconds of Summer have sold more than 10 million albums, sold over 2 million concert tickets worldwide, and the band's song streams surpass 7 billion, making them one of the most successful Australian musical exports in history.

== Early life ==
Michael Gordon Clifford was born on 20 November 1995 and raised in the Quakers Hill suburb of Sydney, New South Wales, which is northwest of the city. He is the only child of parents Karen and Daryl Clifford, who ran a computer business based near Quakers Hill. Michael Clifford attended Norwest Christian College, where he befriended future band-mate Calum Hood in the third grade. For his high-school education, Clifford attended Norwest Christian College where he met band-mate, Luke Hemmings in Year 7. He later said that he initially "hated" Hemmings for "a solid year"; they became friends and formed the band. Clifford met future band-mate Ashton Irwin through mutual friends in Year 9. In a People magazine interview, he reflected that he "spent a lot of time away from school". Clifford's irregular attendance resulted in him leaving high school when he was in Year 10, instead completing a TAFE course.

Growing up, Clifford took both singing and piano lessons before quitting because he "hated" them. At the age of eleven, his parents bought him an acoustic guitar and Clifford began taking guitar lessons. In high-school, Clifford joined his school's church band as a guitarist.

== Career ==
=== 2011–present: 5 Seconds of Summer ===
In 2011, Clifford, Hood, and Hemmings began posting song covers on Hemmings' YouTube channel. The trio eventually added mutual friend Irwin to their videos, forming the current 5 Seconds of Summer lineup. After months of posting song covers together, the band began attracting interest from major music labels and publishers and initially signed a publishing deal with Sony/ATV Music Publishing. Clifford has since released six studio albums with the band, each met with worldwide success: 5 Seconds of Summer (2014), Sounds Good Feels Good (2015), Youngblood (2018), Calm (2020), 5SOS5 (2022), and Everyone's a Star! (2025).

At the NAMM Show in January 2019, Clifford, in collaboration with Gibson, introduced the Michael Clifford Signature Melody Maker guitar. The guitar was released for purchase in May 2019, with Clifford citing his main inspiration for the guitar being his own first guitar, Joan Jett's Melody Maker. He said that the goal of the Melody Maker was to "be an homage to the Joan Jett Melody Maker" and that he hoped the guitar would "inspire" someone, just as Jett inspired him. Clifford is the youngest guitarist to ever receive a custom guitar in his name.

Apart from the band, Clifford has expressed interest in gaming. His Twitch account, which he uses to live-stream game sessions, has amassed over 150,000 followers. During the Australian Bushfires of January 2020, Clifford held a charity Twitch live-stream, in which all proceeds were donated to Australian Red Cross.

=== 2025: Sidequest ===
On 27 March 2025, Clifford announced across his social media that he would be releasing his first solo single titled "Cool" the following Wednesday, and revealed that he's signed with the independent record label Hopeless Records. A snippet of the song was published later on the same day on TikTok. On the same day, Clifford was announced as the next guest on "Artist Friendly with Joel Madden" podcast. The description of the episode revealed that Clifford is preparing to release his debut studio album, later revealed to be called Sidequest.

"Cool" was officially released on 4 April as the lead single from Clifford's debut studio album, alongside a music video on his official YouTube channel. The second single "Give Me a Break" was released on 23 May and features the pop-rock band Waterparks. Sidequest was released on 25 July 2025 with additional features from American musicians Porter Robinson and Ryan Hall.

== Personal life ==
Clifford has been diagnosed with anxiety and depression. Since the beginning of his career, Clifford has used his platform to raise awareness and be an advocate for mental health. In June 2015, Clifford suffered minor face, hair, and shoulder injuries from a pyrotechnics accident during the band's Rock Out With Your Socks Out Tour at the SSE Wembley Arena in London.

In January 2019, Clifford announced his engagement to his girlfriend Crystal Leigh, a talent manager. On 11 January 2022, the couple revealed they had gotten married in a private ceremony a year prior. On 12 June 2023, Clifford and his wife announced they were expecting their first child. Their daughter, Lua Stevie Clifford, was born on 30 October 2023. In July 2025, Michael and his wife announced they were expecting their second child. In November 2025, they announced the birth of their second daughter, Sadie May Clifford.

In 2019, it was reported that Clifford bought an eight-bedroom, 4-acre mansion in Los Angeles' Valley Village neighborhood located in San Fernando Valley. In July 2020, Clifford's net worth was estimated to be US$20 million.

== Discography ==
=== Albums ===
List of albums, with selected details
Title	Album details	Peak chart positions			
Title	Album details	AUS	SCO	UK Sales	US Sales
Sidequest	Released: 25 July 2025; Label: Hopeless (HR7384-2); Format: CD, LP, digital	10	33	28	15

=== Singles ===
List of singles
Title	Year	Album
"Cool"	2025	Sidequest
"Give Me a Break!" (featuring Waterparks)	2025	Sidequest
"Kill Me for Always" (featuring Porter Robinson)	2025	Sidequest
"Enough"	2025	Sidequest
"Carry You Away (Demo)"	2025	Non-album single

=== Songwriting credits ===
List of songwriting credits, with recording artist(s), year released and album name show
Title	Year	Artist	Album	Notes
"And The Sun Will Shine Only For Us"	2015	Lizard Kisses	In The Morning b/w Close 7"	Drums
"Wake Up"	2018	Black Veil Brides	Vale	Composer
