= Luke Hemmings =

Australian singer and guitarist (born 1996)

- Luke Hemmings at The O2 Arena, London, 2026

Background information
- Born: Luke Robert Hemmings; 16 July 1996 (age 30)
- Origin: Freemans Reach, New South Wales, Australia
- Genres: Pop rock; power pop; pop punk; alternative rock
- Occupations: Singer; musician
- Children: 1
- Instruments: Vocals; guitar
- Years active: 2011–present
- Member of: 5 Seconds of Summer
- Spouse: Sierra Deaton (m. 2023)
- Website: lukehemmingsofficial.com

Luke Robert Hemmings (born 16 July 1996) is an Australian singer and musician, best known for being the lead vocalist, rhythm guitarist, and a founding member of the pop rock band 5 Seconds of Summer. Since 2014, 5 Seconds of Summer have sold more than 10 million albums, sold over two million concert tickets worldwide, and surpassed 7 billion song streams, making them one of the most successful Australian musical exports in history.

His debut studio album, When Facing the Things We Turn Away From, was released through Sony Music Australia on 13 August 2021. The album debuted atop the ARIA Albums Chart and peaked within the top 20 in Belgium and the United Kingdom.

Hemmings released a solo EP, Boy, on 26 April 2024. He also began touring with the EP on his Nostalgia For A Time That Never Existed Tour that started in May 2024.

== Early life ==
Hemmings was born the youngest of three boys on 16 July 1996 and raised in the Freemans Reach suburb of the Hawkesbury district in New South Wales. His father, Andrew Hemmings, was previously employed as a maintenance worker, while his mother, Liz Hemmings (née Pascoe), is a former accountant turned high school mathematics teacher, now working in photography. Hemmings has two older brothers: Ben and Jack, who both previously worked as builders, with the latter now owning a street-wear clothing label. Hemmings has spoken on his working-class upbringing; elaborating: "[The band's] beginnings were so humble. [...] I grew up in a small house in the middle of nowhere". When he was 10 years old, Hemmings' brothers taught him how to play guitar, later prompting him to take professional lessons and learning from YouTube tutorial videos to learn how to play the instrument. Eventually, Hemmings began busking throughout his later childhood.

In Year 7, Hemmings switched schools, attending Norwest Christian College, where he met future band-mates, Calum Hood and Michael Clifford, later revealing that he initially disliked and was "enemies" with Clifford. Hemmings eventually befriended Hood after they performed a Secondhand Serenade cover at a school talent show, and later befriended Clifford after learning they had similar music taste. Following the band's rise to fame, Hemmings continued with his high school education, opting to switch to distance learning. In 2013, he chose to not finish Year 12, the final year of secondary schooling in Australia, due to his commitment to the band.

== Career ==
=== 2011–present: 5 Seconds of Summer ===
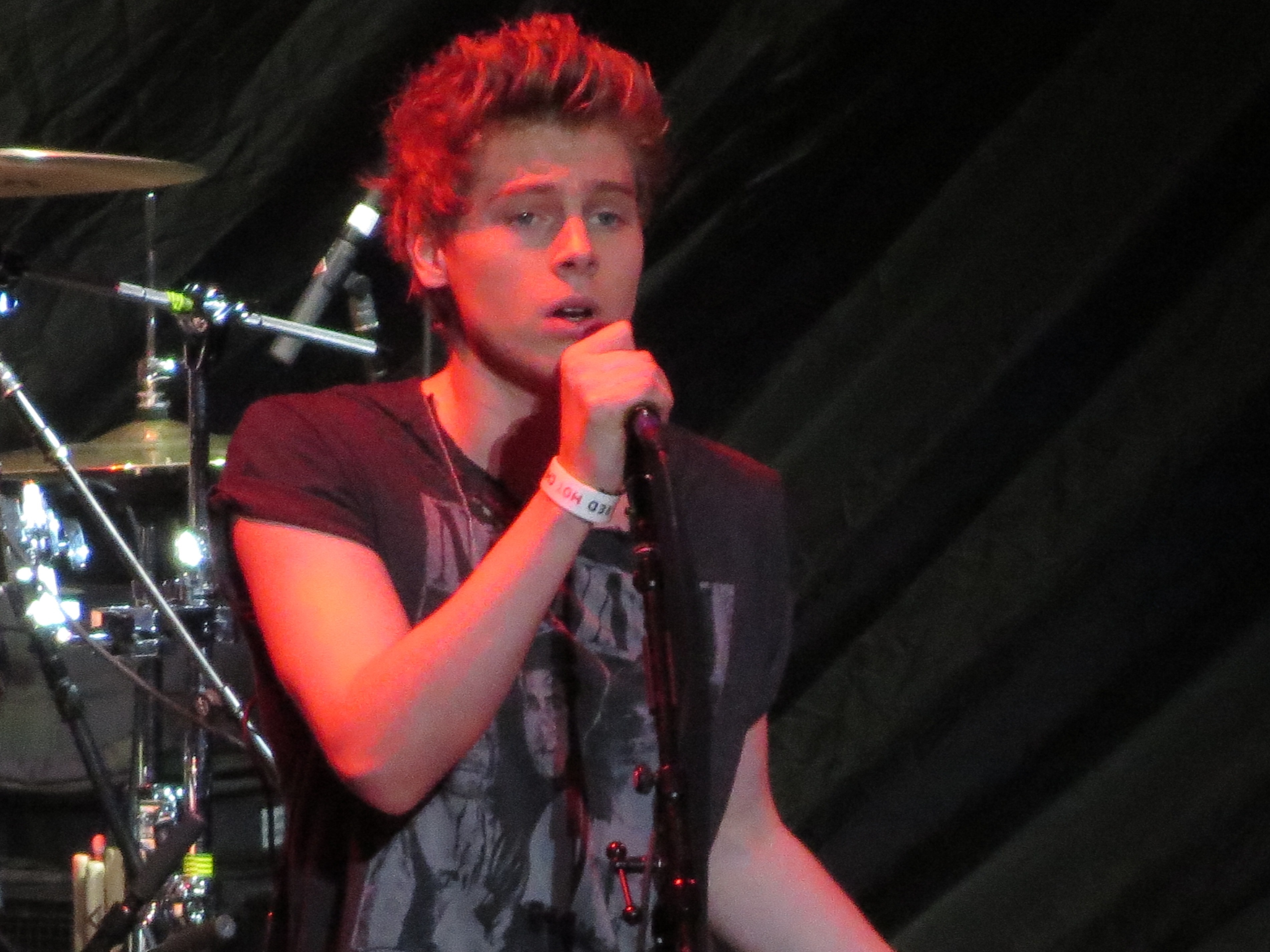
Hemmings performing with 5 Seconds of Summer in 2013

In 2011, at the age of 14, Hemmings began posting YouTube song cover videos, under the username "hemmo1996". Hemmings' first video, a cover of Mike Posner's "Please Don't Go", was posted on 3 February 2011. As Hemmings' covers began gaining traction on the platform, he invited Hood and Clifford to join his videos. The trio eventually added mutual friend Ashton Irwin to their videos, forming the current 5 Seconds of Summer lineup. Their first official gig was on 3 December 2011, at a bar in their hometown. After months of posting song covers together, the band began attracting interest from major music labels and publishers and signed a publishing deal with Sony/ATV Music Publishing. Hemmings has since released six studio albums with the band, each met with worldwide success: 5 Seconds of Summer (2014), Sounds Good Feels Good (2015), Youngblood (2018), Calm (2020), 5SOS5 (2022), and Everyone's a Star! (2025).

Apart from the band, Hemmings has also pursued modelling. Hemmings, along with his bandmates, is currently signed to the celebrity division of Wilhelmina Models. In February 2019, Hemmings attended New York Fashion Week, debuting as a model and walking the runway for Philipp Plein's Autumn/Winter 2019 Ready-To-Wear collection. In July 2019, Hemmings starred in Numéro Homme's video editorial. In December 2019, Hemmings was featured as the cover model on the Winter 2019 issue of Glass Man magazine.

=== 2021: When Facing the Things We Turn Away From ===
In June 2021, Hemmings announced his debut solo album When Facing the Things We Turn Away From, which was released on 13 August 2021. The album was preceded by the singles "Starting Line", "Motion" and "Place in Me".

=== 2024: Boy ===
In March 2024, Hemmings released "Shakes" and announced his second solo collection, Boy. The EP was preceded by a second single, "Close My Eyes", and Boy was released on 26 April 2024. On 4 May 2024, Hemmings embarked on his first solo tour, Nostalgia For a Time That Never Existed, which finished on 16 June. A second US leg of the tour was announced for late 2024 on 13 August, set to be supported by American singer-songwriter Sombr, but was cancelled on 21 October. Hemmings explained: "[...] I overcommitted and can't do it all without sacrificing the quality I've worked hard to maintain or my health." On 16 November 2024, Hemmings performed at the Corona Capital festival in Mexico. On 6 December 2024, Hemmings released a live EP, Nostalgia (Live from Los Angeles), recorded during the first leg of the tour, and preceded by the single "Close My Eyes (Live)".

== Personal life ==
In 2015, Hemmings began an on-again, off-again relationship with social media influencer Arzaylea Rodriguez. The couple ended their relationship in May 2017.

On 8 June 2021, Hemmings posted on his Instagram account announcing his engagement to his girlfriend of three years, Sierra Deaton. The couple currently live together in Los Angeles. He confirmed the two are married at the 81st Golden Globe Awards.

As of 2020, Hemmings' net worth is estimated to be US$20 million.

On 22 August 2025, Hemmings announced on his Instagram account that he and Deaton welcomed their first child, a daughter.

== Discography ==
=== Solo ===
==== Studio albums ====
List of solo studio albums and sales figures
| Title | Details | Peak chart positions | | | | | | | | | | Sales |
| Title | Details | AUS | BEL (FL) | NLD | NZ | POL | SCO | SPA | UK | US | US Rock | Sales |
|---|---|---|---|---|---|---|---|---|---|---|---|---|
| When Facing the Things We Turn Away From | Released: 13 August 2021; Label: Sony Music Australia; Formats: CD, LP, streaming, digital download | 1 | 141 | 64 | 33 | 16 | 13 | 50 | 51 | 124 | 17 | US: 6,000 |

==== EPs ====
List of solo EPs
| Title | Details | Peak chart positions | | | | | | | |
| Title | Details | AUS | BEL (FL) | NLD | POL | SCO | UK | US | US Rock |
|---|---|---|---|---|---|---|---|---|---|
| Boy | Released: 26 April 2024; Label: Arista, Sony; Formats: CD, LP, streaming, digital download | 4 | 70 | 11 | 21 | 7 | 22 | 99 | 18 |
| Nostalgia (Live from Los Angeles) | Released: 6 December 2024; Label: Arista, Sony; Formats: streaming, digital download | — | — | — | — | — | — | — | — |

==== Singles ====
List of singles, with year released and album name shown
| Title | Year | Peak chart positions | Album |
| Title | Year | NZ Hot | Album |
|---|---|---|---|
| "Starting Line" | 2021 | 31 | When Facing the Things We Turn Away From |
| "Motion" | 2021 | — | When Facing the Things We Turn Away From |
| "Place in Me" | 2021 | — | When Facing the Things We Turn Away From |
| "Baby Blue" | 2021 | 38 | When Facing the Things We Turn Away From |
| "Shakes" | 2024 | — | Boy |
| "Close My Eyes" | 2024 | — | Boy |
| "Close My Eyes (Live)" | 2024 | — | Nostalgia (Live from Los Angeles) |

==== Song credits ====
| Year | Title | Artist | Album | Notes |
|---|---|---|---|---|
| 2014 | "Teenage Queen" | Donghae & Eunhyuk | Ride Me | Composer |
| 2017 | "Who's Laughing Now" | Goldfinger | The Knife | Composer |
| 2019 | "Forgive" | Gnash | Non-album single | Co-writer, Composer, Guitar, Instrumentation, Programmer, Vocals |

=== With 5 Seconds of Summer ===
- 5 Seconds of Summer (2014)
- Sounds Good Feels Good (2015)
- Youngblood (2018)
- CALM (2020)
- 5SOS5 (2022)
- Everyone's a Star! (2025)

== Tours ==
- Nostalgia For a Time That Never Existed (2024)
  - First Leg (May - June 2024)
  - Second Leg (November 2024)

== Awards and nominations ==
=== Rolling Stone Australia Awards ===
The Rolling Stone Australia Awards are awarded annually in January or February by the Australian edition of Rolling Stone magazine for outstanding contributions to popular culture in the previous year.

| Year | Nominee / work | Award | Result | Ref. |
|---|---|---|---|---|
| 2025 | Luke Hemmings | Rolling Stone Global Award | Shortlisted | |
