= Youngblood (5 Seconds of Summer song) =

2018 single by 5 Seconds of Summer

- Acoustic version cover art

Single by 5 Seconds of Summer

from the album Youngblood
- Released: 12 April 2018
- Genre: Pop rock; synth-pop; new wave
- Length: 3:23
- Label: Capitol
- Songwriters: Calum Hood; Ali Tamposi; Andrew Watt; Ashton Irwin; Luke Hemmings; Louis Bell
- Producers: Watt; Bell

5 Seconds of Summer singles chronology
"Want You Back" (2018)	"Youngblood" (2018)	"Valentine" (2018)

Music video
- "Youngblood" on YouTube

"Youngblood" is a song recorded by Australian pop rock band 5 Seconds of Summer. It was written by members Calum Hood, Ali Tamposi, and Luke Hemmings alongside producers Andrew Watt and Louis Bell, with fellow member Michael Clifford on lead guitar. The song was released via Capitol Records on 12 April 2018, as the second single from their third studio album of the same name.

"Youngblood" peaked at the top of the ARIA Singles Chart in May 2018, becoming the band's second number-one single on the chart, spending eight consecutive weeks at the top and becoming the biggest-selling single of 2018 in Australia. Outside Australia, "Youngblood" topped the charts in New Zealand and peaked within the top ten of the charts in eleven countries, including Canada, the United Kingdom and United States, becoming their first top ten singles in the former and latter countries.

"Youngblood" has been certified multi-platinum in Australia, New Zealand, and the United Kingdom, platinum in the United States and Canada, and gold in Italy, Belgium and Brazil. At the ARIA Music Awards of 2018, "Youngblood" won the ARIA Award for Song of the Year and is the most streamed Australian song of all time on Apple Music. "Youngblood" sold over five million adjusted copies worldwide within six months of release, the eleventh best-selling single of all time in Australia. and has been honored in the APRA AMCOS' The 1,000,000,000 List, for having been streamed over 1 billion times.

== Background and release ==
The song was initially released as an instant download track with the pre-order of the album, but was later released as a single. Describing the song, the band's drummer Ashton Irwin stated: "We loved that new wave could be really melancholy, but also up. It had romanticism and anger, but also energy and colour. That's exactly what we wanted for our new music."

An audio clip of the song was released on 20 April 2018 on the band's official YouTube channel. The video has received over 43 million views as of April 2023.

The song has amassed over 525 million views on its official music video.

== Critical reception ==
"Youngblood" received positive reviews from critics, with Jon Blistein of Rolling Stone describing the song as having a "relentless, thumping rhythm, around which 5 Seconds of Summer move between delicate verses and a booming chorus".

Melodic Magazine praised the song for having "such a fun, catchy beat that had [me] listening to the song practically daily" and that "Youngblood set the tone for the album, showing the band's musical growth over the last few years".

Medium.com labelled the song as "cohesive and strong" and that it was "clear that [5 Seconds of Summer] spent their time honing a craft [that was] overlooked by stereotyping naysayers".

== Commercial performance ==
"Youngblood" achieved global success, topping the Apple Music and Spotify charts as well as reaching number one in Australia in May 2018, becoming the band's second number-one single in their home country, spending eight consecutive weeks at the top. The track was the most-streamed song in Australia on Spotify during the 2018 winter period. "Youngblood" has been certified 11 times platinum in Australia, was officially certified Australia's 2018 song of the year and won the ARIA Award for Song of the Year. The song also reached number one in New Zealand, spending four consecutive weeks at the top. It has been certified triple platinum in the country.

In the United States, "Youngblood" peaked at number seven on the Billboard Hot 100, becoming their first top ten single and their highest-charting single to date. It also became their first single to peak at number one on the Billboard Mainstream Top 40 airplay chart (also known as Pop Songs airplay chart), topping the chart for five consecutive weeks, making them the first Australian band to top the chart in 21 years. The song also reached number one on the Adult Top 40 (also known as Adult Pop Songs chart), topping the chart for two consecutive weeks, and number two on the Radio Songs chart (airplay chart across all genres). It has been certified double platinum in the country.

In the United Kingdom, "Youngblood" peaked at number four on the UK Singles Chart, spending over six months on the chart and becoming their third highest-charting single in Britain behind "She Looks So Perfect" and "Don't Stop", which peaked at number one and number two on the UK Singles Chart in March 2014 and June 2014 respectively. The single was certified triple platinum by the British Phonographic Industry. The single did well in Britain during the summer months, from 1 June to 30 August, and ranked seventh on the Official Charts Company's Top 40 Biggest Song of the Summer 2018, while the music video ranked ninth place on The Official Top 40 songs most streamed on video of 2018 so far. "Youngblood" eventually became the country's 28th-highest-selling single of 2018.

In Canada, the single peaked at number three on the Canadian Hot 100, becoming the band's first top ten hit in Canada and their highest-charting single in the country. It also became their first single to peak atop Canada's Contemporary Hit Radio/Top 40 Airplay chart, topping the chart for four consecutive weeks, and at number two on the Adult Contemporary chart. It has been certified platinum in the country.

As well as appearing on multiple weekly and year-end charts over several countries, "Youngblood" appeared at number thirty-seven on the ARIA decade-end chart (2010–2019), which ranks the most popular songs of the decade, and at number four on the ARIA Australian decade-end chart (2010–2019), which ranks the most popular songs of the decade by Australian artists. As of January 2022, "Youngblood" has spent over 197 consecutive weeks (over 3.5 years) in the Top 20 on the ARIA Australian Singles chart. Additionally, "Youngblood" is the eleventh best-selling single of all time in Australia.

"Youngblood" sold over five million copies within six months of release and is the most streamed Australian song of all time on Apple Music. In February 2020, 5 Seconds of Summer were honored in the APRA AMCOS' The 1,000,000,000 List, for "Youngblood" reaching 1 billion combined streams. In June 2020, "Youngblood" was awarded an ASCAP Pop Music Award. As of November 2022, the track has over 1.4 billion streams on Spotify.

== Live performances ==
The song was performed live for the first time on 20 March 2018 at the band's concert in Stockholm, Sweden as part of their sold out 5SOS III Tour.

After the song was released as a single, the band performed it on The Voice Australia. They performed a stripped back version of the song on BBC Radio 1's Live Lounge on 12 June 2018, and have also performed it during their visits at various other radio stations. On 22 June 2018, they performed it on The Today Show's Summer Concert Series, and on 28 November 2018 at the 32nd Annual ARIA Awards.

In August 2018, the band uploaded a performance to their official YouTube channel, performing "Youngblood" live for their Apple Music documentary titled,"5SOS - On The Record." The live performance amassed over 4 million views.

The song has become a staple of the band's live shows, since debuting on the setlist for the 5SOS III Tour. It was played as the last song of the encore on the Meet You There Tour, and has become the song the band usually closes their sets with. This was also the case, when the band performed at the Fire Fight Australia relief concert on 16 February 2020.

== Music video ==
An "alternative" music video for the song was released on the band's YouTube channel on 26 April 2018. It is filmed in monochrome and intercuts backstage tour footage with a live performance of the song. As of January 2025, the video has accumulated over 320 million views.

The song's official music video was released on 2 August 2018 while the band was in Japan for their tour. Directed by Frank Borin, the video was filmed in Tokyo and tells the story of an elderly couple in their final moments, given 24 hours to relive their youth (where they are played by Japanese artists "JOHNNY" Daigo Yamashita and Misaki Aono) which then dives into the Japanese Rockabilly culture. As of January 2025, the video has garnered over 245 million views.

== Track listing ==
- Digital download
1. "Youngblood" – 3:23
- Digital download – acoustic
1. "Youngblood" (acoustic) – 3:40
- Digital download – R3hab remix
1. "Youngblood" (R3hab remix) – 2:30
2. "Youngblood" (R3hab extended remix) – 2:55

== Credits and personnel ==
5 Seconds of Summer

- Luke Hemmings – lead vocals, rhythm guitar
- Michael Clifford – lead guitar, backing vocals
- Calum Hood – bass guitar, backing vocals
- Ashton Irwin – drums, backing vocals

Additional musicians

- Ali Tamposi – composition
- Andrew Watt – composition, production
- Louis Bell – production

== Angus & Julia Stone cover ==
On 2 November 2018, Angus & Julia Stone released a cover version of the song as a non-album single. Their version was certified Gold by the Australian Recording Industry Association (ARIA) in 2024.

== Charts ==
=== Weekly charts ===
Chart (2018–2021)	Peak position
Australia (ARIA)	1
Australian Artists (ARIA)	1
Austria (Ö3 Austria Top 40)	19
Belgium (Ultratop 50 Flanders)	5
Belgium (Ultratop 50 Wallonia)	43
Canada Hot 100 (Billboard)	3
Canada All Format (Billboard)	2
Canada CHR/Top 40 (Billboard)	1
Canada Hot AC (Billboard)	1
CIS (TopHit)	23
Czech Republic Airplay (ČNS IFPI)	6
Czech Republic Singles Digital (ČNS IFPI)	11
Croatia Airplay (HRT)	20
Denmark (Tracklisten)	2
Euro Digital Song Sales (Billboard)	9
Finland (Suomen virallinen lista)	16
France (SNEP)	110
Germany (GfK)	45
Hungary (Single Top 40)	32
Hungary (Stream Top 40)	5
Ireland (IRMA)	4
Italy (FIMI)	39
Japan Hot 100 (Billboard)	49
Malaysia (RIM)	12
Mexico Ingles Airplay (Billboard)	31
Netherlands (Dutch Top 40)	8
Netherlands (Single Top 100)	7
New Zealand (Recorded Music NZ)	1
Norway (VG-lista)	4
Poland Airplay (ZPAV)	2
Portugal (AFP)	11
Scottish Singles Sales (Official Charts)	2
Singapore (RIAS)	5
Slovakia Airplay (ČNS IFPI)	75
Slovakia Singles Digital (ČNS IFPI)	6
Spain (PROMUSICAE)	88
Sweden (Sverigetopplistan)	4
Switzerland (Schweizer Hitparade)	33
UK Singles (Official Charts)	4
Ukraine Airplay (TopHit)	87
US Billboard Hot 100	7
US Adult Contemporary (Billboard)	14
US Adult Pop Airplay (Billboard)	1
US Dance Airplay (Billboard)	3
US Pop Airplay (Billboard)	1
US Rolling Stone Top 100	85

=== Year-end charts ===
Chart (2018)	Position
Australia (ARIA)	1
Australian Artists (ARIA)	1
Austria (Ö3 Austria Top 40)	39
Belgium (Ultratop Flanders)	21
Canada (Canadian Hot 100)	26
Denmark (Tracklisten)	3
Guatemala Anglo (Monitor Latino)	55
Iceland (Plötutíóindi)	26
Ireland (IRMA)	15
Netherlands (Dutch Top 40)	12
Netherlands (Single Top 100)	13
New Zealand (Recorded Music NZ)	3
Poland (ZPAV)	47
Portugal (AFP)	19
Sweden (Sverigetopplistan)	19
Switzerland (Schweizer Hitparade)	70
UK Singles (Official Charts Company)	28
US Billboard Hot 100	36
US Adult Top 40 (Billboard)	27
US Dance/Mix Show Airplay (Billboard)	33
US Mainstream Top 40 (Billboard)	13
Venezuela Anglo (Monitor Latino)	39
Chart (2019)	Position
Australia (ARIA)	30
Australian Artists (ARIA)	3
Belgium (Ultratop Flanders)	55
Canada (Canadian Hot 100)	25
Denmark (Tracklisten)	46
Guatemala Anglo (Monitor Latino)	81
Latvia (LAIPA)	55
New Zealand (Recorded Music NZ)	38
Portugal (AFP)	89
US Billboard Hot 100	33
US Adult Contemporary (Billboard)	44
US Adult Top 40 (Billboard)	21
US Mainstream Top 40 (Billboard)	28
US Rolling Stone Top 100	60
Venezuela Anglo (Monitor Latino)	43
Chart (2020)	Position
Australia (ARIA)	72
Chart (2021)	Position
Australia (ARIA)	81

=== Decade-end charts ===
Chart (2010–2019)	Position
Australia (ARIA)	37
Australian Artists (ARIA)	4

== Certifications ==
Region	Certification	Certified units/sales
Australia (ARIA)	30× Platinum	2,100,000^{‡}
Belgium (BRMA)	Platinum	40,000^{‡}
Brazil (Pro-Música Brasil)	2× Diamond	320,000^{‡}
Canada (Music Canada)	Platinum	80,000^{‡}
Denmark (IFPI Danmark)	4× Platinum	360,000^{‡}
France (SNEP)	Platinum	200,000^{‡}
Germany (BVMI)	Gold	200,000^{‡}
Italy (FIMI)	Platinum	50,000^{‡}
Mexico (AMPROFON)	Platinum	60,000^{‡}
New Zealand (RMNZ)	8× Platinum	240,000^{‡}
Poland (ZPAV)	Diamond	100,000^{‡}
Portugal (AFP)	3× Platinum	30,000^{‡}
Spain (Promusicae)	Platinum	60,000^{‡}
United Kingdom (BPI)	4× Platinum	2,400,000^{‡}
United States (RIAA)	6× Platinum	6,000,000^{‡}
Streaming
Sweden (GLF)	2× Platinum	16,000,000^{†}
^{‡} Sales+streaming figures based on certification alone.^{†} Streaming-only figures based on certification alone.

== Release history ==
Region	Date	Format	Version	Label	Ref.
Various	12 April 2018	Digital download	Original	Capitol	
United States	22 May 2018	Contemporary hit radio	Original	Capitol	

== See also ==
- List of best-selling singles in Australia
