= Teeth (5 Seconds of Summer song) =

Single by 5 Seconds of Summer

from the album Calm and the soundtrack of 13 Reasons Why: Season 3
- Released: 21 August 2019
- Recorded: 2019
- Genre: Industrial; grunge; rock
- Length: 3:25
- Label: Interscope
- Songwriters: Ali Tamposi; Ashton Irwin; Luke Hemmings; Andrew Watt; Bernard Sumner; Carl Sturken; Evan Rogers; Peter Hook; Gillian Gilbert; Ryan Tedder; Stephen Morris
- Producers: Andrew Watt; Louis Bell

5 Seconds of Summer singles chronology
"Easier" (2019)	"Teeth" (2019)	"No Shame" (2020)

Music video
- "Teeth" on YouTube

"Teeth" is a song by Australian pop rock band 5 Seconds of Summer, released on 21 August 2019 as the second single from the band's fourth studio album Calm. It also appears on the third season soundtrack of the Netflix series 13 Reasons Why. Written by band members Luke Hemmings and Ashton Irwin with Ali Tamposi, and produced by Andrew Watt and Louis Bell, the track features guitar from Tom Morello of Rage Against the Machine, and its music video was released the same day. The track's instrumental samples "So What", an unreleased song by late American rapper Juice Wrld and also produced by Bell and Watt, which was recorded in 2018 during the sessions for Wrld on Drugs, Juice Wrld's collaborative mixtape with American rapper Future.

Similarly to the band's previous single "Easier", an alternate "Live from the Vault" version of the song was released. "Teeth – Live from the Vault" was released on 30 October 2019 and was accompanied by a video directed by Thibaut Duverneix.

At the APRA Music Awards of 2020, "Teeth" was nominated for Song of the Year, while it won Song of the Year at the 2020 ARIA Music Awards.

== Promotion ==
The song was announced on the band's social media on 16 August 2019, along with a 15-second teaser that Alternative Press called "ominous". The song was used as the official theme song for WWE Survivor Series 2019 in addition to appearing in ESPN's 2019 Saturday Night Football season.

== Critical reception ==
Billboard wrote that the song "sees the group venturing even further into the industrial sounds and themes the band began to explore with previous release 'Easier'". Rolling Stone described the song as "industrial pop" and noted that it "culls from the same well of brooding, ominous industrial rock and nu-metal that inspired their Nine Inch Nails-inspired 'Easier.'"

== Music video ==
The music video, directed by Thibaut Duverneix and also released on 21 August 2019, features the band "subjected to an experiment-gone-wrong resulting in each member's personal hellscape", and was called "dark" and "creepy" by Rolling Stone. It starts with the 4 members in what seems to be like a dentist's office. In their dreams, the members successfully escape their hellscape. Luke is in a foggy room, Ashton is in a room where the walls are made of linen blown by a big fan, Calum tries to pull a big brick using chains, and Michael climbs a tall ladder. As of 10 June 2022, it has more than 130 million views.

== Live performances ==
The song was performed live for the first time on 11 September 2019 as part of the band's stripped back show at 97.1 AMP Radio's SoCal Honda Sound Stage Pop Up. The next day, on 12 September 2019, it was performed on The Late Late Show with James Corden. The song was also performed live on A Little Late with Lilly Singh and was part of the band's setlist for the World War Joy Tour.

On 7 October 2019, the song was performed on ESPN Monday Night Football Genesis Halftime Show, with the accompanying performance video being released the same day.

== Charts ==
=== Weekly charts ===
Chart (2019–2020)	Peak position
Australia (ARIA)	15
Australia Digital Song Sales (Billboard)	10
Austria (Ö3 Austria Top 40)	70
Belgium (Ultratip Bubbling Under Flanders)	2
Canada Hot 100 (Billboard)	63
Canada Digital Song Sales (Billboard)	10
Czech Republic Singles Digital (ČNS IFPI)	44
Denmark (Tracklisten)	38
Estonia (Eesti Ekspress)	40
Hungary (Single Top 40)	25
Hungary (Stream Top 40)	15
Ireland (IRMA)	42
Israel (Media Forest)	27
Latvia (LAIPA)	26
Lithuania (AGATA)	18
Mexico Ingles Airplay (Billboard)	38
Netherlands (Dutch Top 40)	15
Netherlands (Single Top 100)	31
New Zealand (Recorded Music NZ)	25
Portugal (AFP)	97
Scottish Singles Sales (Official Charts)	19
Singapore (RIAS)	18
Slovakia Singles Digital (ČNS IFPI)	30
Sweden (Sverigetopplistan)	65
Switzerland (Schweizer Hitparade)	99
UK Singles (Official Charts)	46
US Bubbling Under Hot 100 (Billboard)	4
US Digital Song Sales (Billboard)	13
US Pop Airplay (Billboard)	21
US Rolling Stone Top 100	85
Venezuela Anglo (Record Report)	25

=== Year-end charts ===
Chart (2019)	Position
Australian Artist (ARIA)	15
Netherlands (Dutch Top 40)	49

== Certifications ==
Region	Certification	Certified units/sales
Australia (ARIA)	5× Platinum	350,000^{‡}
Brazil (Pro-Música Brasil)	3× Platinum	120,000^{‡}
Canada (Music Canada)	Gold	40,000^{‡}
Denmark (IFPI Danmark)	Gold	45,000^{‡}
France (SNEP)	Gold	100,000^{‡}
Germany (BVMI)	Gold	300,000^{‡}
Italy (FIMI)	Gold	50,000^{‡}
New Zealand (RMNZ)	2× Platinum	60,000^{‡}
Poland (ZPAV)	2× Platinum	100,000^{‡}
Portugal (AFP)	Gold	5,000^{‡}
Spain (Promusicae)	Gold	30,000^{‡}
United Kingdom (BPI)	Platinum	600,000^{‡}
United States (RIAA)	Gold	500,000^{‡}
Streaming
Japan (RIAJ)	Gold	50,000,000^{†}
^{‡} Sales+streaming figures based on certification alone.^{†} Streaming-only figures based on certification alone.

== Release history ==
Region	Date	Format	Label	Ref.
Various	21 August 2019	Digital download; streaming	Interscope	
United States	17 September 2019	Contemporary hit radio	Interscope	
Italy	18 October 2019	Contemporary hit radio	Universal	
