= Old Me (5 Seconds of Summer song) =

Single by 5 Seconds of Summer

from the album Calm
- Released: 21 February 2020
- Recorded: 2019–2020
- Genre: Pop rock; alternative rock; EDM
- Length: 3:04
- Label: Interscope; Polydor
- Songwriters: Luke Hemmings; Ashton Irwin; Alexandra Tamposi; Andrew Wotman; William Walsh; Louis Bell; Brian Lee; Andre Proctor
- Producers: Andrew Watt; Louis Bell; Dre Moon

5 Seconds of Summer singles chronology
"No Shame" (2020)	"Old Me" (2020)	"Wildflower" (2020)

Music video
- "Old Me" on YouTube

"Old Me" is a song by Australian pop rock band 5 Seconds of Summer, released on 21 February 2020 originally as the first promotional single from the band's fourth studio album Calm, before being released to radio on 6 March 2020 as the album's fourth single. The song was written by Luke Hemmings, Ashton Irwin, Alexandra Tamposi, Andrew Wotman, William Walsh, Louis Bell, Brian Lee and Andre Proctor.

== Background ==
In a statement, Hemmings said "'Old Me' carries a youthful spirit and follows the narrative of a young person's life growing up, for better or for worse. Every decision we made, whether right or wrong, has led us to the men we are proud to be today. We were thrown into the public eye at a young age and gratefully had each other at a confusing time. Sometimes it's important we look back in order to appreciate the journey we've been on together."

"Old Me" was originally supposed to feature a verse from the late American rapper Juice WRLD, but the verse was scrapped after his death in December 2019.

== Composition ==
Amelia Parreira of Riff magazine described the lyrics of "Old Me" as being "a shout-out to a past self and past decisions". The song begins with an underlying organ before a "plethora of percussion pumps up the beat to transform the track into a high-energy dance anthem". Parreira said the sound is a metaphor of the band leaving the past behind. Gigwise's Malvika Padin had a similar notion, labelling the song "retrospective".

== Music video ==
A music video to accompany the release of "Old Me" was first released onto YouTube on 10 March 2020. As of March 2021, it has over 26 million views.

== Charts ==
=== Weekly charts ===
Chart (2020)	Peak position
Australia (ARIA)	39
Belgium (Ultratop 50 Flanders)	50
Belgium (Ultratip Bubbling Under Wallonia)	8
Ireland (IRMA)	70
Lithuania (AGATA)	79
Netherlands (Dutch Top 40)	26
Netherlands (Single Top 100)	61
New Zealand Hot Singles (RMNZ)	3
Portugal (AFP)	189
Scottish Singles Sales (Official Charts)	99
UK Singles Downloads (Official Charts)	94
US Bubbling Under Hot 100 (Billboard)	5
US Pop Airplay (Billboard)	28

=== Year-end charts ===
Chart (2020)	Position
Australian Artist (ARIA)	45

== Certifications ==
Region	Certification	Certified units/sales
Australia (ARIA)	Platinum	70,000^{‡}
Brazil (Pro-Música Brasil)	Platinum	40,000^{‡}
Canada (Music Canada)	Gold	40,000^{‡}
^{‡} Sales+streaming figures based on certification alone.

== Release history ==
Region	Date	Format	Label	Ref.
Various	21 February 2020 (Note: Release as a promotional single.)	Digital download streaming	Interscope; Polydor	
Italy	6 March 2020	Contemporary hit radio	Universal	
United States	10 March 2020	Contemporary hit radio	Interscope; Polydor	
