= The 5 Seconds of Summer Show =

2023 concert tour by 5 Seconds of Summer

- Tour by 5 Seconds of Summer
- Promotional poster
- Location: Europe; North America; South America
- Associated album: 5SOS5
- Start date: 19 July 2023
- End date: 12 October 2023
- Legs: 3
- No. of shows: 42

5 Seconds of Summer concert chronology
- Take My Hand World Tour (2022); The 5 Seconds of Summer Show (2023); Everyone's a Star! World Tour (2026)

The 5 Seconds of Summer Show was the fifth headlining concert tour by the Australian pop rock band 5 Seconds of Summer in support of their fifth studio album 5SOS5 (2022). The tour began on 19 July 2023 in Argentina at Estadio Luna Park and concluded on 12 October 2023 in the Czech Republic at the Fortuna Arena, consisting of 42 dates in total.

== Background ==
The tour stretched from July to October 2023, making stops throughout South America, North America, the UK, and Europe. It followed an especially packed period for the band as they had just marked their 10-year milestone, wrapped up the Take My Hand World Tour in 2022, and released their fifth studio album, 5SOS5.

The concert itself was styled like a high-energy variety show or late-night program, complete with a dramatic curtain reveal and humorous video segments featuring the band in character. The setlist was notably long, bringing back many nostalgic fan favorites that hadn’t been performed live in years.

One of the most notable elements was the "Dice Song." During this part of the show, a huge inflatable red die, labeled with possible surprise songs, was tossed into the crowd. Fans would roll it to determine which bonus track the band would perform.

== Tour dates ==
List of 2023 concerts (Note: Attributed to multiple references:)
Date (2023)	City	Country	Venue	Opening acts	Attendance	Revenue
19 July	Buenos Aires	Argentina	Estadio Luna Park	Santi Muk	—	—
20 July	Buenos Aires	Argentina	Estadio Luna Park	Santi Muk	—	—
23 July	Rio de Janeiro	Brazil	Vivo Rio		—	—
25 July	San Paulo	Brazil	Espaco Unimed		—	—
27 July	Santiago	Chile	Movistar Arena		11,107 / 13,117	$703,103
30 July	Bogotá	Colombia	Movistar Arena		—	—
10 August	Uncasville	United States	Mohegan Sun Arena		7,062 / 7,062	$521,829
12 August	Boston	United States	MGM Music Hall at Fenway		4,949 / 4,949	$312,188
15 August	Toronto	Canada	Budweiser Stage		—	—
16 August	Detroit	United States	Pine Knob Music Theatre		10,510 / 10,510	$408,178
18 August	Bristow	United States	Jiffy Lube Live		10,310 / 10,310	$578,009
19 August	Philadelphia	United States	TD Pavilion at The Mann		10,656 / 10,656	$517,275
21 August	New York City	United States	Madison Square Garden		14,275 / 14,275	$1,190,230
23 August	Chicago	United States	Huntington Bank Pavilion		9,188 / 9,188	$532,538
25 August	Cuyahoga Falls	United States	Blossom Music Center		8,156 / 8,156	$414,328
26 August	Cincinnati	United States	Riverbend Music Center		9,917 / 9,917	$435,360
28 August	Minneapolis	United States	The Armory		6,048 / 6,048	$296,242
30 August	Indianapolis	United States	TCU Ampitheater		5,439 / 5,439	$306,906
1 September	Franklin	United States	FirstBank Amphitheater		6,887 / 6,887	$517,345
2 September	Alpharetta	United States	Ameris Bank Amphitheatre		10,881 / 10,881	$666,788
3 September	Raleigh	United States	Red Hat Amphitheater		5,900 / 5,900	$404,537
6 September	Hollywood	United States	Hard Rock Live		6,739 / 6,739	$499,958
9 September	The Woodlands	United States	Cynthia Woods Mitchell Pavilion		10,480 / 10,480	$592,667
10 September	Irving	United States	Toyota Music Factory		7,744 / 7,744	$453,777
13 September	Phoenix	United States	Talking Stick Resort Amphitheatre		8,025 / 8,025	$461,816
14 September	Inglewood	United States	Kia Forum		14,384 / 14,384	$1,040,651
23 September	Lisbon	Portugal	Campo Pequeno		—	—
24 September	Madrid	Spain	Palacio Vistalegre		—	—
26 September	Milan	Italy	Mediolanum Forum		—	—
27 September	Stuttgart	Germany	Porsche Arena		—	—
28 September	Düsseldorf	Germany	Mitsubishi Electric Halle		—	—
30 September	Brussels	Belgium	Palais 12		—	—
1 October	Amsterdam	Netherlands	Ziggo Dome		—	—
3 October	Glasgow	Scotland	OVO Hydro		—	—
4 October	Manchester	England	AO Arena		—	—
5 October	London	England	O2 Arena		—	—
7 October	Esch-sur-Alzette	Luxembourg	Rockhal		—	—
8 October	Paris	France	La Seine Musicale		—	—
10 October	Budapest	Hungary	László Papp Budapest Sports Arena		—	—
11 October	Gliwice	Poland	Arena Gliwice		—	—
12 October	Prague	Czech Republic	Fortuna Arena		—	—
Total					178,657 / 180,667 (99%)	$10,853,725

== Personnel ==
- Luke Hemmings – lead vocals, rhythm guitar, piano
- Michael Clifford – lead guitar, vocals, piano
- Calum Hood – bass guitar, keyboard, vocals
- Ashton Irwin – drums, percussion, vocals
