= Wildflower (5 Seconds of Summer song) =

Single by 5 Seconds of Summer

from the album Calm
- Released: 27 March 2020
- Genre: New wave; soft rock; dance-pop
- Length: 3:40
- Label: Interscope; Polydor
- Songwriters: Calum Hood; Ashton Irwin; Michael Clifford; Geoff Warburton; Oscar Gorres; Rami Yacoub
- Producer: Oscar Gorres

5 Seconds of Summer singles chronology
"Old Me" (2020)	"Wildflower" (2020)	"2011" (2021)

Music video
- "Wildflower" on YouTube

"Wildflower" is a song by Australian pop rock band 5 Seconds of Summer, released on 25 March 2020 as the second promotional single from their fourth studio album Calm, before being released as the album's fifth single to radio on 17 April 2020.

== Background ==
Breaking the precedent set by previous 5 Seconds of Summer albums, “Wildflower” is the only track from Calm to feature bassist Calum Hood (or any member other than Luke Hemmings) on lead vocals. Talking about the song, Hood said, "We wanted to make the chorus kind of a choose-your-own-adventure, where some words are left out and then accentuated by these big stabs of synth. It lets everyone come up with their own interpretation, and fill in whatever they think those missing lyrics might be."

== Reception ==
Chris Payne of Billboard said, "The fifth single off Calm takes root in the flashy '80s touches that have served the Aussie quartet well in the past. Booming drumbeats, psychedelic harmonies, and synthy karate chops abound."

In a review of the album, David from auspOp said "'Wildflower' is the most pop-centric these boys sound on the album... it's an addictively good song."

== Lyric and music videos ==
A lyric video was released along with the release of the single on 25 March 2020. The video was made by the band's creative director Andy DeLuca and Sarah Eiseman and features a circle of moving flowers with the song lyrics in the centre. The video was made with stop-motion animation, using 358 different photos.

The band had originally planned a big-budget music video, but the shoot was cancelled last minute due to the stay-at-home order issued in California to mitigate the COVID-19 pandemic. Instead, each band member filmed themselves in front of a green screen which was passed around from house to house. According to DeLuca, who directed the video, he and assistant director Eiseman then, "quickly learned animation and drew up several blooming flowers, and also created the trippy colored backgrounds using milk and food dye. I then spent the next couple of days/nights editing nonstop until my eyes bled and the video was completed."

The resulting video was released on 16 April 2020. It was described by Rolling Stone as "trippy" and "psychedelic" and DeLuca said of the concept behind the video, "Since the song has a pretty distinct 80s/90s tone, I came up with the idea of making an 80's/90's MTV-style music video. A 'music-video-themed music video'. The stuff I grew up on and loved."

== Personnel ==
Credits adapted from Tidal.

- Oscar Gorres – producer, composer, lyricist, associated performer, background vocalist, programmer
- Ashton Irwin – composer, lyricist, associated performer, background vocalist, drums
- Calum Hood – composer, lyricist, associated performer, background vocalist, bass guitar, lead vocals
- Geoff Warburton – composer, lyricist, associated performer, background vocalist
- Michael Clifford – composer, lyricist, associated performer, background vocalist, guitar
- Rami Yacoub – composer, lyricist
- Matt Wolach – assistant mixer, studio personnel
- Luke Hemmings – associated performer, background vocalist
- Dave Kutch – mastering engineer, studio personnel
- Mike "Spike" Stent – mixer, studio personnel

== Charts ==
Chart (2020)	Peak position
Australia (ARIA)	80
Ireland (IRMA)	80
Lithuania (AGATA)	95
Netherlands (Tipparade)	16
New Zealand Hot Singles (RMNZ)	8
UK Singles (OCC)	81

== Certifications ==
Certifications for "Wildflower"
Region	Certification	Certified units/sales
Australia (ARIA)	Gold	35,000^{‡}
^{‡} Sales+streaming figures based on certification alone.

== Release history ==
Region	Date	Format	Label	Ref.
Various	25 March 2020 (Note: Release as a promotional single.)	Digital download; streaming	Interscope; Polydor	
Australia	27 March 2020	Contemporary hit radio	Universal Music Australia	
Italy	17 April 2020	Contemporary hit radio	Universal	
United Kingdom	17 April 2020	Contemporary hit radio	Interscope; Universal UK	
