= Take My Hand World Tour =

2022 concert tour by 5 Seconds of Summer

- Tour by 5 Seconds of Summer
- Promotional poster
- Location: Europe; North America; Oceania
- Associated album: Calm; 5SOS5
- Start date: 3 April 2022
- End date: 10 December 2022
- Legs: 5
- No. of shows: 68

5 Seconds of Summer concert chronology
- Meet You There Tour (2018); Take My Hand World Tour (2022); The 5 Seconds of Summer Show (2023)

The Take My Hand World Tour (previously known as the No Shame Tour) was the fourth headlining concert tour by the Australian pop rock band 5 Seconds of Summer in support of their fourth and fifth studio albums Calm (2020) and 5SOS5 (2022). The tour began on 3 April 2022 in Dublin at the 3Arena and concluded on 10 December 2022 in Sydney at the Sydney Opera House Forecourt, consisting of 68 dates in total.

Originally scheduled to begin on 11 May 2020 in Belfast, Northern Ireland, the tour was rescheduled to 2022 due to the ongoing COVID-19 pandemic.

== Background ==
Following their tour with the Chainsmokers, the band announced on 28 November 2019 that they would be touring both the United Kingdom and Europe in 2020. The North American tour dates were later announced on 31 January 2020 with The Band Camino set to be the opening act for all shows in the US, Mexico and Canada. On 5 February 2020, the band announced the release of their fourth studio album, Calm, which was released on 27 March 2020. Following the album release statement, the Australian tour dates, taking place between 27 November 2020 and 5 December 2020, were announced on 17 February 2020. The first added Sydney show sold out within hours. Due to overwhelming demand, a second Sydney show, at the Sydney Opera House Forecourt, was added to take place on 6 December 2020. On 24 February 2020, Coin was announced as the opening act for the UK dates, All Time Low for the European dates and lovelytheband for the Latin America dates. Tickets for the North American and Australian dates were released via LiveNation, on 7 February 2020 and 21 February 2020, respectively.

On 27 March 2020, the band released their fourth studio album Calm. The album was a commercial success and received generally positive reviews from critics who praised the band's artistic growth and maturity. The album charted in more than 25 countries on several charts and debuted atop the charts at number one in Australia, the UK and Scotland. The album peaked in the top ten on seventeen charts, including number two in Mexico and number four in Austria, Estonia, Ireland, New Zealand and Portugal.

Prior to the official tour announcement, in June 2019 it was revealed that, as part of the tour, the band would perform as headliners for the 2020 annual Orange Warsaw Festival in Poland, originally scheduled to take place on 5 June 2020. In March 2020, it was announced that the 2020 Orange Warsaw Festival had been cancelled, due to the ongoing COVID-19 pandemic. It was subsequently announced that the European and UK leg would be postponed to 2021.

On 26 June 2020, the band announced that the North America and Australian tour dates would be rescheduled to 2021 due to the COVID-19 pandemic. The band also announced additional shows in the United States, United Kingdom and Europe. On 16 February 2021, the band stated that the Australian dates, originally rescheduled for March 2021, would once again be postponed. However, they confirmed that they do have new rescheduled dates in negotiations that coincide with the band's tenth anniversary.

On 7 October 2021, the four members announced that the Oceania's dates would be postponed again due the COVID-19 pandemic. The band later announced an exclusive performance on 22 September 2022 at the Royal Albert Hall in London, England, in which they will perform with a live orchestra.

== Tour dates ==
List of 2022 concerts
Date	City	Country	Venue	Opening act(s)	Attendance	Revenue
3 April 2022	Dublin	Ireland	3Arena	Coin	7,766 / 7,908	$416,541
4 April 2022	Belfast	Northern Ireland	SSE Arena	Coin	4,489 / 5,000	$254,382
6 April 2022	London	England	OVO Arena Wembley	Coin	9,572 / 9,572	$506,716
8 April 2022	Cardiff	Wales	Motorpoint Arena Cardiff	Coin	5,253 / 5,253	$257,549
9 April 2022	Liverpool	England	M&S Bank Arena	Coin	5,357 / 5,357	$261,961
11 April 2022	Plymouth	England	Plymouth Pavilions	Coin	2,577 / 2,577	$125,954
12 April 2022	Birmingham	England	Utilita Arena	Coin	7,007 / 7,007	$342,379
14 April 2022	Glasgow	Scotland	OVO Hydro	Coin	7,124 / 13,871	$401,308
15 April 2022	Leeds	England	First Direct Arena	Coin	7,603 / 7,603	$365,833
18 April 2022	Düsseldorf	Germany	Mitsubishi Electric Halle Arena	Hinds	—	—
19 April 2022	Amsterdam	Netherlands	AFAS Live	Hinds	—	—
22 April 2022	Rotterdam	Netherlands	RTM Stage	Hinds	—	—
23 April 2022	Brussels	Belgium	Palais 12	Hinds	—	—
25 April 2022	Hamburg	Germany	Alsterdorfer Sporthalle	Hinds	—	—
26 April 2022	Berlin	Germany	Verti Music Hall	Hinds	—	—
28 April 2022	Kraków	Poland	Tauron Arena	Hinds	—	—
29 April 2022	Prague	Czech Republic	O2 Universum	Hinds	—	—
30 April 2022	Budapest	Hungary	Budapest Park	Hinds	—	—
2 May 2022	Zürich	Switzerland	Halle 622	Hinds	2,679 / 3,339	$195,122
3 May 2022	Vienna	Austria	Bank Austria Halle	Hinds	3,288 / 3,288	$164,202
4 May 2022	Frankfurt	Germany	Jahrhunderthalle	Hinds	—	—
6 May 2022	Ljubljana	Slovenia	Arena Stožice	Hinds	—	—
7 May 2022	Padua	Italy	Kioene Arena	Hinds	—	—
8 May 2022	Milan	Italy	Lorenzini District	Hinds	—	—
10 May 2022	Paris	France	Zénith Paris	Hinds	—	—
18 May 2022	Mexico City	Mexico	Palacio de los Deportes	Bruses	17,733 / 19,605	$842,140
20 May 2022	Monterrey	Mexico	Auditorio Citibanamex	Bruses	7,224 / 7,515	$325,001
21 May 2022	Guadalajara	Mexico	Auditorio Telmex	Bruses	8,323 / 8,401	$411,807
3 June 2022 (Note: The concert on 3 June 2022 was a part of Channel 93.3 Summer Kick Off.)	San Diego	United States	Gallagher Square	—N/a	—N/a	—N/a
4 June 2022 (Note: The concert on 4 June 2022 was a part of Wango Tango.)	Carson	United States	Dignity Health Sports Park	—N/a	—N/a	—N/a
5 June 2022 (Note: The concert on 5 June 2022 was a part of Wild 94.9 WAZZMATAZZ.)	Mountain View	United States	Shoreline Amphitheatre	—N/a	—N/a	—N/a
11 June 2022	Vancouver	Canada	Thunderbird Sports Centre	Pale Waves	5,173 / 5,173	$233,160
12 June 2022	Seattle	United States	WaMu Theatre	Pale Waves	6,124 / 6,124	$364,893
14 June 2022	Concord	United States	Concord Pavilion	Pale Waves	10,090 / 10,090	$530,057
16 June 2022	Los Angeles	United States	Hollywood Palladium	Pale Waves	7,523 / 7,523	$548,707
17 June 2022	Los Angeles	United States	Hollywood Palladium	Pale Waves	7,523 / 7,523	$548,707
18 June 2022	Irvine	United States	FivePoint Amphitheatre	Pale Waves	10,896 / 10,896	$718,686
20 June 2022	Phoenix	United States	Arizona Federal Theatre	Pale Waves	5,154 / 5,154	$377,574
22 June 2022	Denver	United States	Fillmore Auditorium	Pale Waves	—	—
24 June 2022	Austin	United States	Moody Amphitheatre	Pale Waves	4,531 / 4,531	$274,964
25 June 2022	Irving	United States	Toyota Music Factory	Pale Waves	7,861 / 7,861	$409,638
26 June 2022	The Woodlands	United States	Cynthia Woods Mitchell Pavilion	Pale Waves	—	—
30 June 2022	Nashville	United States	Ascend Amphitheater	Pale Waves	6,743 / 6,743	$356,232
1 July 2022	Atlanta	United States	Cadence Bank Amphitheatre	Pale Waves	6,552 / 6,552	$436,858
3 July 2022	Charlotte	United States	Charlotte Metro Credit Union Amphitheatre	Pale Waves	5,030 / 5,030	$283,986
5 July 2022	Washington, D.C.	United States	The Anthem	Pale Waves	6,145 / 6,145	$410,887
6 July 2022	Philadelphia	United States	Skyline Stage at the Mann	Pale Waves	6,918 / 6,918	$456,824
8 July 2022	Uncasville	United States	Mohegan Sun Arena	Pale Waves	7,432 / 7,432	$322,623
9 July 2022	Boston	United States	Leader Bank Pavilion	Pale Waves	5,156 / 5,156	$402,282
10 July 2022	Holmdel	United States	PNC Bank Arts Center	Pale Waves	14,167 / 14,167	$819,160
12 July 2022	New York City	United States	Pier 17	Pale Waves	7,252 / 7,252	$578,821
13 July 2022	New York City	United States	Pier 17	Pale Waves	7,252 / 7,252	$578,821
15 July 2022	Indianapolis	United States	Farm Bureau Insurance Lawn	Pale Waves	6,088 / 6,088	$347,834
16 July 2022	Chicago	United States	Huntington Bank Pavilion	Pale Waves	9,240 / 9,240	$528,053
18 July 2022	Cincinnati	United States	ICON Music Center	Pale Waves	4,169 / 4,169	$270,778
20 July 2022 (Note: This concert was originally scheduled to take place on 23 August 2020, then on 5 June 2021, but was rescheduled due to the coronavirus pandemic.)	Toronto	Canada	Budweiser Stage	Pale Waves	15,258 / 15,258	$591,377
21 July 2022 (Note: This concert was originally scheduled to take place on 22 August 2020, then on 6 June 2021, but was rescheduled due to the coronavirus pandemic.)	Sterling Heights	United States	Michigan Lottery Amphitheatre	Pale Waves	7,591 / 7,591	$475,796
23 July 2022 (Note: This concert was originally scheduled to take place on 25 August 2020, then on 19 June 2021, but was rescheduled due to the coronavirus pandemic.)	Minneapolis	United States	Minneapolis Armory	Pale Waves	6,590 / 6,590	$410,375
24 July 2022	Maryland Heights	United States	St. Louis Music Park	Pale Waves	4,483 / 4,483	$261,860
26 July 2022 (Note: This concert was originally scheduled to take place on 28 June 2022 but was rescheduled due to concerns for band member Ashton Irwin's health.)	Rogers	United States	Walmart Arkansas Music Pavilion	Pale Waves	12,528 / 12,528	$344,112
22 September 2022	London	England	Royal Albert Hall	—N/a	—	—
30 November 2022	Perth	Australia	HBF Stadium	May-a	—	—
2 December 2022	Brisbane	Australia	Riverstage	May-a	—	—
4 December 2022	Melbourne	Australia	Sidney Myer Music Bowl	May-a	—	—
6 December 2022	Gold Coast	Australia	Home of the Arts	May-a	—	—
7 December 2022	Newcastle	Australia	Bar on the Hill	May-a	—	—
9 December 2022	Sydney	Australia	Sydney Opera House Forecourt	May-a	—	—
10 December 2022	Sydney	Australia	Sydney Opera House Forecourt	May-a	—	—
Total					284,689 / 294,990 (96%)	$15,626,432

== Cancelled shows ==
List of cancelled concerts, showing date, city, country, venue and reason for postponement
Date	City	Country	Venue	Reason
5 June 2020 (Note: This concert was part of Orange Warsaw Festival.)	Warsaw	Poland	Służewiec	COVID-19 pandemic
11 June 2020	Copenhagen	Denmark	Royal Arena	COVID-19 pandemic
12 June 2020	Stockholm	Sweden	Annexet	COVID-19 pandemic
13 June 2020	Oslo	Norway	Oslo Spektrum	COVID-19 pandemic
18 June 2020 (Note: This concert was part of Caribana Festival.)	Crans-près-Céligny	Switzerland	Lake Léman	COVID-19 pandemic
19 June 2020 (Note: This concert was part of Pinkpop Festival.)	Landgraaf	Netherlands	Megaland	COVID-19 pandemic
20 June 2020 (Note: This concert was part of Werchter Boutique.)	Werchter	Belgium	Rock Werchter	COVID-19 pandemic
3 September 2020	Gilford	United States	Bank of New Hampshire Pavilion	COVID-19 pandemic
6 September 2020 (Note: This concert was part of Great Allentown Fair.)	Allentown	United States	Allentown Fairgrounds	COVID-19 pandemic
10 September 2020	Jacksonville	United States	Daily's Place	COVID-19 pandemic
4 May 2021 (Note: This concert was originally scheduled to take place on 26 May 2020, but was rescheduled due to the coronavirus pandemic.)	Munich	Germany	Zenith	COVID-19 pandemic
26 June 2022 (Note: This concert was started but was canceled partway through when drummer Ashton Irwin was hospitalized for extreme heat exhaustion.)	The Woodlands	United States	Cynthia Woods Mitchell Pavilion	Heat exhaustion

== Personnel ==
- Luke Hemmings – lead vocals, rhythm guitar, piano
- Michael Clifford – lead guitar, vocals, piano
- Calum Hood – bass guitar, keyboard, vocals
- Ashton Irwin – drums, percussion, vocals
