= Want You Back (5 Seconds of Summer song) =

Single by 5 Seconds of Summer

from the album Youngblood
- Released: 22 February 2018
- Genre: Pop
- Length: 2:53
- Label: Capitol
- Songwriters: Calum Hood; Asia Whiteacre; Andrew Goldstein; Jacob Kasher Hindlin; Ashton Irwin; Luke Hemmings; Steve Mac
- Producers: Andrew Wells; Andrew Goldstein

5 Seconds of Summer singles chronology
"Girls Talk Boys" (2016)	"Want You Back" (2018)	"Youngblood" (2018)

Music video
- "Want You Back" on YouTube

"Want You Back" is a song recorded by Australian pop rock band 5 Seconds of Summer. It was written by Calum Hood, Asia Whiteacre, Jacob Kasher Hindlin, Ashton Irwin, Luke Hemmings, Steve Mac and Andrew Goldstein, with production handled by Goldstein and Andrew Wells. The song was released via Capitol Records on 22 February 2018, as the lead single from their third studio album, Youngblood (2018).

== Background and release ==
Guitarist Michael Clifford first opened up about the third album and the upcoming single in an interview with Billboard in December 2017. He admitted: "We're at a point now where we're almost ready to put out our first single," as he promised that fans could expect it "really, really early in the new year".

On 16 February 2018, the band posted a black and white picture featuring all members on Twitter, captioning it "Behind The Scenes 2018." They shared another tweet with the hashtag "#5SOS3ISCOMING" shortly afterwards, hinting at new releases. They also teased a few lyrics from the song and posted a GIF which says "We Want You Back". The song was officially announced on 19 February 2018, along with its release date, cover art, and a brief audio snippet. The song was released alongside the announcement of their worldwide promotional 5SOS III Tour dates.

Drummer Ashton Irwin said of the song in an interview with Beats 1: "'Want You Back' articulates the band we were, we are now, and what we're gonna be, that's why I like it and that's why we picked it. We also made it with close friends like we've got Andrew Goldstein who we literally see every week. We party together, we confess our sorrows and happiness. We speak to this man everyday [sic?]." The band told news.com.au that they are "super nervous" about the comeback song which will introduce their third album.

== Critical reception ==
Madeline Roth of MTV News stated that the song "marks a huge departure from the band's raucous pop-punk roots". She found the band "opting for a slick, more polished pop sound on the new tune, which finds them reminiscing about an ex and wondering what went wrong". Althea Legaspi of Rolling Stone regarded it as a "pop-flavored track reflects on a lost love and captures the yearning that often follows a breakup". Hugh McIntyre of Forbes found the song "surprisingly slick, especially for a band that has pushed a narrative of being rowdy rock boys", and he noticed that the song was "more mature".

Mike Wass of Idolator wrote that the band have abandoned "the pop/punk of their first two albums and dive head-first into slick, radio-friendly pop with a rhythmic edge". Rania Aniftos of Billboard deemed it an "apologetic pop track" and a "synth-y upbeat tune". Nicole Mastrogiannis of iHeartRadio opined that it "takes a step back from 5SOS's signature pop/punk vibes" and "playing up the guys' pop side a bit more".

== Live performances ==
On 11 April 2018, the band performed the song live on The Tonight Show Starring Jimmy Fallon. They also performed the single during the fourteenth season of The Voice on 8 May 2018.

== Music video ==
The official music video was released on 27 March 2018. It features the members of the band performing in a colorful one-room set, depicting a scenario where the rules of gravity does not apply. The furniture can be seen fixed to the walls and ceiling as the band members remain on the ground while singing and playing their instruments. In some shots, they appear to be walking and sitting on the walls and ceiling. The video shows mostly full-room shots of the set and some closeup shots of the band members. The closeup shots of the band members' faces are often opaquely overlaid on the full-room shots.

== Track listing ==
- Digital download
1. "Want You Back" – 2:53
- Digital download – acoustic
1. "Want You Back" (acoustic) – 2:39
- Digital download – Tritonal remix
1. "Want You Back" (Tritonal remix) – 3:26

== Credits and personnel ==
Credits adapted from Tidal.

5 Seconds of Summer

- Luke Hemmings – lead vocals, rhythm guitar
- Michael Clifford – lead guitar, backing vocals
- Calum Hood – bass guitar, backing vocals
- Ashton Irwin – percussion, backing vocals

Additional musicians

- Asia Whiteacre – composition
- Andrew Goldstein – composition, production, engineering, vocals, keyboard, editing, guitar, programming, additional vocals
- Jacob Kasher Hindlin – composition
- Steve Mac – composition
- Andrew Wells – production, engineering, keyboard, editing, guitar, programming

Technical personnel

- Chris Gehringer – master engineering
- Michael Freeman – mixing assistance
- Spike Stent – mixing

== Charts ==
=== Weekly charts ===
Chart (2018)	Peak position
Australia (ARIA)	32
Austria (Ö3 Austria Top 40)	50
Belgium (Ultratip Bubbling Under Flanders)	4
Belgium (Ultratip Bubbling Under Wallonia)	5
Canada Hot 100 (Billboard)	57
Czech Republic Airplay (ČNS IFPI)	37
Czech Republic Singles Digital (ČNS IFPI)	54
Germany (GfK)	82
Greece (IFPI)	54
Hungary (Rádiós Top 40)	36
Hungary (Single Top 40)	30
Hungary (Stream Top 40)	29
Ireland (IRMA)	26
Italy (FIMI)	44
Mexico Ingles Airplay (Billboard)	17
New Zealand Heatseekers (RMNZ)	1
Portugal (AFP)	57
Scottish Singles Sales (Official Charts)	16
Slovakia Singles Digital (ČNS IFPI)	55
Sweden (Sverigetopplistan)	54
Switzerland (Schweizer Hitparade)	56
UK Singles (Official Charts)	22
US Billboard Hot 100	61
US Pop Airplay (Billboard)	23

=== Year-end charts ===
Chart (2018)	Position
Australian Artists (ARIA)	40
Hungary (Rádiós Top 40)	90

== Certifications ==
Certifications for "Want You Back"
Region	Certification	Certified units/sales
Australia (ARIA)	Platinum	70,000^{‡}
Brazil (Pro-Música Brasil)	Platinum	40,000^{‡}
Canada (Music Canada)	Gold	40,000^{‡}
New Zealand (RMNZ)	Gold	15,000^{‡}
United Kingdom (BPI)	Silver	200,000^{‡}
United States (RIAA)	Gold	500,000^{‡}
^{‡} Sales+streaming figures based on certification alone.
