= Calm (album) =

Studio album by 5 Seconds of Summer
- Released: 27 March 2020
- Genres: Pop rock; pop; new wave; rock
- Length: 39:30
- Label: Interscope
- Producers: Louis Bell; Charlie Puth; Happy Perez; Andrew Watt; Matthew Pauling; Dre Moon; Oscar Gorres; Benny Blanco

5 Seconds of Summer chronology
Meet You There Tour Live (2018)	Calm (2020)	5SOS5 (2022)

Singles from Calm
- 1. "Easier" Released: 23 May 2019; 2. "Teeth" Released: 21 August 2019; 3. "No Shame" Released: 5 February 2020; 4. "Old Me" Released: 6 March 2020; 5. "Wildflower" Released: 27 March 2020

Calm (stylised as C A L M, an acronym of the first letters of the band members' names, Calum, Ashton, Luke and Michael) is the fourth studio album by Australian pop rock band 5 Seconds of Summer, released on 27 March 2020. The album was a commercial success and received positive reviews from critics who praised the band's lyrical growth and maturity. Due to a shipping error, approximately 11,000 copies of the album were released early in the US, subsequently causing the album to chart a week before it was due.

With Calm earning the band their fourth consecutive number one in their home country, 5 Seconds of Summer became the second Australian band in history to have their first four full-length studio albums debut at number one on the ARIA albums chart.

At the ARIA Music Awards of 2020, the album was nominated for Best Group. Billboard magazine named the album as one of The 25 Best Pop Albums of 2020.

== Promotion ==
The promotion of the album was heavily limited by the COVID-19 pandemic and the stay-at-home order, which forced the band to cancel all promotional appearances and concerts. Initially having promotional plans to "go all over the world", the band members instead did a number of radio and TV interviews over videocall and resorted to interacting with fans online via live streams and Q&As on Twitter.

On 26 March 2020, Hemmings performed an acoustic version of "Old Me" on the "At Home Edition" of The Tonight Show Starring Jimmy Fallon.

Prior to the album's release, the band released a four-track Relaxation remix collection in collaboration with Calm, a meditation app. The collection consists of four remixes, one produced by each member and producer Matt Pauling. The compilation includes the reproduction of two singles, with guitarist Michael Clifford remixing the album's lead single "Easier", and bassist Calum Hood remixing the album's fourth single, "Old Me". Non-singles included in the collection are, "Red Desert", remixed by drummer Ashton Irwin, and "Best Years", remixed by lead vocalist Luke Hemmings.

To promote the album, the band embarked on their headlining tour, the Take My Hand World Tour, in 2022.

== Background ==
On 23 May 2019, 5 Seconds of Summer released the album's lead single, "Easier." In an interview with the Rolling Stone, the band stated that the track was "the first taste of their fourth album". "Easier" charted in multiple countries on both weekly and year-end charts, with peaks at number twelve in Australia and number twelve on the US Mainstream Top 40. In 2019, "Easier" was nominated for the ARIA Song of the Year Award. Billboard magazine included the song on their 100 Best Songs of 2019 list at number 79.

In a May 2019 Ryan Seacrest interview, drummer Ashton Irwin commented on the musical direction of the then upcoming album, explaining, "[the band] had to agree to continue pursuing something [that was] fantastic and new [...] That's why the sound has changed".

On 21 August 2019, the band released the album's second single, "Teeth". The track charted in several countries, including peaks at number fifteen in Australia, and number twenty-one on the US Mainstream Top 40. In 2020, "Teeth" was nominated for the prestigious APRA Song of the Year award. Teeth has also won the Song of the Year at the 2020 ARIA awards.

The album was announced on the band's social media on 5 February 2020. The announcement preceded the band's confirmation that they would embark on their fifth world arena tour in 2020. The band revealed the album's title, Calm, was an acronym created from the first letters of each band member's name, Calum, Ashton, Luke and Michael. Hemmings referred to the album name as "a nod to [the band's] fans", elaborating: "[The fans] been using that acronym for a long time. It kind of just sums up [that] we're a little bit older and a little bit wiser."

== Music and composition ==
=== Conception ===
The band revealed they were inspired by industrial music whilst working on the album, allowing them to establish the "rhythm side" of the album's production. Drummer Ashton Irwin further explained: "As far as sonic inspirations go, [the band] always [tries to] incorporate some of what everyone is actually listening to so it's a more genuine and influenced record that [the band] can speak on". Lead vocalist Luke Hemmings elaborated: "The last album was pretty heavy and dark [...] Whereas this one has that side of it with the lighter side of life and moving forward rather than being stuck in one place."

The band's bassist Calum Hood noted: "I think everyone had something to say with this album, in terms of their coming of age – in really reflecting on the people who we were and how things shaped us, and who we want to become in the future." He further described the album as "pretty chaotic at times".

=== Songs ===
Amelia Parreira of Riff magazine summarized the album, saying 5 Seconds of Summer bring forth a "new musical density and electrifying nuance on Calm, with a misleading name for a body of work that is anything but sonically mellow".

The album's opening track, the "groovy, anthemic" "Red Desert" hinges on psychedelia, with the "gospel-like vocals" of Luke Hemmings. The song contains light bass vibration from bassist Calum Hood. The song's theme is about "contentment and falling in love", which Parreira noted sets the album's tone. Track 2, "No Shame", features a "retro '80s pop vibe", layered with "explosive instrumentals over meaningful lyrics and raw stories". Hemmings delivers high notes on the song, which consists of a "Beach Boys-like vocal chant before a rise in bass and synth undertones set a romantic tone on the verses". "Old Me" lyrically reflects on past mistakes, and is a high-energy "dance anthem". "Easier" is a synth-heavy new wave song, released as the album's lead single, with conversational tone and "mellow" electro instrumentation. Second single "Teeth", is a grungy, rock-tinged song, with an energetic, catchy chorus. "Wildflower" is a soft rock song with a gospel-like vocal intro. "Best Years" moves at a slower pace, albeit containing a "danceable vibe". The piano-led "Lover of Mine" features intertwining guitar strumming patterns and "powerful vocal styles". "Thin White Lies" is an "angst-ridden" dance-esque track, with "strong electric beats". The album concludes with the slow-burner "Lonely Heart" and the self-reflective "High", both ballads, with slightly energetic production, marking a "calm end" to the album.

== Critical reception ==
Professional ratings
Aggregate scores
Source	Rating
Metacritic	70/100
Review scores
Source	Rating
AllMusic	4/5 stars
No Ripcord	6/10 stars
Clash	8/10
The Line of Best Fit	8/10

At Metacritic, which assigns a normalised rating out of 100 to reviews from mainstream publications, Calm received an average score of 70, based on five reviews, indicating "generally favorable reviews". Album of the Year assessed the critical consensus as a 67 out of 100.

Billboard praised the album, calling it "an accomplished exploration of the group's expanding palette" and praised the band for their ability to "expertly synthesize their influences into fresh-feeling gems". A separate Billboard critic labelled the album as having "out-of-the-box thinking" and being the "group's most musically complex project yet." Billboard elaborated: "The album's 12 tracks intertwine anthemic harmonies [...] with thumping beats and basslines [...] grinding electric guitar [...] and swirling production."

Malvika Padin of Gigwise gave the album a positive review, writing: "despite that niggling urge to skip the odd mediocre track, the desire to play beauties like 'High' on loop wins in the end and Calm stands on a pedestal of near-perfection pop." Padin noted the album was "split into two distinct, yet cohesive, sections of music that are authentically 5SOS" and labeled the album as "a look into the journey of four young boys growing up and getting pulled into the addictive power of fame". A No Ripcord music critic wrote "CALM is occasionally inspired, sometimes incredibly stupid, and most of all: surprisingly fine." Matt Collar, writing for AllMusic, called the album "the sound of a band whose influences have continued to evolve right along with them and their fans" while naming the group "a sophisticated pop outfit." Zoya Raza-Sheikh of Clash opined that their latest effort was "by no means perfect, but the album is a testament to their growth." Sophia Simon-Bashall from The Line of Best Fit gave the album a positive review, stating that "Australia's premier boy-band prove themselves worthy pop stars on their next step forward." Bashall continued, stating that Calm is "a perfect pop record, from start to finish – there's not a single filler track, each is distinctive and shows off the band's impressive range." Writing for the South China Morning Post, Chris Gillett named Calm as "a near-faultless pop record" while writing that "5SOS have really come into their own here, but what's most exciting is that they still have room to grow."

In a more mixed review, Ethan Gordon of No Ripcord classified the record as "occasionally inspired, sometimes incredibly stupid, and most of all: surprisingly fine" while calling the two lead singles, "Easier" and "Teeth" "pretty terrible" but added that "they're surrounded by a handful of legitimately great moments and songs." Writing for The Young Folks, Ryan Feyre felt like the group "walked a fine line between multi-dimensional edginess and radio-friendly hodgepodge" with the album and called it as a whole "just blandness", but specifically singled out "Best Years" and "Lover of Mine" as two of the record's highlights.

In June 2020, Billboard magazine named the album as one of the Top 50 Best Albums of 2020 So Far. Billboard magazine named the album as one of The 25 Best Pop Albums of 2020.

== Commercial performance ==
Calm charted in more than 25 countries on several charts, and debuted atop the charts at number one in Australia, the UK and Scotland. The album peaked in the top 10 on 17 charts, including number two in Mexico and number four in Austria, Estonia, Ireland, New Zealand and Portugal.

Calm debuted atop the Australian ARIA Albums Chart, thus becoming the band's fourth consecutive album to debut at number-one in their home country and making them the second Australian band in history to have their first four full-length studio albums debut at number one on the ARIA albums chart. The album also debuted atop the UK Albums Chart, earning first week sales of 34,940 units and becoming their second number-one album in the country and first since the release of Sounds Good Feels Good. Calm remains the best-selling cassette album of 2020 in the UK.

A shipping error caused 11,000 copies to be released early in the US, causing Calm to debut a week early at number 62 on the Billboard 200, before ascending to number two in its second week, marking the band's fifth top 10 album. In its second week, it earned 133,000 album-equivalent unit. It was kept from the number-one spot by The Weeknd's After Hours by 5,000 units. The low chart position because of mishandled shipments being accidentally released a week early, sparked outrage among the band's fans with hashtags such as #BillboardCountThe10k trending on Twitter and the creation of a petition with more than 50,000 signatures to count the mishandled shipments. Several radio stations like Sirius XM Hits 1 and radio hosts like Elvis Duran, also voiced their support for the band either on-air or on Twitter. However, according to Billboard, their policy is to reflect album sale activity in the tracking week that the paying customer receives an album.

== Singles ==
The album's lead single, "Easier", was released via Interscope on 23 May 2019. The song charted in several countries on both weekly and year-end charts and included peaks at number twelve in Australia, number twelve in the US Mainstream Top 40 and number twenty-seven in the UK. "Easier" was nominated for the ARIA 2019 Song of the Year Award. Billboard magazine included the song on their 100 Best Songs of 2019 list at number 79.

The album's follow-up single, "Teeth", included in Season 3 of the Netflix series 13 Reasons Why, was released on 21 August 2019. The song charted in several countries and included peaks at number fifteen in Australia, and number twenty-one in the US Mainstream Top 40 In 2020, the song was nominated for the prestigious Song of the Year award at the APRA Music Awards of 2020.

On 5 February 2020, the band announced their fourth studio album Calm, which was set to be released on 27 March 2020, and released "No Shame", the third single off the album, at the same time.

On 21 February 2020, the band released "Old Me" originally as a promotional single, before releasing it to radio as the album's fourth single on 6 March. Although the song was given very minimal promotion, it charted in a number of countries, including a peak at number thirty-nine in Australia and number twenty-eight on the US Mainstream Top 40.

On 25 March 2020, the band released "Wildflower" as the second promotional single, before releasing it to radio as the album's fifth and final single on 17 April. With song promotion halted due to the ongoing COVID-19 pandemic, the song peaked at number twelve on the Australian Artists chart.

== Track listing ==
Calm track listing
No.	Title	Writer(s)	Producer(s)	Length
1.	"Red Desert"	Calum Hood; Luke Hemmings; Ashton Irwin; Michael Clifford; Matthew Pauling	Matthew Pauling	3:49
2.	"No Shame"	Hood; Hemmings; Irwin; Clifford; Alexandra Tamposi; Andrew Wotman; Nathan Perez; Donna Lewis	Andrew Watt; Happy Perez	3:10
3.	"Old Me"	Hemmings; Irwin; Tamposi; Wotman; William Walsh; Louis Bell; Brian Lee; Andre Proctor	Watt; Bell; Dre Moon	3:04
4.	"Easier"	Charlie Puth; Ryan Tedder; Tamposi; Wotman; Bell	Puth; Bell; Watt	2:37
5.	"Teeth"	Hemmings; Irwin; Tedder; Tamposi; Wotman; Bell; Bernard Sumner; Peter Hook; Stephen Morris; Gillian Gilbert; Carl Sturken; Evan Rogers	Watt; Bell	3:24
6.	"Wildflower"	Hood; Irwin; Clifford; Geoff Warburton; Oscar Gorres; Rami Yacoub	Gorres	3:40
7.	"Best Years"	Hemmings; Tedder; Tamposi; Wotman; Perez	Watt; Perez; Benny Blanco	3:10
8.	"Not in the Same Way"	Irwin; Hemmings; Clifford; Tamposi; Wotman; Benjamin Levin; Joshua Coleman	Watt; Blanco	3:40
9.	"Lover of Mine"	Irwin; Hemmings; Sierra Deaton; Tamposi; Wotman; Perez	Watt; Perez	3:26
10.	"Thin White Lies"	Hood; Hemmings; Irwin; Clifford; Tamposi; Wotman; Perez; Carter Lang	Watt; Perez	3:02
11.	"Lonely Heart"	Hood; Hemmings; Irwin; Clifford; Pauling	Pauling	3:24
12.	"High"	Hood; Irwin; Hemmings; Clifford; Tamposi; Wotman; Bell	Watt; Bell	2:58
Total length:				39:30

Calm (PLUS1) and digital reissue track listing
No.	Title	Writer(s)	Length
13.	"Kill My Time"	Julian Bunetta; John Ryan; Hemmings; Clifford	3:55
Total length:			43:19

=== Notes ===
- International Deluxe and Japanese editions include the "Live from the Vault" versions of "Easier", "Teeth", and "No Shame".
- Each band member's individual picture disc edition includes a specific "Calm Remix" as a bonus track: Calum's features "Old Me", Ashton's features "Red Desert", Luke's features "Best Years", and Michael's features "Easier".
- Japanese deluxe edition includes a bonus DVD featuring the music videos and behind-the-scenes footage for "Easier" and "Teeth", alongside a video comment from the band.
- "Teeth" features guitar riffs played by Tom Morello of Rage Against the Machine.

=== Samples ===
- "Teeth" samples "Shut Up and Drive" performed by Rihanna, which in turn, contains excerpts from "Blue Monday" performed by New Order.

== Personnel ==
Credits adapted from the liner notes of Calm and Tidal.

5 Seconds of Summer

- Luke Hemmings – lead vocals, rhythm guitar, backing vocals (track 6)
- Michael Clifford – lead guitar, backing vocals
- Calum Hood – bass, backing vocals, lead vocals (track 6)
- Ashton Irwin – drums, percussion, backing vocals

Additional musicians

- Ali Tamposi – background vocals (track 2, 3, 5, 7–10, 12)
- Andrew Watt – background vocals, guitar(track 2–5, 7–10, 12), keyboards (track 2–5, 8–10, 12), bass (track 5), drums (track 7)
- Benny Blanco – keyboards (track 8)
- Happy Perez – guitar (track 7, 9, 10)
- Tom Morello – guitar (track 5)
- Charlie Puth – keyboards (track 4)
- Geoff Warburton – background vocals (track 6)
- Louis Bell – keyboards (track 4, 5)
- Oscar Görres – keyboards (track 6), percussion (track 6)

Production

- Andrew Watt – production (track 2–5), programming (track 2–5, 7–9, 12)
- Happy Perez – production (track 2), programming (track 2, 7, 9)
- Dre Moon – production (track 3), programming (track 3)
- Louis Bell – production (track 3, 4, 5), programming (track 3–5, 12)
- Charlie Puth – production (track 4), programming (track 4)
- Oscar Görres – production (track 6), programming (track 6)
- Benny Blanco – programming (track 8)
- Adam Schoeller – engineering (track 1, 11)
- Matthew Pauling – production (track 1), engineering (track 1, 11)
- Dave Kutch – master engineering (track 1–3, 5–9, 11, 12)
- Alan Moulder – engineering (track 2), mixing (track 2)
- Caesar Edmunds – engineering (track 2)
- Paul Lamalfa – engineering (track 2–5, 7–10)
- Tom Herbert – engineering (track 2), assistant mixing (track 2)
- Chris Galland – engineering (track 3, 5, 8, 9, 12)
- Michael Freeman – engineering (track 7, 10, 12)
- Geoff Swan – engineering (track 7, 10, 12)
- Spike Stent – mixing (track 1, 6, 7, 11, 12)
- Manny Marroquin – mixing (track 3, 4, 5, 8, 9)
- Matt Wolach – assistant mixing (track 1, 6, 11)

Design

- Andy Deluca – creative director
- Sarah Eiseman – assistant creative director

== Charts ==
=== Weekly charts ===
Weekly chart performance for Calm
Chart (2020)	Peak position
Australian Albums (ARIA)	1
Austrian Albums (Ö3 Austria)	4
Belgian Albums (Ultratop Flanders)	7
Belgian Albums (Ultratop Wallonia)	38
Canadian Albums (Billboard)	7
Czech Albums (ČNS IFPI)	81
Danish Albums (Hitlisten)	22
Dutch Albums (Album Top 100)	5
Estonian Albums (Eesti Tipp-40)	4
Finnish Albums (Suomen virallinen lista)	23
French Albums (SNEP)	42
German Albums (Offizielle Top 100)	7
Hungarian Albums (MAHASZ)	8
Irish Albums (Official Charts)	4
Italian Albums (FIMI)	25
Japan Hot Albums (Billboard Japan)	66
Japanese Albums (Oricon)	77
Lithuanian Albums (AGATA)	6
Mexican Albums (AMPROFON)	2
New Zealand Albums (RMNZ)	4
Norwegian Albums (VG-lista)	15
Polish Albums (ZPAV)	7
Portuguese Albums (AFP)	4
Scottish Albums (Official Charts)	1
Slovak Albums (ČNS IFPI)	82
Swedish Albums (Sverigetopplistan)	26
Swiss Albums (Schweizer Hitparade)	13
UK Albums (Official Charts)	1
US Billboard 200	2

=== Year-end charts ===
2020 year-end chart performance for Calm
Chart (2020)	Position
Australian Albums (ARIA)	35
Belgian Albums (Ultratop Flanders)	175
US Billboard 200	188

== Certifications ==
Certifications for Calm
Region	Certification	Certified units/sales
Australia (ARIA)	Gold	35,000^{‡}
Denmark (IFPI Danmark)	Gold	10,000^{‡}
New Zealand (RMNZ)	Gold	7,500^{‡}
Poland (ZPAV)	Platinum	20,000^{‡}
United Kingdom (BPI)	Gold	100,000^{‡}
^{‡} Sales+streaming figures based on certification alone.

== See also ==
- List of number-one albums of 2020 (Australia)
