= No Shame (5 Seconds of Summer song) =

Single by 5 Seconds of Summer

from the album Calm
- Released: 5 February 2020
- Genre: New wave
- Length: 3:10
- Label: Interscope; Polydor
- Songwriters: Calum Hood; Luke Hemmings; Ashton Irwin; Michael Clifford; Alexandra Tamposi; Andrew Wotman; Nathan Perez; Donna Lewis
- Producers: Andrew Watt; Happy Perez

5 Seconds of Summer singles chronology
"Teeth" (2019)	"No Shame" (2020)	"Old Me" (2020)

Music video
- "No Shame" on YouTube

"No Shame" is a song by Australian pop rock band 5 Seconds of Summer, released on 5 February 2020 as the third single from the band's fourth studio album Calm. The song was written by Calum Hood, Luke Hemmings, Ashton Irwin, Michael Clifford, Alexandra Tamposi, Andrew Wotman, Nathan Perez and Donna Lewis.

== Music video ==
An accompanying music video for "No Shame" was released on YouTube on 7 February 2020 and has 19 million views as of March 2021. It was directed by Hannah Lux Davis.

The band is shown performing in a cheetah-print performance box. In between, are shots of the individual members doing an activity linked to a lyric. Calum Hood is shown with a wife and two children. He gives expensive presents to her and they are seen posing for pictures in front of a neatly trimmed lawn. Luke Hemmings's scene comes next. The other band members and crying relatives are attending his funeral. He later arrives clothed in black and it is revealed he faked his own death. Michael Clifford and a group of friends get into an accident. They immediately take selfies of the incident, presumably to post on social media. Ashton Irwin is depicted as a kind of plastic surgeon who is performing an operation on a woman. At the end, all four band performing members remove masks to reveal older men underneath at the wrap of the filming.

== Charts ==
Chart (2020)	Peak position
Australia (ARIA)	63
Belgium (Ultratip Bubbling Under Flanders)	33
Czech Republic Airplay (ČNS IFPI)	16
Ireland (IRMA)	56
New Zealand Hot Singles (RMNZ)	6
Poland Airplay (ZPAV)	59
Portugal (AFP)	147
Scotland Singles (Official Charts)	94
Slovakia Airplay (ČNS IFPI)	77
UK Singles (Official Charts)	68
US Bubbling Under Hot 100 (Billboard)	12
Venezuela Anglo (Record Report)	9
Venezuela Pop (Record Report)	26

== Certifications ==
Certifications for "No Shame"
Region	Certification	Certified units/sales
Australia (ARIA)	Gold	35,000^{‡}
^{‡} Sales+streaming figures based on certification alone.

== Release history ==
Region	Date	Format	Label	Ref.
Various	5 February 2020	Digital download streaming	Interscope Polydor	
Italy	21 February 2020	Contemporary hit radio	Universal	
