= Easier (5 Seconds of Summer song) =

2019 single by 5 Seconds of Summer

Single by 5 Seconds of Summer

from the album Calm
- Released: 23 May 2019
- Recorded: 2019
- Genre: New wave; electro; pop rock
- Length: 2:38
- Label: Interscope
- Songwriters: Louis Bell; Charlie Puth; Ali Tamposi; Ryan Tedder; Andrew Watt
- Producers: Charlie Puth; Louis Bell; Andrew Watt

5 Seconds of Summer singles chronology
"Who Do You Love" (2019)	"Easier" (2019)	"Teeth" (2019)

Music video
- "Easier" on YouTube

"Easier" is a song by Australian pop rock band 5 Seconds of Summer, released on 23 May 2019 through Interscope Records as both the lead single from their fourth studio album Calm (2020) and their first release through the label. Billboard magazine included the song on their 100 Best Songs of 2019 list at number 79. At the 2019 ARIA Music Awards, the song earned them a nomination for the ARIA Award for Best Group.

Besides the original version, the band has also released an alternate version and two remixes of the song; on 5 July 2019, a version called "Easier – Live from the Vault" was released on YouTube with an accompanying music video. It was later made available on streaming services and for digital download as well. A week later, on 12 July 2019, a remix by Seeb was released, and on 13 August 2019, a remix with Charlie Puth was released.

== Promotion ==
5 Seconds of Summer posted clips on social media leading up to the announcement, posting teasers from the song's upcoming music video along with its name and release date.

== Composition ==
Rolling Stone described the song as "dark" and noted the inspiration from "synth-heavy groups of the Eighties and Nineties like Depeche Mode and Tears for Fears and, more specifically, Nine Inch Nails' "Closer". Billboard noted that "the relatably heart-rending sentiment is elevated by lead singer Luke Hemmings' impassioned vocals, from the murmuring verses to the falsetto on the chorus".

== Music video ==
The music video, directed by Grant Singer, was released the same day as the single. In the video, "Hemmings, wearing a leather ensemble and glitter eyeshadow, sings chained by the wrists to the roof of a blue-lit cave while guitarist Michael Clifford, bassist Calum Hood and drummer Ashton Irwin rock out in front of the candle-studded backdrop [...] In addition to the cave setting, the video also features a striking seductress and haunting scenes of the bandmates submerged in on orange-lit pool and individually strolling down a long hallway in which their headshots are set ablaze."

The blue lighting prominent throughout the video follows the aesthetic of the single's artwork. Four symbols, representing each member, were used in the teasers for the song and also appear in the video as tattoos along the female dancer's spine as well as on a burning poster at the end.

As of January 2026, the video has over 71 million views.

== Track listing ==
Digital download
No.	Title	Length
1.	"Easier"	2:37

Digital download
No.	Title	Length
1.	"Easier" (SeeB Remix)	2:45

Digital download
No.	Title	Length
1.	"Easier" (Live from The Vault)	3:26

== Awards and nominations ==
Year	Organisation	Nominated	Result	Ref.
2019	MTV Video Music Awards	Best Pop	Nominated	
2019	ARIA Awards	Best Group	Nominated	
2020	BMI Awards	Best Performing Song	Won	

== Charts ==
=== Weekly charts ===
Chart (2019)	Peak position
Australia (ARIA)	12
Austria (Ö3 Austria Top 40)	58
Belgium (Ultratop 50 Flanders)	48
Canada Hot 100 (Billboard)	37
China Airplay/FL (Billboard)	8
Czech Republic Singles Digital (ČNS IFPI)	45
Denmark (Tracklisten)	28
Estonia (Eesti Ekspress)	18
Greece (IFPI)	21
Hungary (Stream Top 40)	8
Ireland (IRMA)	25
Italy (FIMI)	95
Malaysia (RIM)	16
Mexico Ingles Airplay (Billboard)	32
Netherlands (Dutch Top 40)	18
Netherlands (Single Top 100)	66
New Zealand (Recorded Music NZ)	16
Norway (VG-lista)	38
Portugal (AFP)	52
Russia Top Radio Hits (Tophit)	10
Scotland Singles (Official Charts)	39
Singapore (RIAS)	27
Slovakia Singles Digital (ČNS IFPI)	29
Sweden (Sverigetopplistan)	74
Switzerland (Schweizer Hitparade)	66
UK Singles (Official Charts)	27
Ukraine Airplay (TopHit)	75
US Billboard Hot 100	48
US Pop Airplay (Billboard)	12
US Rolling Stone Top 100	52
Venezuela Anglo (Record Report)	43

=== Year-end charts ===
Chart (2019)	Position
Australia (ARIA)	89
Guatemala Anglo (Monitor Latino)	90
Netherlands (Dutch Top 40)	98
US Mainstream Top 40 (Billboard)	35
Venezuela Anglo (Monitor Latino)	89

== Certifications ==
Region	Certification	Certified units/sales
Australia (ARIA)	3× Platinum	210,000^{‡}
Brazil (Pro-Música Brasil)	2× Platinum	80,000^{‡}
Canada (Music Canada)	Platinum	80,000^{‡}
Denmark (IFPI Danmark)	Gold	45,000^{‡}
New Zealand (RMNZ)	Platinum	30,000^{‡}
Poland (ZPAV)	Platinum	50,000^{‡}
Portugal (AFP)	Gold	5,000^{‡}
United Kingdom (BPI)	Gold	400,000^{‡}
United States (RIAA)	Platinum	1,000,000^{‡}
^{‡} Sales+streaming figures based on certification alone.

== Charlie Puth remix ==
"Easier (Remix)"

Single by 5 Seconds of Summer and Charlie Puth
- Released: 13 August 2019
- Length: 2:37
- Label: Interscope
- Songwriters: Charlie Puth; Louis Bell; Andrew Wotman; Ryan Tedder; Ali Tamposi
- Producers: Puth; Bell; Andrew Watt

Charlie Puth singles chronology
"The Way I Am" (2018)	"Easier (Remix)" (2019)	"I Warned Myself" (2019)

A remix, which features American singer-songwriter Charlie Puth (who also co-wrote and produced the original version), was released on 13 August 2019.

=== Charts ===
Chart (2019)	Peak position
New Zealand Hot Singles (RMNZ)	13

=== Release history ===
Region	Date	Format	Label	Ref.
Various	13 August 2019	Digital download; streaming	Interscope	

== Release history ==
Region	Date	Format	Version	Label	Ref.
Various	23 May 2019	Digital download; streaming	Original	Interscope	
Italy	24 May 2019	Contemporary hit radio	Original	Universal	
United States	28 May 2019	Contemporary hit radio	Original	Interscope	
Various	12 July 2019	Digital download; streaming	SeeB Remix	Interscope	
Various	7 August 2019	Digital download; streaming	Live from The Vault	Interscope	
