= Valentine (5 Seconds of Summer song) =

Single by 5 Seconds of Summer

from the album Youngblood
- Released: 26 August 2018
- Genre: Alternative rock; pop
- Length: 3:16
- Label: Capitol
- Songwriter(s): Luke Hemmings; Calum Hood; Ashton Irwin; Michael Elizondo; Justin Tranter
- Producer(s): Mike Elizondo

5 Seconds of Summer singles chronology
| "Youngblood" (2018) | "Valentine" (2018) | "Killer Queen" (2018) |

Music video
- "Valentine" on YouTube

"Valentine" is a song by Australian pop rock band 5 Seconds of Summer, written by Luke Hemmings, Calum Hood, Ashton Irwin, Michael Elizondo and Justin Tranter. The song was released via Capitol Records on 26 August 2018 as the third single from their third studio album Youngblood.

== Music video ==
A visualizer music video for the song was released on the band's YouTube channel on 26 August 2018. The video shows the band baring their bones as skeletons in a Halloween-esque video.

The song's official music video was released on 14 September 2018. The video shows the band as disembodied heads against a black background, and the camera focuses on their mouths singing the words or their hands playing instruments. The video was co-directed by Andy DeLuca and drummer Ashton Irwin, who said "Collaboration has always been one of the key most important things about 5 Seconds Of Summer since day one and co-directing the video with Andy was an incredible and very fluid experience. There are a few things we wanted to capture; the androgyny and the feminine element of the way Luke performs as well as the dark romance of the song. This video is us taking something into our own hands and attempting to be a part of every single detail of what we create. We hope you enjoy it and I'm looking forward to making many more."

Madeline Roth from MTV believed it "basically looks like the Queen II album cover come to life" and called it a "spooky, groovy vid".

== Reception ==
In an album review, AuspOp called the song a "dead-set ear worm". The Rolling Stone labelled the song as a "standout" with "a bit of goth-y post-punk delivery".

== Charts ==
| Chart (2018–19) | Peak position |
|---|---|
| Australia (ARIA) | 85 |
| Belgium (Ultratip Bubbling Under Flanders) | 19 |
| Belgium (Ultratip Bubbling Under Wallonia) | 41 |
| Czech Republic (Rádio – Top 100) | 6 |
| Israel (Media Forest) | 8 |
| New Zealand Heatseekers (RMNZ) | 4 |

== Certifications ==
| Region | Certification | Certified units/sales |
|---|---|---|
| Australia (ARIA) | Gold | 35,000^{‡} |
| Brazil (Pro-Música Brasil) | Gold | 20,000^{‡} |
| New Zealand (RMNZ) | Gold | 15,000^{‡} |
^{‡} Sales+streaming figures based on certification alone.

== Release history ==
| Region | Date | Format | Label | Ref. |
|---|---|---|---|---|
| Various | 15 June 2018 | Digital download; streaming | Capitol | |
| Australia | 26 August 2018 | Contemporary hit radio | Capitol | |
| United Kingdom | September 28, 2018 | Contemporary hit radio | Capitol | |
