= Ali Tamposi =

American songwriter (born 1989)

- Born: Alexandra Leah Tamposi; November 17, 1989 (age 36)
- Origin: West Palm Beach, Florida U.S.
- Genre: Pop
- Occupation: Singer-songwriter

Alexandra Leah Tamposi (born November 17, 1989) is an American songwriter from West Palm Beach, Florida. She is best known for co-writing Kelly Clarkson's "Stronger (What Doesn't Kill You)," 5 Seconds of Summer's "Youngblood", DJ Snake's "Let Me Love You" (featuring Justin Bieber), Camila Cabello’s "Havana" (featuring Young Thug), and Cabello's "Señorita" with Shawn Mendes.

Tamposi appeared on the final season of The X Factor as vocal coach and mentor to Simon Cowell's team, working alongside groups Restless Road, Sweet Suspense, and winners Alex & Sierra. She worked closely with Alex & Sierra on their debut album, writing four songs with the duo. In 2019, she won BMI Pop Songwriter of The Year.

She was featured on the Cedric Gervais single "Love Again".

She is the granddaughter of real estate developer Samuel A. Tamposi of New Hampshire and Florida. He was one of three sons of Aromanian immigrants from Avdella, Greece.

== Songwriting discography ==
Year	Artist(s)	Song	Album
2008	Beyoncé	"Save the Hero"	I Am... Sasha Fierce
2010	Crystal Bowersox	"Lonely Won't Come Around"	Farmer's Daughter
2011	Kelly Clarkson	"Stronger (What Doesn't Kill You)"	Stronger
2012	Cher Lloyd	"Riot!"	Sticks & Stones (U.S. Edition)
2012	Christina Aguilera	"Around the World"	Lotus
2012	Christina Aguilera	"Empty Words"	Lotus
2013	Demi Lovato	"Never Been Hurt"	Demi
2013	Quadron	"Hey Love"	Avalanche
2013	Ciara	"Overdose"	Ciara
2013	Rozzi Crane	"Crazy Ass Bitch (Remix)" (featuring Kendrick Lamar)	Non-album single
2014	Lea Michele	"On My Way"	Louder
2014	Cedric Gervais	"Love Again" (featuring Ali Tamposi)	Non-album single
2014	One Direction	"Where Do Broken Hearts Go"	Four
2015	Ciara	"One Woman Army"	Jackie
2015	Rozzi Crane	"Crazy Ass Bitch"	Space EP
2015	Wrabel	"I Want You"	Non-album single
2015	Bea Miller	"This Is Not an Apology"	Not an Apology
2015	Max Frost	"Let Me Down Easy"	Intoxication EP
2015	Katharine McPhee	"Stranger Than Fiction"	Hysteria
2015	Nickelback	"She Keeps Me Up"	No Fixed Address
2016	Brooke Candy	"Happy Days"	Non-album single
2016	Against the Current	"In Our Bones"	In Our Bones
2016	Vic Mensa	"16 Shots"	There's Alot Going On
2016	DJ Snake	"Let Me Love You" (featuring Justin Bieber)	Encore
2017	Kygo and Selena Gomez	"It Ain't Me"	Rare
2017	Betty Who	"Wanna Be"	The Valley
2017	Lea Michele	"Run to You"	Places
2017	Lea Michele	"Getaway Car"	Places
2017	Lea Michele	"Hey You"	Places
2017	Nickelback	"After the Rain"	Feed the Machine
2017	Camila Cabello	"Havana" (featuring Young Thug)	Camila
2017	Avicii	"Lonely Together" (featuring Rita Ora)	Avīci (01)
2017	Bebe Rexha	"Comfortable" (featuring Kranium)	All Your Fault: Pt. 2
2017	Hailee Steinfeld and Alesso	"Let Me Go" (featuring Florida Georgia Line and watt)	Non-album single
2017	Rita Ora	"Anywhere"	Phoenix
2017	Selena Gomez and Marshmello	"Wolves"	Rare
2017	Little Mix	"Dear Lover"	Glory Days (Platinum Edition)
2018	Liam Payne and Rita Ora	"For You"	Fifty Shades Freed
2018	Cardi B	"Thru Your Phone"	Invasion of Privacy
2018	5 Seconds of Summer	"Youngblood"	Youngblood
2018	BTS	"Airplane Pt. 2"	Love Yourself: Tear
2018	5 Seconds of Summer	"Lie to Me"	Youngblood
2018	5 Seconds of Summer	"Better Man"	Youngblood
2018	BTS	"Idol"	Love Yourself: Answer
2019	John the Blind	"Hallelujah"	Non-album single
2019	5 Seconds of Summer	"Easier"	Calm
2019	The Chainsmokers & Bebe Rexha	"Call You Mine"	World War Joy
2019	Shawn Mendes and Camila Cabello	"Señorita"	Shawn Mendes and Romance
2019	Charli XCX	"White Mercedes"	Charli
2019	Charlotte Lawrence	"Navy Blue"	Non-album single
2019	Gryffin & Carly Rae Jepsen	"OMG"	Non-album single
2019	Louis the Child	"Too Close" (featuring Wrabel)	Non-album single
2019	5 Seconds of Summer	"Teeth"	13 Reasons Why: Season 3 OST and Calm
2019	Camila Cabello	"Shameless"	Romance
2019	Camila Cabello	"Liar"	Romance
2019	Ozzy Osbourne	"Under the Graveyard"	Ordinary Man
2019	Blink-182	"I Really Wish I Hated You"	Nine
2019	Jake Bugg	"Kiss Like the Sun"	Non-album single
2019	Camila Cabello	"Living Proof"	Romance
2020	Louis Tomlinson	"Always You"	Walls
2020	Ozzy Osbourne	"All My Life"	Ordinary Man
2020	Ozzy Osbourne	"Goodbye"	Ordinary Man
2020	Ozzy Osbourne	"Eat Me"	Ordinary Man
2020	Ozzy Osbourne	"Today Is the End"	Ordinary Man
2020	Ozzy Osbourne	"It's a Raid" (featuring Post Malone)	Ordinary Man
2020	Ozzy Osbourne	"Scary Little Green Men"	Ordinary Man
2020	Ozzy Osbourne	"Holy for Tonight"	Ordinary Man
2020	Dua Lipa	"Break My Heart"	Future Nostalgia
2020	5 Seconds of Summer	"Old Me"	Calm
2020	5 Seconds of Summer	"No Shame"	Calm
2020	5 Seconds of Summer	"Best Years"	Calm
2020	5 Seconds of Summer	"Not in the Same Way"	Calm
2020	5 Seconds of Summer	"Lover of Mine"	Calm
2020	5 Seconds of Summer	"Thin White Lies"	Calm
2020	5 Seconds of Summer	"High"	Calm
2020	Jonas Brothers	"X" (featuring Karol G)	Non-album single
2020	James Blake	"Are You Even Real?"	Non-album single
2020	Kiiara	"I Still Do"	Non-album single
2020	Charlotte Lawrence	"Slow Motion"	Charlotte
2020	Sam Smith	"Just Kids"	Love Goes
2020	Alesso & Charlotte Lawrence	"The End"	Non-album single
2020	John Legend & Faouzia	"Minefields"	Non-album single
2020	Miley Cyrus	"Midnight Sky"	Plastic Hearts
2020	Miley Cyrus	"WTF Do I Know"	Plastic Hearts
2020	Miley Cyrus	"Plastic Hearts"	Plastic Hearts
2020	Miley Cyrus	"Angels like You"	Plastic Hearts
2020	Miley Cyrus	"Prisoner" (featuring Dua Lipa)	Plastic Hearts
2020	Miley Cyrus	"Gimme What I Want"	Plastic Hearts
2020	Miley Cyrus	"Night Crawling" (featuring Billy Idol)	Plastic Hearts
2020	Miley Cyrus	"Hate Me"	Plastic Hearts
2020	Miley Cyrus	"Midnight Sky Remix (Edge of Midnight)" (featuring Stevie Nicks)	Plastic Hearts
2021	Sophia Messa	"Not That Kind of Love"	Non-album single
2021	Liza Owen	"Josie" (featuring Jimmie Allen)	Songs from Monte Nido
2021	Liza Owen	"Starry Eyed"	Songs from Monte Nido
2021	Justin Bieber	"Hold On"	Justice
2021	Justin Bieber	"Deserve You"	Justice
2021	Justin Bieber	"Die for You" (featuring Dominic Fike)	Justice
2021	Justin Bieber	"I Can't Be Myself" (featuring Jaden Smith)	Justice
2021	Justin Bieber	"Hailey"	Justice
2021	Wrabel	"Good"	These Words Are All for You
2021	John Legend	"Crowd Go Crazy"	Space Jam: A New Legacy
2021	Jake Bugg	"About Last Night"	Saturday Night, Sunday Morning
2021	OneRepublic	"Forgot About You"	Human
2021	James Blake	"Foot Forward"	Friends That Break Your Heart
2021	James Blake	"Lost Angel Nights"	Friends That Break Your Heart
2022	Ozzy Osbourne	"Patient Number 9"	Patient Number 9
2022	Ozzy Osbourne	"Immortal"	Patient Number 9
2022	Ozzy Osbourne	"Parasite"	Patient Number 9
2022	Ozzy Osbourne	"No Escape from Now"	Patient Number 9
2022	Ozzy Osbourne	"One of Those Days"	Patient Number 9
2022	Ozzy Osbourne	"A Thousand Shades"	Patient Number 9
2022	Ozzy Osbourne	"Mr. Darkness"	Patient Number 9
2022	Ozzy Osbourne	"Nothing Feels Right"	Patient Number 9
2022	Ozzy Osbourne	"Evil Shuffle"	Patient Number 9
2022	Ozzy Osbourne	"Dead and Gone"	Patient Number 9
2022	Ozzy Osbourne	"God Only Knows"	Patient Number 9
2022	Tate McRae	"You're So Cool"	I Used to Think I Could Fly
2022	Tate McRae	"Uh Oh"	Non-album single
2023	Charlotte Lawrence	"Boys Like You"	Non-album single
2025	Lisa	"Chill"	Alter Ego
2025	Lisa	"Dream"	Alter Ego
2025	Le Sserafim	"Hot"	Hot
2025	Renee Rapp	"Mad"	Bite Me
2025	Renee Rapp	"Why Is She Still Here?	Bite Me
2025	Renee Rapp	"Sometimes"	Bite Me
2025	Renee Rapp	"Kiss It Kiss It"	Bite Me
2025	Renee Rapp	"Good Girl"	Bite Me
2025	Renee Rapp	"I Can't Have You Around Me Anymore"	Bite Me
2025	Renee Rapp	"Shy"	Bite Me
2025	Renee Rapp	"At Least I'm Hot"	Bite Me
2025	Renee Rapp	"I Think I like You Better when You're Gone"	Bite Me
2025	Renee Rapp	"That's So Funny"	Bite Me
2025	Renee Rapp	"You'd Like That Wouldn't You"	Bite Me
2025	Maroon 5	"Priceless" (featuring Lisa)	Love Is Like
2025	Katseye	"Gabriela"	Beautiful Chaos
