= Superbloom (Ashton Irwin album) =

Studio album by Ashton Irwin
- Released: 23 October 2020
- Genre: Alternative rock
- Length: 44:10
- Label: AI Music Group
- Producer: Ashton Irwin; Matthew Pauling

Ashton Irwin chronology
Superbloom (2020)	Blood on the Drums (2024)

Singles from Superbloom
- 1. "Skinny Skinny" Released: 24 September 2020; 2. "Have U Found What Ur Looking For" Released: 2 October 2020; 3. "Scar" Released: 16 October 2020

Superbloom is the debut solo studio album by Australian musician Ashton Irwin, drummer and backing vocalist for Australian pop rock band 5 Seconds of Summer. Musically, the album departs from the band's signature pop rock sound, with Irwin opting for an alternative approach. The album was preceded by three singles, "Skinny Skinny", "Have U Found What Ur Looking For?", and "Scar", and was released on 23 October 2020.

== Background and release ==
On 23 September 2020, Irwin announced the release of his debut solo album, titled Superbloom, which was released on 23 October 2020. It was preceded by the single, "Skinny Skinny", a track about issues concerning body image, something Irwin says he has "never confronted in a creative form". Irwin stated that "Superbloom explores my inner philosophies and feelings about the walk of life I have found myself on". He reiterated: "It brings me the greatest joy of all that I am in a band that allows me to create freely inside and outside of it".

== Promotion ==
Irwin performed the album for Superbloom: A Live Concert Film, which was performed on 30 October 2020, to celebrate the release of his first album. He performed all songs on the album as well as his cover of “Heart-Shaped Box” by Nirvana. A live album of the concert film, Superbloom: A Live Experience, was released on 20 November.

== Track listing ==
All tracks are written and produced by Ashton Irwin and Matthew Pauling.

Superbloom
No.	Title	Length
1.	"Scar"	4:24
2.	"Have U Found What Ur Looking For?"	3:59
3.	"Skinny Skinny"	4:30
4.	"Greyhound"	6:20
5.	"Matter of Time" (interlude)	2:25
6.	"Sunshine"	3:50
7.	"The Sweetness"	5:29
8.	"I'm to Blame"	3:50
9.	"Drive"	5:15
10.	"Perfect Lie"	4:15
Total length:		44:10

== Charts ==
Chart performance for Superbloom
Chart (2020)	Peak position
Australian Albums (ARIA)	37
UK Album Downloads (OCC)	36
US Top Current Album Sales (Billboard)	77

== Release history ==
Release history and formats for Superbloom
Region	Date	Format(s)	Label	Ref.
Various	23 October 2020	CD; digital download; streaming	AI Music Group	
