= Blood on the Drums =

Studio album by Ashton Irwin
- Released: 17 July 2024
- Genre: Alternative pop-rock
- Length: 48:54
- Label: Al Music Group
- Producer: Ashton Irwin; John Feldmann; Matthew Pauling

Ashton Irwin chronology
| Superbloom (2020) | Blood on the Drums (2024) |

Singles from Blood on the Drums
- 1. "Straight To Your Heart" Released: 4 June 2024; 2. "Breakup" Released: 12 June 2024; 3. "Blood On The Drums" Released: 26 June 2024; 4. "The Canyon" Released: 16 July 2024

Blood on the Drums (stylised in all caps) is the second solo studio album by Australian musician Ashton Irwin, drummer and backing vocalist for Australian pop rock band 5 Seconds of Summer. It was released on 17 July 2024 through Al Music Group and follows his debut album, Superbloom (2020). The album was released in two parts: The Thorns, released 12 June, and The Roses, released 17 July. It was preceded by the lead single "Straight to Your Heart", released on 4 June, and the second single, "The Canyon" released on 17 July.

== Background and composition ==
The album was produced by Irwin with John Feldmann and Matthew Pauling. "Straight To Your Heart" was the first song written for the record and defined the sound of the rest of it, also influenced by classic rock tracks like "Lips Like Sugar", "Bigmouth Strikes Again", and "(Don't Fear) The Reaper". The title is “a metaphor for how much I’ve given to my music.” Lyrically, the album looks outward reflecting on Irwin's personal life and universal themes. He further described it in an interview with Rock Sound:

I was thinking about the people I left behind, the people I miss, the family that I had to leave when I was young. Thinking about the addictions I’ve been through. The way I evolved as a young man who never had a father. Thinking about my personal strength and knowing that generally speaking no one else has my back but me and becoming someone that I have to be for the rest of my life.

— Ashton Irwin

== Track listing ==
All tracks are written and produced by Ashton Irwin. Additional writers and producers are included below.

Blood on the Drums (The Thorns) track listing
| No. | Title | Writer(s) | Producer(s) | Length |
|---|---|---|---|---|
| 1. | "Straight to Your Heart" | John Feldmann | Feldmann | 3:12 |
| 2. | "Breakup" | Matthew Pauling | Pauling | 3:09 |
| 3. | "Blood on the Drums" | Feldmann | Feldmann | 2:40 |
| 4. | "I See the Angels" | Feldmann; Rachel West | Feldmann | 2:46 |
| 5. | "Lose You" | Feldmann; West | Feldmann | 2:43 |
| 6. | "Rebel at Heart" | Pauling | Pauling | 3:21 |
| 7. | "Last Night of My Life" | Feldmann; Simon Wilcox | Feldmann | 2:48 |
| 8. | "Indestructible" | Feldmann; Laura Pergolizzi | Feldmann | 2:42 |

Blood on the Drums (The Roses) track listing
| No. | Title | Writer(s) | Producer(s) | Length |
|---|---|---|---|---|
| 9. | "The Canyon" | Pauling | Pauling | 4:36 |
| 10. | "California Holds Her Breath" | Feldmann; Emma Rosen | Feldmann | 3:06 |
| 11. | "Little Spark" | Feldmann; Wilcox | Feldmann | 2:28 |
| 12. | "Wicked Habit" | Feldmann; Eva Busacker Arnby | Feldmann | 2:37 |
| 13. | "Marry You" | Feldmann; Rosen | Feldmann | 2:37 |
| 14. | "Glory Days" | Feldmann; West | Feldmann | 2:29 |
| 15. | "Wild Things" | Feldmann; Emma Rosen | Feldmann | 2:37 |
| 16. | "Endless Wave" | Pauling | Pauling | 5:03 |
| Total length: | | | | 48:54 |
