= Youngblood (5 Seconds of Summer album) =

- Standard, CD and digital cover

Studio album by 5 Seconds of Summer
- Released: 15 June 2018
- Studio: Conway (Los Angeles)
- Genre: Pop
- Length: 40:12
- Labels: Capitol; Hi or Hey
- Producers: Louis Bell; Mike Elizondo; Carl Falk; Andrew Goldstein; The Monsters & Strangerz; Jake Sinclair; Sir Nolan; Andrew Watt; Andrew Wells; Rami Yacoub

5 Seconds of Summer chronology
Sounds Good Feels Good (2015)	Youngblood (2018)	Meet You There Tour Live (2018)

Singles from Youngblood
- 1. "Want You Back" Released: 22 February 2018; 2. "Youngblood" Released: 12 April 2018; 3. "Valentine" Released: 26 August 2018; 4. "Lie to Me" Released: 21 December 2018

Youngblood is the third studio album by Australian pop rock band 5 Seconds of Summer. The album was initially set to be released on 22 June 2018, but was later brought forward to 15 June. Four singles were released in support of the album: "Want You Back", "Youngblood", "Valentine" and "Lie to Me". The album was released to positive reviews, with critics praising the lyrical maturity and the sound change from their previous work. In support of the album, the band embarked on the Meet You There Tour.

As well as appearing on a multitude of weekly and 2018 and 2019 year-end charts over several countries and receiving multiple certifications, the album's title track, "Youngblood", impacted the ARIA decade-end chart (2010–2019), which ranks the most popular songs of the decade, at number thirty-seven. In the ARIA Australian decade-end chart (2010–2019), ranking the most popular songs of the decade by Australian artists, "Youngblood" ranked at number four. "Youngblood" sold over five million adjusted copies and is the most streamed Australian song of all time on Apple Music. According to ARIA certifications,"Youngblood" is the eleventh best-selling single in Australian history. Youngblood was the most-streamed Australian album of 2018. In February 2020, the band were honored in the APRA AMCOS' The 1,000,000,000 List, for "Youngblood" having been streamed over 1 billion times.

== Background and recording ==
Following the conclusion of the Sounds Live Feels Live World Tour on 5 October 2016, the band took off the remainder of the year as a break, before starting the writing process for their new album in the beginning of 2017. Throughout 2016, the band had been teasing new material from the album. On 1 February, drummer Ashton Irwin posted on Snapchat that he was writing a new song, which was followed by a clip posted by bassist Calum Hood and guitarist Michael Clifford, where a brief snippet of a drum beat can be heard. A month later, new songs were registered on different publishing sites, crediting the band members, along with collaborators Bonnie McKee and John Feldmann. The song "Meet You There", which was released as a bonus track on the deluxe edition, was however written in late 2016. The last song written for the album was "Want You Back" in late 2017.

Guitarist Michael Clifford said of the process, "It's taking a really long time to perfect the new sound and direction we're taking. I think the reason it's taken so long is because we haven't just wanted to get it to a place where we're happy […] We want it to be perfect."

The album was almost exclusively recorded in Los Angeles, CA, primarily at Conway Recording Studios.

== Promotion ==
=== 5SOS III Promotional Tour ===
Prior to the album's release, the band embarked on the worldwide promotional 5SOS III Tour, a four-leg tour which took place at 26 intimate venues. The tour sold out within approximately 3 minutes, with the critics praising it as "a nice teaser for what promises to be a much larger-scale fall tour." The tour began on 20 March 2018 and ended on 6 June.

List of 2018 concerts
Date	City	Country	Venue
20 March 2018	Stockholm	Sweden	Debaser Strand
23 March 2018	Antwerp	Belgium	Trix
24 March 2018	Cologne	Germany	Gloria
26 March 2018	Amsterdam	Netherlands	Melkweg
29 March 2018	Milan	Italy	Fabrique
4 April 2018	Paris	France	Yoyo
5 April 2018	London	England	Heaven
8 April 2018	Boston	United States	Paradise Rock Club
9 April 2018	Philadelphia	United States	Theatre of Living Arts
10 April 2018	Silver Spring	United States	The Fillmore
12 April 2018	New York	United States	Irving Plaza
13 April 2018	Toronto	Canada	Danforth Music Hall
15 April 2018	Minneapolis	United States	Varsity Theater
16 April 2018	Chicago	United States	House of Blues Chicago
18 April 2018	Nashville	United States	Cannery Ballroom
19 April 2018	Dallas	United States	House of Blues Dallas
21 April 2018	Houston	United States	House of Blues Houston
23 April 2018	Phoenix	United States	The Van Buren
25 April 2018	Los Angeles	United States	The Belasco Theater
26 April 2018	San Diego	United States	House of Blues San Diego
27 April 2018	San Francisco	United States	The Fillmore
2 May 2018	Singapore	Singapore	Capitol Theatre
24 May 2018	Sydney	Australia	Metro
29 May 2018	Melbourne	Australia	170 Russell
4 June 2018	Mexico City	Mexico	Lunario Del Auditorio Nacional
6 June 2018	São Paulo	Brazil	Cine Joia

=== Live performances and TV appearances ===
The band performed their lead single "Want You Back" on The Tonight Show Starring Jimmy Fallon on 11 April. They performed the single again on The Voice (U.S. season 14) on 8 May. On 25 May, the group performed for selected fans for a Spotify Fans First Event at Sydney, Australia. Spotify invited the band's top-streaming fans to watch the acoustic session. The band performed their second single "Youngblood" on The Voice Australia. They also performed it on BBC Radio 1's Live Lounge on 12 June, along with a cover of Alice Merton's "No Roots". On 22 June, the band performed on The Today Show's Summer Concert Series. They then collaborated with Tumblr and organized an intimate Tumblr IRL event for their fans on 25 June at Brooklyn, New York. On 1 August, the band released the Spotify-exclusive recording of their "Lie to Me" track, a stripped back version which was made available for streaming, along with a cover of Post Malone's "Stay".

=== Documentary and video series ===
Apple Music released the "On the Record: 5 Seconds of Summer – Youngblood" documentary, featuring interviews about the making of the album. Apple Music also organised a one-night show in New York on the release date of the album to showcase the short film. The band also performed for their fans. A recording of the full performance was released on Apple Music.

The band also released a series of short videos on YouTube, titled "5SOS Cocktail Chats", where they discussed the details of writing each track while drinking cocktails. There were seven episodes which were released on a weekly basis, usually every Monday of the week.

- Episode 1 – "Youngblood" and "Want You Back"
- Episode 2 – "Lie to Me" and "Valentine"
- Episode 3 – "Moving Along" and "Talk Fast"
- Episode 4 – "If Walls Could Talk" and "Better Man"
- Episode 5 – "More" and "Why Won't You Love Me"
- Episode 6 – "Empty Wallets"
- Episode 7 – "Woke Up in Japan" and "Ghost of You"

== Tour ==
Prior to the album's release, the band embarked on the promotional 5SOS III Tour, which took place at 26 intimate concert venues worldwide. Along with gaining positive critic reviews, tickets for the tour sold out entirely within three minutes.

The Meet You There Tour was scheduled to visit Japan, New Zealand, Australia, Canada, US, and Europe. The tour began on 2 August 2018 and concluded on 19 November 2018. The tour was met with positive reviews, with Billboard praising the show for its "impressive" and "electric energy"

== Singles ==
The album's lead single, "Want You Back", was released via Capitol Records on 22 February 2018. The album's title track, "Youngblood", was initially released as a promotional single on 13 April. It was later sent to American contemporary hit radio on 22 May as the album's second single. It has been since been certified as nine times platinum by Australian Recording Industry Association, platinum by Recorded Music New Zealand, platinum by British Phonographic Industry, and platinum by Recording Industry Association of America. "Valentine" was released on 26 August 2018 as the third single from the album. On 21 December 2018, a re-recorded version of "Lie to Me" featuring Julia Michaels was released as the album's fourth single.

== Critical reception ==
Professional ratings
Review scores
Source	Rating
AllMusic	3.5/5 stars
idobi Radio	Positive
The Independent	3/5 stars
The Irish News	8/10
The Music	4.5/5 stars
Rolling Stone	3/5 stars
Ultimate Guitar	5/10

Matt Collar of AllMusic wrote that the group embraced a "slick dance-pop sound" on their album and that "the transition to a streamlined, post-EDM-flavored sound isn't really a shock, even if it's a notable shift" while concluding that it is "a useful sound for 5SOS to embrace, and helps position them nicely as a lighter version of The 1975 or Imagine Dragons.

Brittany Spanos of Rolling Stone also commented on the transition and wrote that, "pop-punk is not a genre that's meant to carry a band through a full career. So it's not surprising that on their third album, [the group] have already aged out of the sound that built their success. Instead, Youngblood goes full pop, leaning into some Eighties inflection and foregoing the bratty, DGAF ethos of their earlier work." However, she also felt that, "[a] downside of the new sound is that the boys lose a little bit of the spunk that made them big in the first place. The snottiness of pop-punk highlighted their natural humor, and while they've certainly grown as musicians, singers and writers, a bit of that goofy charm is missing". Nick Hasted and Ilana Kaplan of The Independent opined that "the grit the band had on their first two records is definitely missed" but that "fans will probably still enjoy the sounds of 5SOS". Atlas Artist Group praised the album, referring to it as a "surprising and welcome departure from the sound that made them famous" and that the record "boasts solid tracks and hardly any filler." The article went on to say that it was "clear that [5 Seconds of Summer] spent their time honing a craft that's been overlooked by stereotyping naysayers." and claimed that the record made them "a band that simply can't be ignored." Ryan Ward of The Irish News named the record an "unmistakably pop album [that] is suitably edgy and reflective in parts" while writing that they "strengthen[ed] their position as the definitive pop-rock band of recent years" with Youngblood.

Travis Lausch of Ultimate Guitar gave a mixed review, writing, "this is still a massive, jarring shift away from loud guitars and Green Day influence into a more urban-friendly style. The Imagine Dragons comparisons will be all too easy to make on the opening title track, with its guitars-pushed-in-the-background stomp-clap-and-fingersnaps electronic drum style. The following fifteen tracks do little to really remind the listener of past 5SOS works, and instead, these are very generic pop/rock tracks." Another mixed review was written by Haydon Benfield of Renowned for Sound, who said, "The eponymous Youngblood opens the record with its R&B inspired verses and pre-chorus, though the song only truly comes together on the chorus, but not enough to distract from the excessive repetition present in the track. Lead single, 'Want You Back', features a piano-driven intro but settles into the more familiar guitar and drums sound for most of the song. It is an incredibly polished song, with hints of Maroon 5 in its guitar and beat, but the sense that something is missing holds the song back [...] A good beat underlies 'Empty Wallets', and the bass on the track's second chorus is surprising in its adroitness, but the song is easily too long by a third, which is a fault shared by many of Youngblood's thirteen songs. Youngblood demonstrates plenty of promise at times but ultimately ends up bogged down in the usual tropes of contemporary pop music.

Chris DeVille of Stereogum wrote a less positive review, saying that the album "slips all the way into that lukewarm soup" and that "the longer Youngblood goes on, the less it holds together" while feeling that "5SOS really didn't need to go this route" although he did compliment "Moving Along" and "Monster Among Men" as the album's highlights.

=== Accolades ===
Alternative Press named the album in its Best Albums of 2018 list. At the 2018 ARIA Music Awards, the album won the annual ARIA Award for Best Group.

== Commercial performance ==
Youngblood was a commercial success and debuted at number one in Australia, becoming 5 Seconds of Summer's third number-one album in their home country. It debuted atop the albums chart at the same week that the title track was number one for a fifth week on the singles chart. Youngblood was the most-streamed Australian album of 2018.

In the United States, it became their third number-one album on the Billboard 200 chart, debuting with 142,000 album-equivalent units, including 117,000 in pure album sales. The album debuted ahead of the Carters' (Beyoncé and Jay-Z) Everything Is Love, with industry forecasters initially unsure of which album would take the top spot. This made them the first Australian act with three number-one albums in the US. It also led to 5 Seconds of Summer being the first band (not vocal group) to have their first three full-length studio albums debut atop the Billboard 200. The album consecutively remained on the Billboard 200 chart for a total of 63 weeks (approximately one year and four months).

The album's title track single, "Youngblood" achieved worldwide success and with a third consecutive number one album in the US, 5 Seconds of Summer became the only band (not vocal group) in chart history to see its first three full-length studio albums enter the chart at No.1 on the Billboard 200. 5 Seconds of Summer also became the first and only Australian act in history to earn three number one albums on the Billboard charts. With a third No.1 in their home country, 5 Seconds of Summer became the second Australian band in history to have their first four full-length studio albums debut at number one on the ARIA albums chart.

"Youngblood" peaked in more than 15-year-end charts in 2018, was officially certified Australia's 2018 song of the year and won the ARIA Award for Song of the Year. The song was ranked at number seven in The UK's Official Top 40 Biggest Song of the Summer 2018. In 2019, "Youngblood" peaked in more than 10-year-end charts and has since received official platinum and gold notable achievement certifications in over 15 countries.

As well as appearing on a multitude of weekly and year-end charts over several countries and receiving multiple certifications, "Youngblood" impacted the ARIA decade-end chart (2010–2019), which ranks the most popular songs of the decade, at number thirty-seven. In the ARIA Australian decade-end chart (2010–2019), ranking the most popular songs of the decade by Australian artists, "Youngblood" ranked at number four. "Youngblood" sold over five million adjusted copies in the first six months of its release and is the most streamed Australian song of all time on Apple Music. In February 2020, 5 Seconds of Summer were honored in the APRA AMCOS' The 1,000,000,000 List, for "Youngblood" having been streamed over 1 billion times. In June 2020, "Youngblood" was awarded an ASCAP Pop Music Award.

As of June 2020, "Youngblood" has spent over 110 consecutive weeks (over 2 years) in the Top 20 on the ARIA Australian Singles chart.

== Track listing ==
Youngblood – Standard edition
No.	Title	Writer(s)	Producer(s)	Length
1.	"Youngblood"	Calum Hood; Luke Hemmings; Ashton Irwin; Louis Bell; Andrew Wotman; Alexandra Tamposi	Watt; Bell	3:23
2.	"Want You Back"	Hood; Hemmings; Irwin; Jacob Kasher Hindlin; Andrew Goldstein; Asia Whiteacre; Steve Mac	Andrew Wells; Goldstein	2:53
3.	"Lie to Me"	Hood; Hemmings; Irwin; Wotman; Tamposi	Watt^{[p]}; Nick Taylor^{[s]}; Tommy D^{[s]}	2:30
4.	"Valentine"	Hood; Hemmings; Irwin; Mike Elizondo; Justin Tranter	Elizondo	3:16
5.	"Talk Fast"	Hood; Hemmings; Irwin; Michael Clifford; Rami Yacoub; Carl Falk; Tranter	Falk; Yacoub	3:07
6.	"Moving Along"	Hood; Hemmings; Clifford; Yacoub; Falk; Tranter	Falk; Yacoub; Noah Passovoy^{[b]}	3:17
7.	"If Walls Could Talk"	Hood; Irwin; Julia Michaels; Nolan Lambroza; Tranter	Sir Nolan	3:02
8.	"Better Man"	Hemmings; Clifford; Wotman; Stefan Johnson; Jordan K. Johnson; Marcus Lomax; Tamposi	Watt; The Monsters & Strangerz	3:09
9.	"More"	Hemmings; Irwin; Yacoub; Falk; Wayne Hector; Kristoffer Fogelmark; Albin Nedler	Falk; Yacoub; Fogelmark^{[c]}; Nedler^{[c]}; Passovoy^{[b]}	3:14
10.	"Why Won't You Love Me"	Hemmings; Irwin; Jake Sinclair; Rivers Cuomo	Sinclair	3:20
11.	"Woke Up in Japan"	Hemmings; Irwin; Sinclair; Nick Ruth; Kevin Fisher; Teddy Geiger; Janelle Dolrayne	Sinclair	2:37
12.	"Empty Wallets"	Hood; Hemmings; Irwin; Clifford; Yacoub; Falk; Tranter	Falk; Yacoub; Passovoy^{[b]}	3:07
13.	"Ghost of You"	Hemmings; Irwin; Goldstein; Dan Book; Mitchell Collins	Goldstein; Book^{[a]}	3:17
Total length:				40:12

Youngblood – Deluxe edition bonus tracks
No.	Title	Writer(s)	Producer(s)	Length
14.	"Monster Among Men"	Hood; Hemmings; Irwin; Clifford; Yacoub; Falk; Tranter	Falk; Yacoub; Passovoy^{[b]}	3:12
15.	"Meet You There"	Hemmings; Irwin; Yacoub; Falk; Hactor; Tranter	Falk; Yacoub; Passovoy^{[b]}	3:10
16.	"Babylon"	Hood; Clifford; Book; Goldstein; Matthew Koma	Goldstein; Book^{[a]}	3:33
Total length:				50:07

Youngblood – Target exclusive bonus tracks
No.	Title	Writer(s)	Lead vocals	Length
17.	"When You Walk Away"	Hood; Hemmings; Irwin; Clifford; Yacoub; Falk; Hector; Tranter	Hemmings, Hood & Clifford	3:05
18.	"Best Friend"	Irwin; Hood; Elizondo; Tranter	Irwin	3:03
Total length:				56:15

Youngblood – Japanese bonus tracks
No.	Title	Writer(s)	Lead vocals	Length
19.	"Midnight"	Hood; Hemmings; Irwin; Clifford; Elizondo; Tranter	Hemmings with Irwin & Hood	3:08
Total length:				59:23

Notes

- ^{^[p]} signifies a primary and strings producer.
- ^{^[c]} signifies a co-producer
- ^{^[a]} signifies an additional producer
- ^{^[s]} signifies a strings producer.
- ^{^[b]} signifies a bass producer.

== Personnel ==
5 Seconds of Summer

- Michael Clifford – guitar, vocals (all tracks); backing vocals (tracks 1, 3, 8)
- Luke Hemmings – guitar, vocals (all tracks); backing vocals (tracks 1, 3, 8)
- Calum Hood – bass guitar, vocals (all tracks); backing vocals (tracks 1, 3, 8)
- Ashton Irwin – drums, vocals (all tracks); backing vocals (tracks 1, 3, 8), percussion (4)

Additional musicians

- Andrew Goldstein – keyboards, programming (tracks 1, 2, 13, 16); guitar (1, 2), backing vocals (1), additional vocals (2), additional guitar (13, 16)
- Ali Tamposi – backing vocals (tracks 1, 3, 8)
- Andrew Wells – guitar, keyboards, programming (track 2)
- Andrew Watt – background vocals, guitar, keyboards, programming (tracks 3, 8); string arrangement (3)
- Rosie Danvers – cello, string arrangement (track 3)
- Jane Oliver – cello (track 3)
- Richard Pryce – double bass (track 3)
- Debbie Widdup – violin (track 3)
- Eleanor Mathieson – violin (track 3)
- Emma Owens – violin (track 3)
- Hayley Pomfrett – violin (track 3)
- Jenny Sacha – violin (track 3)
- Meghan Cassidy – violin (track 3)
- Natalia Bonner – violin (track 3)
- Patrick Kiernan – violin (track 3)
- Sally Jackson – violin (track 3)
- Sarah Sexton – violin (track 3)
- Mike Elizondo – drum programming, keyboards (track 4)
- Henry Lunetta – guitar, keyboards (track 4)
- Justin Tranter – additional vocals (tracks 5, 12)
- Carl Falk – additional vocals (tracks 5, 14, 15); additional instrumentation, programming (5)
- Rami Yacoub – additional instrumentation, additional vocals (5), programming (track 5)
- Noah Passovoy – live drums, electric guitar, grand piano (tracks 6, 9, 12, 14, 15)
- Sir Nolan – programming (track 7)
- The Monsters & Strangerz – programming (track 8)
- Albin Nedler – additional instrumentation, additional vocals, programming (track 9)
- Kristoffer Fogelmark – additional instrumentation, additional vocals, programming (track 9)
- Jake Sinclair – backing vocals (track 10), additional vocals (12)

Technical

- Chris Gehringer – mastering
- Serban Ghenea – mixing (tracks 1, 3)
- Mark "Spike" Stent – mixing (tracks 2, 4–16)
- David Rodriguez – engineering (tracks 1, 3, 8)
- Andrew Goldstein – engineering, editing (tracks 2, 16)
- Andrew Wells – engineering, editing (track 2)
- Adam Hawkins – engineering (track 4)
- Brent Arrowood – engineering (track 4)
- Simon Sigfridsson – engineering (tracks 5, 9, 12, 14, 15)
- Ben Sedano – engineering (tracks 6, 9, 12, 14, 15)
- Thomas Cullison – engineering (tracks 6, 9, 12, 14, 15)
- Suzy Shinn – engineering (tracks 10, 11)
- Chris Kahn – engineering (track 13), drum engineering (16)
- Dan Book – engineering, editing (track 16)
- John Hanes – mix engineering (tracks 1, 3)
- Andrew Watt – string engineering (track 3)
- Nick Taylor – string engineering (track 3)
- Tommy D – string engineering (track 3)
- Noah Passovoy – additional engineering, live instrument engineering (track 5); bass engineering, bass recording (6, 9, 12, 14, 15)
- Michael Freeman – mixing assistance (tracks 2, 4–16)
- Alonzo Lazaro – engineering assistance (track 4)
- Amber Jones – engineering assistance (tracks 10, 11)
- Jason Moser – engineering assistance (tracks 10, 11)
- Rachel White – engineering assistance (tracks 10, 1)
- Sacha Bambadji – engineering assistance (tracks 10, 11)

Visuals

- Vladimir Sepetov – creative direction, packaging
- Andy Deluca – album artwork, photography
- Sarah Eiseman – photography
- Alexandra Gavillet – photography

== Charts ==
=== Weekly charts ===
Chart (2018)	Peak position
Australian Albums (ARIA)	1
Austrian Albums (Ö3 Austria)	5
Belgian Albums (Ultratop Flanders)	3
Belgian Albums (Ultratop Wallonia)	14
Canadian Albums (Billboard)	3
Czech Albums (ČNS IFPI)	18
Danish Albums (Hitlisten)	7
Dutch Albums (Album Top 100)	2
Finnish Albums (Suomen virallinen lista)	8
French Albums (SNEP)	46
German Albums (Offizielle Top 100)	6
Hungarian Albums (MAHASZ)	32
Irish Albums (IRMA)	3
Italian Albums (FIMI)	5
Japan Hot Albums (Billboard Japan)	58
Japanese Albums (Oricon)	37
Mexican Albums (AMPROFON)	3
New Zealand Albums (RMNZ)	2
Norwegian Albums (VG-lista)	6
Polish Albums (ZPAV)	9
Portuguese Albums (AFP)	6
Scottish Albums (Official Charts)	4
Slovak Albums (ČNS IFPI)	25
South Korean International Albums (Circle)	4
Spanish Albums (Promusicae)	2
Swedish Albums (Sverigetopplistan)	15
Swiss Albums (Schweizer Hitparade)	8
Taiwanese Albums (Five Music)	5
UK Albums (Official Charts)	3
US Billboard 200	1

=== Year-end charts ===
Chart (2018)	Position
Australian Albums (ARIA)	45
Australian Artist Albums (ARIA)	7
Belgian Albums (Ultratop Flanders)	125
Canadian Albums (Billboard)	48
Danish Albums (Hitlisten)	70
Mexican Albums (AMPROFON)	51
US Billboard 200	72

Chart (2019)	Position
Australian Artist Albums (ARIA)	32
US Billboard 200	138

== Certifications ==
Region	Certification	Certified units/sales
Australia (ARIA)	Gold	35,000^{‡}
Canada (Music Canada)	Platinum	80,000^{‡}
Denmark (IFPI Danmark)	Platinum	20,000^{‡}
Italy (FIMI)	Gold	25,000^{‡}
Mexico (AMPROFON)	Gold	30,000^{‡}
New Zealand (RMNZ)	2× Platinum	30,000^{‡}
Poland (ZPAV)	Platinum	20,000^{‡}
Singapore (RIAS)	Platinum	10,000^{*}
Sweden (GLF)	Gold	15,000^{‡}
United Kingdom (BPI)	Gold	100,000^{‡}
United States (RIAA)	Platinum	1,000,000^{‡}
^{*} Sales figures based on certification alone.^{‡} Sales+streaming figures based on certification alone.
