= Meet You There Tour =

2018 concert tour by 5 Seconds of Summer

- Tour by 5 Seconds of Summer
- Promotional poster for the tour
- Location: Europe; Japan; North America; Oceania
- Associated album: Youngblood
- Start date: 2 August 2018
- End date: 19 November 2018
- Legs: 4
- No. of shows: 53

5 Seconds of Summer concert chronology
- 5SOS III Tour (2018); Meet You There Tour (2018); Take My Hand World Tour (2022)

The Meet You There Tour was the third headlining concert tour by the Australian pop rock band 5 Seconds of Summer in support of their third studio album Youngblood. The tour began in Osaka, Japan on 2 August 2018, and concluded in Madrid, Spain on 19 November 2018.

A live recording was released on 21 December 2018 under the title Meet You There Tour Live.

== Background ==
Following their March 2018 to June 2018 5SOS III promotional world tour which sold out within three minutes and was praised by critics, the band announced that they would be embarking on another world tour in support of their third studio album, Youngblood.

The band announced the North America dates on 13 April 2018. They announced the Australian dates on 21 May 2018. The European dates were added on 8 June 2018. Additional UK dates were added for Glasgow, Manchester and London on 14 June 2018.

== Live album ==
Meet You There Tour Live

Live album by 5 Seconds of Summer
- Released: 21 December 2018
- Length: 82:16
- Label: Capitol

5 Seconds of Summer chronology
Youngblood (2018)	Meet You There Tour Live (2018)	Calm (2020)

Meet You There Tour Live is the second live album by the Australian pop rock band 5 Seconds of Summer. Announced via Twitter, the album was digitally released on 21 December 2018 without any prior notice. Additionally, they released a vinyl version. It features all the songs performed live during the band's third tour except for "Girls Talk Boys".

=== Charts ===
Chart performance for Meet You There Tour Live
Chart (2018)	Peak position
Australian Digital Albums (ARIA)	41
UK Album Downloads (Official Charts)	88

== Tour dates ==
List of 2018 concerts
Date	City	Country	Venue	Opening Act(s)
2 August 2018	Osaka	Japan	Zepp Osaka Bayside	—N/a
3 August 2018	Tokyo	Japan	Zepp Tokyo	—N/a
7 August 2018	Auckland	New Zealand	Logan Campbell Center	Nakita
9 August 2018	Sydney	Australia	Hordern Pavilion	Muki
11 August 2018	Brisbane	Australia	Convention & Exhibition Centre	Muki
13 August 2018	Melbourne	Australia	Festival Hall	Muki
16 August 2018	Adelaide	Australia	Thebarton Theatre	Muki
18 August 2018	Perth	Australia	HBF Stadium	Muki
27 August 2018	Toronto	Canada	RBC Echo Beach	The Aces
29 August 2018	Uncasville	United States	Mohegan Sun Arena	The Aces
30 August 2018	Boston	United States	Leader Bank Pavilion	The Aces
1 September 2018	Allentown	United States	The Great Allentown Fair	The Aces
2 September 2018	Virginia Beach	United States	Veterans United Home Loans Amphitheatre	The Aces
5 September 2018	Vienna	United States	Wolf Trap	The Aces
7 September 2018	Allegan	United States	Allegan Country Fair	The Aces
8 September 2018	Chicago	United States	Aragon Ballroom	The Aces
9 September 2018	Minneapolis	United States	The Armory	The Aces
11 September 2018	Rochester Hills	United States	Meadow Brook Amphitheatre	The Aces
13 September 2018	York	United States	York Fair	The Aces
14 September 2018	Holmdel	United States	PNC Bank Arts Center	The Aces
18 September 2018	Lake Buena Vista	United States	House of Blues	The Aces
19 September 2018	Atlanta	United States	Coca-Cola Roxy	The Aces
20 September 2018	Charlotte	United States	PNC Music Pavilion	The Aces
24 September 2018	Nashville	United States	Nashville Municipal Auditorium	The Aces
26 September 2018	Rogers	United States	Walmart AMP	The Aces
27 September 2018	Irving	United States	The Pavilion at Toyota Music Factory	The Aces
28 September 2018	Sugar Land	United States	Smart Financial Centre	The Aces
30 September 2018	Denver	United States	Fillmore Auditorium	The Aces
2 October 2018	San Diego	United States	Cal Coast Credit Union Open Air Theatre	The Aces
3 October 2018	San Jose	United States	Event Centre	The Aces
5 October 2018	Seattle	United States	The Paramount	The Aces
11 October 2018	Phoenix	United States	Comerica Theatre	The Aces
12 October 2018	Los Angeles	United States	The Greek Theatre	The Aces
23 October 2018	Glasgow	Scotland	O2 Academy	lovelytheband
24 October 2018	Glasgow	Scotland	O2 Academy	lovelytheband
26 October 2018	Manchester	England	O2 Apollo	lovelytheband
27 October 2018	Manchester	England	O2 Apollo	lovelytheband
29 October 2018	London	England	O2 Academy Brixton	lovelytheband
30 October 2018	London	England	Eventim Apollo	lovelytheband
1 November 2018	Birmingham	England	O2 Academy	lovelytheband
2 November 2018	Sheffield	England	O2 Academy	lovelytheband
4 November 2018	Brussels	Belgium	Forest National	lovelytheband
5 November 2018	Amsterdam	Netherlands	AFAS Live	lovelytheband
6 November 2018	Hamburg	Germany	Mehr! Theatre	lovelytheband
8 November 2018	Copenhagen	Denmark	Forum Black Box	lovelytheband
9 November 2018	Oslo	Norway	Sentrum Scene	lovelytheband
10 November 2018	Stockholm	Sweden	Fryshuset	lovelytheband
12 November 2018	Cologne	Germany	Palladium	lovelytheband
13 November 2018	Paris	France	Zenith	lovelytheband
15 November 2018	Munich	Germany	Tonhalle	lovelytheband
16 November 2018	Zurich	Switzerland	Halle 622	lovelytheband
17 November 2018	Milan	Italy	Forum	lovelytheband
19 November 2018	Madrid	Spain	Wizink Center	lovelytheband

== Personnel ==
- Luke Hemmings – lead vocals, rhythm guitar, piano
- Calum Hood – bass guitar, keyboard, vocals
- Michael Clifford – lead guitar, vocals, piano
- Ashton Irwin – drums, percussion, vocals
