= The Faim =

Australian rock band

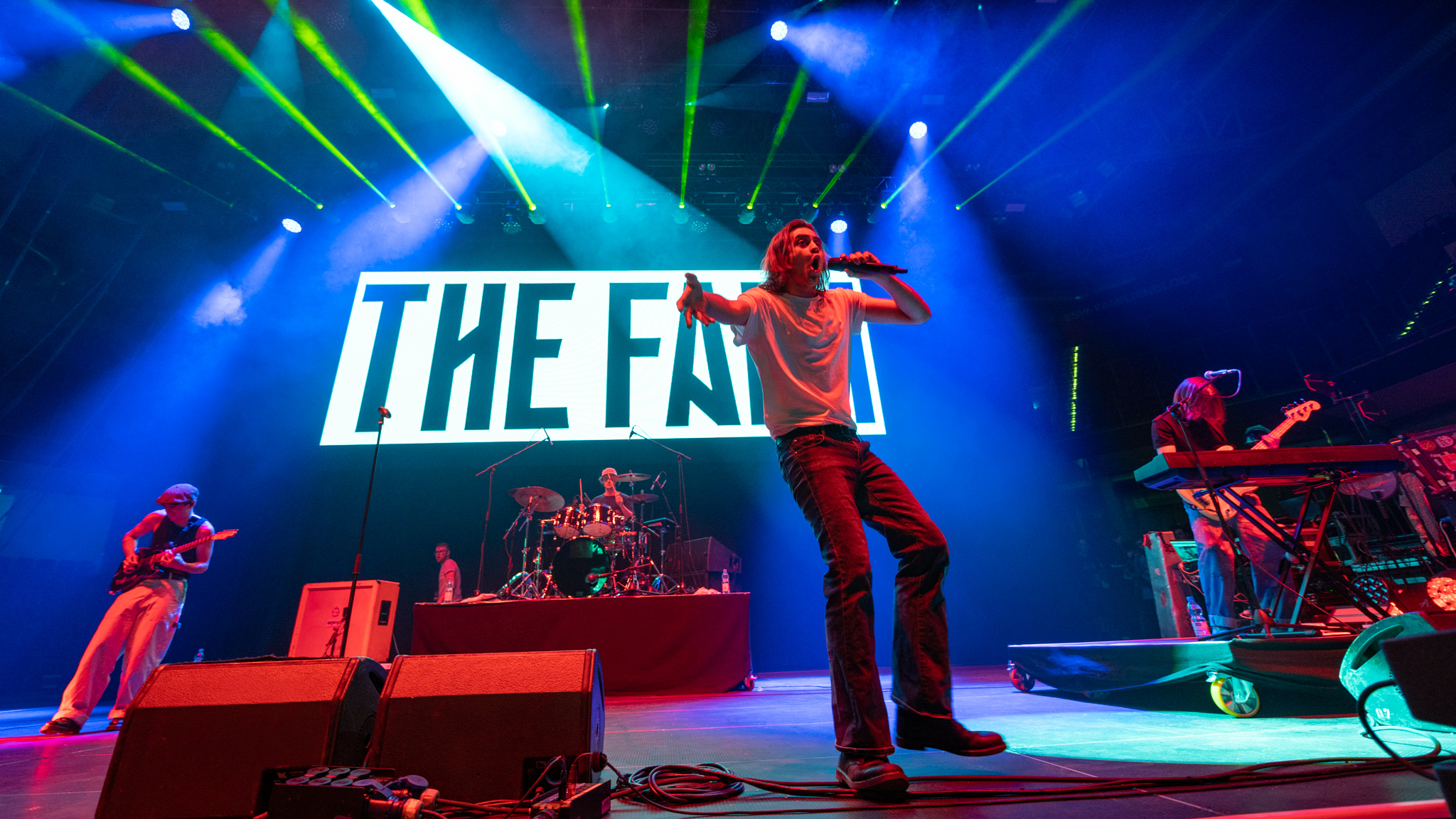
- The Faim performing at Rock im Park 2022 in Nuremberg

Background information
- Origin: Perth, Western Australia, Australia
- Genres: Rock; pop punk; alternative; indie
- Years active: 2014–present
- Label: BMG Rights Management
- Members: Josh Raven; Stephen Beerkens; Samuel Tye; Linden Marissen
- Past members: Sean Tighe; Michael Bono; Sean Van Hengel
- Website: thefaim.com

The Faim are a four-piece band from Perth, Australia. The band consists of singer Josh Raven, bassist/keyboardist Stephen Beerkens, guitarist Samuel Tye and drummer Linden Marissen. The band released their debut EP Summer Is a Curse in 2018 and have signed an international deal with BMG Rights Management.

== History ==
=== 2014–2017: Formation and recognition ===
The band was formed in Perth while some of the group members were still attending high school. They met in their music class and decided to form the band with their previous name being Small Town Heroes. Seven months later Sean joined after they found him on YouTube. Under this moniker, the band recorded and released two EP's in 2015 and 2016. Both releases were produced by Chris Hanssen, who was also the manager for the band between 2015 and 2016.

In late 2016, the band renamed to The Faim and commenced management with Rob Nassif, who is a drummer in the band Gyroscope. Rob discovered The Faim when they were rehearsing at the rehearsal studio he owns, The Hen House Rehearsal Studios.

Following this, the band started to work with John Feldmann, Los Angeles-based producer and lead singer of the band Goldfinger. The band got invited to Los Angeles to make music alongside other producers and songwriters. The band got signed with BMG Rights Management and with the help of Pete Wentz produced their debut single "Saints of the Sinners".

=== 2018–2021: World tours, line-up changes and State of Mind ===
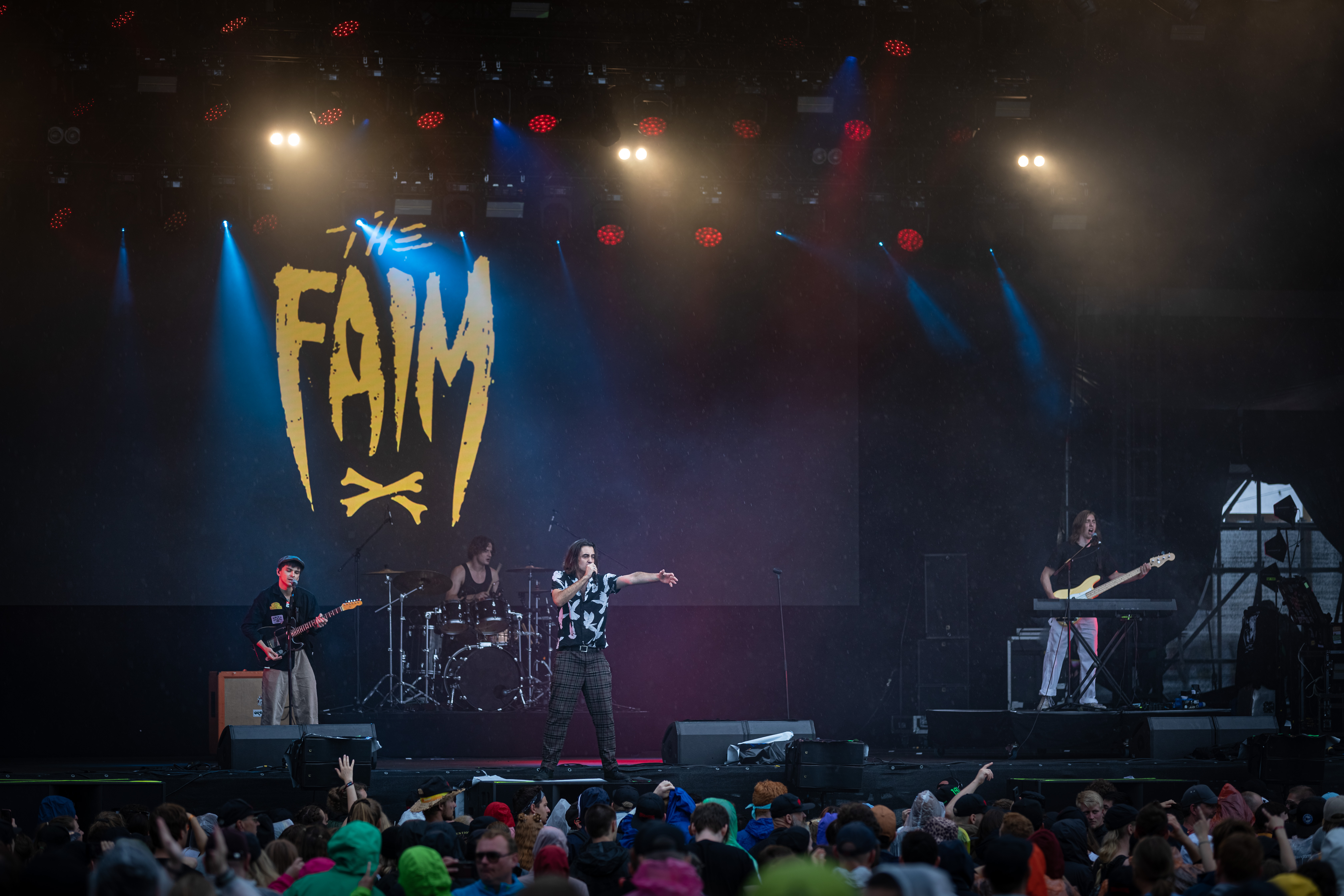
The Faim live at Rock am Ring 2022

At the start of March 2018, The Faim embarked on their first-ever tour. It included 57 shows across 11 weeks playing in 7 different countries including support slots with Lower Than Atlantis across the UK and Sleeping with Sirens and PVRIS across Australia and New Zealand. The band was also invited to perform at the prestigious Download Festival, Slam Dunk Festival, The Great Escape and Liverpool Sound City.

Later in the year, The Faim went on another world tour which included 50 shows across 17 weeks visiting 11 countries. The Faim started out playing at world renowned Reading and Leeds Festival before a three-week promo tour of Germany. The band's single "Summer Is A Curse" made it to No. 12 on the German radio charts, and got featured in France's Jeep advertisement. They were also the supporting artist for Against the Current during their European Tour.

On August 2, 2018, Michael Bono addressed that he will no longer be part of the band due to allegations made against him. On November 28, 2018, Sean Tighe announced his departure to pursue future projects of drumming.

Shortly after, the band headed back to the US for their first ever US tour supporting Hands Like Houses.

At the beginning of 2019, The Faim announced their first headline world tour playing 31 shows across 13 countries. Reception to the tour was massive, with sold-out shows in the UK, Germany, Netherlands and Australia. From April to May, The Faim completed their second US tour as the main support for Andy Black on his US/Canadian spring tour.

Soon after joining the band, drummer Linden Marissen was ecstatic to announce he was endorsing Pearl Drums.

In May 2019, the band announced their world tour "State of Mind" where they would be performing across cities in Australia, UK and Europe, as well as playing at Lollapalooza Berlin, FM4 Frequency Festival and Reading and Leeds Festival once again.

In September 2019, the band released their debut album State of Mind featuring the singles "Summer Is a Curse", "Amelie" and "Humans". In support of the album, the band underwent their first co-headline tour of the US with Australian pop punk band Stand Atlantic.

=== 2022–present: Talk Talk, The Faim in The Hills, and Album Tour ===
On July 8, 2022, the band released their sophomore album, Talk Talk featuring the singles "The Hills", "Era", "Ease My Mind", "Me Because of You" and "The Alchemist".

In the weeks leading up to the release of Talk Talk, Josh Raven and Stephen Beerkens posted short interviews on the band's official YouTube under the title "The Faim in "The Hills" where they discussed the past two years they spent making the album.

On May 6, 2022, the band announced their first Australian tour in 3 years in support of the album. The Australian leg started on July 15 in Perth, before travelling to Brisbane, Newcastle, Sydney, Wollongong, Canberra, Melbourne and Adelaide. Bad Weather and TERRA joined The Faim on Australian Tour as the support acts.

== Members ==
=== Current ===
- Josh Raven – lead vocals (2014–present)
- Stephen Beerkens – bass, keyboard, backing vocals (2014–present)
- Samuel Tye – guitar (2019–present)
- Linden Marissen – drums (2019–present)

=== Former ===
- Michael Bono – bass, guitar, backing vocals (2014–2019)
- Sean Tighe – drums, percussion (2015–2019)
- Sean Van Hengel - drums, percussion (2014–2015)

== Discography ==
=== Studio albums ===
Title	Album details
State of Mind	Released: 13 September 2019; Label: BMG Rights Management; Format: CD, digital download, streaming
Talk Talk	Released: 8 July 2022; Label: BMG Rights Management; Format: CD, digital download, streaming

=== Extended plays ===
Title	Details
Summer Is a Curse	Released: 7 September 2018; Label: BMG Rights Management; Format: Digital download, streaming

=== Singles ===
List of singles
Title	Year	Album
"Saints of the Sinners"	2018	Non-album singles
"Midland Line"	2018	Non-album singles
"Summer Is a Curse"	2018	Summer Is a Curse EP
"A Million Stars"	2018	Summer Is a Curse EP
"Fire"	2019	State of Mind
"Amelie"	2019	State of Mind
"Humans"	2019	State of Mind
"Buying Time"	2020	State of Mind
"Ease My Mind"	2021	Talk Talk
"The Hills"	2022	Talk Talk
"ERA"	2022	Talk Talk
"The Alchemist"	2022	Talk Talk

=== Music videos ===
Year	Video	Director
2018	"Saints of the Sinners"	Jason Eshraghian
2018	"Midland Line"	Sitcom Soldiers
2018	"Summer Is a Curse"	Sitcom Soldiers
2018	"A Million Stars"	
2019	"Fire"	
2019	"Amelie"	
2019	"Humans"	Brume
2020	"Buying Time"	
2022	"Ease My Mind"	Drew Kendell
2022	"The Hills"	Drew Kendell
