= Ashton Irwin =

Australian drummer (born 1994)

- Ashton Irwin at the O2 Arena 2026

Background information
- Born: Ashton Fletcher Irwin; 7 July 1994 (age 32); Hornsby, New South Wales, Australia
- Genres: Pop rock; pop; pop punk; power pop; rock; new wave
- Occupation: Musician
- Instruments: Drums; vocals; Main Rapper
- Years active: 2011–present
- Member of: 5 Seconds of Summer
- Website: ashtonirwinofficial.com

Ashton Fletcher Irwin (born 7 July 1994) is an Australian musician, best known as the drummer of the pop rock band 5 Seconds of Summer. Since 2014, 5 Seconds of Summer have sold more than 10 million albums, sold over 2 million concert tickets worldwide, and the band's songs streams surpass 7 billion, making them one of the most successful Australian musical exports in history.

== Early life ==
Ashton Fletcher Irwin was born on 7 July 1994 in Hornsby, New South Wales. His father, who is an American, left the family when Irwin was two years old. His mother, Anne-Marie, struggled with alcoholism, and as a result, he spent his childhood "hanging out with drunk people at pubs". He later elaborated, "My upbringing is […] interesting, I didn't have a father, my mom has struggled with alcoholism my whole life. I've grown up kind of bringing other people up…I've had to be relentlessly positive, and I have a very depressed mind". Irwin frequently moved houses as a child, mainly residing in Richmond and Windsor. Irwin's mother "didn't have a lot of money" and as a result, Irwin would "struggle to eat from week to week".

Irwin's uncle was a drummer in a death-metal band and his step-father played drums in a punk-rock band. Irwin learned how to play drums at nine years old after asking his step-father to teach him. Irwin helped raise his younger siblings, half-brother Harry and half-sister Lauren, whilst attending Richmond High School, from which he graduated in 2012. During his high school years, prior to the formation of 5 Seconds of Summer, Irwin formed a jazz-funk band called "Swallow the Goldfish" with his classmates. Ultimately departing from the band, Irwin pursued a year of higher education at a TAFE college, studying music, before choosing to leave due to his commitment to 5 Seconds of Summer.

== Career ==
In late 2011, Irwin received a Facebook message from friend and future band-mate, Michael Clifford, asking if Irwin was interested in casually playing music with him, Calum Hood and Luke Hemmings. Irwin agreed, eventually joining the trio in posting song covers on Hemmings' YouTube channel, and forming the 5 Seconds of Summer lineup. After months of posting song covers together, the band began attracting interest from major music labels and publishers and signed a publishing deal with Sony/ATV Music Publishing. Irwin has since released six studio albums with the band, each met with worldwide success: 5 Seconds of Summer (2014), Sounds Good Feels Good (2015), Youngblood (2018), Calm (2020), 5SOS5 (2022), and Everyone's a Star! (2025).

Apart from the band, Irwin has song-written and provided instrumentation for other artists, including Andy Black, The Faim and Makeout.

On 23 September 2020, Irwin announced the release of his debut solo album, titled Superbloom, which was released on 23 October 2020. It was preceded by the single, "Skinny Skinny", a track about issues concerning body image, something Irwin says he has "never confronted in a creative form". Irwin stated that "Superbloom explores my inner philosophies and feelings about the walk of life I have found myself on". He reiterated: "It brings me the greatest joy of all that I am in a band that allows me to create freely inside and outside of it".

In 2024, Irwin announced the release of his second solo album, titled Blood on the Drums, which was released on 17 July 2024. It was preceded by the single, "Straight to Your Heart". The track was described as an ’80s new wave-influenced alt-pop anthem, and was co-written and produced by Irwin in collaboration with John Feldmann. Unlike Superbloom, which was created during the pandemic and focused on personal reflection, Blood on the Drums takes a more outward perspective. Blood on the Drums was released in two parts: the first eight tracks were released digitally on 12 June, with the complete album released on 19 July.

== Personal life ==
Irwin has been open about his struggles with alcoholism and is an advocate for mental health. In 2018, Irwin admitted that during 5 Seconds of Summer's two-year break, he dealt "with [his] feelings in the beginning [of the hiatus] with just alcohol". In April 2020, Irwin revealed that, at the time, he had been sober for ten months. During the band's 2019 tour, Irwin documented, via his social media accounts, ice baths he partook in before each show as an affirmation of overcoming his substance abuse.

Irwin previously dated model Bryana Holly, with the pair dating for a year before splitting in June 2016. In 2018, Irwin began a relationship with fashion blogger and photographer Kaitlin Blaisdell.

In 2017, it was reported that Irwin bought a five-bedroom mansion in the Hollywood Hills neighborhood of Los Angeles. In 2018, it was reported that Irwin had bought a second property, a penthouse, in West Hollywood. As of 2020, Irwin's net-worth is estimated to be $20 million (USD).

== Discography ==
=== Studio albums ===
List of studio albums, with release date and label shown
Title	Album details	Peak chart positions		
Title	Album details	AUS	UK Down.	US Cur.
Superbloom	Released: 23 October 2020; Format: CD, digital download, streaming; Label: AI Music Group	37	36	77
Blood on the Drums	Released: 19 July 2024; Format: vinyl, digital download, streaming; Label: Ashton Irwin Music Group	—	—	—

=== Live albums ===
List of studio albums, with release date and label shown
Title	Album details
Superbloom: A Live Experience	Released: 20 November 2020; Format: CD, digital download, streaming; Label: AI Music Group

=== Singles ===
List of singles, with year released and album shown
Title	Year	Album
"Skinny Skinny"	2020	Superbloom
"Have U Found What Ur Looking For"	2020	Superbloom
"Scar"	2020	Superbloom
"Heart-Shaped Box"	2020	Non-album single
"Straight to Your Heart"	2024	Blood on the Drums
"The Canyon"	2024	Blood on the Drums

=== Songwriting credits ===
Year	Title	Artist	Album	Notes
2016	"Drown Me Out"	Andy Black	The Shadow Side	Composer, drums, percussion, background vocals
2016	"Homecoming King"	Andy Black	The Shadow Side	Composer, drums
2016	"We Don't Have to Dance"	Andy Black	The Shadow Side	Composer, drums
2016	"Ribcage"	Andy Black	The Shadow Side	Composer, drums
2016	"Stay Alive"	Andy Black	The Shadow Side	Composer, drums
2016	"Beautiful Pain"	Andy Black	The Shadow Side	Composer, drums
2016	"Broken Pieces"	Andy Black	The Shadow Side	Composer, drums
2017	"Ride It Out"	Makeout	The Good Life	Composer, drums
2018	"Summer is a Curse"	The Faim	State of Mind	Composer, drums
2019	"The Promise"	Andy Black	The Ghost of Ohio	Composer, drums
2022	"Let Me Let You Go"	One Ok Rock	Luxury Disease	Composer, drums

== Videography ==
=== Music videos ===
Year	Title	Artist	Role
2018	"Valentine"	5 Seconds of Summer	Himself, director
2019	"When I Get Home"	Ivy Levan	Love Interest
2020	"Skinny Skinny"	Ashton Irwin	Himself, director
2024	"Straight to Your Heart"	Ashton Irwin	Himself, co-director
2024	"Canyon"	Ashton Irwin	Himself

== Awards and nominations ==
Year	Award ceremony	Category	Nominee(s)/work(s)	Result	Ref.
2020	MusicRadar	Best Rock Drummers In The World Right Now	Himself	3rd	
