= Hey Violet discography =

Discography of American pop rock band Hey Violet

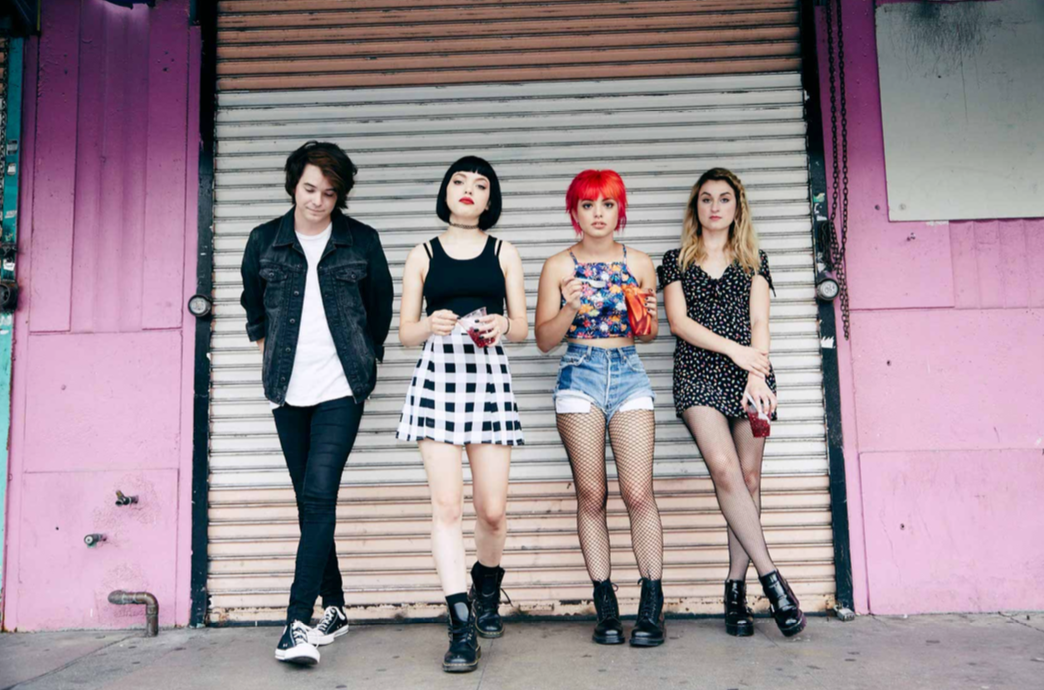
- Hey Violet in January 2016
- Studio albums: 3
- EPs: 6
- Singles: 24
- Music videos: 22

American pop rock band Hey Violet has released two studio albums (plus another under the name Cherri Bomb), five extended plays (plus one additional EP as Cherri Bomb), twenty-four singles, and twenty-two music videos.

== Studio albums ==
List of studio albums, with selected chart positions
Title	Album details	Peak chart positions				
Title	Album details	US	US Heat	US Hard Rock	AUS	BEL (FL)
This Is the End of Control (as Cherri Bomb)	Released: May 15, 2012; Label: Hollywood; Formats: CD, digital download	—	11	24	—	—
From the Outside	Released: June 16, 2017; Label: Hi or Hey, Capitol; Formats: CD, LP, digital download	110	2	—	67	153
Aftertaste	Released: June 28, 2024; Label: Hopeless; Formats: Digital download	—	—	—	—	—

== Extended plays ==
List of extended plays, with selected chart positions
Title	Extended play details	Peak chart positions	
Title	Extended play details	US	US Heat
Stark (as Cherri Bomb)	Released: October 18, 2011; Label: Hollywood; Format: Digital download	—	—
I Can Feel It	Released: July 17, 2015; Label: Hi or Hey, 5Mode, Capitol; Formats: CD, digital download	149	2
Brand New Moves	Released: August 16, 2016; Label: Hi or Hey, 5Mode, Capitol; Formats: CD, digital download	—	—
Problems	Released: June 18, 2021; Label: Self-released; Formats: Digital download	—	—
Deep End	Released: October 22, 2021; Label: Self-released; Formats: Digital download	—	—
Bloom	Released: April 29, 2022; Label: Self-released; Formats: Digital download	—	—

== Singles ==
List of singles, with selected chart positions
Title	Year	Peak chart positions			Album
Title	Year	US	US Pop	AUS	Album
as Cherri Bomb
"Shake the Ground"	2012	—	—	—	This Is the End of Control
"Too Many Faces"	2012	—	—	—	This Is the End of Control
"Better This Way"	2012	—	—	—	This Is the End of Control
as Hey Violet
"This Is Why"	2015	—	—	—	Non-album single
"Brand New Moves"	2016	— (Note: "Brand New Moves" did not enter the Billboard Hot 100, but peaked at number one on the Hot Singles Sales chart.)	—	—	Brand New Moves
"Pure"	2016	—	—	—	Brand New Moves
"Guys My Age"	2016	68	20	78	From the Outside
"Break My Heart"	2017	—	37	—	From the Outside
"Hoodie"	2017	—	33	—	From the Outside
"Better by Myself"	2019	—	—	—	Non-album singles
"Close My Eyes"	2019	—	—	—	Non-album singles
"Queen of the Night"	2019	—	—	—	Non-album singles
"Clean"	2019	—	—	—	Non-album singles
"Friends Like This"	2021	—	—	—	Non-album singles
"Problems"	2021	—	—	—	Problems EP
"Dear Love"	2021	—	—	—	Problems EP
"Party Girl"	2021	—	—	—	Deep End EP
"Bitter Pill"	2021	—	—	—	Deep End EP
"Fall for Me First"	2022	—	—	—	Bloom EP
"I Should Call My Friends"	2023	—	—	—	Aftertaste
"Uncomplicated"	2024	—	—	—	Aftertaste
"Best Imposter"	2024	—	—	—	Aftertaste
"Hazy"	2024	—	—	—	Aftertaste
"Bittersweet"	2024	—	—	—	Non-album single

== Compilations ==
- Hey Violet Sampler CDr (Virgin, 2016)

== Compilation appearances ==
- Now That's What I Call Music! 61 (Sony/Universal, 2017) - "Guys My Age"
- Just The Hits: Girl Power 2XCD (Universal, 2019) - "Better By Myself"

== Music videos ==
List of music videos, showing year released and directors
Title	Year	Director(s)
"The Pretender"	2011	Giles Dunning
"Spin"	2011	Giles Dunning
"Let It Go"	2011	Michael Holyk
"Too Many Faces"	2012	Lisa Mann
"This Is Why"	2015	N/A
"I Can Feel It"	2015	So & So
"Brand New Moves"	2016	Ruth Barrett
"Guys My Age"	2016	Sophia Ray
"Break My Heart"	2017	Jesse Heath; Darren Craig
"O.D.D"	2017	N/A
"Hoodie"	2017	N/A
"Better By Myself"	2019	Marcella Cytrynowicz
"Close My Eyes"	2019	Marcella Cytrynowicz
"Queen Of The Night"	2019	Al Kalyk
"Clean"	2019	Ariel Michelle Lofaro
"Friends Like This"	2021	Ariel Michelle
"Problems" (lyric video)	2021	Marina Piche
"Dear Love"	2021	Hey Violet
"Party Girl"	2021	Hey Violet
"Bitter Pill"	2021	N/A
"I Should Call My Friends"	2023	Joe Striff
"Best Imposter"	2024	Hey Violet
