= Outasight =

American singer-songwriter

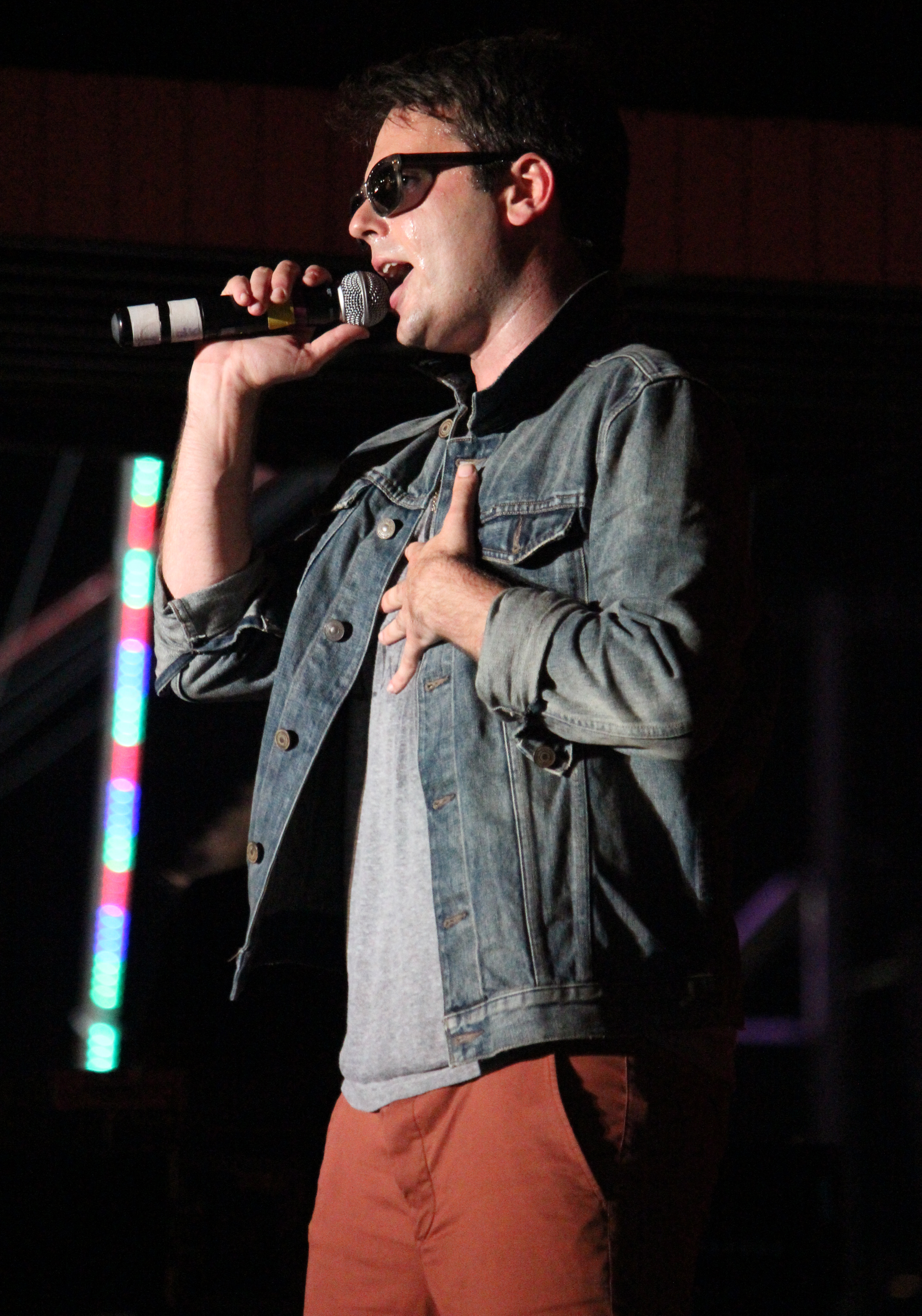
- Outasight performing at the New York State Fair, 2012

Background information
- Born: Richard Andrew Conte; February 17, 1983 (age 43); Yonkers, New York
- Origin: Westchester County, New York, United States
- Genres: Alternative hip hop; pop; rock; soul
- Occupations: Rapper; singer-songwriter; record producer
- Instruments: Vocals, piano, guitar
- Years active: 2007–present
- Labels: RPM MSC; Warner Bros.; Asylum; Lifted Research Group
- Website: www.iamoutasight.com

Richard Andrew Conte (born February 17, 1983), better known by his stage name Outasight, is an American singer-songwriter, rapper, and record producer born and raised in Yonkers, New York. Though he is considered a pop artist, he is influenced by other genres such as hip hop, rock, and soul music.

His debut album, Nights Like These (2012), featured the platinum-selling "Tonight Is The Night". He spent the next few years on the road performing at festivals such as Lollapalooza, Governors Ball, and Vans Warped Tour. His follow up album, Big Trouble, was released in October 2015, which produced the singles "The Wild Life" and "The Boogie". On August 18, 2017, he released his third studio album Richie, with his fourth studio album, Future Vintage Soul, released on October 19, 2018.

== Biography ==
Richard Andrew Conte was born in Yonkers, New York on February 17, 1983. At the age of 9, his father gave him a guitar, and it sparked his interest in becoming a musician. He began writing rhymes and singing around age 10. He attended St. Joseph's School in Bronxville, NY.

=== Early career ===
Outasight began playing shows at small venues in New York City such as the Bowery Poetry Club and the Nuyorican Café. After his first EP release titled Employee of the Year, he played at the 2007 Hip-hop festival alongside major label acts such as Ghostface Killah, Skillz, and Consequence. In June 2008, Outasight released his second promotional CD titled Radio New York. This release saw more commercial success and was featured in XXL Magazine's Soundcheck choice in "Something to Talk About." His music video for the song "Good Evening (Dream Big)" received a video rotation spot on mtvU in the fall of 2008 after winning the 2008 mtvU Freshmen video contest. "Good Evening" was also popularized by its use in Ray William Johnson's YouTube-based vlog series Breaking NYC.

=== 2009–13: Nights Like These ===
In October 2009, Outasight signed with Warner Bros. Records. In December 2009, Lifted Research Group, better known as LRG, sponsored the release of Outasight's Further mixtape. His biggest release to date, Further has generated even more press than the previous two albums. The album was heavily publicized on the internet, garnering strong reviews and also promotion from YouTube celebrity Ray William Johnson. Since then, he has been featured in major media outlets, such as MTV News. On March 23, 2010, Outasight released the Further EP on Asylum Records, and on November 23, 2012, he released his first full-length studio album, Nights Like These. Outasight released a music video for his single "Catch Me If You Can" from the Further EP, which has been featured on numerous hip-hop blogs. Also in 2010, Outasight collaborated with rapper Asher Roth on the "Catch Me If You Can" remix.

Outasight released his first single, "Tonight Is the Night," which was featured on a Pepsi commercial. The commercial includes footage of Michael Jackson, Britney Spears, Mariah Carey, Ray Charles, and Kanye West. Tonight Is The Night was the theme for the 1000th episode of WWE Monday Night RAW.

Outasight performed live at the 2012 NHL All-Star Game in Ottawa, Ontario, where his single "Tonight Is the Night" was the song for the player introductions. On January 17, 2012, Outasight performed his song "Tonight Is the Night" on Late Night with Jimmy Fallon with The Roots. On April 13, 2012, Outasight confirmed via Facebook that his second single from his upcoming debut album would be called "Now or Never" and that it would be out soon. It was released on May 11, 2012. His debut album, Nights Like These, was released on November 23, 2012, and it peaked at No. 13 on the Heatseekers Albums chart.

=== 2014–17: Big Trouble and Richie ===
In 2015, he launched a recording label named RPM MSC in partnership with his management. Outasight's sophomore studio album, Big Trouble, was released on October 23, 2015, through RPM MSC. Its lead single "The Wild Life" was released on July 29, 2015 and featured in the Bud Light Lime & Mountain Dew summer campaigns and several films. His next single, "The Boogie" was selected to be in the "Apple Watch 2" campaign, the opening introduction to the NBA Primetime on ABC, and also the credit song to the box office blockbuster Central Intelligence.

His next single, "Do Something Crazy," was released late summer of 2016. The song was featured in the film (Mike and Dave Need Wedding Dates) along with (The Nut Job 2: Nutty by Nature), (The Secret Life of Pets 2) and the soundtrack to the video game Madden 17.

Outasight released his first single of 2017 on April 7 with "I Got You" and announced his third album was coming in the summer. Four days later, the music video for "I Got You" was released. On June 9, Outsight released the single "Life of the Party" as part of a summer of new music for him. The music video for "Life of the Party" was released on June 30. A week later he dropped his next single, "Feel Good", which features Hoodie Allen.

=== 2018–present: Future Vintage Soul ===
On July 20, 2018, Outasight released the single "Never Get Enough." On August 14, 2018, he announced his fourth studio album, Future Vintage Soul, with a scheduled release date of October 19, 2018. On October 4, he released another new song, titled "Higher." "Higher" was a part of the Forza Horizon 4 Soundtrack. "The Bounce" was revealed to be the theme song for Google Assistant on October 10.

In 2019, Outasight started his record label 83 Sound, partnering with longtime producer Cook Classics.

== Discography ==
=== Studio albums ===
List of studio albums with selected details
Title	Album details
Nights Like These	Released: November 23, 2012; Label: Warner; Format: CD, digital download
Big Trouble	Released: October 23, 2015; Label: RPM MSC; Format: CD, digital download
Richie	Released: August 18, 2017; Label: Seeker Music; Format: Digital download
Future Vintage Soul	Released: October 19, 2018; Label: Slang Music; Format: Digital download
Jamz	Released: July 16, 2021; Label: 83 Sound; Format: Digital download
Banners	Released: August 25, 2023; Label: 83 Sound; Format: Digital download

=== Extended plays ===
List of extended plays with selected details
Title	EP details
Further EP	Released: March 12, 2010; Label: Asylum; Format: Digital download
Figure 8	Released: April 22, 2011; Label: Warner; Format: CD, digital download
Tonight Is the Night + 2 Remixes	Released: January 17, 2012; Label: Warner; Format: Digital download
No Vacancy	Released: December 13, 2019; Label: 83 Sound; Format: Digital download
Standing Ovation	Released: April 21, 2023; Label: 83 Sound; Format: Digital download
Roll Call	Released: June 22, 2023; Label: 83 Sound; Format: Digital download
This Magnificent	Released: June 23, 2023; Label: 83 Sound; Format: Digital download

=== Mixtapes ===
List of mixtapes with selected details
Title	EP details
Employee of the Year	Released: 2007; Label: Self-released; Format: Streaming
Radio New York	Released: June 3, 2008; Label: Self-released; Format: Digital download
From There to Here	Released: March 17, 2009; Label: Self-released; Format: Digital download
Further	Released: December 15, 2009; Label: Lifted Research Group; Format: CD, digital download
Never Say Never	Released: August 17, 2010; Label: Lifted Research Group; Format: CD, digital download
Get It Together	Released: October 14, 2011; Label: Warner; Format: CD, digital download
Stay Gold	Released: July 26, 2013; Label: Self-released; Format: Streaming

=== Singles ===
Title	Year	Peak chart positions							Certifications	Album
Title	Year	US	US Adult	US Dance	US Pop	AUS	BEL (Vl)	CAN	Certifications	Album
"Good Evening"	2008	—	—	—	—	—	—	—		Radio New York
"Catch Me If You Can"	2010	—	—	—	—	—	—	—		Further
"Tonight Is the Night"	2011	38	20	6	14	18	23	53	RIAA: Platinum; ARIA: Platinum	Nights Like These
"Now or Never"	2012	— (Note: "Now or Never" did not enter the Billboard Hot 100, but peaked at number three on the US Bubbling Under Hot 100 chart.)	—	—	26	—	—	—		Nights Like These
"Shine" (featuring Chiddy Bang)	2012	—	—	—	—	—	—	—		Nights Like These
"I'll Drink to That"	2012	—	—	—	—	—	—	—		Nights Like These
"Change the World"	2013	—	—	—	—	—	—	—		Non-album singles
"Anchor Down"	2014	—	—	—	—	—	—	—		Non-album singles
"Automatic"	2014	—	—	—	—	—	—	—		Non-album singles
"The Wild Life"	2015	—	—	—	—	—	—	—		Big Trouble
"Big Trouble"	2015	—	—	—	—	—	—	—		Big Trouble
"Back to Life"	2015	—	—	—	—	—	—	—		Big Trouble
"The Boogie"	2015	—	—	—	—	—	—	—		Big Trouble
"Do Something Crazy" (featuring Cook Classics)	2016	—	—	—	—	—	—	—		Non-album single
"I Got You"	2017	—	—	—	—	—	—	—		Richie
"Life of the Party"	2017	—	—	—	—	—	—	—		Richie
"Feel Good" (featuring Hoodie Allen)	2017	—	—	—	—	—	—	—		Richie
"Ny 2 La"	2017	—	—	—	—	—	—	—		Richie
"Still Young"	2017	—	—	—	—	—	—	—		Richie
"Eye Candy" (featuring Ellis!)	2017	—	—	—	—	—	—	—		Non-album singles
"Jordan Jump" (with Academy and Evan Gartner)	2018	—	—	—	—	—	—	—		Non-album singles
"Never Get Enough"	2018	—	—	—	—	—	—	—		Future Vintage Soul
"The Bounce"	2018	—	—	—	—	—	—	—		Future Vintage Soul
"Extra Special"	2018	—	—	—	—	—	—	—		Future Vintage Soul
"Higher"	2018	—	—	—	—	—	—	—		Future Vintage Soul
"Attention"	2019	—	—	—	—	—	—	—		No Vacany
"Fire It Up"	2019	—	—	—	—	—	—	—		No Vacany
"Better"	2019	—	—	—	—	—	—	—		No Vacany
"Play the Drums"	2019	—	—	—	—	—	—	—		No Vacany
"Notorious" (with Santino)	2020	—	—	—	—	—	—	—		Non-album singles
"Can't Help Myself"	2020	—	—	—	—	—	—	—		Non-album singles
"Say Hey"	2020	—	—	—	—	—	—	—		Jamz
"In the House"	2020	—	—	—	—	—	—	—		Jamz
"Whoa!"	2020	—	—	—	—	—	—	—		Jamz
"Runnin' Wild"	2020	—	—	—	—	—	—	—		Jamz
"LHSF (Let's Have Some Fun)"	2020	—	—	—	—	—	—	—		Jamz
"Sinatra"	2021	—	—	—	—	—	—	—		Jamz
"All Time Fave"	2021	—	—	—	—	—	—	—		Jamz
"Too Much"	2021	—	—	—	—	—	—	—		Jamz
"Get Some"	2021	—	—	—	—	—	—	—		Jamz
"From the Jump" (with Le Cashe and Nicky Blitz)	2021	—	—	—	—	—	—	—		Non-album single
"Golden"	2022	—	—	—	—	—	—	—		Banners
"Real Good"	2022	—	—	—	—	—	—	—		Banners
"Feels Like"	2023	—	—	—	—	—	—	—		Banners
"Standing Ovation"	2023	—	—	—	—	—	—	—		Banners
"Roll Call"	2023	—	—	—	—	—	—	—		Banners
"This Magnificent"	2023	—	—	—	—	—	—	—		Banners
"Primetime" (with Easy McCoy)	2023	—	—	—	—	—	—	—		Non-album singles
"Forever Glow"	2023	—	—	—	—	—	—	—		Non-album singles
"Back to Back" (with Easy McCoy)	2023	—	—	—	—	—	—	—		Non-album singles
"My Kinda Holiday"	2023	—	—	—	—	—	—	—		Non-album singles
"Wow"	2024	—	—	—	—	—	—	—		Non-album singles
"All I Wanna Do"	2024	—	—	—	—	—	—	—		Non-album singles
"We On Top" (with Easy McCoy)	2024	—	—	—	—	—	—	—		Non-album singles
"Turn Me Loose"	2024	—	—	—	—	—	—	—		Non-album singles
"—" denotes a title that did not chart, or was not released in that territory.

== Videography ==
- "Catch Me If You Can" (March 25, 2010)
- "Losing My Mind" (January 19, 2011)
- "It's Like That" (February 27, 2011)
- "So What" (April 13, 2011)
- "Figure 8" (August 8, 2011)
- "Tonight is the Night" (November 9, 2011)
- "Now or Never" (September 17, 2012)
- "Shine" (October 16, 2012)
- "Tapedeck Blues" (September 11, 2013)
- "Anchor Down" (July 29, 2014)
- "The Wild Life" (July 29, 2015)
- "The Boogie" (April 21, 2016)
- "I Got You" (April 11, 2017)
- "Life of the Party" (June 30, 2017)

== Songwriter ==
- Jacob Banks "Part Time Love"
- Max Frost "Adderrall"
- Hoodie Allen "Believe"
- Hoodie Allen "Ain't Ready"
