= Bevacqua =

Bevacqua is a last name of Italian and French origin. It literally means "water drinker", and was used to refer to a teetotaller. Notable people with the surname include:

- Daniel Bevilacqua, singer and musician better known as Christophe (1945–2020)
- Jonas Bevacqua (1977–2011), founder of Lifted Research Group
- Julio Bevacqua (born 1980), footballer
- Kurt Bevacqua (born 1947), former baseball player
