= Further =

Further or furthur, alternatively farther, may refer to:

- Furthur (bus), the Merry Pranksters' psychedelic bus
- Further (band), a 1990s American indie rock band
- Further Roman a way of trading
- Furthur (band), a band formed in 2009 by Bob Weir and Phil Lesh
- Further (The Chemical Brothers album), 2010
- Further (Flying Saucer Attack album), 1995
- Further (Geneva album), 1997, and a song from the album
- Further (Richard Hawley album), 2019
- Further (Solace album), 2000
- Further (Outasight album), 2009
- "Further" (VNV Nation song), a song by VNV Nation
- "Further", a song by Longview from the album Mercury, 2003
- Further Triennial, an announced contemporary art triennial focusing on Northern California artists, debuting in 2027
