= 808: The Music =

Soundtrack album and remix album by Various artists
- Released: November 25, 2016
- Genre: Soundtrack; electronic
- Length: 69:33
- Label: Big Beat; Atlantic

Singles from 808: The Music
- 1. "Nothing but Trouble" Released: June 30, 2015

808: The Music is the soundtrack and remix album that accompanies the 2015 documentary film, 808, which documents the history and popular culture of the Roland TR-808. It was released on November 25, 2016, by Big Beat Records and Atlantic Records.

It was promoted with a promotional single: "Nothing but Trouble" by American rapper Lil Wayne and American singer Charlie Puth, and was released on June 30, 2015.

== History ==
Alongside the announcement of the documentary film, 808, in October 2014, a soundtrack accompaniment was also announced, in which Big Beat Records and Atlantic Records would distribute the label. On June 30, 2015, Lil Wayne and Charlie Puth announced and released "Nothing but Trouble", a promotional single for the film on Big Beat/Atlantic. The album was then released on November 25, 2016.

== Track listing ==
| No. | Title | Writer(s) | Producer(s) | Length |
|---|---|---|---|---|
| 1. | "Planet Rock" | Arthur Baker; John Robie; Afrika Bambaataa & the Soulsonic Force; Ralf Hütter; Florian Schneider | Arthur Baker; John Robie | 5:19 |
| 2. | "Paul Revere" | Adam Horovitz; Joseph Simmons; Darryl McDaniels; Rick Rubin | Rick Rubin; Beastie Boys | 3:43 |
| 3. | "Yo! Bum Rush the Show" | Chuck D; Flavor Flav; Hank Shocklee | Rick Rubin; Bill Stephney; The Bomb Squad | 4:26 |
| 4. | "Hip Hop, Be Bop (Don't Stop)" | Man Parrish | Man Parrish | 5:41 |
| 5. | "Play at Your Own Risk" | Arthur Baker; John Robie | Arthur Baker; John Robie | 7:50 |
| 6. | "Let the Music Play" | Chris Barbosa; Ed Chisolm | Mark Liggett; Chris Barbosa | 5:47 |
| 7. | "Set It Off" | Steve Standard | George Logios | 4:48 |
| 8. | "It's Yours" | Kevin Keaton; Rick Rubin | Rick Rubin | 4:23 |
| 9. | "Flow Coma" | 808 State | 808 State | 6:01 |
| 10. | "Kickdrum" | Felix da Housecat | Felix da Housecat | 3:50 |
| 11. | "What U Gon' Do" | Darryl Richardson; Jonathan Smith; Sammie Norris | Lil Jon | 5:23 |
| 12. | "Vibrate" | Flux Pavilion | Flux Pavilion | 3:54 |
| 13. | "Gosh" | Jamie Smith | Jamie xx | 4:51 |
| 14. | "Nothing but Trouble" | Dwayne Michael Carter; Charles Otto Puth; Will Lobban-Bean | Cook Classics; Charlie Puth | 3:37 |
| Total length: | | | | 69:33 |

== Charts ==
| Chart (2016) | Peak position |
|---|---|
| United States Dance/Electronic Albums Chart | 14 |
