= Break Your Heart (disambiguation) =

"Break Your Heart" is a 2009 Taio Cruz song.

Break Your Heart may also refer to:

- "Break Your Heart" (Natalie Merchant song), 1998
- "Break Your Heart", a Trixie Mattel song from One Stone, 2018
- "Break Your Heart", a Todrick Hall song from Forbidden, 2018

== See also ==
- Break My Heart (disambiguation)
