= Nights Like These (album) =

Studio album by Outasight
- Released: November 23, 2012
- Recorded: 2011–2012
- Genre: Pop rap
- Length: 36:02
- Label: Warner
- Producers: Cook Classics; Adam Young; Andrew Goldstein; Sterling Fox; Big Jerm; E. Dan; The Futuristics

Outasight chronology
Figure 8 (2011)	Nights Like These (2012)	Big Trouble (2015)

Singles from Nights Like These
- 1. "Tonight Is the Night" Released: September 23, 2011; 2. "Now or Never" Released: May 11, 2012; 3. "Shine" Released: October 12, 2012; 4. "I'll Drink to That" Released: November 12, 2012

Nights Like These is the debut studio album by American singer-songwriter and rapper Outasight. The album was released on November 23, 2012, via Warner Records. The album contains the platinum-selling single, "Tonight Is the Night", as well as three other singles, "Now or Never", "Shine" and "I'll Drink To That".

== Background ==
In 2008, Outasight was in talks with signing with different labels, before signing with Warner Records in 2009. He released the EP, Figure 8 in 2011, under the label in support of his forthcoming major label debut. He was named as one of the "New Faces 2012" by Rolling Stone in February 2012, following the success of his lead single, "Tonight Is the Night".

== Composition ==
Nights Like These consists of 10 tracks, produced by Cook Classics, Adam Young of Owl City, Andrew Goldstein, Sterling Fox, Big Jerm, E. Dan and The Futuristics. Richard Conte of Outasight worked on the album a year before its release and when the label approached him to put the album together, he chose 10 songs that "made the most sense and went for it." Conte wanted to "create an album that felt both cohesive" with the single, "Tonight Is the Night" and to showcase more aspects of his songwriting and performance abilities.

The album is described as a pop rap album, blending in styles of hip hop, pop rock and dance music. Tracks such as "Shine" and "Perfect Words" mixes the genres of hip hop and pop music, while "Ready Set Go" is considered as dance pop. The singles "Tonight Is the Night" and "Now or Never" are described as electropop.

Conte spoke about the album in retrospect in a 2016 interview, calling it "a record industry nightmare." He revealed he had done the album four times over and the label never released it, until they decided to give him two months to the select the final track listing, before releasing the album. He felt that this process "has hurt me more than helped" as an artist. He also found it "very hard to quantify" what he made.

== Release ==
Outasight released the album's lead single, "Tonight Is the Night" on September 23, 2011. The song peaked at number 38 on the Billboard Hot 100 and was certified platinum by the Recording Industry Association of America. The song was featured in various commercials, including Pepsi's "Who's Next" campaign. "Now or Never" was released on May 11, 2012, as the album's second single. The song reached number three on the US Bubbling Under Hot 100 chart. "Shine" was released on October 12, 2012, as the third single from the album and features Chiddy Bang. A music video for the single premiered on October 16. The fourth and final single, "I'll Drink to That" was released on November 12, 2012. The music video premiered via Billboard on February 14, 2013. Nights Like These was streamed exclusively via Complex and Rolling Stone on November 20, 2012, before it was officially released on November 23, for digital download.

Prior to the release of Nights Like These, Outasight joined 3OH!3 and Sammy Adams on tour in promotion of the album's upcoming release, as well as supporting Cobra Starship on the Lights, Camera and Music tour. He also embarked on a co-headling tour with the Ready Set in February 2013, in support of the album.

== Critical reception ==
Professional ratings
Review scores
Source	Rating
AllMusic	2/5 stars
PopMatters	4/10 stars

Tim Sendra of AllMusic gave the album a mixed review stating, "Andrew channels the tunefully breezy songcraft of Bruno Mars, the bleary frat rap of Asher Roth, the giddy freedom of Chiddy Bang, the thudding club beats used by everyone from Taio Cruz to Usher, and the dramatic techno buildups that Calvin Harris should have trademarked." He felt that the melodies were "hand-me-downs" and that his voice "isn't distinctive in any way." However, he praised the single, "Shine", describing it as "one of the record's best tracks."

Brent Faulkner of PopMatters also gave a mixed review remarking, "he attempts to balance eclecticism, ultimately delivering an album flawed by clichés and lack of his own signature individuality. Sound production work and catchy choruses help to salvage the effort somewhat." He complimented the singles, "Shine" that "feels more of a natural fit," and "Tonight Is the Night" as "a necessary lift." However, he overall stated, "Nights Like These suffers from a lack of differentiation, variation and overindulgence in trendiness. Outasight attempts to establish artistry based on current trends as opposed to paving his own way to create a distinct pop-rap album. Unfortunately for OU, Nights Like These fails to show enough flashes of individuality, brilliance, and distinction from counterparts and other artists. Because of shortcomings, the effort disappoints more than it triumphs."

Rolling Stone gave a positive review for the album noting, "Outasight knows a good time, and on his fun-loving debut record Nights Like These, the Yonkers, New York, native has a blast mixing pop, rock and rap into a potent cocktail." Darren Collins of The Music stated, "'Tonight Is the Night' has been the perfect vehicle for introducing Outasight to the FM dial, a mix of big-room beats and catchy hooks, and almost the entire second half of Nights Like These is devoted to this sound... However, despite its presentation and often shallow, hedonistic nature, the old Outasight can still be heard in the first half of the set, with 'Shine', 'I'll Drink To That'... Nights Like These may not be the real Outasight yet it remains Outasight and hopefully gives the man the opportunity to gain more creative control over his future projects."

== Track listing ==
All tracks are written by Richard Andrew Conte and William Lobban Bean.

No.	Title	Writer(s)	Producer(s)	Length
1.	"Let's Go"	Richard Andrew Conte, Joel van Dijk, William Lobban Bean	Cook Classics	3:57
2.	"Shine" (featuring Chiddy Bang)	Conte, Chidera Anamege, Jeremy Kulousek, E. Dan	Big Jerm, E. Dan	3:36
3.	"I'll Drink to That"	Conte, Sterling Fox	Fox	3:12
4.	"Perfect Words"	Conte, Joe Khajadourian, Alex Schwartz	The Futuristics	3:56
5.	"Ready Set Go"		Cook Classics	3:26
6.	"If I Fall Down"	Conte, Adam Young	Young	3:24
7.	"Tonight Is the Night"		Cook Classics	3:08
8.	"Under Lock and Key" (featuring RJ)		Cook Classics	4:01
9.	"Now or Never"	Conte, Kara DioGuardi, Jeffrey Fenster, Andrew Goldstein	Goldstein	3:39
10.	"Nights Like These"		Cook Classics	3:48
Total length:				38:52

== Personnel ==
Credits for Nights Like These adapted from album's liner notes.

- Richard Andrew Conte – composer, lyricist, primary artist
- Cook Classics – producer (1, 5, 7, 8, 10), composer, lyricist, keyboards, programming
- Chiddy Bang – featured artist (2)
- RJ – featured artist (8)
- Hubie Wang – guitar (5, 10)
- Shiben Bhattacharya – bass guitar (1, 10)
- Zach Rudolph – bass guitar (5)
- Peter Dyer – keyboard (5, 8, 10)
- E. Dan – producer (2)
- Big Jerm – producer (2)
- Sterling Fox – producer (3)
- The Futuristics – producer (4)
- Adam Young – producer (6)
- Andrew Goldstein – producer, programming, instrumentation (9)
- Matthew Masurka – co-producer (7)
- Ari Levine – mixing (1)
- Dave Schiffman – mixing (3, 5, 8, 10)
- Dana Nielsen – mixing (4)
- Andrew Dawson – mixing (6)
- Serban Ghenea – mixing (7, 9)
- Justin Smith – mastering (1)
- Tal Miller – mastering (3-10)
- Zach Gurka – recording (4)
- Tom Gardner – recording (5, 9)
- John Hanes – mixing engineer (7, 9)
- Phil Seaford – assistant mixing engineer (7, 9)

== Charts ==
Chart performance for Nights Like These
Chart (2012)	Peak position
US Heatseekers Albums (Billboard)	13

== Release history ==
Release dates and formats for Nights Like These
Region	Date	Format(s)	Label	Ref.
Various	November 23, 2012	Digital download	Warner	
Various	November 27, 2012	CD	Warner	
