= Now or Never (Outasight song) =

Single by Outasight

from the album Nights Like These
- Released: May 11, 2012
- Recorded: 2011
- Genre: Electropop; dance-pop; pop rap
- Length: 3:37
- Label: Warner Bros. Records
- Songwriters: Richard Andrew Conte; Kara DioGuardi; Jeffrey Fenster; Andrew Goldstein
- Producer: Goldstein

Outasight singles chronology
"Tonight Is the Night" (2011)	"Now or Never" (2012)	"Shine" (2012)

Music video
- "Now or Never" on YouTube

"Now or Never" is a song by American singer-songwriter Outasight. It was released on May 11, 2012, as the second single from his debut studio album, Nights Like These, via Warner Bros. Records. The music video was released to YouTube on September 17, 2012. It was also the official theme song for WWE's 2012 Survivor Series.

== Background ==
"Now or Never" was released for streaming on April 24, 2012, via SoundCloud. The song was officially released as the second single from Nights Like These on May 11, 2012.

In October 2012, students of Samford University posted a lip-dub video of the song, recorded at Pete Hanna Center.

== Composition ==
The song was written by Richard Andrew Conte, Kara DioGuardi and Jeffrey Fenster, while production was handled by Andrew Goldstein, who also co-wrote the track. The song has been described as electropop, dance pop and pop rap.

== Critical reception ==
Jenna Hally Rubenstein of MTV stated that the song, "is the kind of jam that can carry you through a long drive with the top down... Set to a synth-laden, high-energy dance track, the tune begins with O's infectious vocals." William Goodman of CBS News complimented the track with a review title of "Great music meets inspiring moments..." and called the tune "upbeat and catchy." Hypebeast described the track as "an infectious mix of electronic flavor and his accustomed vocals."

== Music video ==
The music video for "Now or Never" was released on September 17, 2012, via YouTube. Directed by Isaac Ravishankara, the video was shot in the summer in New Jersey.

== Charts ==
Chart performance for "Now or Never"
Chart (2012)	Peak position
US Bubbling Under Hot 100 Singles (Billboard)	3
US Pop Airplay (Billboard)	26

== Release history ==
Release dates and formats for "Now or Never"
Region	Date	Format	Label(s)	Ref.
United States	May 8, 2012	Mainstream airplay	Warner Bros.	
