= Break My Heart =

Break My Heart may refer to:

- "Break My Heart" (Hilary Duff song) (2005)
- "Break My Heart" (Victoria Duffield song) (2012)
- "Break My Heart" (Estelle song) (2011)
- "Break My Heart" (Todrick Hall song) (2018)
- "Break My Heart" (Hey Violet song) (2017)
- "Break My Heart" (Dua Lipa song) (2020)
- "Break My Heart" (Malcolm Middleton song) (2005)
- "Break My Heart" (The Drums song) (2014)
- "Break My Heart (You Really)", a 1988 song by Shakespears Sister

== See also ==
- "Break Your Heart", a 2009 song by Taio Cruz
- "Un-Break My Heart", a 1996 song by Toni Braxton
