= Tonight Is the Night (Outasight song) =

2011 single by Outasight

Single by Outasight

from the album Nights Like These
- B-side: "Stays the Same"
- Released: September 23, 2011
- Genre: Dance-pop; pop rap
- Length: 3:10
- Label: Warner Bros.
- Songwriters: Richard Andrew Conte; William Lobban Bean
- Producer: Cook Classics

Outasight singles chronology
"Catch Me If You Can" (2010)	"Tonight Is the Night" (2011)	"Now or Never" (2012)

Music video
- "Tonight Is the Night" on YouTube

"Tonight Is the Night" is a song by American singer-songwriter Outasight. It was released on September 23, 2011, as the lead single from his debut studio album, Nights Like These. The song was released by Warner Bros. Records and was produced by Cook Classics. The song peaked at number 38 on the US Billboard Hot 100 and was certified platinum by the Recording Industry Association of America. The song also reached number 18 in Australia and number 53 in Canada.

== Composition ==
"Tonight Is the Night" was written by Richard Andrew Conte and produced by Cook Classics, who also co-wrote the track.

== Critical reception ==
Brent Faulkner of PopMatters stated that the song, "benefits from its healthy balance of pop, dance, and pop-rap." He praised its "focused attention to detail and nuance" that shaped the song's success, despite its predictability. Scott Shetler of PopCrush gave a positive review on the Varsity Team Mixshow remix of the song, remarking, "The remix adds electronic elements to the infectious dance-pop track but keeps the fun vibe of the tune intact." Shahryar Rizvi of Dallas Observer noted that the track "has the '80s throwback sound that indie pop started channeling two years ago." He criticized Outasight's "desperate" attempt to "sound urban," and felt that he "isn't used to challenging himself to make good music just yet."

== Chart performance ==
"Tonight Is the Night" sold over 10,000 copies in October 2011, after it was added to Mainstream Top 40 radio. The song debuted at number 96 on the Billboard Hot 100. The song peaked at number 38 on the Hot 100 and has sold 1.1 million copies in the US. The song was certified platinum by the Recording Industry Association of America in August 2012.

== Music video ==
The music video for "Tonight Is the Night" premiered via MTV on November 9, 2011. The music video was directed by Dori Oskowitz and was filmed in New York City.

== Live performances ==
Outasight performed the track on The X Factor in November 2011. He made an appearance on the American TV series, 90210, performing the song. He performed the song on Late Night With Jimmy Fallon, as well as at the 2012 NHL All-Star Game. In September 2012, Outasight performed the song on the American game show, Oh Sit!.

== Use in advertisements ==
The song was used in advertisements for the premiere of the Australian reality show The Shire and in commercials for the 84th Academy Awards on ABC, and was the theme song for WWE's Raw 1000 on July 23, 2012, a version of the song by CFO$ would be used until June 2016. Honda uses this song in TV advertisements for its Summer Clearance Event. It is also used in Pizza Hut commercials. The song was added on Good Morning America's Top 10 playlist by DJ Kiss.

The track is used in Pepsi's "Who's Next" campaign. The advertisement shows an anonymous young singer sipping from a Pepsi can while he is preparing for his show. While the song is being played, renowned "icon" singers appear, in order of appearance Michael Jackson, Alfonso Ribeiro, Ray Charles, Britney Spears, Kanye West and Mariah Carey. The final shot goes back to the new aspiring artist while "who's next?" slogan is splashed on the screen. The advertisement ends with the catch phrase: "Where there's Pepsi, there's music".

== Track listing ==
CD single
No.	Title	Length
1.	"Tonight Is the Night"	3:10

Digital download
No.	Title	Length
1.	"Tonight Is the Night"	3:10
2.	"Stays the Same"	3:50
Total length:		7:00

Remixes EP
No.	Title	Length
1.	"Tonight Is the Night" (Oliver Twizt remix)	5:12
2.	"Tonight Is the Night" (Captain Cuts remix)	6:02
3.	"Stays the Same" (Canblaster & Myd remix)	4:00
4.	"Figure 8" (DiscoTech remix)	3:59

== Charts ==
Chart performance for "Tonight Is the Night"
Chart (2011–2012)	Peak position
Australia (ARIA)	18
Belgium (Ultratip Bubbling Under Flanders)	23
Canada (Canadian Hot 100)	53
US Billboard Hot 100 (Billboard)	38
US Adult Pop Airplay (Billboard)	20
US Dance/Mix Show Airplay (Billboard)	17
US Dance Club Songs (Billboard)	6
US Pop Airplay (Billboard)	14

== Certifications ==
Region	Certification	Certified units/sales
Australia (ARIA)	Platinum	70,000^{^}
United States (RIAA)	Platinum	1,000,000^{*}
^{*} Sales figures based on certification alone.^{^} Shipments figures based on certification alone.

== Release history ==
Release dates and formats for "Tonight Is the Night"
Region	Date	Format	Label(s)	Ref.
United States	October 25, 2011	Mainstream airplay	Warner Bros.	
