= Further (Outasight album) =

Extended play by Outasight

Mixtape by Outasight
- Released: 2009
- Genre: Hip hop
- Length: 53:55
- Label: Lifted Research Group, Warner Bros., Asylum

Outasight chronology
From There to Here (2009)	Further (2009)	Never Say Never (2010)

Further is the third mixtape released by American recording artist Outasight. It was released in 2009, by Lifted Research Group during autumn of 2009 and then re-released by Asylum Records on March 19, 2010. The re-released extended play version included songs from the original mixtape as well as an extra song titled "Favors", recorded in the run up to the EP release.

== Track listing ==
All tracks are written by Richard Andrew.

Version released by Lifted Research Group
No.	Title	Length
1.	"Further/Everything's Alright"	2:48
2.	"Catch Me If You Can"	4:06
3.	"Don't Say Anything"	3:38
4.	"Help!"	3:33
5.	"Brand New Day"	4:31
6.	"Downtown in My Mind"	4:21
7.	"Everyone Gets Laid"	4:56
8.	"The Walk of Shame"	2:16
9.	"3 Cheers Forever"	3:11
10.	"Celebration"	3:19
11.	"Stranger Than Fiction"	4:30
12.	"Better Late Than Never"	4:32
13.	"Here We Go Again"	5:36
14.	"The Introduction"	2:45
Total length:		53:55

All tracks are written by Richard Andrew.

Version released by Asylum Records
No.	Title	Length
1.	"Catch Me If You Can"	4:08
2.	"Don't Say Anything"	4:06
3.	"Favors"	3:42
4.	"Better Late Than Never"	4:34
5.	"Stranger Than Fiction"	4:29
6.	"Brand New Day"	4:30
Total length:		42:51
