= Nothing but Trouble (song) =

Promotional single by Lil Wayne and Charlie Puth

from the album 808: The Music
- Released: June 29, 2015
- Recorded: 2015
- Genre: Hip hop; R&B; electro
- Length: 3:38
- Label: Big Beat; Atlantic
- Songwriters: Dwayne Michael Carter; Charles Otto Puth; Will Lobban-Bean; prev
- Producers: Cook Classics; Puth

"Nothing but Trouble" is a song by American rapper Lil Wayne and American singer-songwriter Charlie Puth, released on June 29, 2015, by Big Beat Records and Atlantic Records for 808: The Music. It is the first promotional single to the soundtrack of the documentary, 808: The Film, directed by Alexander Dunn, which is about the inspiring story of the Roland TR-808 drum machine. The song appeared on iTunes and Spotify on June 30. The song is a warning about the danger that comes with Instagram models.

== Background ==
In an interview with Complex with Zach Frydenlund, Puth spoke about the making of the song: "My idea to make this record started when my friend from Berklee sent me a video of an old Baptist choir singing these insane, huge harmonies. That inspired the choir like theme throughout the song. It's actually one hundred twenty-five tracks of my voice layered to sound like a choir. My friend at the same time was dating this model from New York City who was always messing with his head. After they broke up he would always see her face on billboards. It really upset him. One night we were at a 7-Eleven in New Jersey talking about the situation in the car, and I just blurted out, "Man, these Instagram models are nothing but trouble". I went home that same night and recorded the chorus over that choir beat I made. Then Wayne took it and put a brilliant spin on it and drew inspiration from his own experience I'm sure. Wayne is such a genius with his wordplay. I still can't believe I collaborated on a song with him with an idea that started at 7-Eleven."

== Promotion ==
The snippet was released on June 27th. On June 29, 2015, at 2:41 AM, right before the song was released, Puth tweeted about the song, "when this shit with wayne drops tuesday, it's gonna be a movie...goodnight".

== Critical reception ==
"Nothin but Trouble" received critical acclaim from music critics, who particularly lauded the vocal performances of Wayne and Puth. Tom Breiham of Stereogum said, "The song would count as a bluesy relationship track, but "bluesy" does not begin to take into account the lighter-than-air hook from Charlie Puth...". Ryan Middleton of Music Times said, "The pair may have a new hit on their hand with a very topical theme and the softness of Puth's voice blends very well with Weezy's nasally flow. The beat brings everything together nicely. Michael Powell of RevCutt said, "Now, it's easy to predict after hearing that very uninteresting song that "Nothing but Trouble" would follow suit and be prepped to be just something that's for the airwaves. Yet, that is false, yes this is a song that will get radio play and may even climb the charts. But, it wasn't designed and structured for that purpose. Charlie Puth in a way reminds me of a Robin Thicke in the connection and chemistry he seems to have with Wayne throughout this track. The chorus is hypnotizing and will lead you to want to replay the song again and again. While Wayne again leaves a lasting impression, with a verse and story about how the female he’s fallen for only wants more fame and Instagram followers. I don't know if we will, but hopefully we get to see more of the Charlie Puth and Lil Wayne collaborations because the one they have is already looking to have a beautiful future.

== Music video ==
The song's accompanying music video premiered on August 24, 2015, via Apple Music.

== Track listing ==
Digital download
No.	Title	Writer(s)	Producer(s)	Length
1.	"Nothing But Trouble"	Dwayne Michael Carter; Charles Otto Puth; Will Lobban-Bean	Cook Classics; Charlie Puth	3:38

== Charts ==
Chart (2015)	Peak position
US Billboard Hot 100	86
US Rhythmic Airplay (Billboard)	7

== Release history ==
Region	Date	Format	Label
United States	June 29, 2015	Digital download	Big Beat Records; Atlantic Records

== Covers, samples and remixes ==
English house music producer Michael Woods' side project Offaiah sampled this song directly in his house track "Trouble", which reached number 29 in the UK Singles Chart in September 2016.

A remixed version of the song was released on the deluxe version of Puth's debut album, Nine Track Mind, on November 11, 2016.
