= Leaving Home EP =

EP by T. Mills
- Released: January 13, 2012
- Recorded: 2011
- Genre: Minimal pop; alternative hip hop; synthpop
- Label: Columbia
- Producer: Sir Nolan; Jerrod Bettis; Colin Munroe; The Futuristics; FultonYard; Jai-Dig; The Stereotypes

T. Mills chronology
Ready, Fire, Aim (2010)	Leaving Home EP (2012)	All I Wanna Do (2014)

Singles from Leaving Home EP
- 1. "Vans On" Released: December 12, 2011

Leaving Home EP is the major label debut extended play (EP) by American recording artist T. Mills. It was released for the retail sales on January 13, 2012, by Columbia Records. The production on this project was handled by Omen, Colin Munroe and The Stereotypes, among others. Leaving Home EP was supported by the lead single "Vans On", and a promotional single "The Boom".

== Background ==
In 2011, T. Mills signed a deal to Columbia Records. After signing a deal, he began the 7-month recording on his second album. He done recorded 140 songs, narrowing it down to 10, and has decided it to release it as the 10-track free project to the fans. On July 22, 2011, Mills released the 10-track free project, titled Leaving Home serving as a mixtape, no guest appearances. It features production from Noel Zancanella, Omen, AudioBlack, The Futuristics, Colin Munroe and Phonix, among others. On December 6, 2011, Mills announced that he would be releasing the five-track EP, with its same name as his mixtape through Columbia Records. The EP's lead single, called "Vans On" was released on December 12, 2011, along with the promotional single from the EP, called "The Boom". Mills' Leaving Home EP was made available for retailed stores on December 13, 2011. He performed at Los Angeles's The Roxy for the Leaving Home EP release show on December 15, 2011. The EP was released only for free in a short time on December 19, 2011, however, the EP was officially released on January 13, 2012. The production was handled by Sir Nolan, The Stereotypes, Colin Munroe and The Futuristics, among others.

== Track listing ==
No.	Title	Writer(s)	Producer(s)	Length
1.	"Vans On"	Travis Mills; Omen; AudioBlack; Carlos Coleman	Sir Nolan; Jerrod Bettis	2:58
2.	"Leaving Home"	Mills; Colin Munroe	Munroe	4:02
3.	"The Boom"	Mills; Jonathan Yip; Jeremy Reeves; Ray Romulus; Mike Hamilton; Malcom McDaniel	The Stereotypes	3:25
4.	"LA It Down"	Mills; Osjai; Darrin Diggy	FultonYard; BlackCity M.G/Jai-Dig	3:32
5.	"Can't Take Ur Eyes Off Me"	Mills; Alex Schwartz; Joe Khajadourian	The Futuristics	3:47
6.	"Hollywood"	Mills; Munroe	Munroe	3:43
