= Cook Classics =

American music producer, songwriter and engineer

- Born: William Lobban-Bean; September 30, 1983 (age 43)
- Genres: Pop; Hip hop; R&B; EDM
- Occupation: Record producer
- Years active: 2008–present

William Lobban-Bean (born September 30, 1983), also known as Cook Classics, is an American music producer, songwriter and engineer. He is currently based in Los Angeles.

== Discography ==
=== Singles ===
Year	Title	Peak chart positions										Certifications
Year	Title	US	US Dance	US Pop	US Rhythmic	US Hip-Hop	AUS	CAN	NZ	SWE	UK	Certifications
2018	"High Hopes" Panic! At The Disco	4	—	1	—	—	7	8	16	14	12	US (RIAA): 2× Platinum; Aus (ARIA): 2× Platinum; UK (BPI): Gold; Can: 2× Platinum
2018	"Sweet but Psycho" Ava Max	10	—	3	—	—	2	30	1	1	1	Aus (ARIA): Gold; UK (BPI): Gold; Can: Gold
2017	"There for You" Martin Garrix ft. Troye Sivan	94	12	—	—	—	23	48	26	34	48	
2017	"She Lovin It" Trey Songz	—	—	—	—	—	—	—	—	—	—	
2017	"I Think of You" Jeremih	—	—	—	27	—	—	—	—	—	—	
2016	"Adderall" Max Frost	—	—	—	—	—	—	—	—	—	—	
2016	"Do Something Crazy (Good Vibes Only)" Outasight	—	—	—	—	—	—	—	—	—	—	
2016	"Do It" Futuristic	—	—	—	—	—	—	—	—	—	—	
2015	"Who You Lovin" Conrad Sewell	—	—	—	—	—	17	—	—	—	—	Aus (ARIA): Gold
2015	"Really Really" Kevin Gates	46	—	—	21	14	—	91	—	—	—	US (RIAA): 2× Platinum
2015	"Music to My Soul" Cee Lo Green	—	—	—	—	—	—	—	—	—	—	
2015	"Nothing But Trouble" Lil Wayne ft. Charlie Puth	86	—	—	7	—	—	—	—	—	—	
2015	"Baby's in Love" Jamie Foxx ft. Kid Ink	—	—	—	—	—	—	—	—	—	—	
2015	"Voir La Nuit S'emballer" M. Pokora	—	—	—	—	—	—	—	—	—	—	France: 2× Platinum (album)
2015	"Somebody" Natalie La Rose ft. Jeremih	10	—	3	1	5	12	22	34	68	2	US (RIAA): 2× Platinum; Aus (ARIA): Platinum; UK (BPI): Gold
2014	"Higher" Classified ft. B.o.B.	—	—	—	—	—	—	31	—	—	—	Can: Gold
2014	"Ring Off" Beyoncé	—	—	—	—	5	—	—	—	—	81	
2014	"All I Wanna Do" T. Mills	—	—	—	—	—	—	—	—	—	—	
2014	"Mmm Yeah" Austin Mahone ft. Pitbull	49	—	19	—	—	32	36	—	—	34	US (RIAA): Gold; Aus (ARIA): Gold
2013	"Can't Believe It" Flo Rida ft. Pitbull	—	—	37	—	—	7	—	36	—	—	Aus (ARIA): Gold
2011	"Tonight is the Night" Outasight	38	—	14	—	—	18	53	—	—	—	US (RIAA): Platinum; Aus (ARIA): Platinum

=== Full discography ===
Year	Artist	Album	Track
2026	Aespa	Lemonade	"Roll"
2022	Feenixpawl	--	"Drowning"
2022	ONEW	DICE - The 2nd Mini Album	"DICE"
2022	Fefe Dobson	--	"FCKN IN LOVE"
2021	Kid Ink ft. Goldiie	--	"Karma"
2021	Dean Lewis	--	"Looks Like Me"
2021	Chelsea Perkins	A Girl From Cali	"Like This"
2021	Chelsea Perkins	A Girl From Cali	"Take A Bow"
2021	Chelsea Perkins	A Girl From Cali	"Right Now"
2021	Chelsea Perkins	A Girl From Cali	"Fanny Pack"
2021	Chelsea Perkins	A Girl From Cali	"Vroom"
2021	Chelsea Perkins	A Girl From Cali	"Confidence"
2021	Chelsea Perkins	A Girl From Cali	"YAS"
2021	Chelsea Perkins	A Girl From Cali	"Guess What"
2021	U-Know	NOIR -The 2nd Mini Album	"Thank U"
2020	Sophia Messa	--	"Ice Cream & Cigarettes"
2020	NDJ	--	"Catch A Body (123)"
2020	Spencer Sutherland	--	"Indigo"
2020	Quinn XCII	A Letter To My Younger Self	"A Letter To My Younger Self (feat. Logic)"
2019	Andy Grammer	Naive	"I Found You"
2019	Ingrid Michaelson	Stranger Songs	"Jealous"
2019	MGK ft. Madison Love	--	"Waste Love"
2019	MGK	--	"Roulette"
2019	Stray Kids	Clé : LEVANTER	"You Can Stay"
2018	Ava Max	--	"Sweet but Psycho"
2018	Panic! at the Disco	Pray for the Wicked	"High Hopes"
2018	Outasight	Future Vintage Soul	"Never Get Enough"
2018	Outasight	Future Vintage Soul	"The Bounce"
2018	Outasight	Future Vintage Soul	"We Love It"
2018	Outasight	Future Vintage Soul	"Extra Special"
2018	Outasight	Future Vintage Soul	"Lost"
2018	Outasight	Future Vintage Soul	"Moonlight"
2018	Outasight	Future Vintage Soul	"Higher"
2018	Outasight	Future Vintage Soul	"Do It Again"
2018	Outasight	Future Vintage Soul	"Times Infinity"
2017	Jacob Sartorius	--	"Cozy"
2017	Jeremih ft Chris Brown and Big Sean	--	"I Think of You"
2017	DJ Vice ft Sage the Gemini and TK and Cash	--	"Firetruck"
2017	Trey Songz	Tremaine	"She Lovin It"
2017	Jacob Banks	The Boy Who Cried Freedom	"Part Time Love"
2017	Martin Garrix ft. Troye Sivan	--	"There for You"
2017	Sam Martin	--	"Bring Me Home"
2017	Outasight	Richie	"About Last Night"
2017	Outasight	Richie	"Bop"
2017	Outasight	Richie	"The Mission"
2017	Hey Violet	From the Outside	"My Consequence"
2017	Hoodie Allen	The Hype	"Believe" "Know It All"
2016	Chris Brown	Royalty International	"Lonely Dancer"
2016	Outasight	Mike and Dave Need Wedding Dates soundtrack	"Do Something Crazy"
2016	Futuristic	As Seen on the Internet	"Do It," "Flex," "Can't Go Back"
2016	Max Frost	--	"Adderall"
2015	Natalie La Rose ft. Jeremih	--	"Somebody"
2015	Matt Pokora	R.E.D.	"Voir La Nuit S'emballer"
2015	Flo Rida	My House	"Wobble"
2015	Ester Dean	Miss Ester Dean	"Fuck It"
2015	Outasight	Big Trouble	The Wild Life, Big Trouble, Here Comes the Man, Supernatural, Modern Love, Boom
2015	Jamie Foxx	Hollywood	"Baby's In Love"
2015	Jason Derulo	Everything is 4	"Pull Up"
2015	Lil Wayne ft. Charlie Puth	808 Soundtrack	Nothing But Trouble
2015	Cee Lo Green	Heart Blanche	"Sign of the Times," "Music to My Soul"
2015	B.o.B	Psycadelik Thoughtz	"Psycadelik Thoughtz"
2015	Kevin Gates	Islah	"Really Really"
2015	Conrad Sewell	All I Know	"Who You Lovin"
2015	Trey Songz	To Whom it May Concern	Waffles and Eggs
2014	Austin Mahone ft. Pitbull	The Secret	"Mmm Yeah"
2014	T. Mills	All I Wanna Do EP	"All I Wanna Do," "Somebody to Miss You"
2014	Beyoncé	Beyoncé: Platinum Edition	"Ring Off"
2014	Classified ft. B.o.B.	Classified	"Higher"
2013	Flo Rida	--	"Can't Believe It"
2013	Cook Classics	Cook Classics vs. Now Again	--
2012	XV	Awesome EP!	"The Most" & "Chains, Whips & Bars"
2012	Outasight	Nights Like These	"Let's Go," "Ready, Set, Go," "Under Lock and Key," "Nights Like These"
2011	Outasight	Nights Like These	"Tonight is the Night"
2011	Pac Div ft. Tiron	The Div	"She"
2011	XV ft. Machine Gun Kelly	--	"Finally Home"
2010	Cook Classics	Recharged	--
2008	Diamond D	The Huge Hefner Chronicles	I Getz It In
