= All I Wanna Do (EP) =

EP by T. Mills
- Released: February 25, 2014
- Recorded: 2012–14
- Genre: Pop rap
- Length: 13:35
- Label: Columbia
- Producers: Cook Classics; Boi-1da; Soulshock; Sean Hurley; Ludwig Göransson; Malay

T. Mills chronology
Leaving Home EP (2011)	All I Wanna Do (2014)

Singles from All I Wanna Do
- 1. "All I Wanna Do" Released: February 24, 2014

All I Wanna Do is the second extended play (EP) by American recording artist T. Mills. It was released for the retail sales on February 25, 2014, by Columbia Records. The production on this project was handled by Boi-1da, Malay and Cook Classics, among others. All I Wanna Do EP was supported by the lead single "All I Wanna Do", and a promotional single "Riverside Girl". All I Wanna Do has peaked at number 16 on the Billboard Top Rap Albums.

== Background ==
In April 2013, Mills toured the United States with an American rapper Sammy Adams. After Mills was touring the United States with We the Kings, and fellow supporting acts The Ready Set and Breathe Carolina on the SummerFest 2013. The music video for the EP's lead single "All I Wanna Do", was shot in July 2013. Mills released the promotional single "Riverside Girl" on October 10, 2013.

On February 18, 2014, T. Mills announced the All I Wanna Do EP. Starting on February 24, 2014, T. Mills begun touring on the All I Wanna Do tour. Then on February 24, 2014, Mills released the audio to "All I Wanna Do". The following day, T. Mills released the All I Wanna Do EP to iTunes. The EP featured production from Boi-1da, Malay and Cook Classics. On the EP's release date the lyric video for "All I Wanna Do" was released.

== Singles ==
The EP's titular song "All I Wanna Do" was released for digital download the day before the EP's release. "All I Wanna Do" will be serviced to rhythmic contemporary radio in the United States on July 29, 2014. Then on August 12, 2014, it will be serviced to contemporary hit radio in the US.

== Critical reception ==
Professional ratings
Review scores
Source	Rating
UnderTheGunReview	8/10

Upon its release, All I Wanna Do was met generally positive reviews from music critics. James Shotwell of UnderTheGunReview said, "The rise of T. Mills has been unlike any other in recent memory, and All I Wanna Do is further proof he is destined for big things in the not too distant future. His first releases seem like child’s play compared to the quality and anthemic nature of this material, but it’s also largely a departure from the sound that helped build his brand. I’m not sure fans will embrace the change as fast as the execs at Sony probably would like, but with the right marketing campaign 2014 could quickly become a very exciting year for T. Mills and his ever-growing bandwagon of followers."

== Track listing ==
No.	Title	Writer(s)	Producer(s)	Length
1.	"All I Wanna Do"	Travis Mills; William Lobban-Bean; Andrew Frampton; Hubie Wang; Breyan Stanley	Cook Classics	3:20
2.	"Go For It All"	Mills; Carsten Schack; Sean Hurley	Soulshock; Hurley	4:00
3.	"Somebody to Miss You"	Mills; Matthew Samuels; Lobban-Bean; Ludwig Göransson; Matt Morris; James Fauntleroy	Boi-1da; Cook Classics; Göransson	3:04
4.	"Riverside Girl"	Mills; Faunterloy; James Ho	Malay	3:11

== Charts ==
Chart (2014)	Peak position
US Heatseekers Albums (Billboard)	4
US Top Rap Albums (Billboard)	16
