= From the Outside (Hey Violet album) =

Studio album by Hey Violet
- Released: June 16, 2017
- Recorded: 2016–2017
- Studios: Capitol (Los Angeles) (Note: Track 11); Chumba Meadows (Tarzana) (Note: Additional recording (4)); Enemy Dojo (Calabasas) (Note: All tracks); Sarm Music Village (London); Tom Fazio (Palm Springs) (Note: Tracks 6, 7, 10, 11)
- Genres: Pop; alternative pop; dance-pop; electropop; pop-punk
- Length: 41:27
- Labels: Hi or Hey; Capitol
- Producers: Afterhrs; Julian Bunetta (also exec.); Cook Classics; Cory Enemy; DallasK; Jason Evigan; Teddy Geiger; David Pramik; Picard Brothers

Hey Violet chronology
Brand New Moves (2016)	From the Outside (2017)	Problems (2021)

Singles from From the Outside
- 1. "Guys My Age" Released: September 20, 2016; 2. "Break My Heart" Released: March 10, 2017; 3. "Hoodie" Released: July 11, 2017

From the Outside is the second studio album by the American pop rock band Hey Violet, released on June 16, 2017, by Hi or Hey and Capitol Records. It was the band's first album since changing their name from Cherri Bomb to Hey Violet in 2015, and last with rhythm guitarist and keyboardist Miranda Miller. Hey Violet worked on the album between 2016 and 2017, collaborating primarily with producer Julian Bunetta; recording sessions were held mainly at Sarm Music Village in London and Enemy Dojo in Calabasas, California. Musically, From the Outside continues Hey Violet's departure from the sound of their early releases and shifts between various styles including pop, alternative pop, dance-pop, electropop, and pop-punk. Its lyrics are centered around seeing love, relationships and experiences from different perspectives, and explore themes of coming of age, personal authenticity and self-determination.

From the Outside was supported by three singles, which all made appearances on the Billboard Pop Airplay chart; "Guys My Age", "Break My Heart" and "Hoodie". "Guys My Age" also reached number 68 on the Billboard Hot 100, marking Hey Violet's first and only song entry on the chart. The band embarked on headlining tours of North America and Europe in the run-up to the album's release; it debuted and peaked at number 110 on the US Billboard 200 and number 2 on the Billboard Top Heatseekers Albums chart. Music critics praised its songwriting, themes, production and Rena's performance, though some felt it lacked substance and were disappointed by Hey Violet's departure from their rock sound.

== Background ==
Hey Violet were originally formed in 2008 as Cherri Bomb by guitarist/vocalist Julia Pierce, bassist Rena Lovelis, keyboardist Miranda Miller and drummer Nia Lovelis. Under their former name, the band played a hard rock style, toured extensively, and released their debut album This is the End of Control (2012) through Hollywood Records. After Pierce left the band due to creative differences in January 2013, guitarist Casey Moreta was recruited and Rena became their lead vocalist. Moreta, Miller, Nia and Rena spent a year experimenting with Cherri Bomb's sound before deciding to pursue a pop music direction; they subsequently changed their name to Hey Violet in February 2015. Shortly thereafter, the band was signed to Hi or Hey Records, an imprint label of Capitol Records founded by 5 Seconds of Summer, who took the band as their supporting act on their worldwide tours over the next two years. In July 2015, Hey Violet released their debut extended play, I Can Feel It, which showcased a pop-punk sound. A month after the release of their second EP Brand New Moves (2016), which saw them moving in a synth-pop direction, bassist Iain Shipp joined the band, allowing Rena to focus on vocals.

== Recording and production ==
Hey Violet wrote and recorded From the Outside over the course of a year and a half. The band worked primarily with producer Julian Bunetta, whom they began collaborating with at the end of 2015 after meeting backstage at one of their shows. Bunetta said he was impressed by the band's energy and wanted to change their tempos to "give people something to dance to rather than jump to". The first songs they wrote together were "Brand New Moves" and "Fuqboi", which were both recorded in 2016 for Brand New Moves and later featured on From the Outside. Hey Violet worked on songs collaboratively, with Bunetta either creating an instrumental or the band discussing what music they listened to and a sound they wanted; Rena said each song's impetus was different. During the album's writing period, the members of Hey Violet drew influence from Cyndi Lauper, The Cure, Melanie Martinez, No Doubt, The 1975, Twenty One Pilots, St. Lucia, St. Vincent, and The Weeknd. Lyrical inspiration was drawn from conversations about their personal lives; Rena gave Bunetta her personal journal to read at one point.

Most of the album's songs—including "Guys My Age", "O.D.D.", "Where Have You Been (All My Night)", and "Like Lovers Do"—were written in the space of a week and a half as part of a "crazy writing session" in Palm Springs, Florida, where Hey Violet stayed with ten other songwriters in a rental house. All of the band's members initially attended the sessions together; due to them struggling with the number of people in the room, they later decided that two of them would go at a time and get feedback from the rest of the band thereafter. Rena said that writing was handled by her, Nia, Moreta and Miller, though she and Nia handled much of the writing together. The songs were then sent off to another producer to give them a further perspective, and revised until having the finished version.

Recording sessions for From the Outside were held mainly at Sarm Music Village in London and Enemy Dojo in Calabasas, California; additional sessions were held at Capitol Studios and Chumba Meadows in Los Angeles and Tom Fazio in Palm Springs. Aside of Bunetta, who is credited as its executive producer, the album's production was handled by Cook Classics, DallasK, Jason Evigan, Teddy Geiger, and others. In a November 2016 interview with Billboard, Rena said that Hey Violet had amassed three albums worth of songs and were in the process of deciding which ones to "tweak" and put on the album. By April 2017, they were narrowing down its track listing from 20 to 25 songs. Hey Violet selected songs for the album based on how they thought their fans would react to them live.

== Composition ==
=== Overview ===
I saw this Instagram post that summed up what we meant by the title [of From the Outside]: 'Sometimes you have to step outside of your comfort zone to get what you want. There's beauty in uncomfortable places—don't be afraid.' I saw that and thought, 'That's what you have to do to get these different perspectives in your life and the relationships you're going through, whether it's good or bad, whether it's about fuckboys or not...'

— Rena Lovelis

From the Outside continues Hey Violet's departure from the sound of their early releases and shifts between various styles including pop, alternative pop, dance-pop, electropop, and pop-punk. Chris DeVille of Stereogum described it as "post-EDM pop rock" and said the band often "barely even qualifies as rock at all" on account of their "heavy electronic undercurrent"; he also highlighted its emphasis on synthesizers over guitars (with the exceptions of "Fuqboi" and "This is Me Breaking Up With You"), programmed beats and Rena's melodic vocals. Rena said that Hey Violet wanted to push themselves "outside of [their] box", and felt that as "pop is such a general term—[the album] could incorporate thousands of different genres".

The album's lyrics are centered around seeing love, relationships and experiences from different perspectives, and explore themes of coming of age, personal authenticity and self-determination. Jon Caramanica of The New York Times viewed "sexual agency" as one of the album's running themes, highlighting the songs "Brand New Moves", "Unholy", and "Like Lovers Do", and felt that Rena had an unusual "degree of frankness" compared with other contemporary female pop singers. Steve Horowitz of PopMatters believed its central message was to prioritize personal authenticity above others expectations and felt Hey Violet expressed a desire to "experience everything for the experience itself". Mikael Wood of the Los Angeles Times described it as dealing with "the stifling expectations placed on young women". Nia derived the album's title from a lyric in the song "Where Have You Been (All My Night)", though its meaning differs from that of the song in general.

=== Songs ===
The opening track of From the Outside, "Break My Heart", is a "breakup anthem" that draws from late 2010s tropical pop and features an EDM beat drop. Rena said the song is about the "darker side of love" and wanting to break up with a significant other after going through various stages in a relationship in order to see their feelings of "desperation and longing". Though conceding it was "a little masochistic", Rena said the song's happy resolution—which sees the couple getting back together—was atypical of Hey Violet's output. "Brand New Moves" is a dance-rock song about attempting to reignite a former relationship with new knowledge gained from experiences. "Guys My Age" was written about Hey Violet's experiences with people who they felt lacked the mental maturity for relationships. Rena said that despite its title, the song was not meant to address people of a specific age or gender. Musically, the song is driven by a "thumping beat" and incorporates trap elements and cooed vocals; Moreta said that its lack of guitar allowed him to experiment with his parts and effects during live performances. "Hoodie" is about holding onto a physical memento of an ex-lover one has not gotten over. Moreta likened "My Consequence" to a 1980s-style ballad; AllMusic's Heather Phares compared the song to Daya. "O.D.D." features a stripped-down acoustic arrangement placed over hip-hop beats and EDM-inspired pitch shifts; DeVille also described it as drawing from dubstep and trip-hop. Lyrically, the song is about self-authenticity, and recognizing that it is okay to be weird and feel that you do not belong.

According to Horowitz, "All We Ever Wanted" sees Hey Violet "take shouted pride in being [...] as they really are". Rena called "Fuqboi" an attempt by Hey Violet to "capture the essence of the 'fuckboy' "; the band wrote the song after Bunetta asked about their experiences with them. Mackenzie Hall of Alternative Press called it both "anthemic and tongue-in-cheek". "Unholy" is an electropop song about imagining being with someone else whilst in a relationship; Moreta considered it to be From the Outside's darkest song. In the song's intro, Bunetta plays a wrong note on a keyboard, which was kept as the members of Hey Violet liked it. They considered "Where Have You Been (All My Night)" to be nostalgic; Miller felt the song had a vintage feel comparable to the Black Mirror episode "San Junipero". DeVille and Phares described it as synth-pop, with the former comparing it to Chvrches. "Like Lovers Do" depicts someone fantasizing about the potentials of being in a relationship with a man they have seen at a bar. The song alternates between acoustic verses and pop rock choruses, and features a breakdown that DeVille likened to Evanescence covering "Kashmir" by Led Zeppelin. Moreta felt it was reminiscent of the My Chemical Romance song "Mama". The final track on From the Outside, "This Is Me Breaking Up with You", recalls Hey Violet's early rock sound and was described as an "accidental ode" to it by Miller. Nia said the song was written early on but forgotten until the band were working on its track listing, at which point they thought it would be good to perform live.

== Release and promotion ==
On September 20, 2016, "Guys My Age" was released as the lead single from From the Outside. Its music video was released on November 2, 2016. On November 16, the band performed the song on The Late Late Show with James Corden. On March 10, "Break My Heart" was released as the album's second single, with its music video, directed by Darren Craig and Jesse Heath, being released on April 3. On April 17, 2017, Hey Violet announced From the Outside; on June 1, the band premiered "O.D.D." through Rookie. The album was released on June 16, 2017. Three days later, Hey Violet announced that "Hoodie" would be released as the album's third single. It was added as a single to Radio Disney on July 11, 2017.

Supported by Jessarae, Hey Violet embarked on their debut headlining North America tour in March 2017, and toured Europe between April 28 and May 10. On June 7, the band played a one-off show in London. In August 2017, they played their first shows in Japan at the Summer Sonic Festival in Tokyo and Osaka. Following these performances, Miller announced her departure from Hey Violet on August 31, citing her exhaustion from touring; the split was amicable. The band continued touring as a quartet, and spent the rest of 2017 performing various radio shows.

== Critical reception ==
Professional ratings
Review scores
Source	Rating
AllMusic	3/5 stars
Kerrang!	3/5 stars
Melodic	2.5/5 stars
PopMatters	8/10
Rock Sound	6/10
Upset	4/5 stars

Horowitz of PopMatters hailed From the Outside as a "modern masterpiece" for its themes of authenticity and praised its optimism. A writer for Idobi Radio called it a "lesson in guitar pop done right" and compared it favorably to Hey Monday. Caramanica of The New York Times called From the Outside "one of [2017's] best and most provocative pop albums", highlighting Bunetta's production and Rena's performance; DeVille of Stereogum likewise praised her "vocal and lyrical presence" on the album and its cohesiveness given its stylistic diversity. Phares of AllMusic also praised Hey Violet's ability to "handle [...] many stylistic shifts without giving listeners too much sonic whiplash", though she felt the band "sometimes seem to have more personality than their material". Rob Sayce of Rock Sound found the album "deeply muddled" and had "little substance behind the style", whilst Kaj Roth of Melodic felt Hey Violet had lost some of their identity in pursuing a pop direction. Kerrang!'s James Hickie called the album a "worthy debut" but considered "This Is Me Breaking Up with You" a reminder of "what [...] might have been" had Hey Violet made an album in the style of Cherri Bomb.

"Guys My Age" was named one of the best songs of 2016 by V Magazine and Caramanica, who also ranked From the Outside at number four on his list of the best albums of 2017. James Wilson-Taylor of Capital FM said it was "arguably the best debut album of 2017". Wood of the Los Angeles Times called the album "2017's most convincing rebel yell" and felt it had not got "the traction [...] it deserved" for unclear reasons, though believed it had been affected by confusion surrounding Hey Violet's name change and Miller's departure. In 2019, Chris Payne of Billboard said it "holds up as one of pop's under-the-radar gems from recent years".

== Commercial performance ==
From the Outside debuted and peaked at number 110 on the US Billboard 200 at number 2 on the Billboard Top Heatseeker Albums chart. "Guys My Age", "Break My Heart" and "Hoodie" all charted on the Billboard Pop Airplay chart, at numbers 20, 37, and 33, respectively. "Guys My Age" became Hey Violet's first and only charting song on the Billboard Hot 100, reaching a peak position of number 68, and additionally peaked at number 78 on the Australian ARIA Top 100 Singles chart.

== Track listing ==
From the Outside – Standard edition track listing
No.	Title	Writer(s)	Producer(s)	Length
1.	"Break My Heart"	Rena Lovelis; Nia Lovelis; Miranda Miller; Casey Moreta; Kristian Lundin; Julian Bunetta; Cory Enemy	Bunetta; Cory Enemy; Picard Brothers	3:29
2.	"Brand New Moves"	Bunetta; N. Lovelis; R. Lovelis; Miller; Moreta	Bunetta; Jussifer (add.)	3:47
3.	"Guys My Age"	R. Lovelis; N. Lovelis; Miller; Moreta; Bunetta; John Ryan; Henry Walter; Ilsey Juber; Jacob Kasher Hindlin	Bunetta	3:33
4.	"Hoodie"	Bunetta; Jason Evigan; Ross Golan; Hindlin; Ammar Malik; Daniel Omelio	Bunetta; Evigan	3:39
5.	"My Consequence"	R. Lovelis; N. Lovelis; Miller; Moreta; Bunetta; Carah Faye Charnow; Cook Classics; Tash Phillips	Bunetta; Cook Classics	4:22
6.	"O.D.D."	Bunetta; N. Lovelis; R. Lovelis; Miller; Moreta; Sabrina Louise Bernstein; Ian Franzino; Teddy Geiger; Asia Whiteacre	Afterhrs; Bunetta; Geiger	3:42
7.	"All We Ever Wanted"	Bunetta; N. Lovelis; R. Lovelis; Miller; Moreta; Hindlin; Dallas Koehlke; Ruth-Anne Cunningham; Teddy Geiger	Bunetta; DallasK	2:44
8.	"Fuqboi"	Bunetta; N. Lovelis; R. Lovelis; Miller; Moreta	Bunetta	3:07
9.	"Unholy"	Bunetta; N. Lovelis; R. Lovelis; Miller; Moreta; Fiona Bevan; David Pramik	Bunetta; Pramik	3:57
10.	"Where Have You Been (All My Night)"	Bunetta; MoZella; Juber	Bunetta	3:48
11.	"Like Lovers Do"	Haas; Franzino; Joe Kirkland; Whiteacre	Afterhrs; Bunetta	3:06
12.	"This Is Me Breaking Up with You"	Bunetta; N. Lovelis; R. Lovelis; Miller; Moreta	Bunetta	2:13
Total length:				41:27

Target exclusive bonus tracks
No.	Title	Writer(s)	Producer(s)	Length
13.	"Cannibals"	R. Lovelis; N. Lovelis; Miller; Moreta; Bunetta; Lundin	Bunetta	3:31
14.	"These Moments"	R. Lovelis; N. Lovelis; Miller; Moreta; Bunetta	Bunetta	4:23
15.	"When Will I Learn" (demo)	R. Lovelis; N. Lovelis; Miller; Moreta; Juber; Bunetta	Bunetta	2:04
Total length:				51:25

== Personnel ==
Adapted from liner notes and iTunes.

Musicians

- Hey Violet – instruments, background vocals
- Julian Bunetta – instruments (all), background vocals (1–10, 12)
- Cory Emery – instruments, background vocals (1)
- Clement and Maxime Picard (a.k.a. Picard Brothers) – programming, background vocals, instruments (1)
- Jussifer – instruments (2)
- Cirkut – instruments (3)
- Jason Evigan – instruments, background vocals (4)
- Cook Classics – instruments (5)
- Carah Faye – background vocals (5)
- Ian Franzio – instruments, background vocals (6, 11), string arrangements (11)
- Andrew Haas – instruments, background vocals (6, 11), guitars, string arrangements (11)
- Teddy Geiger – instruments (6)
- DallasK – instruments (7)
- David Pramik – instruments (9)
- Asia Whitaker – instruments, background vocals (11)
- Joseph Kirkland – instruments, guitars, background vocals (11)
- Alicia Bauer – strings (11)
- Cathleen Sloan – strings (11)

Technical

- Julian Bunetta – recording (1–10, 12), mixing (11)
- Afterhrs – recording (6, 11)
- DallasK – recording (7)
- Eric Greedy – recording (11)
- Jason Evigan – additional recording (4)
- Connor Mason – assistant engineer (5–12)
- Serban Ghenea – mixing (1, 2, 3, 4)
- John Hanes – mixing engineer (1, 2, 3, 4)
- Ash Howes – mixing (5, 6, 8, 10, 12)
- Christopher Elliott – mixing (7)
- Delbert Bowes – mixing (9)
- Joe Zook – mixing (11)
- Andrew Lottinger – mixing assistant (11)
- Tom Coyne – mastering (1–3)
- Nathan Dantzler – mastering (4–12)

== Charts ==
Chart (2017)	Peak position
Australian Albums (ARIA)	67
Belgian Albums (Ultratop Flanders)	153
UK Album Downloads (Official Charts)	93
US Billboard 200	110
US Heatseekers Albums (Billboard)	2

== Bibliography ==
- Sherman, Maria (March 2017). "Hey Violet: Their Brand New Moves". Alternative Press. Vol. 31, no. 344. pp. 58–70. ISSN 1065-1667.
