= Big Trouble (Outasight album) =

Studio album by Outasight
- Released: October 23, 2015
- Recorded: 2014–15 in West Hollywood, Los Angeles, California
- Length: 38:19
- Label: RPM MSC
- Producer: Richard "Outasight" Andrews; Cook Classics

Outasight chronology
Nights Like These (2012)	Big Trouble (2015)

Singles from Big Trouble
- 1. "The Wild Life" Released: April 20, 2015; 2. "Big Trouble" Released: July 29, 2015; 3. "Back to Life" Released: September 23, 2015; 4. "The Boogie" Released: October 8, 2015

Big Trouble is the second studio album by American recording artist and musician Outasight, released on October 23, 2015. The album was preceded by the lead single "The Wild Life", released on April 20, 2015. The album is a follow-up to Outasight's debut studio album, Nights Like These (2012). It was produced by Richard Andrew and Will Lobban-Bean, better known as Cook Classics. The album was heavily inspired by funk, jazz, soul, and pop.

== Background ==
Following the success of Richard Andrew's debut studio album, Nights Like These, and extensive touring, he began writing and recording for his second studio album, which later would become Big Trouble. Throughout 2014, he became an independent recording artist departing from Warner Bros. Records and signed to RPM MSC. He moved from his hometown of Yonkers, New York, to Los Angeles, California, to gain inspiration and write, record, and produce a new album. He wrote and recorded with Will Lobban-Bean, who is known professionally as Cook Classics, who had produced Andrew's debut album as well. He released the first single from Big Trouble, "The Wild Life", on April 20, 2015 to contemporary radio and digital retailers. Speaking about the single he said:

The Wild Life was one of the first songs I recorded after moving to Los Angeles last fall. Right away, the move changed the entire direction of my music. I went from making a dark album in the hellish winter of New York to the sunny vibes of L.A. Every party or BBQ I throw, I've been playing all James Brown and P-Funk, so I feel like this direction is very natural.

The album's title comes from the novel Fear and Loathing in Las Vegas: A Savage Journey to the Heart of the American Dream from author Hunter S. Thompson.

== Promotion ==
Big Trouble was first announced in July 2015. "The Wild Life" was released on April 20, 2015, and later became the promotional song featured on Bud Light Lime's 2015 summer commercial in the U.S. A music video for the single was released on July 29, 2015. "Big Trouble" was released as the second single from the album on July 29, 2015; it is also used as the intro for the pregame show on CBS/NFL Thursday Night Football. "Back to Life" was released as the third single on September 23, 2015. The fourth single, "The Boogie", was released on October 8.

== Track listing ==
No.	Title	Length
1.	"Satellites"	4:36
2.	"The Wild Life"	3:20
3.	"The Boogie"	3:27
4.	"Big Trouble"	3:20
5.	"A Modern Love"	3:02
6.	"Supernatural"	3:31
7.	"Invitation"	3:52
8.	"Here Comes the Man"	3:11
9.	"Back to Life"	3:19
10.	"Boom"	3:33
11.	"Saints & Sinners"	4:26
Total length:		39:37

== Personnel ==
- Richard Andrew - vocals, songwriting
- Cook Classics - production
- Erik Madrid - mixing, production
- 6th Sense - production, writing
- Jeff Gitelman - production, writing, composition
