= Break My Heart (Hey Violet song) =

Single by Hey Violet

from the album From the Outside
- Released: March 10, 2017
- Genre: Electro; pop; EDM
- Length: 3:29
- Label: 5Mode; Capitol
- Songwriter(s): Rena Lovelis; Nia Lovelis; Miranda Miller; Casey Moreta; Kristian Lundin; Julian Bunetta; Cory Enemy; Iain Shipp
- Producer(s): Julian Bunetta; Cory Enemy; Picard Brothers

Hey Violet singles chronology
"Guys My Age" (2016)	"Break My Heart" (2017)	"Hoodie" (2017)

"Break My Heart" is a song by American rock band Hey Violet from their debut studio album, From the Outside (2017). The song was written by the band's members, along with the song's producers Julian Bunetta, Cory Enemy, and the Picard Brothers. It was released on March 10, 2017, as the album's second single.

== Composition ==
"Break My Heart" is a part of the sonic departure from the pop punk style Hey Violet previously created to a more synth-based sound. Lead singer Rena Lovelis described the single as a song that is "capable of experimenting with new sounds and toying with synths."

== Critical reception ==
Alternative Press called the song a "jam", while Popdust dubbed it as "a full-blown addiction". Mike Wass from Idolator described the song as a "monstrous electro-anthem". In a review of From the Outside, Heather Phares noted that the song "takes its cues from late-2010s trends like tropical pop and EDM, but the hooks are all Hey Violet".

== Music video ==
The music video for "Break My Heart", directed by Darren Craig and Jesse Heath, premiered on April 3, 2017.

== Track listings ==
- Digital download
1. "Break My Heart" – 3:29
- Digital download – Stripped
1. "Break My Heart" (Stripped) – 3:49
- Digital download – Vertue Remix
1. "Break My Heart" (Vertue Remix) – 4:07
- Digital download – Big Fish Remix
1. "Break My Heart" (Big Fish Remix) – 3:35

== Charts ==
Chart (2017)	Peak position
US Pop Airplay (Billboard)	37

== Release history ==
Region	Date	Format	Label	Ref.
Various	March 10, 2017	Digital download	5Mode; Capitol	
United States	April 4, 2017	Contemporary hit radio	Caroline; Modest!	
Various	April 14, 2017	Digital download – Stripped	5Mode; Capitol	
Various	May 19, 2017	Digital download – Vertue Remix	5Mode; Capitol	
Various	May 26, 2017	Digital download – Big Fish Remix	5Mode; Capitol	
