= Guys My Age =

Single by Hey Violet

from the album From the Outside
- Released: September 20, 2016
- Genre: Synth-pop
- Length: 3:32
- Label: Hi or Hey; 5Mode; Capitol
- Songwriters: Rena Lovelis; Nia Lovelis; Miranda Miller; Casey Moreta; Julian Bunetta; John Ryan; Henry Walter; Ilsey Juber; Jacob Kasher
- Producers: Julian Bunetta; John Ryan; Cirkut; Ilsey Juber; Jacob Kasher

Hey Violet singles chronology
"Brand New Moves" (2016)	"Guys My Age" (2016)	"Break My Heart" (2017)

"Guys My Age" is a song by the American rock band Hey Violet. It was released as a digital download on September 20, 2016. The synth-pop song is about the singer's past upsets with "guys her age" and finding success with a "grown up".

== Critical reception ==
Mike Wass of Idolator wrote that the song is "as ruthless as it is catchy" and praised the pop-oriented direction the group took.

== Chart performance ==
"Guys My Age" debuted at number 84 on the Billboard Hot 100 chart dated February 11, 2017, the group's first entry on the chart. It reached a peak position of 68 on the chart dated March 4, 2017.

== Music video ==
The official music video for "Guys My Age" was released on November 2, 2016. It was filmed at the Madonna Inn in San Luis Obispo, California, and at Cadillac Jack's and Pink Motel in Sun Valley, Los Angeles. Directed by Sophia Ray, it shows a surreal dream sequence taking place inside Rena Lovelis' head, with several neon-lit settings.

== Charts ==
Chart (2016–17)	Peak position
Australia (ARIA)	78
Canada CHR/Top 40 (Billboard)	49
US Billboard Hot 100	68
US Pop Airplay (Billboard)	20
