= Travis Mills =

American rapper, singer, and actor

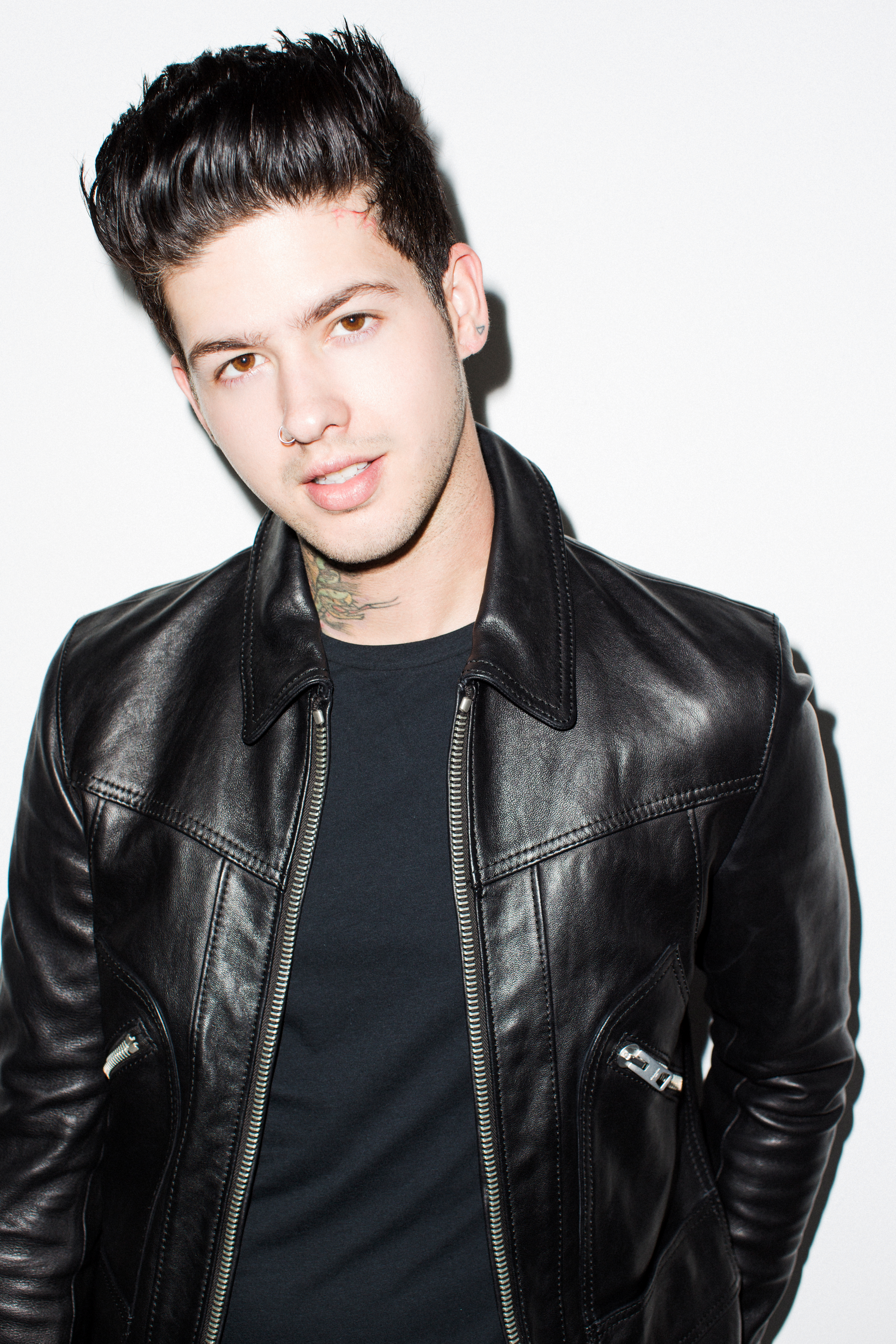
- Mills in 2016

Background information
- Also known as: T. Mills; T. Million
- Born: Travis Tatum Mills; April 12, 1989 (age 37)
- Origin: Riverside, California, U.S.
- Genres: Pop rap; synthpop; pop punk; punk rock
- Occupations: Rapper; singer; songwriter; actor; comedian
- Years active: 2009–present
- Labels: First Access; Big Noise; Republic; Lava; Uprising; Columbia; Radical by The Orchard
- Member of: girlfriends
- Website: iamtravismills.com

Travis Tatum Mills (born April 12, 1989), previously known by his stage name T. Mills, is an American rapper, singer, and actor from Riverside, California. Following his name change from T. Mills to Travis Mills, he began hosting an eponymous show on Apple Music 1.

== Early life ==
Travis Tatum Mills was born on April 12, 1989, in Riverside, California. At the age of 5, Mills' uncle gave him his first guitar and at the age of 15 Mills stopped playing sports to start a punk rock band. After graduating high school, Mills began writing his own songs and produced them on a computer software. He started uploading his music on MySpace and intentionally posted "provocative" photos on the platform to stir interest.

== Career ==
=== 2008–2010: Career beginnings and Ready, Fire, Aim! ===
At the age of 17, Mills began writing songs in his bedroom, using music software such as Apple's Garage Band. At the age of 18, Mills began posting some of his music on his Myspace page. In 2008, Mills signed a deal to the indie record label Uprising Records.

=== 2011–2012: Signing to Columbia Records, Leaving Home and MtvU's Woodie Awards ===
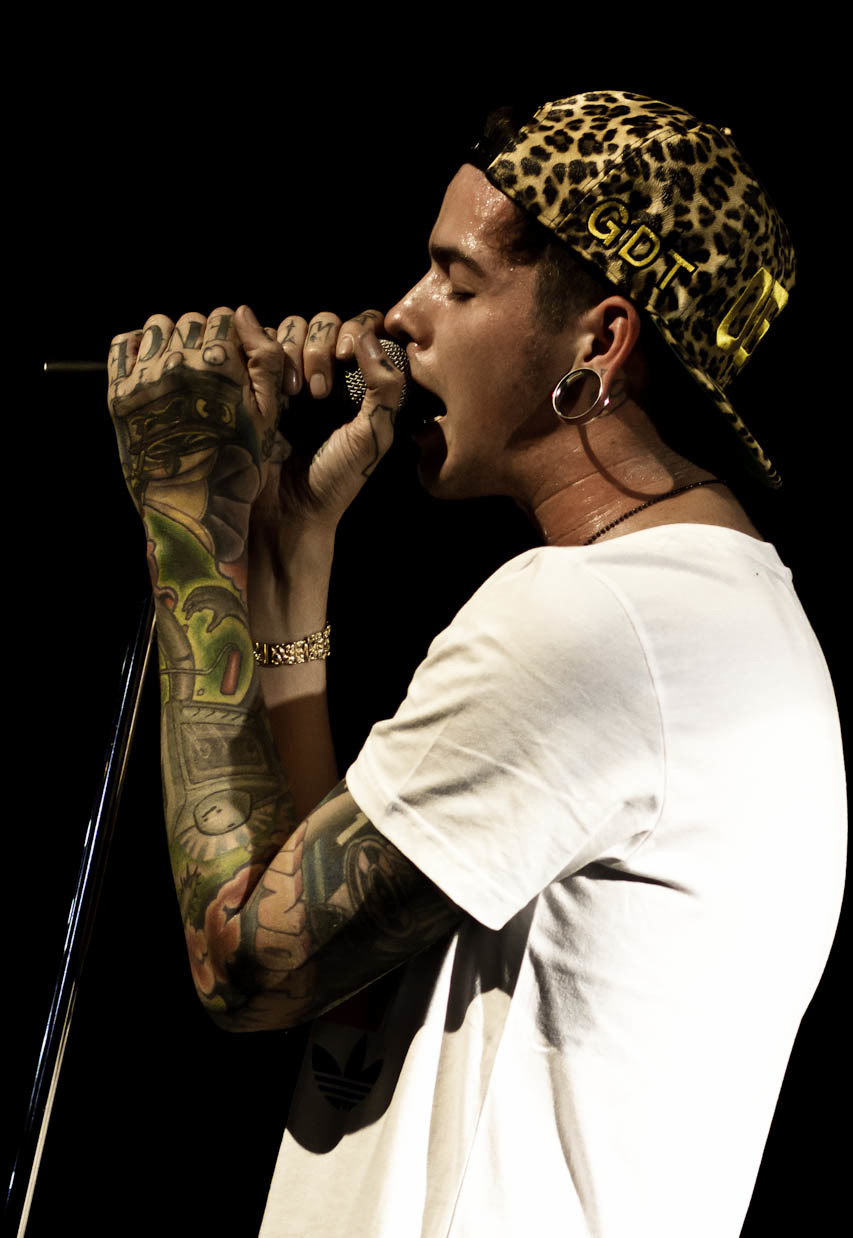
T. Mills performing in March 2012

In 2011, Mills signed a deal to Columbia Records, following him signing a deal, he began recording his second and first major-label album. On July 22, 2011, Mills released a mixtape, titled Leaving Home. Leaving Home is a 10-track project, with no guest appearances, while the production was provided from Noel Zancalla, Omen, AudioBlack, The Futuristics, Colin Munroe and Phonix, among others. On December 6, 2011, Mills announced that he would be repackaged as a 5-track EP, under its same name as his mixtape through Columbia Records. The EP's lead single, called "Vans On" was released on December 12, 2011, along with the promotional single, called "The Boom". The EP was made available for retail stores on December 13, 2011. On December 15, 2011, to promote the release of the EP, he performed at The Roxy Show in Los Angeles, California. The EP was released for free on December 19, 2011, The EP was officially released on January 13, 2012, featuring some added new tracks, while the additional production was provided from Sir Nolan and The Stereotypes, among others.

In March 2012, Mills was nominated for the Best New Artist at the MtvU's Woodie Awards. On July 23, 2012, Mills released his second mixtape, called Thrillionaire. It contains 10 tracks, featuring three guest appearances from American rapper Smoke DZA, the hip hop duo Audio Push, and an American musician James Fauntleroy II; as well as the production from Sledgren, The Monsters & Strangerz and Kane Beatz, among others. To promote the mixtape release, Mills filmed some music videos for songs such as "Lightweight", "Diemonds" and "Other Bitch Callin'" featuring James Fauntleroy II. Mills later announced that he is planning on releasing the sequel for his second mixtape, called Thrillionaire 2.

=== 2013–2015: SummerFest and All I Wanna Do ===
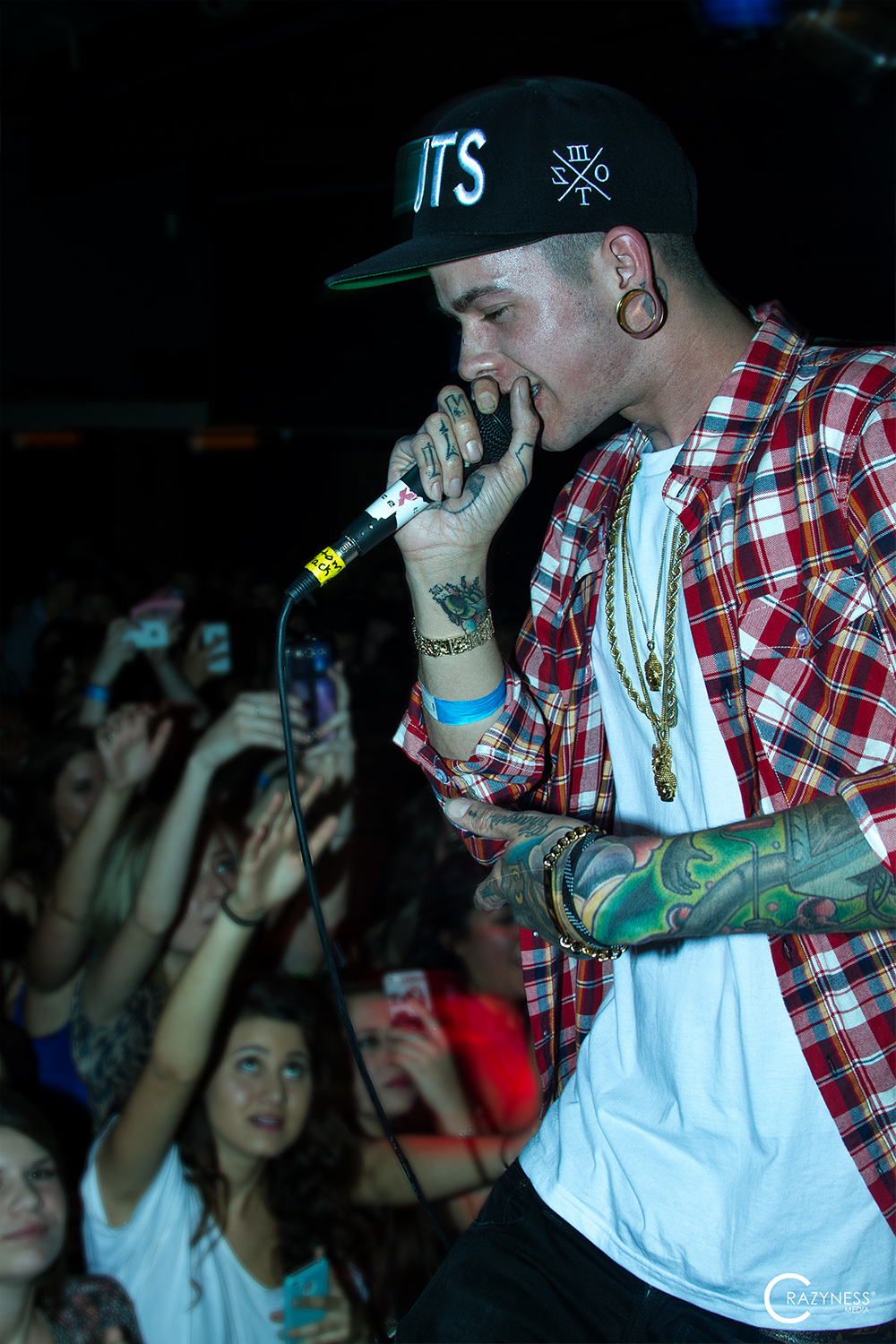
Mills performing in Hollywood in 2013

In 2013, Mills announced that the release date for his second major-label album has been slated for the second quarter of 2013. It was reported that Mills was working on his second major-label album with artists such as Juicy J, Mike Posner, James Fauntleroy, Travis Barker, Layzie Bone and Skeme, with the production by Mills himself, alongside several other record producers such as Kane Beatz, 1500 or Nothin', Malay and Boi-1da, among others. On February 15, 2013, Mills announced that his first single for his second major-label album will be coming soon. On March 5, 2013, the audio for his song, called "Loud" was released for digital download. The following day, Mills released the music video for "Loud". The song was produced by Pop Wansel, and the song contains a sample of "I Know You Got Soul" performed by Eric B. and Rakim. He later said that "the hook for the song was one of his favorites out of all the hooks, he has ever written".

In April 2013, Mills was touring with a fellow American rapper Sammy Adams. On June 27, 2013, Mills was featured on Mike Posner's remix to "We Own It (Fast & Furious)", along with Sammy Adams and Niykee Heaton. In June 2013, Mills was on tour with We the Kings, and the fellow supporting acts The Ready Set and Breathe Carolina on the 2013's SummerFest. The music video for the single, called "All I Wanna Do", was shot and filmed in July 2013.

On February 18, 2014, Mills announced the release to his third EP, titled All I Wanna Do. Starting from February 24 to April 24, 2014, Mills will be headlining on his All I Wanna Do Tour. On February 24, 2014, while starting his promotional tour for his third EP, Mills released the audio to its title track "All I Wanna Do". The following day, Mills officially released the All I Wanna Do EP, via iTunes. The EP features production from Boi-1da and Malay, among others. In July 2015, Mills would change his stage name to his artistic name Travis Mills. On July 24, 2015, Travis released his new single, titled "Young & Stupid". The song features guest verse a fellow American rapper T.I.

=== 2016–present: Signing to First Access Entertainment, While You Wait and Girlfriends ===
On January 22, 2016, Travis announced the release of his new single, called "Don't Need Much". The song was released through Republic Records, which was made available for streaming on SoundCloud on the same day of release. The beat from "Don't Need Much" was sampled from a single named "Drank & Drugs", performed by Dutch rappers Lil' Kleine and Ronnie Flex. Travis signed a new label deal with First Access Entertainment and released his fourth EP under the label, titled While You Wait on April 8, 2016. The EP contains six tracks. Travis walked in the New York and Paris fashion shows in July 2016, and was named one of the best dressed by GQ Magazine.

In 2020, Mills formed the band Girlfriends with Nick Gross, with the duo citing Blink-182, 5 Seconds of Summer and All Time Low as the band's musical influences. The band released their first self-titled album on October 23, 2020 featuring 14 tracks. The band's second album, (E)motion Sickness, was released on June 17, 2022.

In March 2023, girlfriends released the single "Over My Dead Body" via Big Noise. girlfriends is slated to make an appearance on the 2026 Vans Warped Tour.

== Musical style ==
Mills' music has been described as genre-blending due to his mix of singing and rapping, being mostly labeled as a hip hop and synthpop artist. He is known for mixing pop and electronic songs with hip hop and R&B. Mills says that his genre-blending music is a result of his exposure to many different genres during childhood. He has said that "[my] mom was a huge Queen fan, my dad's a diehard Elvis fan, my uncle is a hip-hop and R&B head, my sister listened to Britney Spears, country and boy bands and I was into pop punk, punk rock, metal and just into everything." He indicated that his rapping style was influenced by Kanye West and Bone Thugs-n-Harmony, among others.

== Acting career ==
In March 2016, Mills made his acting debut in the Netflix original comedy series Flaked.

== Reality TV gigs ==
In 2019, he co-starred in a spinoff of Catfish: The TV Show called Ghosted: Love Gone Missing, where he teamed up with Bachelorette star Rachel Lindsay to help people find those who have ghosted them and find the real reasons for the sudden disappearance in the ghosted persons life. On April 26, 2022, he joined actress Rahne Jones to host MTV's brand-new docuseries, Help! I’m in a Secret Relationship! Mills and Jones help individuals in long-term romances find out why they are being hidden from their partner's family and friends.

== Personal life ==
Mills is heavily tattooed, which includes a full sleeve on one arm and a Bone Thugs-n-Harmony tattoo on his chest, in addition to many others. He also designated the letters "FTH" ("Fuck The Haters", "Forever The Highest") on his forehead, the "O" with a heart behind his left ear representing his sisters name and the word "Patience" tatted on his knuckles. Mills also had the word "Gnarly" tattooed across his stomach at age 18. A couple months later he got a tattoo of the Apple logo drawn on the palm of his hand.

Early in his career Mills sported large stretched earlobes, but proceeded with lobe reconstruction surgery in 2013.

Mills was in a relationship with actress Madelaine Petsch from 2017 to February 2020.

== Discography ==
=== Solo career ===
Studio albums

List of albums
Title	Details
Ready, Fire, Aim!	Released: September 28, 2010; Label: Uprising; Format: CD, digital download

Extended plays

List of EPs, with selected chart positions
Title	Details	Peak chart positions
Title	Details	US Rap
Finders Keepers EP	Released: July 14, 2009; Label: Uprising; Format: Digital download	—
Leaving Home EP	Released: January 13, 2012; Label: Columbia; Format: Digital download	—
All I Wanna Do	Released: February 25, 2014; Label: Columbia; Format: Digital download	16
While You Wait	Released: April 8, 2016; Label: First Access Entertainment; Format: Digital download	—
"—" denotes a title that did not chart, or was not released in that territory.

Mixtapes

- Leaving Home (2011)
- Thrillionaire (2012)

Singles

Year	Title	Album
2010	"Stupid Boy"	Ready, Fire, Aim!
2010	"She Got A..."	Ready, Fire, Aim!
2011	"Vans On"	Leaving Home EP
2012	"Lightweight"	Thrillionaire
2012	"Diemonds"	Thrillionaire
2013	"Loud"	Non-album single
2014	"All I Wanna Do"	All I Wanna Do
2015	"Young & Stupid" (featuring T.I.)	Non-album singles
2016	"Don't Need Much"	Non-album singles
2016	"One4Me"	Non-album singles
2017	"Off U"	Non-album singles
2017	"Bands Now" (featuring 24hrs)	Non-album singles
2017	"Just Like Us, This Song Doesn't Have a Title"	Non-album singles

=== With girlfriends ===
- girlfriends (2020)
- (e)motion sickness (2022)
- There Goes the Neighborhood (2025)

== Guest appearances ==
List of non-single guest appearances, with other performing artists, showing year released and album name
Title	Year	Other artist(s)	Album
"Those Nights"	2010	Her Demise My Rise	The Takeover
"Take the Crown"	2010	Her Demise My Rise	The Takeover
"Truth Be Told"	2010	Her Demise My Rise	The Takeover
"Southern"	2010	Her Demise My Rise	The Takeover
"Size of Your Boat" (Remix)	2010	Jeffree Star	—N/a
"Another One"	2012	Ty$, Dom Kennedy	Beach House
"Sally Walker"	2012	Audio Push	Inland Empire
"Started from the Bottom" (Remix)	2013	Mike Posner, Asher Roth, King Chip	—N/a
"We Own It" (Remix)	2013	Mike Posner, Sammy Adams, Niykee Heaton	—N/a
"Lowlife" (Remix)	2016	That Poppy	—N/a
"Question"	2016	Lauv	I Met You When I Was 18 (The Playlist)
"Say That Again"	2017	Eden xo	—N/a

== Filmography ==
Year	Film	Role	Notes
2015, 2021	Ridiculousness	Himself	Guest
2016	Flaked	Stefan	Recurring role
2018	Alone Together	Stainz	Episode: "Pootie"
2019	Good Girls	Tobin	Episode: "Thelma and Louise"
2019–2021	Ghosted: Love Gone Missing	Himself	Co-host
2020	Wild 'n Out	Himself	Guest
2020	2020 MTV Video Music Awards	Himself	Commentator at the Pre-Show
