= Stacy Morze =

American actor and musician

Ana Lovelis
- Also known as: Anastasia Lovelis
- Born: Stacy Morze
- Origin: Philadelphia
- Genres: Pop, Alternative
- Occupations: Drummer, actress, singer-songwriter
- Instruments: drums, percussion, vocals
- Website: http://www.analovelis.com

Stacy Morze is an American actress and musician best known for her role as Grace 'Lambchops' Lamb in Fame, and as the drummer for post punk group Uke til U Puke.

== Biography ==
Born in Philadelphia, Pennsylvania, Ana Lovelis starred in Annie on Broadway. While at Nazareth Academy High School she participated in many high school musicals. She was lead singer for the group The Brat Pack, that opened for Pretty Poison at a local teen club in the 1980s called Mardi Gras. After graduating from high school, Lovelis auditioned for the musical Fame, and won the original role of Grace Lambchops. It opened in Miami at the Coconut Grove Playhouse, then went on to Philadelphia and Baltimore. Ana ended up moving to New York City.

In 1999, Lovelis legally changed her name from "Stacy Morze" to "Ana Lovelis". She has a solo career and in 2004 released an album in the United States and Japan called Nothing But Love (Postal Service Madness) under DKE Records (US) and Trident Style (Japan). More recently, in April 2008 she released her second album digitally under her own label, Fallenwoman Music, entitled "Love Hit Ya Like a Train". Currently Ana lives in Los Angeles, California and was the lead singer for Doxy which was active in the Los Angeles Live Music Scene from 2004 to 2007. She is the mother of Nia and Rena Lovelis from Hey Violet.

She has accompanied her daughters on tour since they began touring with 5 Seconds of Summer.

In August 2016 she started a podcast called True Lovelis where she answers questions and offers advice to listeners.

Lovelis was one of the investors of the Witch's Cottage, located in North Hollywood, Los Angeles.
