= Jonas Bevacqua =

American clothing designer and entrepreneur

Jonas Gregory Bevacqua
- Born: October 23, 1977
- Died: May 30, 2011 (aged 33)
- Known for: co-founder of Lifted Research Group
- Children: 1

Jonas Bevacqua (October 23, 1977 – May 30, 2011) was an American clothing designer and entrepreneur.

== Early life ==
Jonas Gregory Bevacqua was born October 23, 1977, and was adopted into a family with six other adopted children of different races and ethnicities. He was of Vietnamese descent.

== Career ==
In 1999 he co-founded Lifted Research Group (LRG) with Robert Wright.

After Bevacqua dropped out of college and moved back home with his parents, he met fellow LRG founder Robert Wright when they were both working as DJs in Southern California clubs. Heavily influenced by Southern California's skateboard, surfing, and hip hop culture; Bevacqua and Wright started designing and making clothes that reflected their interests but were not available at the time.

By 2007 Entrepreneur placed LRG at No. 5 on its "Hot 500" list of fastest-growing companies, with 2006 sales coming in at $150 million.

== Death ==
Jonas Bevacqua was found dead at his Laguna Beach home on May 31, 2011. He was 33 years old. In November 2011, Orange County Coroner's Office determined that Bevacqua died of natural causes. Bevacqua was survived by his fiancée, son, parents and seven siblings.
