= This Is the End of Control =

2012 studio album by Cherri Bomb

Studio album by Cherri Bomb
- Released: May 15, 2012
- Studios: Red Decibel, Brea, California (Note: Parts of "Let It Go" were recorded at The Steakhouse.)
- Genres: Hard rock; alternative rock
- Length: 37:35
- Label: Hollywood
- Producers: Red Decibel (Note: Adam Watts, Andy Dodd and Gannin Arnold); Bobby Huff

Cherri Bomb chronology
Stark (2011)	This Is the End of Control (2012)	I Can Feel It (2015)

Singles from This Is the End of Control
- 1. "Shake the Ground" Released: 2012; 2. "Too Many Faces" Released: 2012

This Is the End of Control is the only studio album by American rock band Cherri Bomb. It was released on May 15, 2012, by Hollywood Records. Prior to the album's release, its song "Shake the Ground" was featured on The Avengers soundtrack. The album also features the song "Let It Go" from the band's 2011 debut EP Stark. This Is the End of Control peaked at number 24 on Billboard's Top Hard Rock Albums chart and at number 11 on its Top Heatseekers chart.

== Background and recording ==
Guitarist Miranda Miller described writing the album as an "extremely creative" process done by the four band members and their producers. She said they wrote so many songs, that it became difficult to decide which ones to include on the album. Miller cited the band being new to recording as the most difficult part. Describing the members as perfectionists, she said they had to learn when to stop.

The title, This Is the End of Control, is a lyric from the band's song "Shake the Ground". Lead guitarist and vocalist Julia Pierce said it is a message of empowerment, meaning, that even though the members are minors, they plan to make the decisions that are best for them; "As teenagers, as a band that really doesn't fit the mold, we don't want people trying to control us or tell us to be something that we're not."

== Reception ==
Professional ratings
Review scores
Source	Rating
AllMusic	4/5 stars
Loud Magazine Australia	78%
Sputnikmusic	3.5/5 stars
PopMatters	6/10 stars

In her review for AllMusic, Heather Phares declared "This Is the End of Control proves that Cherri Bomb is a straight-ahead rock band with talent, a rarity in the 2010s no matter how old or what sex the people in the band are". She concluded by calling the album an "impressive debut" and "while the band's talent should guard against them being treated like a novelty, the most rebellious move the women of Cherri Bomb may make is just being who they are". Writing for Girls' Life, Rachael Ellenbogen wrote that in a music industry full of "pop princesses and auto-tuned maniacs", This Is the End of Control is "a breath of fresh, angst-infused air" with songs that stand out. Brian Giffin of Loud Magazine Australia commented that "Cherri Bomb have been attracting all the right kinds of attention, and much of it has even been for all the right reasons". He describes the album as "a punchy collection of exuberant and catchy tunes that should bring a smile to the face of even the most cynical" and compliments the hooks the band writes. He concludes by calling the album a "pretty solid debut".

Zachary Houle of PopMatters rated the album a 6/10, calling the album "decent enough, with no real surprises and the odd clanger in the lyrics department here and there".

== Track listing ==
No.	Title	Writer(s)	Lead vocals	Length
1.	"Take This Now"	Adam Watts	Julia Pierce; Miranda Miller	0:47
2.	"Better This Way"	Cherri Bomb; Watts; Andy Dodd; Gannin Arnold	Pierce	2:48
3.	"Raw. Real."	Cherri Bomb; Arnold; Dodd; Watts; Anastasia Lovelis; Kenny Enea	Pierce; Rena Lovelis	2:37
4.	"Shake the Ground"	Cherri Bomb; Arnold; Dodd; Watts	Pierce	2:42
5.	"Too Many Faces"	Cherri Bomb; Arnold; Dodd; Watts	Pierce	4:44
6.	"Let It Go"	Bobby Huff; A. Lovelis	Pierce	3:39
7.	"Sacrificial Lamb"	Cherri Bomb; Arnold; Watts	Nia Lovelis	2:55
8.	"Act the Part"	Cherri Bomb; Arnold; Watts; A. Lovelis	R. Lovelis	3:38
9.	"Drawing a Blank"	Arnold; Dodd; Watts; A. Lovelis	Pierce	2:47
10.	"Heart is a Hole"	Huff; A. Lovelis	Pierce	4:14
11.	"Paper Doll"	Cherri Bomb; Watts; Dodd; Arnold	Miller	3:42
12.	"Hold On"	Cherri Bomb; Watts; Arnold; Dodd; A. Lovelis	R. Lovelis	3:02
Total length:				37:35

== Personnel ==
Cherri Bomb

- Julia Pierce – lead guitar, backing vocals, co-lead vocals on tracks 1 & 3, lead vocals on tracks 2, 4–6, 9 & 10
- Miranda Miller – rhythm guitar, keyboards, backing vocals, co-lead vocals on track 1, lead vocals on track 11
- Rena Lovelis – bass guitar, backing vocals, co-lead vocals on track 3, lead vocals on tracks 8 & 12
- Nia Lovelis – drums, backing vocals, lead vocals on track 7

Production

- Red Decibel (Adam Watts, Andy Dodd and Gannin Arnold) – producer
- Bobby Huff – producer on "Heart is a Hole"
- Noah Lifschey – additional production on "Let It Go"
- Chris Lord-Alge – mixing
- Adam Watts – mixing on "Take This Now"
- Neal Avron – mixing on "Let It Go"
- Ted Jensen – mastering

== Charts ==
Chart (2011)	Peak position
US Top Hard Rock Albums (Billboard)	24
US Heatseekers Albums (Billboard)	11
