= Hey Violet =

American pop rock band (2008–2024)

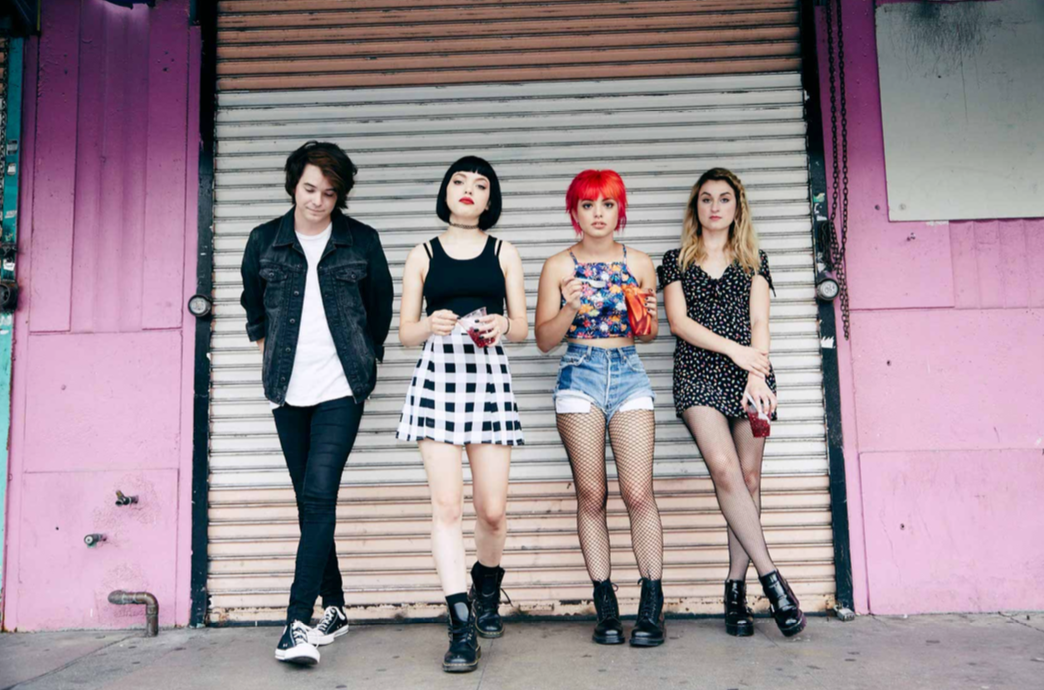
- Hey Violet in January 2016. From left to right: Casey Moreta, Rena Lovelis, Nia Lovelis, and Miranda Miller.

Background information
- Also known as: Cherri Bomb (2008–2015)
- Origin: Los Angeles, California, U.S.
- Genres: Pop rock; electropop; pop punk; pop; EDM; hard rock (early)
- Works: Hey Violet discography
- Years active: 2008–2024
- Labels: Hollywood; Hi or Hey; Capitol; Hopeless
- Past members: Julia Pierce; Miranda Miller; Rena Lovelis; Nia Lovelis; Casey Moreta; Iain Shipp
- Website: heyviolet.com

Hey Violet was an American pop rock band from Los Angeles, California. Its final lineup consisted of Rena Lovelis (lead vocals, bass), Nia Lovelis (drums, percussion, piano, keyboards, synthesizers, backing vocals), and Casey Moreta (lead and rhythm guitar, backing vocals).

Formed in 2008 as Cherri Bomb while its members were still in middle school, the band was originally an all-female hard rock group, consisting of Julia Pierce (lead vocals, lead guitar), Miranda Miller (rhythm guitar, keyboards, backing vocals), Rena Lovelis (bass, backing vocals), and Nia Lovelis (drums, percussion, backing vocals). In 2013, Pierce left the band and was later replaced by Casey Moreta. In 2015, the group changed their name to Hey Violet and drastically altered their sound. They later signed to Hi or Hey Records, founded by 5 Seconds of Summer, whom they supported on the Rock Out with Your Socks Out and Sounds Live Feels Live tours.

Iain Shipp (bass guitar, synth bass, keyboards) joined the band officially in September 2016 but left in 2019. In August 2017, Miller announced her departure from the band via social media.

On May 31, 2024, Hey Violet formally announced on their social media that the band was breaking up on June 28, 2024, following the release of their final album Aftertaste.

== History ==
=== 2008–2013: Cherri Bomb and Pierce's departure ===
Cherri Bomb consisted of Julia Pierce on vocals and lead guitar, sisters Nia and Rena Lovelis on drums and bass respectively, and second guitarist Miranda Miller. Although all four were born on the east coast of the United States, they each moved to California for better opportunities in music. Pierce said that at around 10 or 11 years old she had the vision of forming a rock band with girls her own age, and eventually recruited the other members after putting flyers up around Los Angeles and advertisements on Craigslist. Nia was the first she teamed up with and, after trying out some other musicians, Miller joined after sending them videos of her playing and singing. Needing a bassist to complete the lineup, they asked Nia's sister Rena, who played guitar, to take up bass temporarily, but it became permanent. Miller stated that the group formed with the concept of all four being capable of singing lead on different songs. The name Cherri Bomb originated from the book Cherry Bomb – The Ultimate Guide to Becoming a Better Flirt, a Tougher Chick, and a Hotter Girlfriend, and to Living Life Like a Rock Star by Carrie Borzillo, which Nia and Rena were reading and recommended to the others. Miller said, "After reading it, we kinda decided that name really fit our personality because it is about being a rocker chick. It was really just cute, funny and awesome".

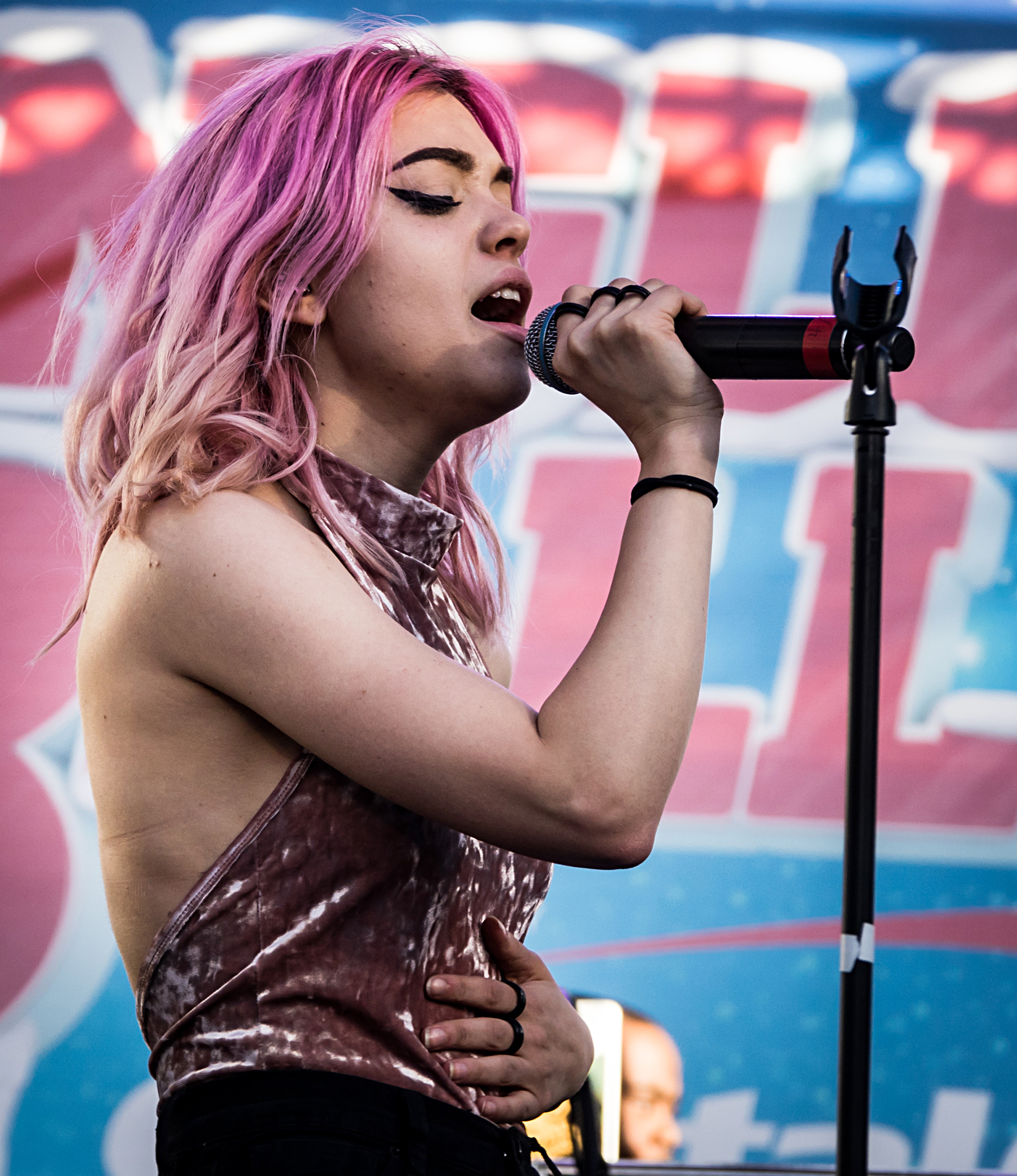
Rena Lovelis (shown performing with Hey Violet in December 2016) originally joined Cherri Bomb as bassist

Rena said her first show with the band was to an audience of 40,000 on Independence Day 2009 at Warner Park in Woodland Hills, Los Angeles. Nia and Rena's mother, Anastasia, had previously played in a band with former Hole and Mötley Crüe drummer Samantha Maloney. Maloney took on the job of managing Cherri Bomb and got them their first tour, opening for the Smashing Pumpkins in 2010. On June 14, 2011, they signed to Hollywood Records, and on October 18, 2011, they released their debut EP, Stark. It includes a cover of "The Pretender", which the Deseret News reported earned them a spot opening for the Foo Fighters after Dave Grohl heard it.

Cherri Bomb were also an opening act for bands such as Bush, Camp Freddy, Filter, Staind and Steel Panther. They played European festivals, including Oxegen in Ireland (the youngest act to appear), T in the Park in Scotland, Sonisphere and the Reading and Leeds Festivals. The band released their first studio album, This Is the End of Control, on May 15, 2012, which charted on Billboard's Top Hard Rock Albums at number 24 and Top Heatseekers at number 11. They appeared on the Warped Tour in July–August 2012. In August 2012, they toured with the Welsh rock band Lostprophets.

On January 23, 2013, Cherri Bomb announced on their Facebook page that they had parted ways with Pierce. When asked the reasoning behind the departure, Miller commented on her Tumblr that it was due to "creative differences", and that "we went our separate ways because we wanted to go in one direction and she wanted to go in another." However, after Pierce's departure was announced she took to her own Facebook page and clarified that she did not leave the band voluntarily. Pierce stated, "When I started Cherri Bomb five years ago, I envisioned something beautiful for this band. It's unfortunate that I'm no longer part of it. Sadly, what has happened wasn't my decision. I never imagined it ending up this way." Pierce later reflected on the split in 2017 saying, that, with the members all being minors, their parents "made things so much more complicated. It just got to a point where we weren't working together anymore. It was obvious that the families really wanted to go in a different direction than I did, so we parted ways. It worked out for the best. Now they're doing what they want to do and so am I."

In February 2013, the band also parted ways with Hollywood Records. That same month, the remaining members announced that they were writing new material and wanted to explore different musical avenues and not "put a definition on what our sound will turn out to be". Miller said that her and Rena were taking over lead vocals and that they were open to finding another lead guitarist or just staying a trio; "We're currently jamming with some friends and great musicians and trying different things out." Guitarist Casey Moreta joined Cherri Bomb that year on a temporary basis. On March 9, 2013, Moreta was asked to join the band permanently while performing on stage at The Viper Room.

=== 2015–2018: Rebranding as Hey Violet and From the Outside ===
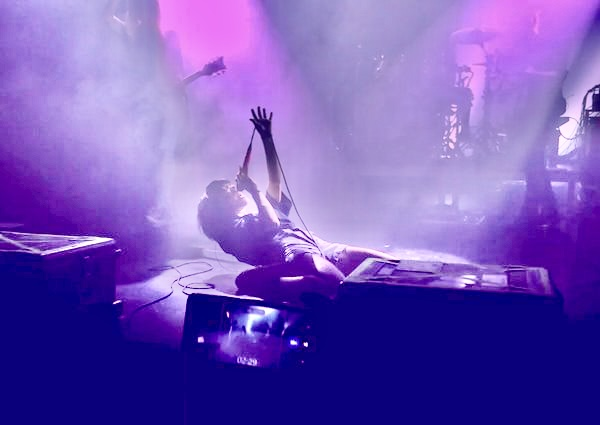
Hey Violet performing in 2015

On February 18, 2015, after Pierce's departure the remaining members announced on their official YouTube channel that they had changed their name to Hey Violet. On March 19, 2015, they released their new single "This Is Why". On March 24, it was confirmed that they would be signed to Hi or Hey Records, 5 Seconds of Summer's partnership of Capitol Records. On June 15, Hey Violet announced that they would be releasing their first EP I Can Feel It in July. The band were the opening support act for 5 Seconds of Summer on the European and North American legs of their Rock Out with Your Socks Out Tour. In both the European and USA/Canadian legs of the tour, they played free acoustic sets outside the show venues for fans. The band also went on its own European headlining tour in winter 2015. It was during this tour that Rena Lovelis stopped playing the bass to focus on her vocals, and a temporary bassist was brought on. They continued to open for 5SOS on the North American leg of their 2016 Sounds Live Feels Live World Tour. During this tour, new touring bassist Iain Shipp was introduced, and was later made an official member of the band in September 2016.

Their second EP Brand New Moves was released in August 2016, with follow-up single "Guys My Age" in September 2016. The song was the group's first commercial success, charting in the United States, Canada, and Australia.

In March 2017, "Break My Heart" was released as the second single from their second studio album, From the Outside. The album was released on June 16, 2017. The song had minor commercial success. The third and final single, "Hoodie" was released in August. On August 31, Miller announced her departure from the band via the group's social media accounts, stating that touring had become "grueling".

Looking back on the beginning years of Hey Violet, Rena admitted that they were "feeling put into a bit of a box," not getting to explore their sound as much as they wanted to.

=== 2019–2024: Singles, Shipp's departure, Aftertaste, and disbandment ===
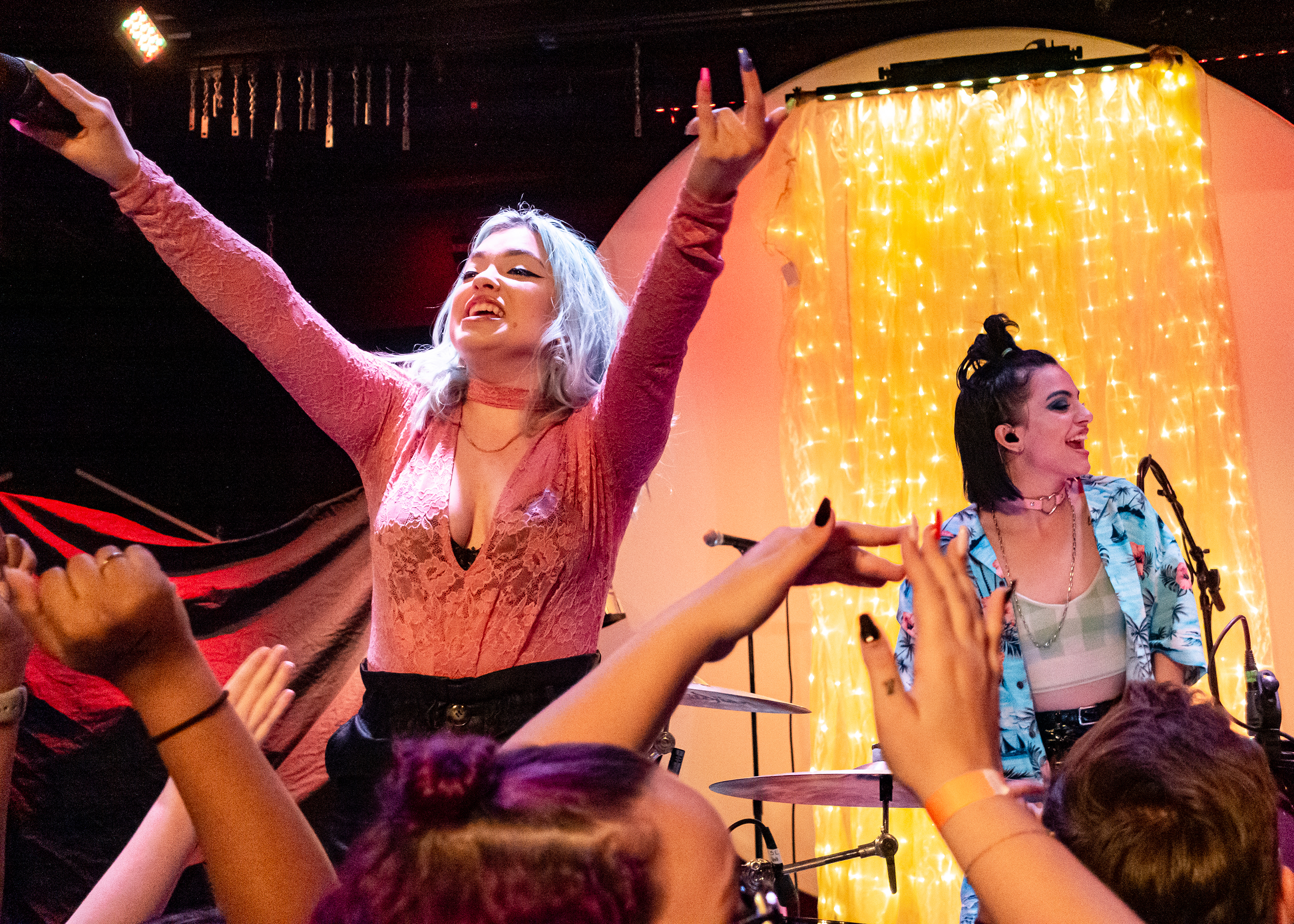
Rena and Nia Lovelis performing in 2020

The band released a new single titled "Better by Myself" on April 12, 2019, along with a music video, directed by Marcella Cytrynowicz.

On April 16, 2019, following allegations of sexual assault, Hey Violet announced Shipp's departure from the band via Twitter.

Throughout 2019, the band released a slew of singles, including "Close My Eyes" on June 21, "Queen of the Night" on July 19, and "Clean" on October 17.

On March 12, 2021, after not releasing any music for the year of 2020, the band released a new single called "Friends Like This" and announced they would release three more EPs that, according to Hollywood Life, are about loss, falling to their vices and growing from your mistakes. Rena admits that "Friends Like This" is about "how [she] leaned into so many unhealthy habits trying to escape [her] own mind that [she] couldn't even connect" with those around her. The first EP in the series, Problems, addresses loss and loneliness, while the second EP focuses on vices that "satiate the longing for wholeness." Problems was released on June 18, 2021. On October 22, 2021, the second EP in the series, Deep End was released. The final EP in the series, Bloom, was released on April 29, 2022.

On October 6, 2023, it was announced that the band had signed to Hopeless Records and released their first single for the label, "I Should Call My Friends," on October 13, 2023. The track was produced by John O'Callaghan of the Maine.

On May 31, 2024, Hey Violet announced on their Instagram page that the band would be breaking up shortly after the release of their final album Aftertaste. The album includes the final songs they had been working on before they made the decision to end the band. On September 27, 2024, the band released their final song, "Bittersweet." The song is intended as an encapsulation of the band's nine years together. On October 27, 2024, the band performed one final concert at The Lodge.

== Musical style ==
Hey Violet's musical style has been described as pop punk, pop, EDM pop rock, and electropop. Rena has cited female musicians like Alanis Morissette, Amy Winehouse, Hayley Williams, Janis Joplin, Kate Bush, Stevie Nicks, and Taylor Swift as influences, while Nia draws inspiration from Beyoncé and Madonna's performances. As Cherri Bomb, their music was referred to as hard rock and alternative rock. Pierce cited the Foo Fighters, My Chemical Romance, Muse, Paramore, and the Smashing Pumpkins as influences on the original band.

== Band members ==
Final members

- Rena Lovelis – lead vocals (2013–2024), bass guitar (2008–2016, 2019–2024, studio only), backing vocals (2008–2013)
- Nia Lovelis – drums, percussion, piano, backing vocals (2008–2024), keyboards, synthesizers (2019–2024)
- Casey Moreta – lead guitar, backing vocals (2013–2024), rhythm guitar (2017–2024)

Former members

- Julia Pierce – lead guitar, lead vocals (2008–2013)
- Miranda Miller – rhythm guitar, keyboards, backing vocals (2008–2017), synthesizers (2008–2017)
- Iain Shipp – bass guitar, synth bass (2016–2019), keyboards (2017–2019)

Touring members

- Edison Lo – bass (2015)
- Vicky Warwick – bass guitar, synth bass, keyboards (2019–2024)

Timeline

== Discography ==
- This Is the End of Control (2012)
- From the Outside (2017)
- Aftertaste (2024)

== Awards ==
Year	Nominated	Award	Category	Result	Ref
2016	Hey Violet	Teen Choice Awards	Choice Music: Next Big Thing	Won	
2017	"Break My Heart"	Musical.ly	Musical.ly's #NextWaveApril	Won	
2017	Hey Violet	iHeart Radio Music Awards	Best Underground Alternative Band	Nominated	
2017	"Guys My Age"	Teen Choice Awards	Choice Song: Group	Nominated	
2018	Hey Violet	Radio Disney Music Awards	The Freshest—Best New Artist	Nominated	

== Tours ==
Headlining

- Hey Violet (2017)
- Hey Violet Live (2019)
- Better Than I've Ever Been Tour (2022)

Promotional

- From The Outside UK Tour (2017)

Supporting

- 5 Seconds of Summer – Rock Out with Your Socks Out Tour (2014–2015)
- 5 Seconds of Summer – Sounds Live Feels Live World Tour (2016)
- Olivia O’Brien – It Was a Sad F*cking Tour (2020)
