= Lifted Research Group =

American clothing brand

Lifted Research Group, Inc.
- Industry: Apparel
- Founded: 1999 in Orange County, California
- Headquarters: Irvine, California, U.S.
- Area served: Worldwide
- Website: www.l-r-g.com

Lifted Research Group, commonly known as LRG, is an American clothing brand headed by Jonas Bevacqua and Robert Wright and based in Orange County, California. LRG produces clothing and accessories and also has been known to develop a broad range of products consisting of electronic accessories, extreme vehicles, and outdoor equipment including sporting goods and more. The company is also involved in the promotion of underground recording artists and sponsors a skateboarding team.

Entrepreneur magazine ranked the company at #5 on its 2007 Hot 500 list of fastest-growing companies.

== History ==
Lifted Research Group was founded in 1999 by Jonas Bevacqua and Robert Wright. Wright brought extensive experience in the streetwear industry to LRG, having worked with such companies as Quiksilver, O'Neill, and Katin during eight years. He also contributed the resources to create the company's initial samples and patterns. Bevacqua also raised the initial start-up capital from friends of his adopted father, who worked in the fashion industry. This capital was used to finance an initial product run that sold out on their first day at the Action Sports Retailer Expo in San Diego, California. The company made its first $1 million in 2000, and the company became profitable by 2002.

In late 2005, LRG announced their new women's clothing line named Luxirie, which targets women aged 18 to 30 years old. Designs from the label cover six themes, ranging from Western to military, and include signature items such as crystal-covered jeans. The label launched in the United States and Canada in the fall of 2006. LRG has since launched its products in other countries, as well as hosting an international skate team. Rider Marek Zaprazny has been a star in their international team. In the fall of 2006, wireless provider T-Mobile launched a limited edition Sidekick III designed by LRG. It featured a green-on-green theme that made liberal use of LRG's logo. After a production run of 10,000 units, T-Mobile's website reported that it was sold out.

On May 31, 2011, Jonas Bevacqua was found dead of natural causes, aged 33.

LRG began to renew its designs by hiring Nick Bower in 2017. In 2018, LRG collaborated with artists Jon Z, Chip The Ripper, Rvssian and Jhay Cortez among others. In 2019, LRG partnered with Apple Music as an official playlist curator.
