= Poppy discography =

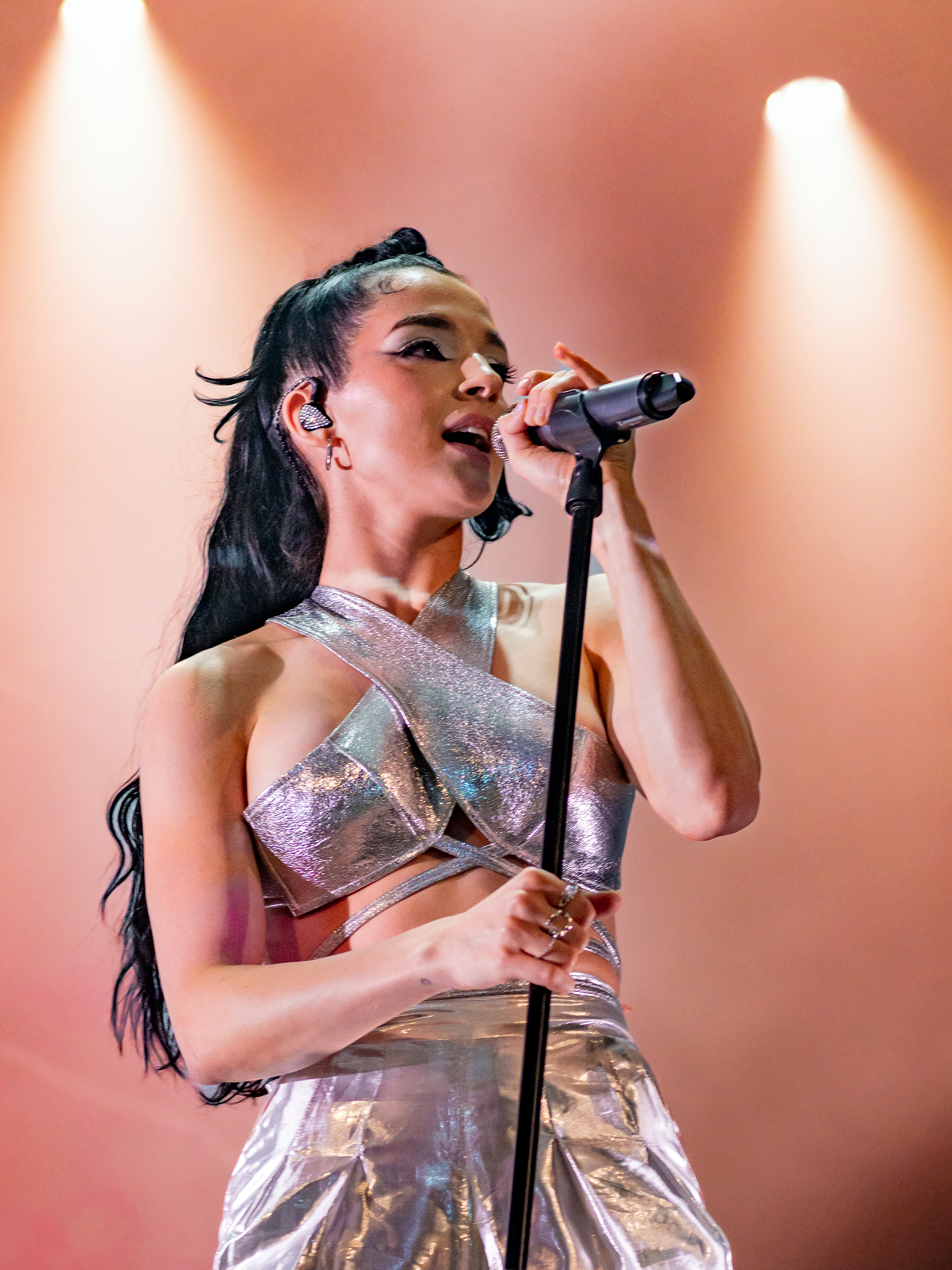
- Poppy performing in 2023
- Studio albums: 7
- EPs: 6
- Soundtrack albums: 3
- Singles: 44
- Music videos: 45
- Promotional singles: 12
- Reissue: 1

The discography of American singer Poppy consists of seven studio albums, one reissue, three soundtrack albums, six extended plays (EPs), 44 singles (including six as a featured artist), 12 promotional singles, and 45 music videos. Poppy released her debut EP, Bubblebath under the moniker "That Poppy" through Island Records. It included the song "Lowlife", which became her most-viewed music video on YouTube.

After signing with Mad Decent, Poppy would release her art pop debut studio album Poppy.Computer, which spawned five singles. The album was included in Rolling Stone's list of 20 Best Pop Albums of 2017, and would peak at number 11 on Billboard's Heatseekers Albums chart. Her follow-up album, Am I a Girl?, was released in late 2018, and featured a collaboration with American DJ Diplo on the song "Time Is Up". The second half of the album featured Poppy adopting a more rock and nu metal-influenced sound, which she would expand upon in her EP Choke, released in June 2019 as her final record with the label.

Poppy signed with Sumerian Records and released her third studio album I Disagree in January 2020. Fully delving in to the rock and metal influences she had dabbled in on her previous works, the album quickly became Poppy's breakthrough and most acclaimed album to that point, and became her first album to impact the Billboard 200 chart as well as many other countries, and sold 7,000 copies during its first week. Her fourth studio album, Flux, was released in September 2021, which marked a departure from the metal sound of I Disagree, incorporating elements of alternative rock and grunge with a more organic production style.

Her fifth studio album, Zig, was released in October 2023, and marked her return to the pop sound. In January 2024, Poppy released her commercial breakthrough single "V.A.N" with Bad Omens which entered several rock charts, followed by "Suffocate" with Knocked Loose. Later that year, she began collaborating with British record producer Jordan Fish and released her sixth studio album Negative Spaces, which contained the critically-acclaimed single "New Way Out". In 2025, she released "End of You" with Amy Lee and Courtney LaPlante which made history as the first song led by three female artists to top Billboard's Mainstream Rock Airplay chart. Her seventh studio album Empty Hands, released in 2026, became her second album to enter the Billboard 200 chart.

== Albums ==
=== Studio albums ===
List of studio albums, with selected chart positions and sales figures
| Title | Details | Peak chart positions | | | | | | | | | Sales |
| Title | Details | US | US Indie | US Rock | AUS | GER | SCO | UK | UK Indie | UK Rock | Sales |
|---|---|---|---|---|---|---|---|---|---|---|---|
| Poppy.Computer | Released: October 6, 2017; Label: I'm Poppy, Mad Decent; Formats: CD, digital download, LP, streaming | — (Note: Poppy.Computer did not enter the Billboard 200, but peaked at number 11 on the Heatseekers Albums chart.) | 33 | — | — | — | — | — | — | — | |
| Am I a Girl? | Released: October 31, 2018; Label: I'm Poppy, Mad Decent; Formats: CD, digital download, LP, streaming | — | — | — | — | — | — | — | — | — | |
| I Disagree | Released: January 10, 2020; Label: Sumerian; Formats: CD, digital download, LP, streaming | 130 | 12 | 15 | — (Note: I Disagree did not enter the ARIA Albums Chart, but peaked at number 19 on the ARIA Digital Album Chart.) | — | 67 | — (Note: I Disagree did not enter the Official Albums Chart but peaked at number 48 on the Official Albums Sales chart.) | 11 | 1 | US: 7,000 |
| Flux | Released: September 24, 2021; Label: Sumerian; Formats: CD, digital download, LP, streaming | — (Note: Flux did not enter the Billboard 200, but peaked at number 60 on the Top Current Albums Sales chart.) | — | — | — | — | — | — (Note: Flux did not enter the Official Albums Chart but peaked at number 46 on the Official Albums Downloads chart.) | 40 | 16 | US: 5,000 |
| Zig | Released: October 27, 2023; Label: Sumerian; Formats: CD, digital download, LP, streaming | — (Note: Zig did not enter the Billboard 200, but peaked at number 27 on the Top Album Sales chart.) | — | — | — | — | 74 | — (Note: Zig did not enter the Official Albums Chart but peaked at number 58 on the Official Albums Sales chart.) | — | — | US: 6,000 |
| Negative Spaces | Released: November 15, 2024; Label: Sumerian; Formats: CD, digital download, LP, streaming | — (Note: Negative Spaces did not enter the Billboard 200, but peaked at number 46 on the Top Album Sales chart.) | — | — | — | — | — | — (Note: Negative Spaces did not enter the Official Albums Chart but peaked at number 94 on the Official Albums Sales chart.) | — | 10 | US: 24,500 |
| Empty Hands | Released: January 23, 2026; Label: Sumerian; Formats: CD, digital download, LP, streaming | 137 | 23 | — | 7 | 22 | 15 | 82 | 6 | 2 | US: 11,000 |
"—" denotes items which did not chart in that country.

=== Reissues ===
List of reissues, with selected chart positions
| Title | Details | Peak chart positions |
| Title | Details | UK Indie Break. |
|---|---|---|
| I Disagree (More) | Released: August 14, 2020; Label: Sumerian; Formats: Digital download, LP, streaming | 19 |

=== Soundtrack albums ===
List of soundtrack albums
| Title | Details |
|---|---|
| 3:36 (Music to Sleep To) | Released: October 17, 2016; Label: N/A (self-released); Formats: Digital download, streaming |
| I C U: Music to Read To | Released: July 19, 2019; Label: I'm Poppy; Formats: Digital download, LP, streaming |
| Music to Scream To | Released: October 20, 2020; Label: Sumerian; Formats: Digital download, LP, streaming |

== Extended plays ==
List of extended plays, with selected sales figures
| Title | Details | Sales |
|---|---|---|
| Bubblebath (Note: Released under the stage name That Poppy) | Released: February 12, 2016; Label: Island; Formats: Digital download, streaming | |
| Poppy.Remixes | Released: March 16, 2018; Label: I'm Poppy, Mad Decent; Formats: Digital download, streaming | |
| Choke | Released: June 28, 2019; Label: I'm Poppy, Mad Decent; Formats: Cassette, digital download, streaming | |
| A Very Poppy Christmas | Released: December 1, 2020; Label: Sumerian; Formats: Digital download, streaming, vinyl | US: 960 |
| Eat (NXT Soundtrack) | Released: June 8, 2021; Label: Sumerian; Formats: Cassette, digital download, streaming, vinyl | US: 720 |
| Stagger | Released: October 14, 2022; Label: Republic, Lava; Formats: Digital download, streaming, vinyl | US: 185 |

== Singles ==
=== As lead artist ===
List of singles as lead artist, with selected chart positions, showing year released and album name
| Title | Year | Peak chart positions | | | | | | | | Album |
| Title | Year | US Bub. | US Dig. | US Main | US Rock | NZ Hot | UK | UK Indie | UK Rock | Album |
|---|---|---|---|---|---|---|---|---|---|---|
| "Everybody Wants to Be Poppy" | 2015 | — | — | — | — | — | — | — | — | Non-album single |
| "Lowlife" | 2015 | — | — | — | — | — | — | — | — | Bubblebath |
| "I'm Poppy" | 2017 | — | — | — | — | — | — | — | — | Poppy.Computer |
| "Computer Boy" | 2017 | — | — | — | — | — | — | — | — | Poppy.Computer |
| "Let's Make a Video" | 2017 | — | — | — | — | — | — | — | — | Poppy.Computer |
| "Interweb" | 2017 | — | — | — | — | — | — | — | — | Poppy.Computer |
| "My Style" (featuring Charlotte) | 2017 | — | — | — | — | — | — | — | — | Poppy.Computer |
| "In a Minute" | 2018 | — | — | — | — | — | — | — | — | Am I a Girl? |
| "Time Is Up" (featuring Diplo) | 2018 | — | — | — | — | — | — | — | — | Am I a Girl? |
| "Fashion After All" | 2018 | — | — | — | — | — | — | — | — | Am I a Girl? |
| "Hard Feelings" | 2018 | — | — | — | — | — | — | — | — | Am I a Girl? |
| "X" | 2018 | — | — | — | — | — | — | — | — | Am I a Girl? |
| "Voicemail" | 2019 | — | — | — | — | — | — | — | — | Choke |
| "Scary Mask" (featuring Fever 333) | 2019 | — | — | — | — | — | — | — | — | Choke |
| "Choke" | 2019 | — | — | — | — | — | — | — | — | Choke |
| "Concrete" | 2019 | — | — | — | — | — | — | — | — | I Disagree |
| "I Disagree" | 2019 | — | — | — | — | — | — | — | — | I Disagree |
| "Bloodmoney" | 2019 | — | — | — | — | — | — | — | — | I Disagree |
| "Fill the Crown" | 2019 | — | — | — | — | — | — | — | — | I Disagree |
| "Khaos x4" | 2020 | — | — | — | — | — | — | — | — | I Disagree |
| "Her" | 2021 | — | — | — | — | — | — | — | — | Flux |
| "Flux" | 2021 | — | — | — | — | — | — | — | — | Flux |
| "So Mean" | 2021 | — | — | — | — | — | — | — | — | Flux |
| "Dead Flowers" (with Health) | 2021 | — | — | — | — | — | — | — | — | Disco4: Part II |
| "FYB" | 2022 | — | — | — | — | — | — | — | — | Stagger |
| "Church Outfit" | 2023 | — | — | — | — | — | — | — | — | Zig |
| "Knockoff" | 2023 | — | — | — | — | — | — | — | — | Zig |
| "Motorbike" | 2023 | — | — | — | — | — | — | — | — | Zig |
| "Hard" | 2023 | — | — | — | — | — | — | — | — | Zig |
| "V.A.N" (with Bad Omens) | 2024 | — | — | 9 | 39 | — | — (Note: "V.A.N" did not enter the UK singles chart, but peaked at number 88 on the UK Singles Sales Chart.) | — | 25 | Concrete Jungle [The OST] |
| "New Way Out" | 2024 | — | — | 9 | — (Note: "New Way Out" did not enter the Hot Rock & Alternative Songs chart, but peaked at number 16 on the Hot Hard Rock Songs chart.) | — | — | — | — | Negative Spaces |
| "They're All Around Us" | 2024 | — | — | — | — | — | — | — | — | Negative Spaces |
| "The Cost of Giving Up" / "Crystallized" | 2024 | — | — | 7 | — | — | — | — | — | Negative Spaces |
| "The Cost of Giving Up" / "Crystallized" | 2024 | — | — | — | — | — | — | — | — | Negative Spaces |
| "End of You" (with Amy Lee and Courtney LaPlante) | 2025 | 25 | 5 | 1 | 18 | 13 | 93 | 31 | 14 | Non-album single |
| "Unravel" | 2025 | — | — | — | — | — | — | — | — | Empty Hands |
| "Bruised Sky" | 2025 | — | — | — | — | — | — | — | — | Empty Hands |
| "Guardian" | 2025 | — | — | — | — | — | — | — | — | Empty Hands |
| "Time Will Tell" | 2026 | — | — | 17 | — | 35 | — | — | — | Empty Hands |
"—" denotes items which did not chart in that country.

=== As featured artist ===
List of singles as featured artist, with selected chart positions, showing year released and album name
| Title | Year | Peak chart positions | | | | Album |
| Title | Year | US Rock | JPN Billboard Down. | JPN Oricon Dig. | UK Sales | Album |
|---|---|---|---|---|---|---|
| "Between the Bars" (Roman featuring Poppy) | 2012 | — | — | — | — | Non-album singles |
| "Hide and Seek" (Eppic featuring Poppy) | 2013 | — | — | — | — | Non-album singles |
| "They'll Just Love You" (Stu Brooks featuring Poppy and Danny Elfman) | 2023 | — | — | — | — | 40HZ |
| "Suffocate" (Knocked Loose featuring Poppy) | 2024 | 50 | — | — | — | You Won't Go Before You're Supposed To |
| "From Me to U" (Babymetal featuring Poppy) | 2025 | — (Note: "From Me to U" did not enter the Hot Rock & Alternative Songs chart, but peaked at number nine on the Hot Hard Rock Songs chart.) | 27 | 24 | 65 | Metal Forth |
| "In Death We've Just Begun" (Ryan Lott featuring Poppy and Son Lux) | 2026 | — | — | — | — | Marathon, Vol. I: Somewhere in the Heavens (Original Game Soundtrack) |
"—" denotes items which did not chart in that country.

=== Promotional singles ===
List of promotional singles, with selected chart positions, showing year released and album name
| Title | Year | Peak chart positions | Album |
| Title | Year | US Rock | Album |
|---|---|---|---|
| "Adored" | 2016 | — | Non-album promotional singles |
| "Metal" | 2018 | — | Non-album promotional singles |
| "Immature Couture" | 2018 | — | Non-album promotional singles |
| "All the Things She Said" | 2020 | 41 | Non-album promotional singles |
| "I Won't Be Home for Christmas" | 2020 | — | A Very Poppy Christmas |
| "Fear of Dying" | 2021 | — | Non-album promotional singles |
| "3.14" | 2022 | — | Non-album promotional singles |
| "Spit" | 2023 | — | Non-album promotional singles |
| "Moonage Daydream" | 2023 | — | Non-album promotional singles |
| "Taste" | 2025 | — | Non-album promotional singles |
| "Last Christmas" | 2025 | — | Non-album promotional singles |
| "Hand in My Pocket" | 2026 | — | ‘Mile End Kicks’ - Music Inspired by the Motion Picture |
"—" denotes items which did not chart in that country.

== Other charted songs ==
List of other charted songs, with selected chart position, showing year released and album name
| Title | Year | Peak chart position | | Album |
| Title | Year | SCO | UK Phy. | Album |
|---|---|---|---|---|
| "I Like Presents" | 2020 | 24 | 29 | A Very Poppy Christmas |

== Guest appearances ==
List of non-single guest appearances, with other performing artists
| Title | Year | Other artist(s) | Album |
|---|---|---|---|
| "Fade into You" | 2014 | Tommy Miller | Covers & Mashups - Volume 1 |
| "Breezeblocks" | 2014 | Kurt Hunter, Tony Hundtoft | Covers & Mashups - Volume 1 |
| "Just My Type" | 2020 | We Bare Bears | We Bare Bears (Original Television Soundtrack) |

== Music videos ==
List of music videos, showing year released, other artists featured and directors
| Title | Year | Other artist(s) | Director(s) | Ref. |
As lead artist
| "Lowlife" | 2015 | None | Titanic Sinclair | |
| "Money" | 2016 | None | Titanic Sinclair | |
| "Computer Boy" | 2017 | None | Titanic Sinclair | |
| "Let's Make a Video" | 2017 | None | Titanic Sinclair | |
| "Interweb" | 2017 | None | Titanic Sinclair | |
| "Moshi Moshi" | 2017 | None | Titanic Sinclair | |
| "Bleach Blonde Baby" | 2017 | None | Titanic Sinclair | |
| "Time Is Up" | 2018 | Diplo | Titanic Sinclair | |
| "X" | 2018 | None | Titanic Sinclair | |
| "Voicemail" | 2019 | None | Titanic Sinclair | |
| "Scary Mask" | 2019 | Fever 333 | Titanic Sinclair | |
| "Concrete" | 2019 | None | Titanic Sinclair | |
| "I Disagree" | 2019 | None | Titanic Sinclair | |
| "Bloodmoney" | 2019 | None | Titanic Sinclair | |
| "Fill the Crown" | 2019 | None | Titanic Sinclair | |
| "Anything Like Me" | 2020 | None | Jesse Draxler; Poppy | |
| "Sit/Stay" | 2020 | None | Poppy | |
| "All the Things She Said" | 2020 | None | Poppy | |
| "Her" | 2021 | None | Chris Ullens | |
| "Flux" | 2021 | None | Poppy | |
| "So Mean" | 2021 | None | Poppy | |
| "Dead Flowers" | 2021 | Health | Health | |
| "FYB" | 2022 | None | Poppy; Garrett Nicholson | |
| "Stagger" | 2022 | None | Poppy | |
| "Church Outfit" | 2023 | None | Poppy; Conner Bell | |
| "Spit" | 2023 | None | Jim Louvau; Tony Aguilera | |
| "Knockoff" | 2023 | None | Le3ay Studio | |
| "Motorbike" | 2023 | None | Garrett Nicholson; Poppy | |
| "Hard" | 2023 | None | Garrett Nicholson; Poppy | |
| "Zig" | 2023 | None | Garrett Nicholson; Poppy | |
| "Flicker" | 2023 | None | Le3ay Studio | |
| "V.A.N" | 2024 | Bad Omens | Garrett Nicholson; Poppy | |
| "New Way Out" | 2024 | None | Sam Cannon | |
| "They're All Around Us" | 2024 | None | Sam Cannon | |
| "Crystallized" | 2024 | None | Sam Cannon | |
| "End of You" | 2025 | Amy Lee; Courtney LaPlante | Jensen Noen | |
| "Unravel" | 2025 | None | Sam Cannon | |
| "Bruised Sky" | 2025 | None | Orie McGinness | |
| "Guardian" | 2025 | None | Orie McGinness | |
| "Time Will Tell" | 2026 | None | Orie McGinness | |
| "Dying to Forget" | 2026 | None | Orie McGinness | |
As featured artist
| "Hide and Seek" | 2014 | Eppic | Jimmy Bates; Fifgen Films | |
| "They'll Just Love You" | 2023 | Stu Brooks; Danny Elfman | Dark Details | |
| "Suffocate" | 2024 | Knocked Loose | Eric Richter | |
| "From Me to U" | 2025 | Babymetal | Takuya Oyama | |

== Songwriting credits ==
| Title | Year | Artist(s) | Album |
|---|---|---|---|
| "Won't Change" | 2014 | 501; Protohype; Ras | Crystallize |
| "Down for Whatever" | 2015 | Chelsea Lankes | Non-album single |
| "Misery" | 2021 | Brett Manning | Love Justice |
| "What If I" | 2021 | Brett Manning | Love Justice |
