= 336 (disambiguation) =

336 may refer to:

- The year 336 or the year 336 BC
- The number 336
- The EP by AFI, 336
- 3:36 (Music to Sleep To), a 2016 album by Poppy
- 336 Lacadiera, a main-belt asteroid
