= Negative Spaces =

Studio album by Poppy
- Released: November 15, 2024
- Genre: Metalcore; alternative metal; industrial metal; alternative rock; synth-pop; pop rock
- Length: 42:24
- Label: Sumerian
- Producer: Jordan Fish

Poppy chronology
Zig (2023)	Negative Spaces (2024)	Empty Hands (2026)

Singles from Negative Spaces
- 1. "New Way Out" Released: June 4, 2024; 2. "They're All Around Us" Released: September 17, 2024; 3. "The Cost of Giving Up" / "Crystallized" Released: October 15, 2024

Negative Spaces is the sixth studio album by American singer Poppy. It was released through Sumerian Records on November 15, 2024. Poppy co-wrote all the songs on the album, while its production was handled by former Bring Me the Horizon keyboardist and producer Jordan Fish. Musically, the album is primarily a metalcore, alternative metal, alternative rock, and pop metal album that also features elements of different genres.

== Background ==
On October 27, 2023, Poppy released her fifth studio album, Zig. In several interviews, she hinted at a possible "part two" of Zig, referring to it as Zag. During 2024, she was featured on the Bad Omens single "V.A.N" and the Knocked Loose single "Suffocate", which were both met with positive reactions and reviews. In June, she released a new single titled "New Way Out". In an interview with NME, she confirmed that her new album is "around the corner" and that it would be produced by Jordan Fish. On September 17, she released the second single titled "They're All Around Us". The album and its release date, set for November 15, were announced on September 23. On October 15, two songs, "The Cost of Giving Up" and "Crystallized", were released.

== Composition ==
Musically, the album has been described as metalcore, alternative metal, industrial metal, alternative rock, synth-pop, pop rock, and pop metal, that also delves into hyperpop, industrial, grunge, space rock, emo, pop-punk, arena rock, dream pop, electro-industrial, and electronic rock.

== Critical reception ==
Professional ratings
Aggregate scores
Source	Rating
AnyDecentMusic?	7.4/10
Metacritic	86/100
Review scores
Source	Rating
AllMusic	4/5 stars
The A.V. Club	B+
Clash	8/10
Distorted Sound	9/10
DIY	9/10
The Guardian	4/5 stars
Kerrang!	4/5 stars
The Line of Best Fit	8/10
Metal Hammer	4/5 stars
Sputnikmusic	4.5/5

Negative Spaces received critical acclaim, with critics calling it a return to form for Poppy following the more mixed reactions of Zig. According to the review aggregator Metacritic, Negative Space received "universal acclaim" based on a weighted average score of 86 out of 100 from 7 critic scores. Ryan Ciocco of 411Mania wrote, "Negative Spaces sees Poppy delivering a faithful return to her metal leanings from early this decade but also...synth pop and industrial sounds as well. Her voice will either enchant you, scare you, or manage to somehow do both...while the instrumental performance is really good on this one...Poppy is the focus." Writing for AllMusic, Neil Z. Yeung stated, "Poppy continues to push the boundaries of heavy music and the limits that genre can impose on an artist." Ryan Reed of The A.V. Club called the album "her most cohesive set of tracks to date." Nisrin Jaber of Boolin Tunes reviewed the album before its release. She revealed that it featured raw, poetic lyrics and versatile sound shifts that highlights themes of self-doubt, deferred growth, and a struggle for motivation. Tom Morgan of Clash wrote, "A stylish, impactful and accessible collection, Negative Spaces is music for our post-genre, post-everything digital age. It's a remarkable artefact of this era of music." Shania Richards of Distorted Sound wrote, "This album proves Poppy is more than a metal vocalist, nor is she a mere pop-turned-metal singer; she is gradually evolving into something far greater."

Rishi Shah of DIY called it "A masterpiece, showcasing her ability to meld reliable sound palettes with some audacious new tricks." Dave Simpson of The Guardian stated, "On her sixth album, the multi-genre star seems to be having an identity crisis – but...she clearly trusts her own instincts." Emma Wilkes of Kerrang! felt that the album's producer, Jordan Fish, formerly of Bring Me the Horizon, has an "overwhelming influence on the album's sound" and "crowds out Poppy's own distinctness at times". However, they were still positive stating, "As scattered as it can be, its hit rate remains high and it's never content to just coast." Caitlin Chatterton of The Line of Best Fit called it "a sprawling [and] surprising album that proves a heavier sound looks good on her." Merlin Alderslade of Metal Hammer wrote, "Poppy has decided to hone in and focus her energies on creating a full-on modern metal record, bringing in former Bring Me The Horizon man Jordan Fish on production duties," and called it "one of the catchiest, most consistent records of 2024." Writing for Sputnikmusic, SaiseiTunes called it "Poppy’s most consistent album" and "one of the most enjoyable metalcore records of 2024."

=== Year-end lists ===
Negative Spaces on year-end lists
Publication	Accolade	Year	Rank	Ref.
Kerrang	Top 50 best albums of 2024	2024	6	
Rock Sound	Top 50 albums of 2024	2024	2	
Sputnikmusic	Top 50 albums of 2024	2024	14	
Alternative Press	50 best albums of 2024	2024	Unranked	

== Track listing ==
All tracks are written by Poppy, Jordan Fish, and Stephen Harrison, except where noted; all tracks are produced by Fish.

Negative Spaces track listing
No.	Title	Writer(s)	Length
1.	"Have You Had Enough?"		3:38
2.	"The Cost of Giving Up"		3:17
3.	"They're All Around Us"		3:25
4.	"Yesterday"		0:48
5.	"Crystallized"	Poppy; Fish	3:06
6.	"Vital"		3:20
7.	"Push Go"		3:33
8.	"Nothing"		3:04
9.	"The Center's Falling Out"		2:25
10.	"Hey There"		1:29
11.	"Negative Spaces"		2:55
12.	"Surviving on Defiance"	Poppy; Fish; Julian Gargiulo	3:28
13.	"New Way Out"		3:23
14.	"Tomorrow"		0:52
15.	"Halo"	Poppy; Fish	3:41
Total length:			42:24

Notes

- All track titles are stylized in lowercase.

== Personnel ==
- Poppy – vocals, layout
- Jordan Fish – production
- Zakk Cervini – mixing, mastering
- Ralph Alexander Granter – drums on all tracks except "Yesterday", "Hey There", "New Way Out", and "Tomorrow"
- Stephen Harrison – guitar, production assistance
- Julian Gargiulo – mixing assistance, engineering assistance
- Sam Cannon – photography
- Eddie Kepner – layout

== Charts ==
Chart performance for Negative Spaces
Chart (2024)	Peak position
UK Albums Sales (OCC)	94
UK Rock & Metal Albums (OCC)	10
US Heatseekers Albums (Billboard)	4
US Top Album Sales (Billboard)	46
US Top Hard Rock Albums (Billboard)	23

== Release history ==
Release dates and formats for Negative Spaces
Region	Date	Format	Label	Ref.
Various	November 15, 2024	CD; digital download; LP; streaming	Sumerian	
Various	December 30, 2024	Cassette	Sumerian	
