= Empty Hands =

Empty Hands may refer to:

- Empty Hands (album), 2026 album by Poppy
  - "Empty Hands" (song), the title track
- Empty Hands (film), 1924 American film
- "Empty Hands" (Spartacus), an episode of Spartacus: Vengeance

== See also ==
- Hand-to-hand combat
- Karate
