= Empty Hands (album) =

Studio album by Poppy
- Released: January 23, 2026
- Studios: MDDN (Los Angeles, California)
- Genres: Metalcore; alternative metal; industrial metal
- Length: 38:31
- Label: Sumerian
- Producer: Jordan Fish

Poppy chronology
Negative Spaces (2024)	Empty Hands (2026)

Singles from Empty Hands
- 1. "Unravel" Released: October 23, 2025; 2. "Bruised Sky" Released: November 12, 2025; 3. "Guardian" Released: December 4, 2025; 4. "Time Will Tell" Released: January 23, 2026; 5. "Dying to Forget" Released: June 17, 2026

Empty Hands is the seventh studio album by American singer Poppy. It was released through Sumerian Records on January 23, 2026. The album's lyrics were written solely by Poppy, while production was handled by Jordan Fish, who also produced her previous album Negative Spaces (2024).

Empty Hands received acclaim from music critics, who praised its production and Poppy's vocal performance, but some criticism aimed at its inconsistency. It debuted at number 137 on the US Billboard 200 becoming her second entry on the chart since her third album, I Disagree (2020). It also entered the charts in several countries including Australia and the UK, and becoming her first album to do so in Austria, Belgium, France, Germany, and Switzerland.

== Background ==
Poppy released her sixth studio album Negative Spaces in November 2024, which was critically acclaimed, and also marked her first collaboration with British producer Jordan Fish. She embarked on the They're All Around Us Tour in support of the record. On September 2, 2025, Poppy premiered the then-unreleased song "Bruised Sky" at her concert in Worcester, Massachusetts. The same month, she collaborated with Courtney LaPlante of Spiritbox and Amy Lee of Evanescence on the single "End of You", and was previously featured on Babymetal's single "From Me to U" earlier that year.

On October 23, 2025, Poppy announced the Constantly Nowhere Tour and released "Unravel" as the album's lead single. The tour commenced in Brisbane, Australia on January 20, 2026. On November 12, 2025, Poppy announced Empty Hands, along with the release of its second single, "Bruised Sky". On December 4, the third single, "Guardian", was released. On January 23, "Time Will Tell" was released along with album as the fourth single. On June 17, 2026, Poppy released a music video for the song "Dying to Forget", featuring Isaac Hale of Knocked Loose and Stephen Harrison of House of Protection.

== Composition ==
Empty Hands has been primarily described as metalcore, alternative metal, industrial metal, and nu metal. In a press release announcing the album, Empty Hands was said to feature elements of industrial music and pop sensibilities, with "moments that call back to Poppy's surrealist roots with her signature uncanny, machine-like voice". Critics have noted elements of speed metal, deathcore, punk rock, synth-pop, electronic rock, alternative rock, grunge, stoner metal, black metal, and djent. All of the album's songs are co-written by Poppy and Fish, with additional contributions made by House of Protection guitarist Stephen Harrison and Julian Gargiulo.

== Critical reception ==
Professional ratings
Aggregate scores
Source	Rating
Metacritic	81/100
Review scores
Source	Rating
AllMusic	4.5/5 stars
Blabbermouth.net	8.5/10
Clash	7/10
DIY	4.5/5 stars
Kerrang!	4/5
New Noise Magazine	5/5 stars
Pitchfork	7.0/10
Spectrum Culture	3/5 stars
Sputnikmusic	2.7/5
Stereoboard	3/5 stars

According to the review aggregator Metacritic, Empty Hands received "universal acclaim" based on a weighted average score of 81 out of 100 from 6 critic scores. Neil Z. Yeung of AllMusic wrote, "As a culmination of everything she's been building toward in the years since I Disagree, Empty Hands is a towering success, priming Poppy for the arena big leagues with her twisted and wildly engrossing style." Anne Rickson of Blabbermouth wrote, "'Empty Hands' sounds like Poppy doing exactly what she wants, without overthinking it. When she's fired up and emotionally invested, her music hits on another level, and this album captures that energy from start to finish." Joe Edwards of Boolin Tunes wrote, "[the album is] missing that key element that has always made Poppy an act worth following – experimentation, and dabbling in new sounds." Shannon Garner of Clash noted on the continued "evolution" of Poppy's musical style and the "confrontational" tone of the album. Sarah Jamieson of DIY wrote, "Empty Hands feels defiant in its ambition but never disingenuous or forced." Emily Wilkes of Kerrang! called it "her most chameleonic, creative body of work to date." Ixora Cook of New Noise Magazine complemented the albums' lyrical themes of romantic grief, loss, and betrayal by stating, "the lyrics are...filled with some of the most vitriolic things I've ever heard Poppy say, [and] they're some of the most vivid, specific feelings we've ever heard her extrapolate upon."

Roman Kamshin of Showbiz by PS wrote, "Empty Hands isn’t a bad album; it’s just far too safe for an artist as multifaceted as Poppy." Trevor Zaple of Spectrum Culture praised Poppy's vocal performance, but felt that "her own concepts take a backseat to shiny radio metal necessities." Ryan P of Sputnikmusic wrote that Poppy's "vocal chops are really up to par, both harsh and clean," but also noted that the album is "sidetracked by...unimaginative industrial/electronic bits...[and falls] into the trap that plagues a lot of modern, accessible metal." Will Marshall of Stereoboard wrote, "For all the fun to be had with ‘Empty Hands’ it simply doesn’t feel as experimental...as Poppy can be." Georgia Haskins, writing for Wall of Sound, called it "her most assertive and self-assured work to date."

== Track listing ==
All lyrics are written by Poppy; all music is composed by Poppy and Jordan Fish, with additional co-writers where noted.

Empty Hands track listing
No.	Title	Music	Length
1.	"Public Domain"		4:00
2.	"Bruised Sky"	Stephen Harrison	3:41
3.	"Guardian"	Harrison; Julian Gargiulo	3:14
4.	"Constantly Nowhere"		0:28
5.	"Unravel"		2:55
6.	"Dying to Forget"	Gargiulo; Harrison; Isaac Hale	3:33
7.	"Time Will Tell"		3:27
8.	"Eat the Hate"	Harrison	1:50
9.	"The Wait"		3:46
10.	"If We're Following the Light"	Gargiulo; Harrison	4:06
11.	"Blink"		0:44
12.	"Ribs"	Gargiulo	3:39
13.	"Empty Hands"	Harrison	3:09
Total length:			38:31

== Personnel ==
Credits adapted from the album's liner notes.

- Poppy – vocals, art layout
- Ralph Alexander – drums (tracks 1–3, 5–10, 12, 13)
- Zakk Cervini – mixing, mastering
- Jordan Fish – production (all tracks), guitar & keyboards (1–3, 5–10, 12, 13)
- Julian Gargiulo – mixing, mastering (all tracks); additional guitar (6, 10, 12), additional bass (6)
- Isaac Hale – guitar (6)
- Stephen Harrison – guitar (6, 13)
- Johnuel Hasney – additional guitar (1–3, 5–7, 10, 13), additional bass (1–3, 5–10, 12, 13)
- Hector Clark – photography
- Eddie Kepner – CD layout
- Davis Rider – art layout

== Charts ==
Chart performance for Empty Hands
Chart (2026)	Peak position
Australian Albums (ARIA)	7
Austrian Albums (Ö3 Austria)	19
Belgian Albums (Ultratop Flanders)	144
Belgian Albums (Ultratop Wallonia)	78
French Albums (SNEP)	194
French Rock & Metal Albums (SNEP)	8
German Albums (Offizielle Top 100)	22
German Rock & Metal Albums (Offizielle Top 100)	8
Scottish Albums (Official Charts)	15
Spanish Vinyl Albums (PROMUSICAE)	70
Swiss Albums (Schweizer Hitparade)	50
UK Albums (Official Charts)	82
UK Independent Albums (Official Charts)	6
UK Rock & Metal Albums (Official Charts)	2
US Billboard 200	137
US Independent Albums (Billboard)	23
US Top Rock & Alternative Albums (Billboard)	30

== Release history ==
Release dates and formats for Empty Hands
Region	Date	Format	Label	Ref.
Various	January 23, 2026	CD; digital download; LP; streaming	Sumerian	
