= Improbably Poppy =

2024 American web series

- Official logo
- Genre: Variety; Surreal comedy
- Created by: Veeps
- Story by: Poppy
- Directed by: Garret Nicholson
- Starring: Poppy
- Country of origin: United States
- Original language: English
- No. of seasons: 1
- No. of episodes: 6

Production
- Executive producers: Benji Madden; Joel Madden; Kyle Heller; Bobby Gomes; Joey Simmrin
- Producers: Garret Nicholson; Mike Holland; Michael Newman; Josh Kay; Amelia Marino
- Animator: Christopher Rutledge
- Editors: Spencer Goldman; Ben Ball
- Running time: 13-14 minutes
- Production company: Veeps Studio

Original release
- Network: Veeps
- Release: October 18, 2024

Related
- I'm Poppy

Improbably Poppy is a six-episode web series starring American singer Poppy. It premiered exclusively on the streaming platform Veeps on October 11, 2024, and on February 6, 2025, the first episode was made public on YouTube, followed by two more (as of March 3, 2025).

== Background and plot ==
The series was officially announced in October 2024, with Poppy describing it as a variety show that blends dark and satirical humor. It features Poppy teaching the audience "lessons" in each episode, accompanied by three puppets and her crew. The show includes guest interviews that "border on brutal" and explores various themes through a surreal lens.

== Controversy ==
In the first episode of the show, Poppy portrays a fortune teller who humorously tells a man, "Grimes is going to ask you to be a surrogate to her child. Say yes. But don't go to the appointment. If you let her sing anything from her major-label releases to you, it's too late."

Grimes later responded to that part, saying: "Poppy is talented and doesn't need to lower herself to dredging up ancient drama to get people to listen to her music. I don't understand these continued attempts to goad me into a public fight, all because I did not want to put out a song with her abusive boyfriend Titanic Sinclair (which they leaked anyway)." She further expressed a desire to move past the conflict, adding: "I wish her the best and I hope one day she grows up and realizes that I've tried to be a girls girl here. I will not fight back, I won't pursue legal action, I will not get into the details. This is an entirely one sided situation."

The feud between Poppy and Grimes dates back to their 2018 collaboration on the song "Play Destroy". Following its release, Poppy accused Grimes of bullying during the production process. Grimes responded by advising Poppy to "let it go" indicating a desire to move beyond the dispute. Although the singer later reignited the feud on Twitter, and Poppy responded with "Are we still doing this? Lol. 5 years triggered."

== Cast ==
Actors that were featured on Improbably Poppy:

- Poppy as Herself
- Amelia Marino as Nurse / Dave Matthews (Band Incident Survivor) / Demented Clown / Contestant's Step-sister
- Sean Cabuzzi as Caveman / Grip
- Joel Haver as Fractions Co-host
- Anne Brothers as Hospital Administrator / Intern
- Torston Odland as Game Show Contestant / Shady Guy
- Rob Nelson as Armed Santa #2 / Criminal #2
- Rumsha Hassan as Chamber Contestant #1
- Blake Christian as Chamber Contestant #2
- Daved Olivencia as Chamber Contestant #3
- Sam Vita as Archduke Franz Ferdinand
- Robert Bennett as Focus Puller
- Zach Ehlrich as Union Rep
- Blake Rosier as Magician #1

== Episodes ==
All episode information is taken from Veeps:

No. overall	No. in season	Title
1	1	"Taking Risk"
In the premiere episode, Poppy takes to the streets, offering disturbing fortunes and casually unraveling senses of reality. And a chance encounter with Franz Ferdinand—the Archduke, not the band—warps the fabric of time. It's all a lesson on the importance of taking risks, even if it means breaking the universe—because, honestly, does anything really matter?
2	2	"Education"
Poppy explores the simple math of fractions until her guest’s perception of reality begins to shatter. A lesson in how to be a grip from her crew leads to Poppy getting her union card. And when competing magicians show up to perform for Poppy, their rivalry escalates to existential dread. School is in session with a lesson in education from Professor Poppy.
3	3	"Free Will"
Poppy begins to suspect that her actions—no matter how whimsical or bizarre—might actually have consequences. Enter a scientist and a theologist, who attempt to explain “Chaos Theory,” “The Butterfly Effect,” and free will to Poppy, while she stares blankly at them as if processing the futility of existence. Inspired, Poppy decides to gift her beloved plant friends with free will.
4	4	"Hygiene"
Poppy grows disgusted with her puppet friends after discovering their disturbing hygiene habits. Meanwhile, a contestant on “Is It Cake?” gets a surprise ingredient. Poppy gifts Zwink a spa day to teach him about self-care. And Detective Poppy makes her noir-inspired debut, attempting to crack the case of who started a nasty rumor about dear Mr. Scib.
5	5	"Growing Up"
Poppy takes the puppets on a disturbingly enlightening journey through the nightmare known as "growing up." Meanwhile, Poppy surprises one lucky viewer with a seemingly harmless gift, pizza, leaving the recipient deeply unnerved. And a long-forgotten educational video on “second puberty” resurfaces, revealing the grim truth: there’s always another round of awkward changes, physical discomfort, and identity crises waiting just around the corner.
6	6	"Nature"
In this unsettlingly whimsical finale, Poppy invites a basil plant onto the show for a deep dive into the natural sciences. Then, Poppy heads to the LA Zoo to see the “exhibits” where her detached commentary turns the visit into a dark metaphor about captivity, futility, and the thin line between observer and observed. And Poppy gives a season ending performance taking us all into the wilderness.
