= New Way Out =

Single by Poppy

from the album Negative Spaces
- Released: June 4, 2024
- Genre: Industrial pop; pop metal; electronic rock; nu metal; hard rock
- Length: 3:22
- Label: Sumerian
- Songwriters: Moriah Pereira; Jordan Fish; Stephen Harrison
- Producer: Jordan Fish

Poppy singles chronology
"Suffocate" (2024)	"New Way Out" (2024)	"They're All Around Us" (2024)

Music video
- "New Way Out" on YouTube

"New Way Out" is a song by American singer Poppy. It was released by Sumerian Records on June 4, 2024, as the lead single from her sixth studio album, Negative Spaces. The song was written by Poppy, Stephen Harrison and its producer Jordan Fish.

== Background ==
Following the release of her fifth studio album, Zig (2023), Poppy collaborated with the American bands Bad Omens and Knocked Loose on the two successful singles "V.A.N" and "Suffocate" respectively in 2024. Shortly after, she revealed the cover art to a new solo single on her Instagram account. It was later announced one day before its release. The song was co-written by Stephan Harrison, the former member of the American rock band Fever 333, who previously collaborated with Poppy on her 2019 single "Scary Mask" from her second extended play, Choke, and was produced by Bring Me the Horizon's former member Jordan Fish.

The song's visualizer was directed by Sam Cannon, and it has been compared by Hesher Keenan of MetalSucks to Alice in Wonderland due to the way Poppy was dressed, and the keyhole aesthetic.

== Composition ==
"New Way Out" is an industrial pop, pop metal, electronic rock, nu metal, and hard rock song that talks about self-growth and pulling oneself back from the edge. It has been influenced by Madonna and Britney Spears.

== Commercial performance ==
"New Way Out" premiered on BBC Radio 1 when it was released. The song debuted at number 17 on the Mainstream Rock chart. It became her second song to enter the Mainstream Rock Airplay chart after "V.A.N", which peaked at number nine.

== In popular culture ==
The song was used as the main theme for WWE's Elimination Chamber event in 2025. It was also included on the Horizon XS radio station from the 2026 video game Forza Horizon 6.

== Charts ==
=== Weekly charts ===
Chart performance for "New Way Out"
Chart (2024)	Peak position
US Hot Hard Rock Songs (Billboard)	16
US Mainstream Rock (Billboard)	9

=== Year-end charts ===
Year-end chart performance for "New Way Out"
Chart (2025)	Position
US Mainstream Rock (Billboard)	41
