= End of You (song) =

Single by Poppy, Amy Lee and Courtney LaPlante
- Released: September 4, 2025
- Recorded: 2025
- Genre: Arena rock; metalcore; hard rock; pop rock; symphonic metal
- Length: 3:13
- Label: Sumerian
- Songwriters: Moriah Rose Pereira; Jordan Fish; Amy Lee; Courtney LaPlante; Mike Stringer
- Producer: Jordan Fish

Poppy singles chronology
"From Me to U" (2025)	"End of You" (2025)	"Unravel" (2025)

Amy Lee singles chronology
"Hand That Feeds" (2025)	"End of You" (2025)

Courtney LaPlante singles chronology
"My Queen" (2025)	"End of You" (2025)	"Ties That Blind" (2025)

Music video
- "End of You" on YouTube

"End of You" is a song by American singers Poppy, Amy Lee, and Courtney LaPlante. It was released on September 4, 2025, through Sumerian Records. In February 2026, it topped the Billboard Mainstream Rock Airplay chart, making history as the first time the chart was led by a collaboration of three female artists, while earning Poppy and LaPlante their first number-one singles on the chart, alongside the first solo number-one for Lee. In November 2026, the song was nominated for Best Metal Performance at the 69th Annual Grammy Awards.

== Background and release ==
On August 26, 2025, Poppy, Lee, and LaPlante all shared a group photo, which would later become the single's cover art, to their respective social media accounts. On August 28, the trio then released teaser videos to their accounts, captioned "End of You", with vocals from Lee. The single was then released on September 4.

In an interview with NME, Poppy stated that the idea for a "dark Moulin Rouge" inspired collaboration started when she and Jordan Fish were working on her 2024 album, Negative Spaces. Fish suggested the idea to Lee whilst working together on "Hand That Feeds" and also suggested the inclusion of LaPlante. Poppy and Lee both described the themes of the song as of strength, unity and women empowerment, with Lee adding that "it's about taking on the patriarchy".

== Live performances ==
On September 13, 2026, the song debuted live at The O2, London during Evanescence's Sanctuary Tour supported by Poppy, with LaPlante making an appearance for the song.

== Composition ==
"End of You" has been variously described as hard rock, metalcore, arena rock, and hardcore, with industrial elements.

== Accolades ==
Awards and nominations for "End of You"
Year	Award ceremony	Category	Result	Ref.
2025	Nik Nocturnal Awards	Collab Song of the Year	Won	
2025	Revolver Magazine	Song of the Year	Won	
2027	69th Annual Grammy Awards	Best Metal Performance	Pending	

== Personnel ==
Credits adapted from Tidal.

- Poppy – vocals, writer
- Amy Lee – vocals, writer
- Courtney LaPlante – vocals, writer
- Jordan Fish – producer, writer
- Mike Stringer – guitar, writer
- Zakk Cervini – mixing engineer, mastering engineer
- Julian Gargiulo – assistant mixing engineer, assistant mastering engineer
- Josh Gilbert – recording engineer

== Charts ==
Chart performance for "End of You"
Chart (2025)	Peak position
New Zealand (Recorded Music NZ)	13
UK Singles (Official Charts)	93
UK Independent (Official Charts)	31
UK Rock & Metal (Official Charts)	14
US Bubbling Under Hot 100 (Billboard)	25
US Digital Song Sales (Billboard)	5
US Hot Rock & Alternative Songs (Billboard)	18
US Mainstream Rock Airplay (Billboard)	1
US Rock & Alternative Airplay (Billboard)	29
