= Poppy (singer) =

American singer and songwriter (born 1995)

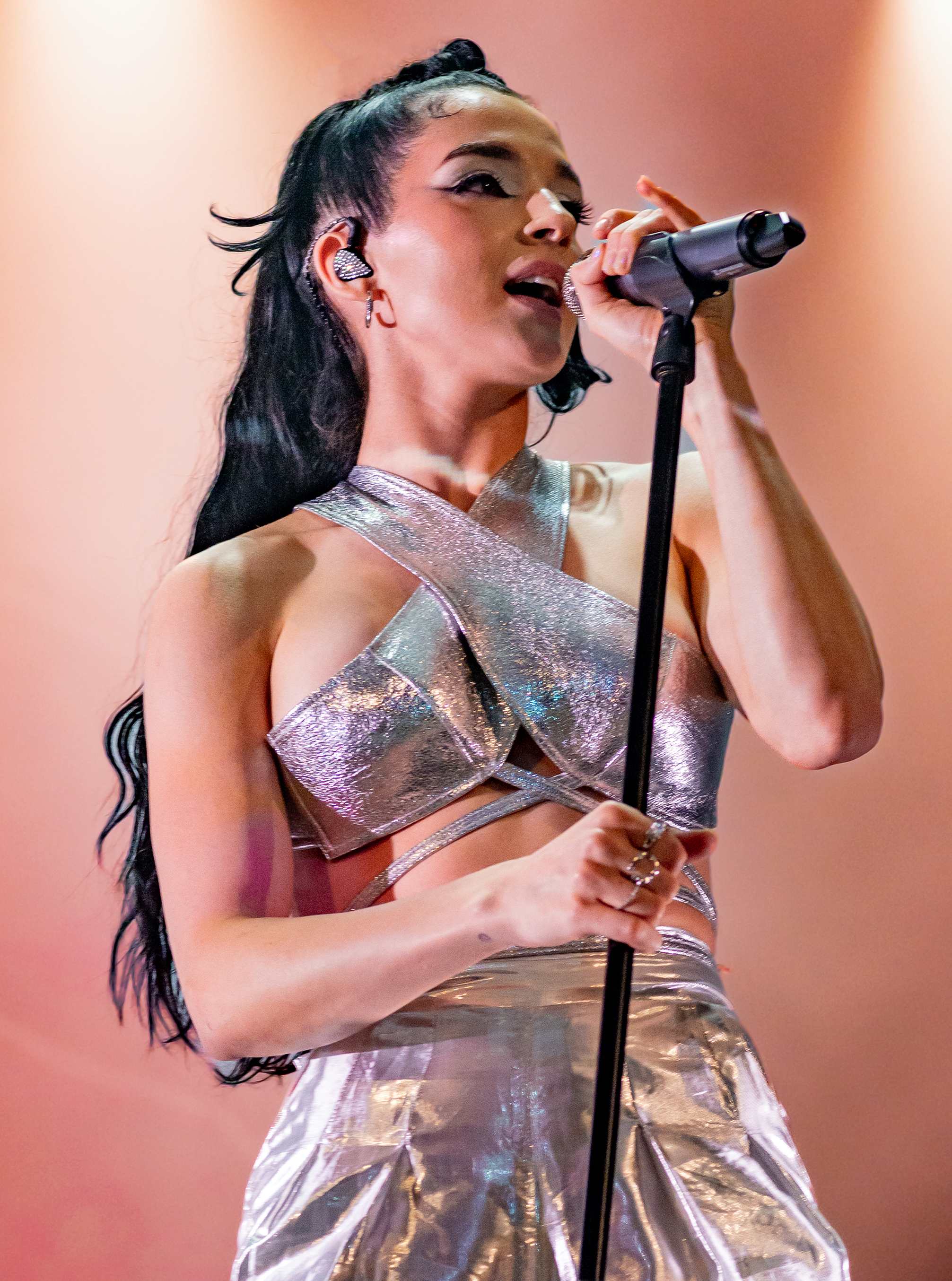
- Poppy performing in 2023
- Born: Moriah Rose Pereira; January 1, 1995 (age 31); Boston, Massachusetts, U.S.
- Occupations: Singer; songwriter; musician; YouTuber
- Years active: 2011–present
- Musical career
- Also known as: That Poppy
- Origin: Los Angeles, California, U.S.
- Genres: Pop; heavy metal; rock; electronic; industrial
- Instruments: Vocals; guitar
- Works: Discography
- Labels: Mad Decent; Island; I'm Poppy; Sumerian; Republic; Lava

YouTube information
- Channel: Poppy
- Years active: 2011–present
- Genres: Entertainment; satire; pop culture; music
- Subscribers: 3.15 million
- Views: 781.1 million
- Last updated: November 11, 2026
- Website: impoppy.com

Moriah Rose Pereira (born January 1, 1995), known professionally as Poppy (formerly as That Poppy), is an American singer, songwriter, musician, and YouTuber. She earned recognition for her performance art videos on YouTube beginning in 2014, in which she played an uncanny valley-like android satirizing Internet culture and modern society. She collaborated with Titanic Sinclair during this period, and ended the partnership in 2019 after accusing him of emotional abuse. She launched the web series Improbably Poppy in 2024. She is known for her experimentation and versatility within her artistry, public image, and music.

Poppy's first two albums, which mostly featured pop influences, sold moderately. She achieved mainstream success after shifting to heavy metal and industrial rock with her third album, I Disagree (2020), which became her first entry on the Billboard 200. Its single "Bloodmoney" was nominated for the Grammy Award for Best Metal Performance, making Poppy the first solo female artist to be nominated in the category. After an experimental period, she experienced a critical resurgence with her sixth album, Negative Spaces (2024). Also in 2024, she featured on Bad Omens's "V.A.N" and Knocked Loose's "Suffocate", with the latter earning her a second nomination for the Grammy for Best Metal Performance. Her seventh album, Empty Hands (2026), became her second entry on the Billboard 200.

== Early life ==
Moriah Rose Pereira was born in Boston on January 1, 1995. She moved with her family to Nashville at age 14. She recalls wanting to be a Rockette as a child, and took dance lessons for 11 years until deciding to be a musician. She was bullied at school for being skinny and quiet, leading her to complete the latter half of her studies via homeschooling. In 2013, at the age of 18, she moved to Los Angeles.

== Career ==
=== 2011–2013: Early career ===
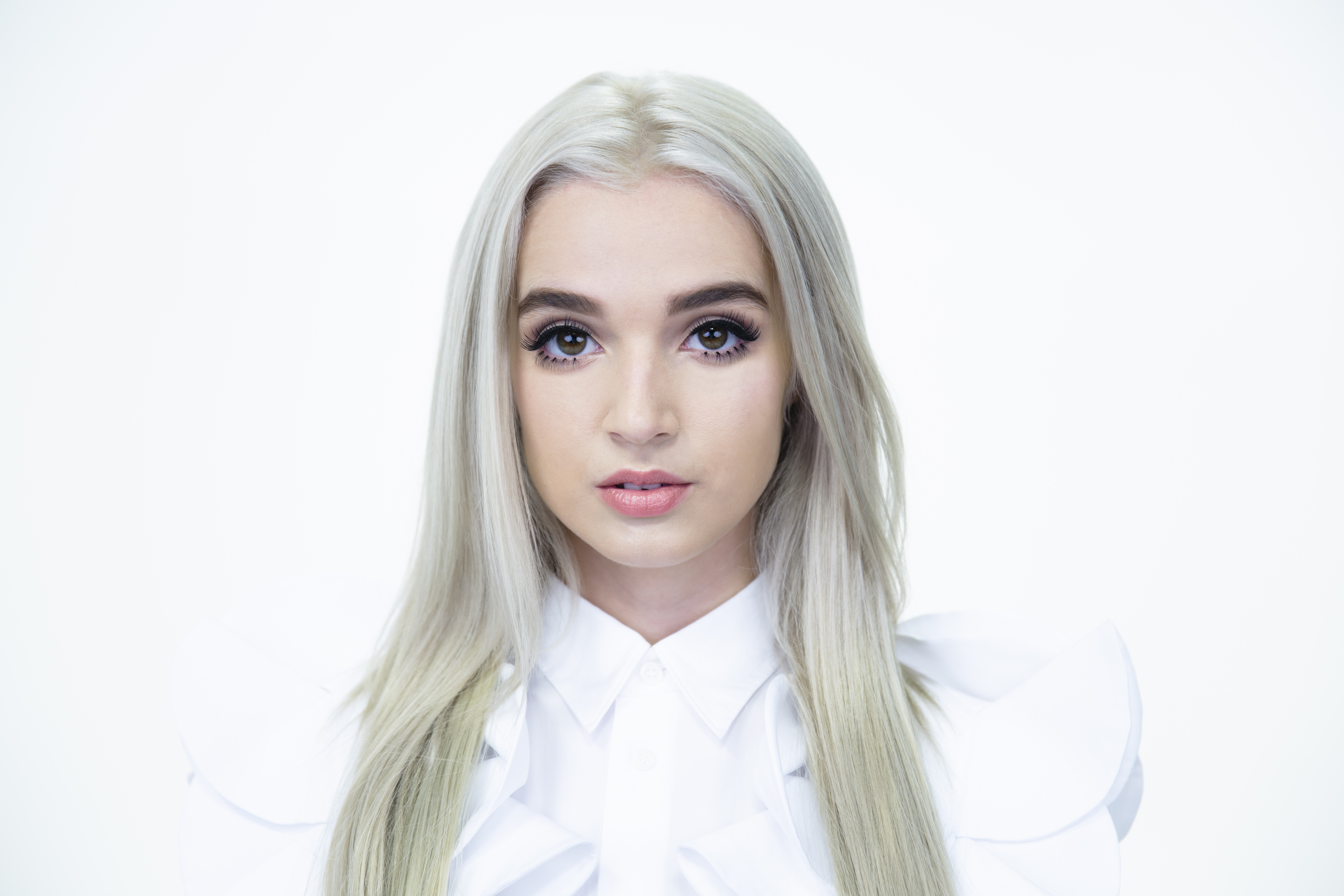
Poppy in front of a pure white background, characteristic of her YouTube videos

Poppy had her first performance at IndieCove in August 2011, covering an Alanis Morissette song. Her YouTube channel was created in October 2011, under the name ThatPoppyTV, alongside another channel, Moriah Poppy, where she posted covers and vlogs. However, all these videos were mostly made private and some others deleted, and the second channel was deleted in 2014. She performed at social media festivals, including VidCon in June 2012 and DigiTour in June 2013. She was featured on Eppic's song "Hide and Seek" in 2013, and moved to Los Angeles to pursue her music career. There, she teamed up with director Titanic Sinclair to make a series of abstract promotional videos on YouTube.

Her first YouTube skit, called Poppy Eats Cotton Candy, was uploaded in November 2014. The videos were described by Sinclair as "a combination of Andy Warhol's pop accessibility, David Lynch's creepiness, and Tim Burton's zany comedic tone". Sinclair also alluded in an interview that Poppy's character in the promotional videos presented itself to him as an android and how some of the concept relates to the uncanny valley hypothesis. Poppy has stated that her YouTube videos tell a story. Her fictional friend Charlotte, a celebrity-interviewing mannequin with a synthetic voice, was a recurring character. She usually appears interacting with Poppy but also on her own. She appears to have developed a drug and jealousy problem after Poppy became famous, which strains their relationship.

Poppy starred in an episode in which she reacts to children reacting to her videos. She has also appeared in an episode of the web series Good Mythical Morning.

=== 2014–2018: Poppy.Computer and Am I a Girl? ===
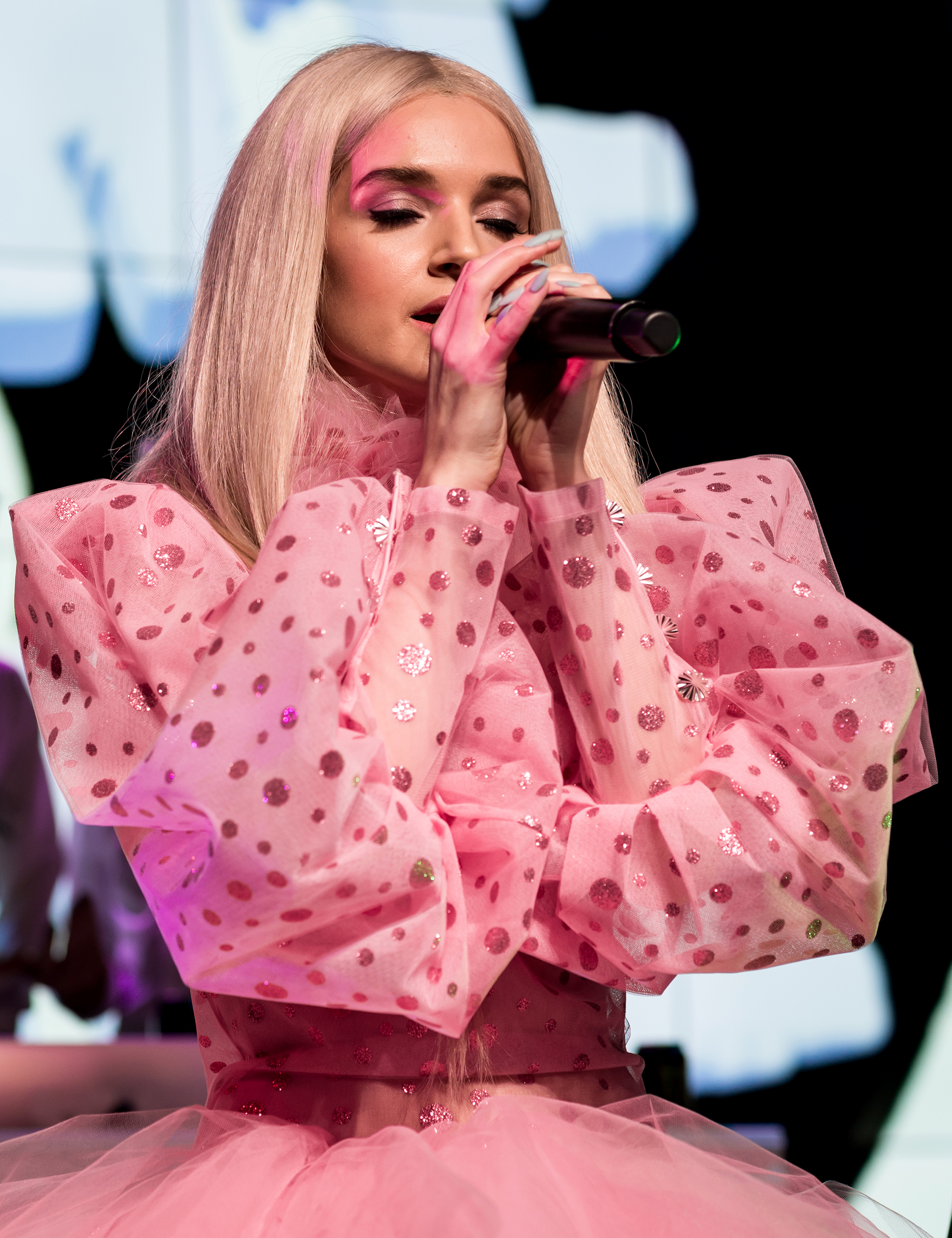
During the Poppy.Computer Tour in October 2017

In 2014, she signed with Island Records to start a music career under the name That Poppy. On June 23, 2015, That Poppy released her first single, "Everybody Wants to Be Poppy". The song was most likely recorded for a debut album that she had announced and described as a dance-pop and punk record. The album was eventually scrapped, and she released her debut extended play (EP), Bubblebath (2016), instead. It was preceded by the 2015 single "Lowlife". She performed at the Corona Capital Festival in November 2015. From July to August 2016, she released a series of advertisements for the shoe company Steve Madden on her channel as a part of its Steve Madden Music program.

In October 2016, Poppy released an ambient music album called 3:36 (Music to Sleep To), composed by Titanic Sinclair and herself, with assistance from polysomnographists from the Washington University School of Medicine. The following month, she became the face of Japanese retailer Sanrio's first "Hello Sanrio" collection.

In February 2017, Poppy starred in a series of videos for Comedy Central called "Internet Famous with Poppy". That September, she received the Breakthrough Artist of the Year award from the Streamys. Poppy's debut studio album, Poppy.Computer, was released in October 2017 by Mad Decent. Its second single, "Computer Boy", was released in May and received the Song of the Year nomination at the Unicorn Awards. "Let's Make a Video" was released as the third single in June, alongside a VHS-grainy music video. The third single, "Interweb", was released in July and performed live on The Late Late Show with James Corden. In November, Poppy announced that her second album was "almost ready" and that she was going to Japan again to finish it. Her first concert tour, the Poppy.Computer Tour, started on October 19, 2017, in Vancouver.

Poppy made her YouTube Rewind debut in 2017 and was one of the few content creators to get her own lines. In April 2017, she began selling a book on her website called The Gospel of Poppy, described as "a book of wisdom". In March 2018, Poppy performed "Moshi Moshi" at the Japanese pop music festival Popspring.

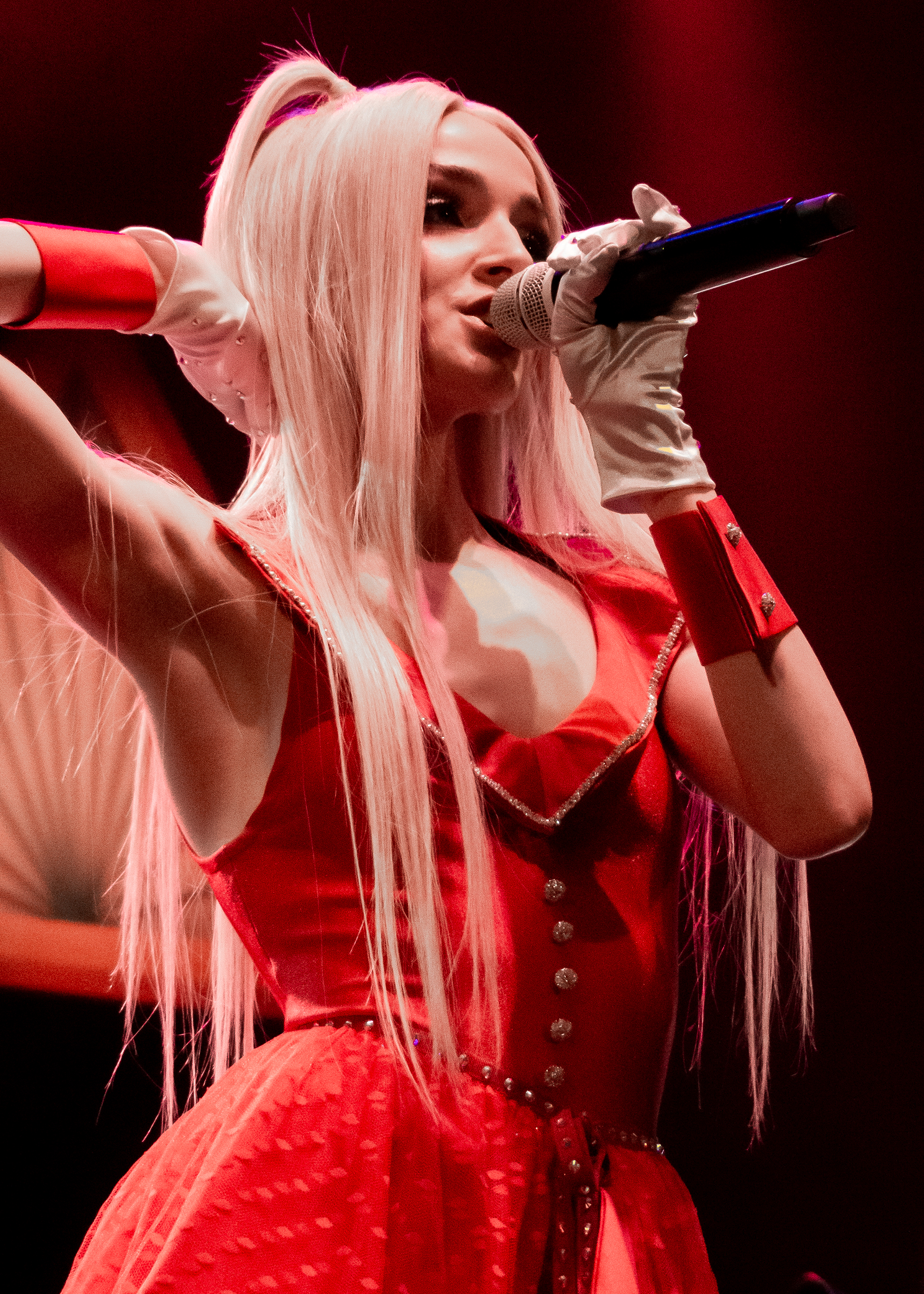
Poppy performing in 2018

On April 17, 2018, Sinclair's former partner Mars Argo filed a 44-page lawsuit in Central California court against Sinclair and Poppy alleging copyright infringement, stating that Sinclair based Poppy's online persona on theirs, as well as emotional and physical abuse Sinclair had allegedly subjected them to in the period after their separation and the subsequent abandonment of the project. On May 7, Poppy made a public statement about the "frivolous" lawsuit, saying Argo was attempting to manipulate her psychologically. She called the suit a "publicity campaign" and a "desperate grab for fame". The Sinclair case was settled out of court on September 14 "with no money exchanging hands". The copyright case against Poppy was dismissed.

In July 2018, Poppy released a cover of Gary Numan's song "Metal" as a single on all digital platforms. Poppy's second studio album, Am I a Girl?, was released on October 31, 2018. Her gender questioning was one of the main themes behind the album, and in a 2019 interview, she stated that she identified as a woman and that she believes "everyone should be able to identify with whatever they choose". The album's lead single, "In a Minute", was released in July. The second single, "Time Is Up", featured American DJ Diplo and was released in August. Each week of October, she released three more singles from the album: "Fashion After All", "Hard Feelings", and "X". The album also featured the song "Play Destroy", a collaboration with Canadian singer Grimes. She later accused Grimes of bullying during the production process.

At the end of the year, Poppy began to drop hints about a new project and website called Poppy.Church, which is no longer active. She attended the 2018 American Music Awards and returned to the Streamy Awards as a presenter. Her cover of "Metal" was featured in the video game WWE 2K20.

=== 2019–2020: Breakthrough with I Disagree and reinvention ===
On January 8, 2019, Poppy announced a graphic novel through Z2 Comics titled Genesis 1, which was released to comic book stores on July 10. The graphic novel tells the origin of Poppy. It was co-written by Poppy, Sinclair, and Ryan Cady, with art by Masa Minoura and Ian McGinty. She elaborated in an interview with Gigwise that the album released with the graphic novel, titled I C U: Music to Read To, is an ambient music album meant to be listened to while reading. On January 23, 2019, Billboard announced Poppy would star in the augmented-reality experience A Jester's Tale, created and directed by Asad J. Malik. It was produced by RYOT and 1RIC, and premiered at the Sundance Film Festival as part of the New Frontier program. The storyline "transports viewers inside a child's bedroom to meet a cast of character holograms". The same month, she released a song titled "Voicemail".

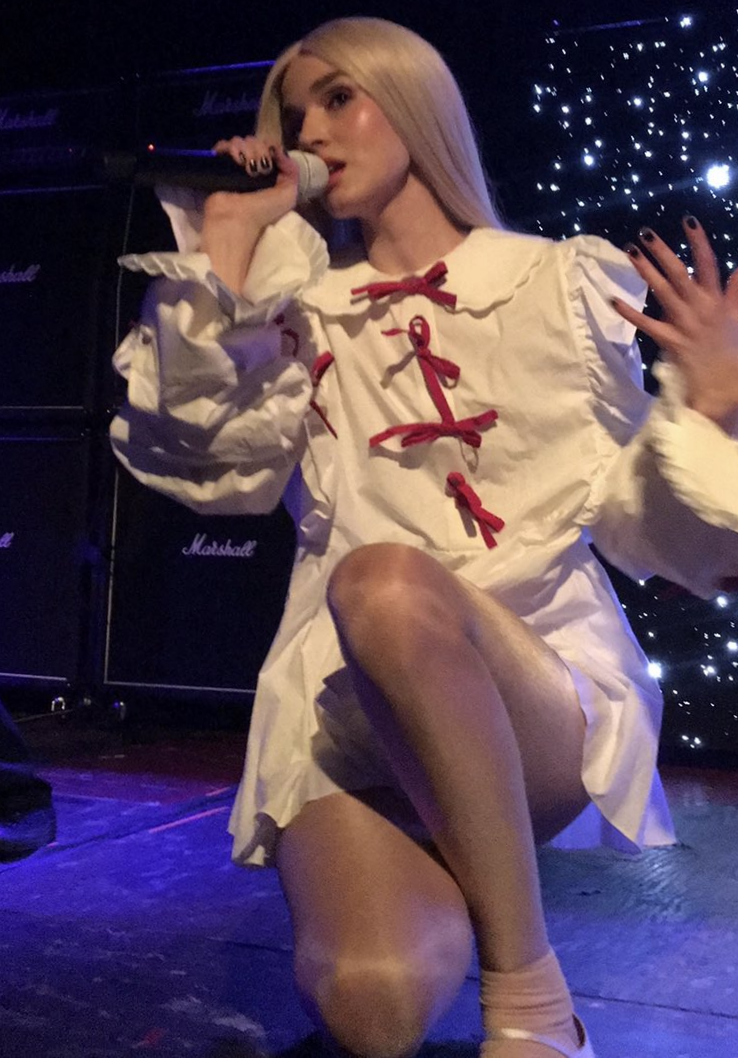
Poppy performing in 2019

After attending the iHeartRadio Music Awards in 2016, she returned in 2019 wearing a dress designed by Viktor & Rolf, and sat front row at their fashion show. Poppy revealed plans for a horror movie and her own music streaming service. She attended the Billboard Music Awards. Her song "Scary Mask" was released in May and featured American rock band Fever 333. The song was included on her second EP, Choke, which was released on June 28, 2019.

In August 2019, Poppy signed with Sumerian Records and released her first single with them, "Concrete", which served as the lead single from her third album. The second single, "I Disagree", followed in October alongside the album preorder, and it was also revealed to be the album's title track. In November, "Bloodmoney" served as the third single from I Disagree, which later earned a Grammy nomination for Best Metal Performance, making her the first solo female artist to be nominated in the category. "Fill the Crown" was released as the fourth single in December. A statement confirming that Poppy and Sinclair parted ways was released in December 2019. She accused him of glamorizing suicide and using this to manipulate her. Poppy stated that Sinclair, while on tour, had attempted to coerce her by threatening to hang himself with an item of hers. She stated that he "lives an illusion that he is a gift to this earth". Responding to the fan speculations that some of her videos were "secret cries for help", Poppy noted that while it was not intentional, the videos projected a facet of reality and "people online sensed it a lot sooner than [she] did". Regarding Mars Argo's allegations against Sinclair, Poppy stated, "I was never 'an accomplice' to [Sinclair's] past actions like some believe—I was a person who suffered similar wrongdoings as [Argo] brought to light."

Poppy's third studio album, I Disagree, was released on January 10, 2020. It peaked at number 130 on the Billboard 200, marking Poppy's first entry on the chart. An official music video for "Anything Like Me" was released alongside the album. On January 28, 2020, Poppy announced her second graphic novel, Poppy's Inferno, which was illustrated by Zoe Thorogood and Amilcar Pinna, and co-written by Ryan Cady. After numerous delays due to the COVID-19 pandemic, it was published on October 20 alongside a soundtrack album, Music to Scream To. In March, a music video for "Sit / Stay" was released, her first music to be self-directed. In June, she released a cover of the 2002 t.A.T.u. single, "All the Things She Said". In July, "Khaos x4" was released as the album's final single, and the deluxe version of Poppy's third album, titled I Disagree (more), followed on August 14, 2020.

Poppy released a four-song Christmas EP, A Very Poppy Christmas, on December 1, 2020. Throughout the year, she had also started posting stylized make-up tutorials on her YouTube channel and tweeted to explain, "My ex-boyfriend would always tell me I looked ugly without make-up on, and I should never been seen without it." She claimed that the same ex-boyfriend was leaking her unreleased videos, photographs of her without make-up, and "very personal demos that only he has" such as a cover of the Pokémon theme song. In response to the alleged leak, she released the cover of the Pokémon theme song herself.

=== 2021–2023: Flux and Zig ===
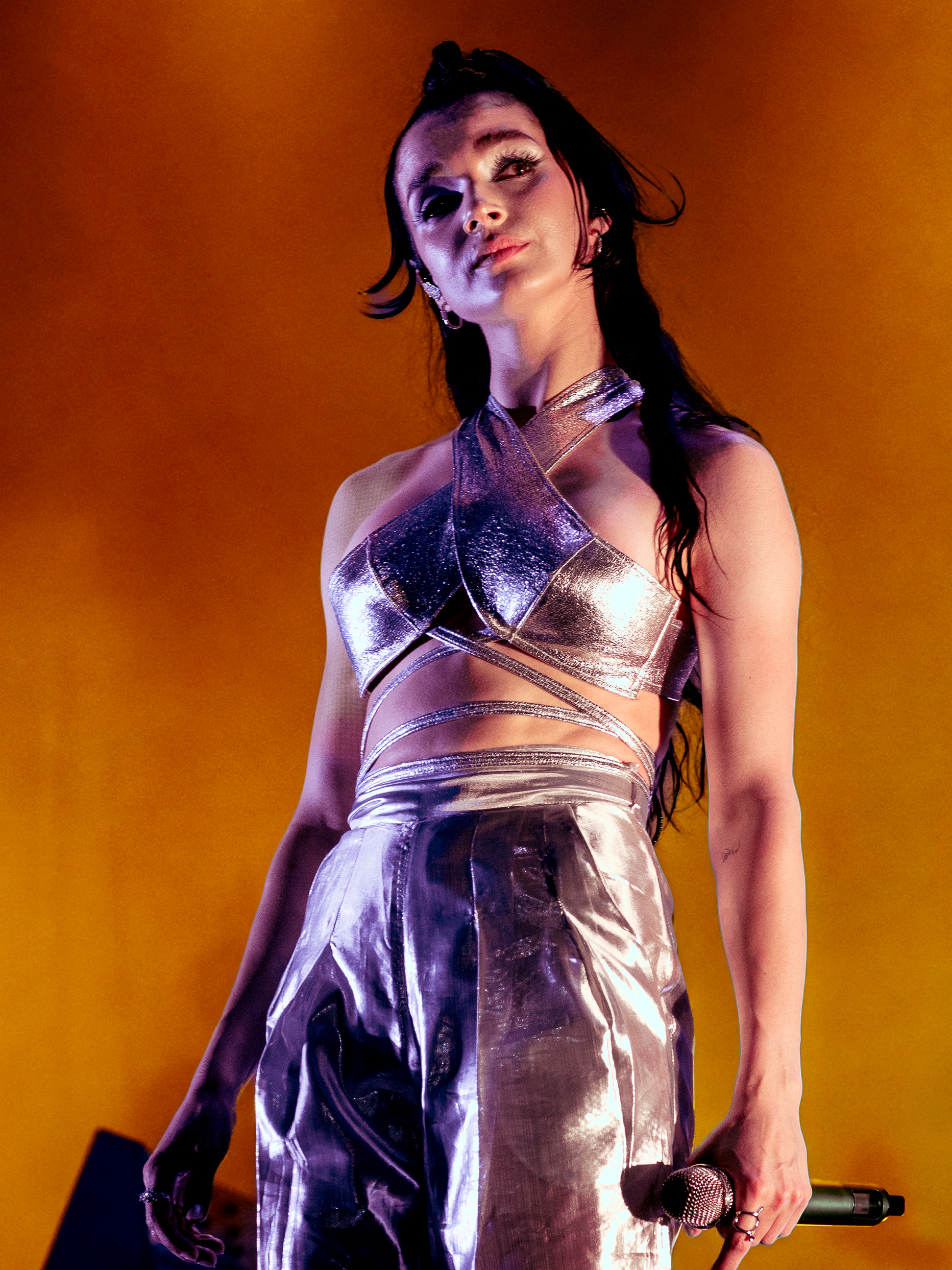
Poppy performing in 2023

In March 2021, Poppy performed live at the Grammys and debuted the song "Eat". In April, her song "Say Cheese" became the official theme song for professional wrestling show WWE NXT, following her performance at the event on April 9, 2021. In May, Poppy released a cover of Jack Off Jill's song "Fear of Dying". In June, she surprise-released her fourth EP, Eat (NXT Soundtrack), which features the previously performed songs "Eat" and "Say Cheese".

On December 29, 2020, Poppy announced that she had been working on the follow-up album to I Disagree and said it will have "a completely different sonic vibe" to its predecessor. In June 2021, she released "Her" as the lead single from her fourth studio album, Flux. In July, she announced that Flux would be released on September 24, 2021, and released the title track as the second single from the album. In August, she released "So Mean" as the third and final single from Flux with an accompanying music video. Poppy and Sumerian Records teamed up with Roblox for its first-ever listening party upon the release of the album, streaming Flux on the gaming platform. Music from the album was integrated throughout nine Roblox games between September 24 and September 26, 2021.

In January 2022, Poppy released a song about her cat Pi, titled "3.14" on YouTube. She also announced the Never Find My Place Tour, which started on March 8 in Sacramento, California, and ended on November 30 in Glasgow. On August 27, 2022, Poppy premiered a song at the Reading Festival called "FYB", an acronym for "Fuck You Back". In September, she signed with Republic and Lava Records, and released the song "FYB". It served as a single from her fifth EP, Stagger, which was released in October. It was also announced that Stagger would be her only release under Republic and Lava Records. A music video for the title track was released alongside the EP. In December, Poppy began teasing new music and announced that she is working on her next album.

In 2023, Poppy returned to Sumerian Records, and released her fifth studio album, Zig, on October 27, 2023. In March 2023, Poppy announced the song "Church Outfit", which was released in April as the album's lead single. The same month, she announced a co-headlining tour with pop-rock band Pvris called the Godless/Goddess Tour, which ran from August 18 to September 15 and included supporting acts Pom Pom Squad and Tommy Genesis. In May, Poppy released a cover of Kittie's song "Spit". In June, she was featured alongside Danny Elfman on Stu Brooks' song "They'll Just Love You". In July, Poppy released the second single from Zig, titled "Knockoff", in addition to an announcement of the album's release date. The album's third single, "Motorbike", was released in September. Zig's fourth and final single, "Hard", was released in October. In December, a music video for "Flicker" was released.

=== 2024–present: Negative Spaces and Empty Hands ===
In November 2023, Poppy was announced as a support act for Thirty Seconds to Mars' U.S. tour dates on their 2024 world tour. In January 2024, she was featured on "V.A.N" by Bad Omens. In April, she was featured on the Knocked Loose single "Suffocate".

On June 4, 2024, Poppy released the single "New Way Out", which was produced by former Bring Me the Horizon keyboardist and producer Jordan Fish. On September 17, 2024, Poppy released another single, "They're All Around Us", and on September 23, 2024, announced her sixth studio album, Negative Spaces, which was released on November 15, 2024.

On September 29, 2024, Poppy joined the Canadian metal band Spiritbox to perform their song "Soft Spine" at the Louder Than Life festival. In October 2024, Poppy announced her own variety show, Improbably Poppy, which premiered on October 11, 2024, on the live-streaming platform Veeps. On October 15, 2024, Poppy released two more singles: "The Cost of Giving Up" and "Crystallized". On November 19, 2024, Poppy announced the "They're All Around Us" tour, which would span 28 cities across North America in 2025.

In November 2024, Poppy's single with Knocked Loose, "Suffocate", was nominated at the 67th annual Grammy Awards in the Best Metal Performance category. On November 27, 2024, Poppy performed "Suffocate" with Knocked Loose on Jimmy Kimmel Live. On March 10, 2025, she appeared on the show again to perform the song "The Cost of Giving Up".

Poppy was featured on the Babymetal song "From Me to U", released on April 4, 2025, and was an opening act for the band on some legs of their world tour during the following months. In June, she announced September and October dates for her They're All Around Us Tour, with Dying Wish and MSPaint as opening acts.

On September 2, 2025, Poppy performed an unreleased track, titled "Bruised Sky", in Worcester, Massachusetts. On September 4, 2025, she released a collaboration single titled, "End of You", with Courtney LaPlante of Spiritbox and Amy Lee of Evanescence. On October 23, 2025, Poppy released the single "Unravel". before announcing an upcoming tour on October 27, with tour dates from January to April 2026 in Europe and Australia. On November 12, she released "Bruised Sky", alongside an official announcement of her next studio album, titled Empty Hands. Prior to the album's release on January 23, 2026, a third single, "Guardian", was released in early December. On the same day as the album release, Poppy released a music video for the album's fourth single, "Time Will Tell". Poppy later announced more tour dates in North America.

In March 2026, Poppy collaborated with Son Lux on the song "In Death We've Just Begun". The song is on the soundtrack for the 2026 sci-shooter video game Marathon. On May 26, 2026, Poppy released a cover of "Hand in My Pocket" by Alanis Morissette, featured in the soundtrack of the coming-of-age film, Mile End Kicks.

On June 17, 2026, Poppy released a music video for her Empty Hands song "Dying to Forget". The video features Isaac Hale of Knocked Loose and Stephen Harrison of House of Protection.

On October 23, 2026, Poppy collaborated with the French studio SoWhen? on Poppy Secret Run, an interactive musical experience released as a Fortnite island which featured her song “Time Will Tell."

== Artistry ==
=== Influences and style ===
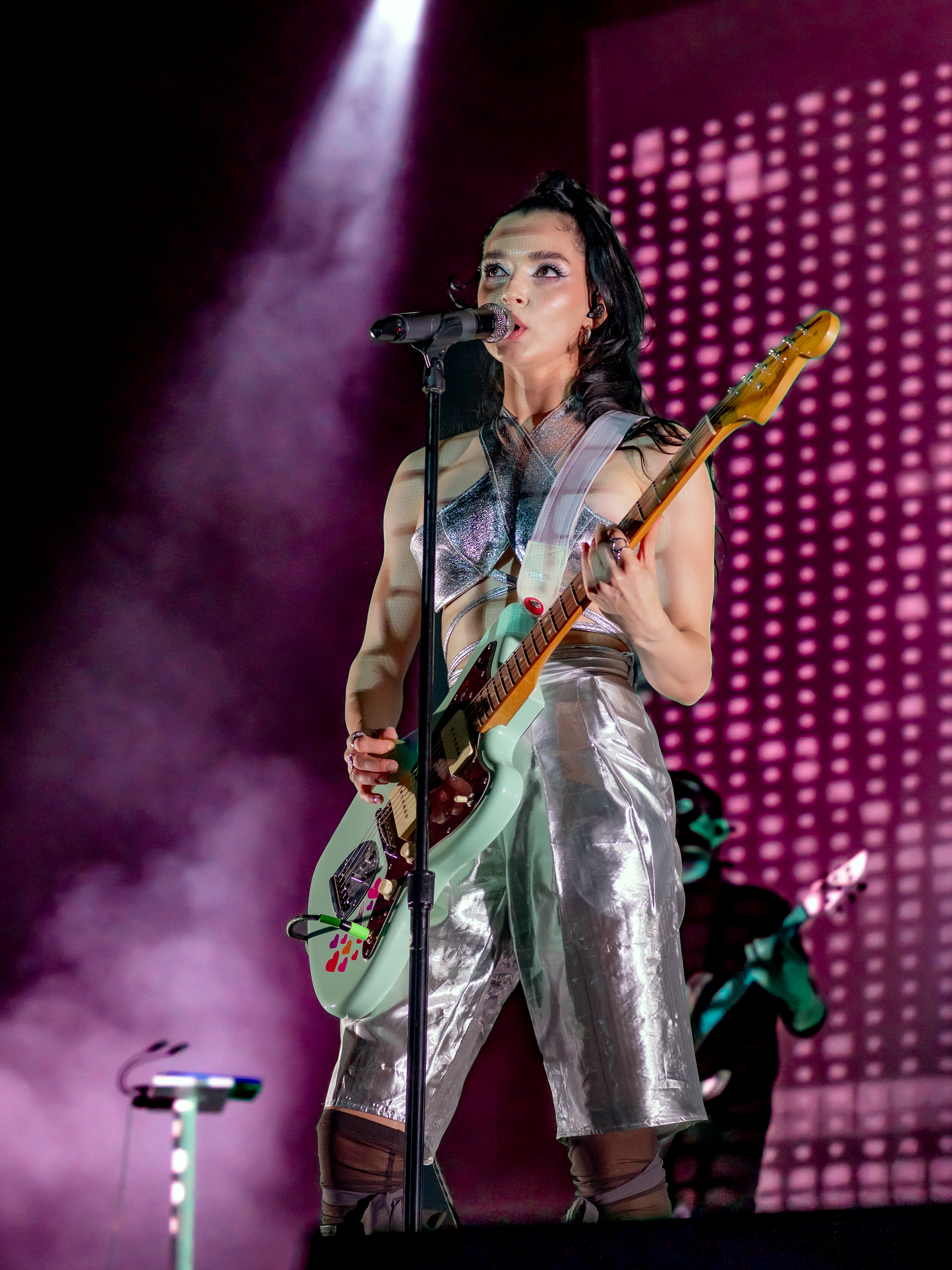
Poppy performing in 2023

Poppy states that she drew inspiration from genres such as J-pop and K-pop, as well as reggae. She recalls beginning to write music in 2012. She told Tiger Beat that her pop musical inspirations are Cyndi Lauper, unicorns, and Elvis Presley. After her musical reinvention, she further cited Nine Inch Nails, Marilyn Manson, and Rob Zombie as influences. She is also a fan of Jimmy Eat World, No Doubt, Norma Jean, Blondie, Gary Numan, Of Montreal, Dolly Parton and Madonna.

Poppy has said that her stage name originated as a nickname given to her by a friend. Early in her career, Poppy was compared to artists such as Grimes, Icona Pop, Melanie Martinez, and Charli XCX. Her musical style has been described as pop, heavy metal, rock, electronic, industrial, and experimental. (Note: Musical styles 1: "pop"; "heavy metal"; "rock"; "electronic"; "industrial"; "experimental") More specifically, her music has covered various other genres, including electropop, bubblegum pop, nu metal, pop-metal, dance-pop, art pop, experimental pop, synth-pop, avant-garde pop, dream pop, shoegaze, pop rock, pop-punk, punk rock, hyperpop, hard rock, noise, ambient, trip hop, grunge, metalcore, alternative pop, alternative rock, industrial metal, and industrial rock. (Note: Musical styles 2: "electropop"; "bubblegum pop"; "nu metal"; "pop-metal"; "dance-pop"; "art pop"; "experimental pop"; "synth-pop"; "avant-garde pop"; "dream pop"; "shoegaze"; "pop rock"; "pop-punk"; "punk rock"; "hyperpop"; "hard rock") (Note: Musical styles 3: "noise"; "ambient"; "grunge"; "trip hop"; "metalcore"; "alternative metal"; "alternative pop"; "alternative rock"; "industrial metal"; "industrial rock")

=== Presentation ===
Poppy previously described herself as a "kawaii Barbie child". A natural brunette, she has dyed her hair many colors, usually to match the aesthetic of each of her albums' respective eras. Her identity was initially kept guarded. She explained in 2016, "I don't want people to talk about how old I am; I want them to talk about what I'm making. [...] People, especially nowadays, are so obsessed with knowing everything. They'll have to invest their time in finding it." In 2018, she stated that she originally kept her identity guarded due to being a survivor of past abuse.

== Public image ==
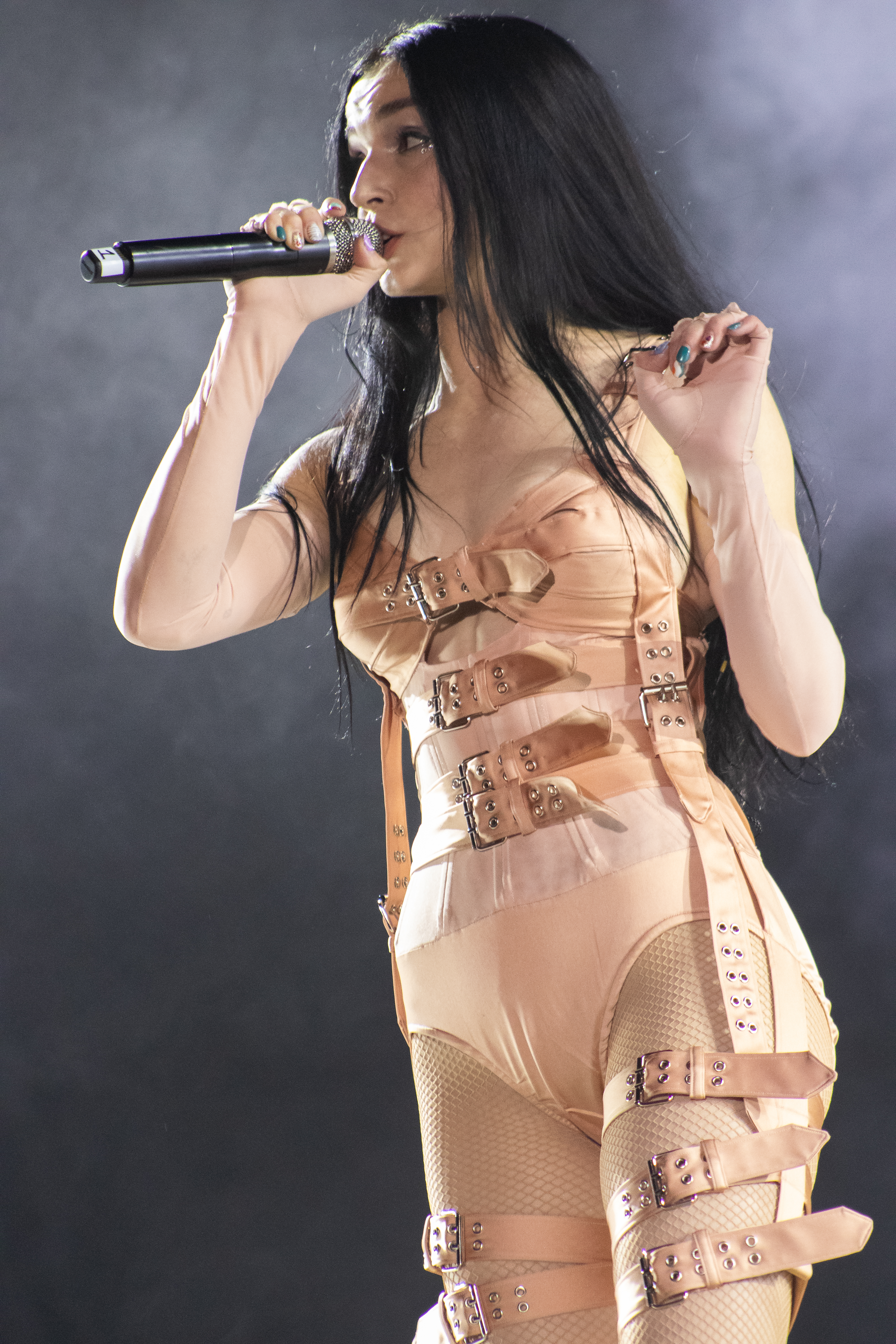
Poppy performing in 2023

Poppy's YouTube channel is often regarded as a commentary on social media. Vice described the tone of the channel, saying in 2022, "If you have the patience to work your way through all the videos on this channel, certain trends start to emerge. The most obvious is Poppy's fixation with the internet and social media culture, which she claims to love. But far more interesting is the general tone of the videos, which have gotten progressively darker over the last two years." Gita Jackson of Kotaku suggested the videos are a commentary on the experience of being online, writing, "In a way, she's made every YouTube video, ever. Her channel is an index of every insincere apology, desperate bid for views and assurance that they couldn't do it without her fans you'll ever see. That Poppy is not only skewering the absurdity of people who make a living as public figures on the internet—she has it out for the entire experience of being online." Mogendorff said the videos are "like social commentary... touch[ing] on the anxieties of modern life" and "a really interesting way of communicating, personal but strange". The channel has been discussed by YouTubers including PewDiePie, Germán Garmendia, Social Repose, Night Mind, and the Film Theorists.

Critics have both praised the catchiness of Poppy's music and described her persona as distant from reality. Racked called her "sweet, but alien" and "brightly addictive". In a review of I Disagree, Neil Z. Yeung of AllMusic called it "a metallic storm, informed by pulsing beats, thrashing riffs, and crushing breakdowns. That fury is punctuated by atmospheric electronics and sugary vocals that support her deceptively confrontational lyrics." David Mogendorff, who works in artist content and services for YouTube and Google Play Music, said she has "a strong J- and K-pop influence".

V magazine listed Poppy as part of the new generation of music, saying that "her hatched-from-an-egg, Glinda the Good Witch vibes have inspired labels from 'human ASMR' to a one-woman 'digital rabbit hole', none of which seem to stick". Paper magazine also listed Poppy as one of the 100 women revolutionizing pop music, noting that "no matter what Poppy does, we can learn to expect the unexpected". Alternative Press cited Poppy in their list of 20 artists who defined the sound of nu-metal. Loudwire picked her as the 2020 artist of the year, while Revolver picked her as the 2024 artist of the year.

== Personal life ==
Poppy began dating rapper Ghostemane in October 2019, and they were engaged in July 2020. They separated and called off their engagement in late 2021.

In 2018, Poppy stated her gender questioning inspired her 2018 album Am I a Girl? However, the following year, she confirmed she had ended her questioning, stating "I am a girl, but I believe everyone should be able to identify with whatever they choose."

She previously followed a vegan diet for years, but quit after developing muscle deficiencies.

Known for her admiration of Japan's culture and language, Poppy has performed throughout the country, and sang in Japanese on her 2017 album Poppy.Computer, her 2019 EP Choke, her 2020 album I Disagree, her 2021 EP Eat, and the 2025 song "From Me to U" by Japanese band Babymetal, which she co-wrote. In 2025, she revealed that she had previously taken Japanese lessons for four years.

== Discography ==
Studio albums

- Poppy.Computer (2017)
- Am I a Girl? (2018)
- I Disagree (2020)
- Flux (2021)
- Zig (2023)
- Negative Spaces (2024)
- Empty Hands (2026)

== Filmography ==
=== Films ===
Year	Title	Role	Notes	Ref.
2019	A Jester's Tale	Rat Queen	Short film	
2024	The Most Perfect Perfect Person	Herself	Short film; also writer	

=== Television ===
Year	Title	Role	Notes	Ref.
2015	Jessie	Student	Uncredited cameo; episode: "4.6"	
2017–2018	The Late Late Show with James Corden	Herself	Musical guest	
2017	Total Request Live	Herself	Musical guest	
2019–2021	WWE NXT	Herself	Musical guest	
2020	NXT Takeover: Portland	Herself	Musical guest	
2021	NXT Takeover: Stand & Deliver	Herself	Musical guest	
2021	The Boulet Brothers' Dragula	Guest judge	Episode: "4.4"	
2022	The Boulet Brothers' Dragula: Titans	Guest judge	Episode: "1.6"	
2024	Jimmy Kimmel Live!	Herself	Musical guest	
2025	Jimmy Kimmel Live!	Herself	Musical guest	

=== Web ===
Year	Title	Role	Notes	Ref.
2015	Everybody Wants to Be Poppy	Herself	Lead voice role	
2017	Internet Famous with Poppy	Herself	Lead role	
2017	YouTube Rewind	Herself	Guest appearance	
2018	Good Mythical Morning	Herself	Guest appearance	
2018	I'm Poppy	Herself	Lead role	
2018	Kids React	Herself	Guest appearance	
2024	Improbably Poppy	Herself	Lead role; also story writer	

== Bibliography ==
- The Gospel of Poppy (2017)
- Genesis 1 (2019)
- Poppy's Inferno (2020)

== Tours ==
- Poppy.Computer Tour (2017–2018)
- Am I a Girl? Tour (2018–2019)
- Threesome Tour (2019; with Bring Me the Horizon and Sleeping with Sirens)
- I Disagree Tour (2020)
- Never Find My Place Tour (2022)
- Godless/Goddess Tour (2023; with Pvris)
- Zig Tour (2024)
- They're All Around Us Tour (2025)
- Constantly Nowhere Tour (2026)

== Awards and nominations ==
Award	Year	Category	Nominated work	Result	Ref.
Grammy Awards	2021	Best Metal Performance	"Bloodmoney"	Nominated	
Grammy Awards	2025	Best Metal Performance	"Suffocate"	Nominated	
Grammy Awards	2027	Best Metal Performance	"End of You"	Pending	
Heavy Music Awards	2020	Best Video	"Scary Mask"	Nominated	
Heavy Music Awards	2025	Best International Act	Herself	Nominated	
Heavy Music Awards	2025	Best Album	Negative Spaces	Nominated	
iHeartRadio Music Awards	2026	Best New Artist (Rock)	Herself	Nominated	
The Independent Media Initiative	2025	IMI Award	Improbably Poppy	Won	
Kerrang! Awards	2022	Best International Act	Herself	Won	
Morecore Music Awards	2026	Best Album	Empty Hands	Nominated	
Nik Nocturnal Awards	2024	Vocalist of the Year	Herself	Nominated	
Nik Nocturnal Awards	2024	Album of the Year	Negative Spaces	Nominated	
Nik Nocturnal Awards	2024	Best Blegh	"They're All Around Us"	Won	
Nik Nocturnal Awards	2024	Breakdown of the Year	"Suffocate"	Won	
Nik Nocturnal Awards	2024	Collab Song of the Year	"Suffocate"	Won	
Nik Nocturnal Awards	2024	Collab Song of the Year	"V.A.N"	Nominated	
Nik Nocturnal Awards	2025	Collab Song of the Year	"End of You"	Won	
Revolver Awards	2025	Song of the Year	"End of You"	Won	
Rock Sound Awards	2024	Song of the Year	"V.A.N"	Won	
Shorty Awards	2018	Best in Weird	Herself	Won	
Streamy Awards	2017	Breakthrough Artist	Herself	Won	
Tiger Beat 19 Under 19 Awards	2016	Most Influential Song	"Lowlife"	Nominated	
Unicorn Awards	2017	Iconic Moment of the Year	Herself	Won	
Unicorn Awards	2017	Song of the Year	"Computer Boy"	Nominated	
WOWIE Awards	2020	Outstanding Song	"I Disagree"	Nominated	
YouTube Creator Awards	2017	Gold Creator Award	Herself	Won	
