= I'm Poppy =

Television series

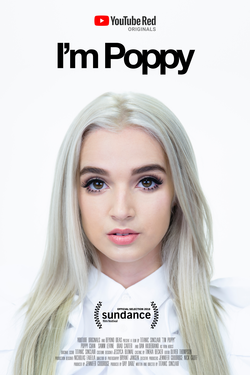
- Promotional poster
- Genre: Surreal comedy; Satire
- Created by: Titanic Sinclair
- Written by: Titanic Sinclair
- Directed by: Titanic Sinclair
- Starring: Poppy; Samm Levine; Dan Hildebrand; Brad Carter; Kofi Boakye; Madison Lawlor
- Composer: Titanic Sinclair
- Country of origin: United States
- Original language: English

Production
- Executive producers: Jennifer Goodridge; Nick Groff
- Producers: Jennifer Goodridge; Bay Dariz
- Cinematography: Bryant Jansen
- Editor: Oliver Thompson
- Camera setup: Single-camera
- Running time: 24 minutes
- Production company: Beyond Ideas

Original release
- Network: YouTube Red
- Release: January 25, 2018

I'm Poppy is a surreal comedy pilot starring American singer Poppy. It premiered at the Sundance Film Festival on January 23, 2018, and is available exclusively on YouTube Premium. At the time, the producer expected further episodes. Originally planned as web-series, the idea was eventually scrapped.

== Premise ==
The official Sundance Institute synopsis for the first episode states, "Join internet sensation Poppy as she enters the real world for the very first time and quickly realizes that fame and fortune come at a price, with secret societies, dangerous fanatics, and a very envious mannequin named Charlotte."

== Cast and characters ==
=== Main ===
- Poppy as herself
- Samm Levine as Johnny
- Dan Hildebrand as Ivan Kross
- Brad Carter as Able Abraham
- Kofi Boakye as God and Satan
- Madison Lawlor as Pop Star

=== Guests ===
- Brian Dare as Benton
- Paige Annette as Crew Member #1
- Sierra Santana as Crew Member #2
- Dan Fleming as Crew Member #3
- Israel Wright as Cult Member
- Irena Murphy as Reporter

== Production ==
=== Development ===
On December 4, 2017, director and writer of the series, Titanic Sinclair, officially announced the show on his Twitter account for the first time, describing it as "easily the most ambitious and exciting thing I’ve ever been a part of". This was followed by an announcement of the dates it would be airing through during the festival: January 23, 24, and 26. On January 16, 2018, tickets to the show at the festival went on sale to the public. The series premiered on YouTube Red on January 25, 2018.

Poppy has described the series as being "based on real experiences" and that the producers are "just telling what it’s like to be in Hollywood."

=== Marketing ===
On January 22, 2018, a trailer for the series was uploaded to Poppy's YouTube account.

== Reception ==
The Hollywood Reporter critic Daniel Fienberg said he found the pilot episode "inspired and distinctive", but couldn't imagine the series "holding up for another episode". The Verge's Adi Robertson said it didn't have the same hypnotic and ambiguous simplicity that many of the Poppy's videos do and that the episode was not "weird enough". Julia Alexander from Polygon said it was the proof that YouTube Red could be great, characterizing the series as "enjoyable" and "authentically YouTube".
