= Suffocate (Knocked Loose song) =

Single by Knocked Loose featuring Poppy

from the album You Won't Go Before You're Supposed To
- Released: April 23, 2024
- Length: 2:44
- Label: Pure Noise
- Songwriters: Bryan Garris; Isaac Hale; Kevin Kaine; Kevin Otten; Nickolas Calderon
- Producer: Drew Fulk

Knocked Loose singles chronology
"Don't Reach for Me" (2024)	"Suffocate" (2024)	"Hive Mind" (2026)

Poppy singles chronology
"V.A.N" (2024)	"Suffocate" (2024)	"New Way Out" (2024)

Music video
- "Suffocate" on YouTube

"Suffocate" is a song recorded by American hardcore punk band Knocked Loose, featuring guest vocals from American singer Poppy. It was released on April 23, 2024, through Pure Noise Records. It served as the third single from the band's third studio album, You Won't Go Before You're Supposed To (2024). The song received a Grammy nomination in the Best Metal Performance category.

The song appeared on the official WWE 2K25 soundtrack album in March 2025.

== Background ==
On February 27, 2024, Knocked Loose announced their album You Won't Go Before You're Supposed To and revealed the track listing, showing Poppy being featured on the album. The collaboration emerged when Poppy reached out to the band's vocalist Bryan Garris, expressing her interest in working together. "Suffocate" features screams from Garris and Poppy over a beat that starts with a furious, hard-hitting riff, leading into a heavy reggaeton-inspired breakdown.

== Live performances ==
Knocked Loose and Poppy debuted "Suffocate" live on April 27, 2024, at the Sick New World festival in Las Vegas. The band also performed the song on Jimmy Kimmel Live! along with Poppy on November 27, 2024. It has been described as one of the most hardcore performances on the Jimmy Kimmel Live! stage, as they performed it in the pouring rain.

== Cover versions ==
Japanese girl group f5ve posted a dance video to "Suffocate", using the choreography of their single "Lettuce". In September 2024, singer Harper released a cover of the song.

== Accolades ==
"Suffocate" was nominated at the 67th Annual Grammy Awards in the category of Best Metal Performance, which became Knocked Loose's first nomination. It also became Poppy's second nomination in the same category, after 2019's "Bloodmoney". "Suffocate" entered Spotify's Viral 50 charts, peaking at number 10. It charted on Billboard's Hot Rock & Alternative Songs, peaking at number 46.

Critics' year-end rankings of "Suffocate”
Publication	List	Rank	Ref.
NME	The 50 Best Songs of 2024	17	
Metal Hammer	The 50 Best Metal Songs of 2024	13	

== Charts ==
Chart performance for "Suffocate"
Chart (2024)	Peak position
US Hot Rock & Alternative Songs (Billboard)	46
