= Time Is Up (song) =

Single by Poppy featuring Diplo

from the album Am I a Girl?
- B-side: "In a Minute"
- Released: August 22, 2018
- Genre: Electropop; dance-pop
- Length: 3:31
- Label: I'm Poppy; Mad Decent
- Songwriters: Thomas Wesley Pentz; Vaughn Oliver; Titanic Sinclair; Moriah Pereira; Jasper Helderman; Thomas Helsloot; Tommy English; Simon Wilcox
- Producers: Thomas Wesley Pentz; Jasper Helderman; Thomas Helsloot; Vaughn Oliver

Poppy singles chronology
"In a Minute" (2018)	"Time Is Up" (2018)	"Fashion After All" (2018)

Diplo singles chronology
"Sun in Our Eyes" (2018)	"Time Is Up" (2018)	"Close to Me" (2018)

Music video
- "Time Is Up" on YouTube

"Time Is Up" is a song by American singer Poppy, featuring American music producer Diplo. It was released by Mad Decent on August 22, 2018 as the second single from Poppy's second studio album Am I a Girl? (2018). It was written by Poppy, Simon Wilcox, Titanic Sinclair, Tommy English and its producers Diplo, Jasper Helderman, Thomas Helsloot and Vaughn Oliver.

It is an electropop and dance-pop song about the end of humans and the rise of robots. The cover art features Poppy with electrode patches on her head, which is also a recurring scene in the music video. The music video was released along with the song.

== Reception ==
Idolator's Mike Wass called the song an "apocalyptic electropop anthem about the end of the human race", and noted Poppy's robotic vocal delivery as well as the song's "ominous" chorus. Steph Evans of Dancing Astronaut said the song is "infectious modern pop underlined by Diplo's production".

== Promotion ==
Poppy teased her collaboration with Diplo on social media in August, posting an image of her with the electrode patches on her temples from the music video. She first performed the song on television in September 2018 in an appearance on The Late Late Show with James Corden.

== Music video ==
The music video was directed by Titanic Sinclair and released in August 2018, and features Poppy giving a pill to various human test subjects. It depicts a retelling of Poppy's rise to fame in a futuristic dystopian world. Idolator called the video "suitably chilling" to match the song. It has received over seven million views on YouTube since its release.

== Track listing ==
Digital download
No.	Title	Length
1.	"Time Is Up" (featuring Diplo)	3:31

Die-cut picture disc

1. "Time Is Up" (featuring Diplo)
2. "In a Minute"

== Release history ==
Release dates and formats for "Time Is Up"
Region	Date	Format(s)	Label	Ref.
Various	August 22, 2018	Digital download; streaming	Mad Decent	
Various	November 5, 2018	LP	Mad Decent	
