= Jordan Fish =

British record producer and keyboardist (born 1986)

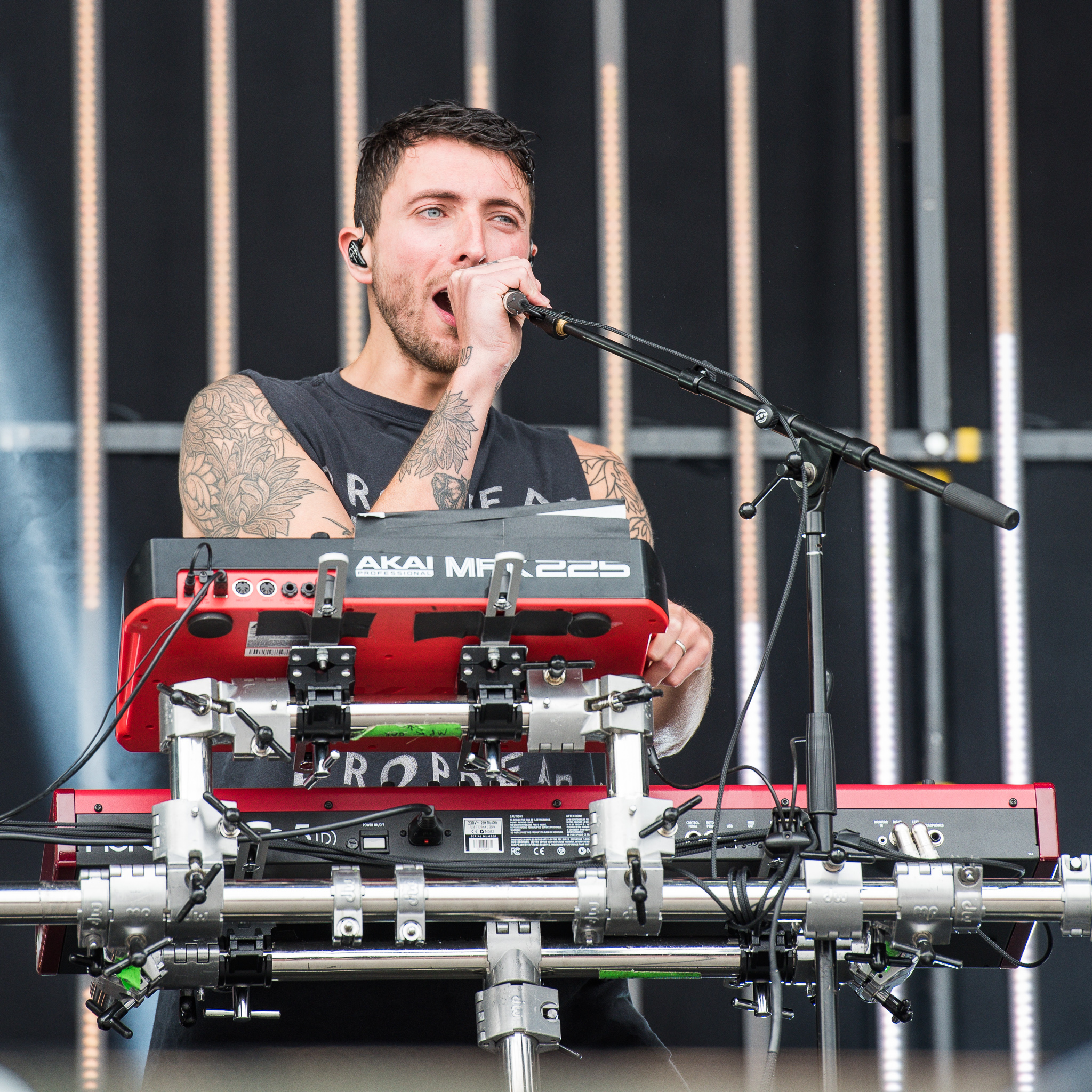
- Fish in 2016

Background information
- Born: Jordan Keith Attwood Fish; 26 June 1986 (age 40); Reading, Berkshire, England
- Genres: Electronica; electronic rock; pop rock; alternative metal; alternative rock; metalcore
- Occupations: Musician; record producer; songwriter
- Instruments: Keyboards; percussion
- Years active: 2010–present
- Formerly of: Bring Me the Horizon; Worship

Jordan Keith Attwood Fish (born 26 June 1986) is a British record producer, songwriter, and musician. A member of the electronic band Worship from 2010 to 2013, he rose to prominence as the keyboardist and producer of the rock band Bring Me the Horizon from 2012 to 2023, appearing on five studio releases: Sempiternal (2013), That's the Spirit (2015), Amo (2019), Post Human: Survival Horror (2020) and Post Human: Nex Gen (2024). Since leaving the band, Fish has focused on a full-time career as a songwriter and record producer, working with artists such as Poppy, Halsey, Babymetal, House of Protection, Architects, Good Charlotte, and Evanescence.

== Early life ==
Fish was born on 26 June 1986, in Reading, England. He grew up listening to soul music, such as Whitney Houston and Luther Vandross, because of his mother. He started getting into rock music at age 12 and played in a nu metal band at age 14, citing Deftones, Slipknot and Korn among his formative influences. When Fish was in college, he began exploring electronic music with a couple of friends.

== Career ==
=== 2010–2013: Worship ===
In 2010, Fish was a member of the electronic band Worship, along with Tim Alexander, James Johnson and Tom Mayo, bedding live performance with electronic elements. Worship posted their first song onto YouTube titled "Collateral" in November 2010. Worship released their debut single, "House of Glass" in October 2011. An album titled Nothing Is Sacred, which contains songs recorded by Fish with the band between 2010 and 2013, was released on September 2, 2019.

=== 2012–2023: Bring Me the Horizon ===
In 2012, Fish began working with the rock band Bring Me the Horizon on their fourth studio album, Sempiternal. Oli Sykes was a fan of Fish's previous work and invited him to add some electronics on the album. This expanded into Fish helping out with the writing process. After the album was finished, Fish joined the band on tour. In early 2013, Fish officially left Worship and became a full-time member of Bring Me the Horizon, becoming a key creative member of the band, contributing keyboards and songwriting. Fish was named Keyboardist of the Year by Alternative Press following his work on Sempiternal. The same year, he produced and engineered Robin Trower's album Roots and Branches.

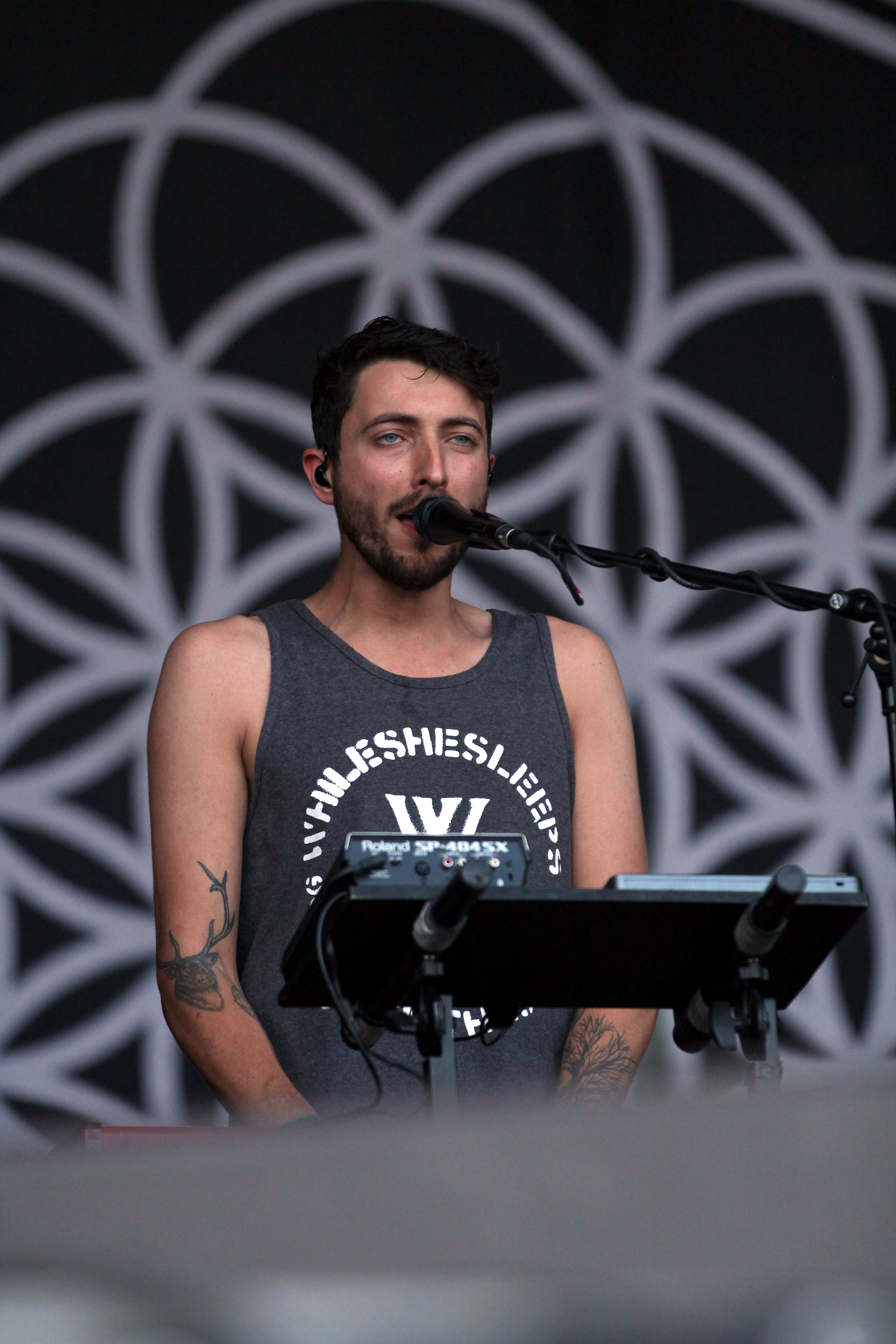
Fish performing in 2014

Fish had worked with American band Machine Head twice, contributing to the writing and string arrangements for their 2014 studio album Bloodstone & Diamonds and post-production for their 2018 studio album Catharsis.

In September 2015, Bring Me the Horizon released their fifth studio album That's the Spirit, the band's first fully self-produced album, with Fish handling production duties. Fish felt that the band "had artistic freedom to explore different styles of music" because of this, helping to evolve the band's sound from metalcore towards a more experimental and electronic-driven direction. Their sixth studio album Amo was released on 25 January 2019. Fish again took up production duties for the band. Amo reached number one on the UK Albums Chart.

Along with Bring Me the Horizon bandmate Oli Sykes, Fish worked with Halsey as a co-writer and co-producer on her 2020 track "Experiment on Me". This song was created for the movie Birds of Prey and appeared on the movie's soundtrack.

On 30 October 2020, Bring Me the Horizon released Post Human: Survival Horror, an EP that was intended to be the first in a series of "Post Human" records. Fish took up a co-producer role with Oli Sykes this time, while Australian composer Mick Gordon made additional production contributions. Post Human: Survival Horror became the band's second number one album. In late 2023, Fish took some time away touring with the band, and on 22 December 2023, the band announced that they had parted ways with Fish; the split was described as amicable, with both sides expressing appreciation for their years of collaboration. Bring Me the Horizon released Post Human: Nex Gen on 24 May 2024, which featured contributions from Fish.

=== 2023–present: Independent production and songwriting career ===
After leaving Bring Me The Horizon, Fish transitioned into working full-time as a producer and songwriter. producing for both established and emerging artists, including Babymetal, Poppy, Halsey, Amy Lee, House of Protection, Architects, Good Charlotte, and S10. He has occasionally performed live with artists he has collaborated with, including S10.

In 2023, Fish engineered "Theorem" by Puscifer from their album Existential Reckoning: Re-Wired. The same year, Fish and Kane Churko co-produced the track "Make It Out Alive" by One Ok Rock. After leaving Bring Me the Horizon, Fish started working with Canadian heavy metal band Spiritbox. He worked with former Fever 333 members Aric Improta and Stephen Harrison for their project House of Protection, producing and co-writing their debut EP Galore, which was released on 13 September 2024 through Red Bull Records. Fish also worked with Architects around the same time, producing and co-writing the song "Curse", and "varying the energy and color of their sound"; on recruiting Fish at Germany's Rock am Ring festival, band drummer Dan Searle saying "We had this big chat with him, like, ‘What would you do next? Be honest? Where would you take it? What are we doing right, what are we doing wrong? Lay it on us", saying "he had something to prove coming out of [Bring Me the Horizon] and we had something to prove to ourselves. So, it worked".

While being interviewed at Download Festival 2024, British pop-punk band Busted revealed that they were working on new music with Fish. Fish made a surprise return to the stage on 15 October 2024, performing vocals as part of House of Protection's first show in London. Fish produced and co-wrote Poppy's sixth studio album Negative Spaces, which was released on 15 November 2024 through Sumerian Records. Fish once again worked with Stephen Harrison as part of the album's writing process. In 2025, Fish also worked with Good Charlotte around the same time, producing and co-writing the song "Rejects". Fish also produced Poppy's seventh studio album Empty Hands, which was released on January 23, 2026.

== Equipment ==
While performing with Bring Me the Horizon, Fish used a setup called the Stormtrooper. The Stormtrooper was built around Apple's MainStage software, which was controlled by a pair of Arturia KeyLab II MkIIs and an Arturia BeatStep. Fish used the BeatStep for "a lot of one-shot button stuff" and playing sounds that would be difficult to re-create live. It also included some additional percussion. Before changing to the Arturias, he used various Nord and Akai keyboards.

In a live session for Triple J as a member of Poppy's backing band, Fish used a much more scaled-down setup. He only used one Arturia keyboard and removed the BeatStep and additional percussion entirely.

== Musical techniques and impact ==
Fish plays a number of instruments, but "never really felt tied to one." He cites Trent Reznor, Brian Eno, James Blake, Red Hot Chili Peppers, Green Day and Deftones as early influences on his guitar playing. He later switched to bass guitar because he felt that he wasn't "good enough on guitar." Before joining Bring Me the Horizon, he played keyboards in Worship. Once Fish joined the group, critics noted how he influenced the band's progression in sound and music production. He credits Radiohead as the band that got him into electronic music. Fish uses Pro Tools to write songs and engineer multiple layers of instrumentals, sounds and vocals. He tends to write out parts that fit a certain track and blend it all together.

Fish considers himself a musician but not in "the traditional sense." He has spoken about his musical ability stating, "I'm a good musician in some senses, but I'm not particularly a good player. I don't think you necessarily need to be held back by your piano or keys ability, you know what I mean? I think your creativity is the most important thing... As long as you can make some music that you think is cool, and people connect with it, then that is way more important to me." NME described Fish as “one of the most in-demand producers in the rock and metal world"; on being called a "super-producer", Fish said:

"I'm not bothered about any of that stuff... as long as you keep your standards high. With every project I take on, I want to try and immerse myself to the point where I feel like I am the artist. When I'm working with Poppy – I'm Poppy! If someone hates it, it hurts me too. I want to come away and feel like I’ve given it everything. This is my fucking baby as well,” he concludes. “That's how I feel about Architects too... I'm an equal when we’re in the studio. I'm emotionally invested in every project and the artist's career – I want to see them win."

Artists across the heavy scene have lauded the influence of Fish's production style on their music: Oli Sykes crediting Fish's work on the Bring Me the Horizon album Sempiternal as making Fish "one of the leaders in terms of composition". LouderSound calling the album “the most influential metal album of its generation", and Kerrang! praising the "fresh songwriting input" Fish brought to the album; Dan Searle saying saying Fish "had something to prove coming out of [Bring Me the Horizon to work with Architects] and we had something to prove to ourselves"; and Poppy calling Fish "such a creative force [who] is very good at tracking performance [and has] an appreciation for heavy music and more saccharine pop music”.

== Personal life ==
Fish lives in West Berkshire, England, and is married to his wife Emma, a former member of a Dutch girl/boy band XYP, who performed additional vocals on "Happy Song" from Bring Me the Horizon's album That's the Spirit. They have two children.

In August 2016, Fish and Oli Sykes climbed Mount Kilimanjaro to raise money for charity at the Pediatric intensive care unit at Southampton hospital, after his son Eliot had suffered a brain haemorrhage and been cared for at that hospital unit. Fish and Sykes raised more than £50,000. In 2023, Eliot ran a mini-marathon to raise money for the same cause.

== Discography ==
=== Worship ===
- Nothing Is Sacred (2019)

=== Bring Me the Horizon ===
- Sempiternal (2013)
- That's the Spirit (2015)
- Amo (2019)
- Music to Listen To... (2019)
- Post Human: Survival Horror (2020)
- Post Human: Nex Gen (2024)

=== Other appearances ===
Title	Year	Artist(s)	Album	Notes	Ref.
"Dying to Forget"		Poppy	Empty Hands		
"Time Will Tell"		Poppy	Empty Hands		
"Bruised Sky"		Poppy	Empty Hands		
"Unravel"		Poppy	Empty Hands		
"Rejects"	2025	Good Charlotte	Motel Du Cap	Producer, co-writer	
"End of You"	2025	Poppy, Amy Lee, and Courtney LaPlante	Non-album single	Producer, co-writer	
"Hand That Feeds"	2025	Halsey and Amy Lee	From the World of John Wick: Ballerina	Producer, co-writer	
"From Me to U"	2025	Babymetal (featuring Poppy)	Metal Forth	Producer	
Outrun You All	2025	House of Protection	Extended play	Producer, co-writer	
"Brain Dead"	2025	Architects (featuring House of Protection)	The Sky, the Earth & All Between	Producer, co-writer	
"Everything Ends"	2025	Architects	The Sky, the Earth & All Between	Producer, co-writer	
"Blackhole"	2025	Architects	The Sky, the Earth & All Between	Producer, co-writer	
"Curse"	2024	Architects	The Sky, the Earth & All Between	Producer, co-writer	
"Whiplash"	2024	Architects	The Sky, the Earth & All Between	Producer, co-writer	
"New Way Out"	2024	Poppy	Negative Spaces	Producer, co-writer, lyrics	
"They're All Around Us"	2024	Poppy	Negative Spaces	Producer, co-writer, lyrics	
"It's Supposed to Hurt"	2024	House of Protection	Galore	Producer, co-writer, programming, background vocals	
"Make It Out Alive"	2023	One Ok Rock		Producer	
"Theorem"	2023	Puscifer	Existential Reckoning: Re-Wired	Engineering	
".Salt."	2021	Dead Poet Society	-!-	Mixing, engineering, producer, recording, remix engineering	
"Lullaby"	2021	Against the Current	Fever	Co-writer	
"Catharsis"	2018	Machine Head	Catharsis	Post-production	
"Kaleidoscope"	2018	Machine Head	Catharsis	Post-production	
"Heavy Lies the Crown"	2018	Machine Head	Catharsis	Post-production	
"Eulogy"	2018	Machine Head	Catharsis	Post-production	
"Ghosts Will Haunt My Bones"	2014	Machine Head	Bloodstone & Diamonds	Arrangement, creation, composer, keyboards, soundscape, string arrangements	
"In Comes the Flood"	2014	Machine Head	Bloodstone & Diamonds	Arrangement, creation, composer, keyboards, soundscape, string arrangements	
"Damage Inside"	2014	Machine Head	Bloodstone & Diamonds	Arrangement, creation, composer, keyboards, soundscape, string arrangements	
"Full Swing"	2013	Comeback Kid	Die Knowing	Recording, vocal engineer	
"Sheltered Moon"	2013	Robin Trower	Roots and Branches	Producer, engineering	
"See My Life"	2013	Robin Trower	Roots and Branches	Producer, engineering	
"Enter the Men"	2011	Turbo-Laser	Turbo-Laser	Backing vocals, bass, guitar, keyboards, producer, programming	
"Planet X"	2011	Turbo-Laser	Turbo-Laser	Backing vocals, bass, guitar, keyboards, producer, programming	
"Ultra Metal"	2011	Turbo-Laser	Turbo-Laser	Backing vocals, bass, guitar, keyboards, producer, programming	
"Ramming Speed"	2011	Turbo-Laser	Turbo-Laser	Backing vocals, bass, guitar, keyboards, producer, programming	
"The Dawn Patrol"	2011	Turbo-Laser	Turbo-Laser	Backing vocals, bass, guitar, keyboards, producer, programming	
"Monsters From the Deep"	2011	Turbo-Laser	Turbo-Laser	Backing vocals, bass, guitar, keyboards, producer, programming	
"The Battle of Newbury"	2011	Turbo-Laser	Turbo-Laser	Backing vocals, bass, guitar, keyboards, producer, programming	
"Smooth Dude"	2011	Turbo-Laser	Turbo-Laser	Backing vocals, bass, guitar, keyboards, producer, programming	
"Ghost Fighter"	2011	Turbo-Laser	Turbo-Laser	Backing vocals, bass, guitar, keyboards, producer, programming	
"For the Glory of Metal"	2011	Turbo-Laser	Turbo-Laser	Backing vocals, bass, guitar, keyboards, producer, programming	
"Celebrity One"	2011	Turbo-Laser	Turbo-Laser	Backing vocals, bass, guitar, keyboards, producer, programming	
"Jungle Mission"	2011	Turbo-Laser	Turbo-Laser	Backing vocals, bass, guitar, keyboards, producer, programming	
"Luckmore Drive"	2010	Bright Spark Destroyer	Holy Yell	Producer	
"They Already Know"	2010	Bright Spark Destroyer	Holy Yell	Producer	
"The Shortest Distance"	2010	Bright Spark Destroyer	Holy Yell	Producer	
"Unknown Forces"	2010	Bright Spark Destroyer	Holy Yell	Producer	
"A Feeling of Health"	2010	Bright Spark Destroyer	Holy Yell	Producer	

== Accolades ==
Publication	Accolade	Year	Rank	Ref.
Alternative Press	Best Keyboardist	2013	1	
