= Scary Mask =

Single by Poppy featuring Fever 333

from the EP Choke
- Released: May 29, 2019
- Genre: Pop-rock; heavy metal
- Length: 3:03
- Label: Mad Decent
- Songwriters: Moriah Pereira; Corey Mixter; Chris Greatti; Stephen Harrison; Zakk Cervini
- Producers: Chris Greatti; Zakk Cervini

Poppy singles chronology
"Voicemail" (2019)	"Scary Mask" (2019)	"Choke" (2019)

Fever 333 singles chronology
"One of Us" (2019)	"Scary Mask" (2019)	"Kingdom" (2019)

Music video
- "Scary Mask on YouTube

"Scary Mask" is a song recorded by American singer-songwriter Poppy, featuring American rock band Fever 333. It was released through Mad Decent on May 29, 2019, as the second single from her second EP, Choke.

== Background ==
In January 2019, the glitchy-pop song "Voicemail" was released as the lead single from Choke. Its music video served as a follow-up to Poppy's 2018 music video "X". During an interview with Interview Magazine regarding "Voicemail", she announced that her next single would be "Scary Mask". In April, she began posting teasers for the song. During an interview with Billboard Music Awards, she announced the song's official release date.

The song was written after "X" while Poppy was trying to expand on the idea of making more metal music. She came up with the song's idea when she attended the American Music Awards wearing a black latex mask.

In June 2020, the song was featured as a lip sync battle in The Drag Ball 3 episode titled “Scary Mask”, where the contestants had to create their own scary masks.

== Live performance ==
Poppy performed "Scary Mask" and "I Disagree" live at the WWE NXT in October 2019, during Io Shirai's entrance.

== Reception ==
The music video for "Scary Mask" is included in Revolver's Top 10 Best Music Videos in 2019, as well as The Spaces' list.

Danielle Chelosky of Kerrang! said: "Poppy’s pop-princess energy clashes with FEVER 333’s dark-hardcore energy to make an especially creepy mix."

== Accolades ==
"Scary Mask" was nominated for Best Music Video at the 2020 Heavy Music Awards.
