= House of Protection =

American electronic rock duo

- Origin: Los Angeles, California
- Genres: Electronic rock; post-hardcore; electronicore; hardcore punk
- Years active: 2024–present
- Label: Red Bull
- Spinoff of: Fever 333, Night Verses
- Members: Stephen Harrison; Aric Improta
- Website: houseofprotectionmusic.com

House of Protection is an American electronic rock duo from Los Angeles. They released their debut EP, Galore, on Red Bull Records on September 13, 2024. Their second EP, Outrun You All, released on May 23, 2025.

== History ==
Stephen Harrison and Aric Improta met in 2017 as members of rock/metal band Fever 333. Harrison was formerly the guitarist in The Chariot, and Improta also drums in Night Verses. In October 2022, Harrison and Improta announced their joint departure from Fever 333. In April 2024, it was reported that Harrison and Improta had formed a new band, House of Protection, and that they had signed to Red Bull Records by A&R Kenny "Tick" Salcido. The band name was inspired by the 1994 Massive Attack album Protection, and also to indicate that the project would protect their creativity. Although neither had previously been a lead vocalist, they decided they would share lead vocal duties in House of Protection.

Their debut single "It's Supposed to Hurt" was released on April 30, 2024, along with an official music video. The song was produced by former Bring Me the Horizon member Jordan Fish, and also made in collaboration with Nick DePirro, who plays with Improta in Night Verses. "It's Supposed to Hurt" was featured on the soundtrack to the video game WWE 2K25. Their second single, "Learn to Forget", was released on June 7, 2024. Their third single, "Being One", was released on June 27, 2024, along with an official music video directed by Kevin Garcia, that was influenced by the 1981 film Koyaanisqatsi. On August 9, 2024, the band released the single "Pulling Teeth". The music video for the single was filmed in Ahmedabad, India, with the band performing the song at the bottom of a "wall of death" while stunt drivers on motorcycles and in cars drove around them; it was directed by Kevin Garcia and produced by Naimish Parekh.

House of Protection's debut EP, Galore, was released on September 13, 2024, on Red Bull Records and was produced by Jordan Fish.

On February 18, 2025, the duo released "Afterlife", the lead single from their upcoming second EP, Outrun You All, set for release on Red Bull Records on May 23, 2025. On February 26, 2025, House of Protection featured on the Architects single "Brain Dead" from their album The Sky, the Earth & All Between. House of Protection was featured on Spotify's Artists to Watch 2025 list.

== Influences ==
House of Protection influences include bands such as The Smashing Pumpkins, Massive Attack, The Prodigy, Cocteau Twins, Alice Glass, Sleigh Bells, Phantogram, The Chariot, Night Verses and Bring Me the Horizon.

== Members ==
- Stephen Harrison – vocals, guitar (2024–present)
- Aric Improta – vocals, drums (2024–present)

== Performances ==
House of Protection played their first live shows at The Echo in Los Angeles on October 4, 2024, and at Underworld in London on October 15, 2024. In January 2025, they went on tour in Australia in support of Bad Omens. From April 1, 2025, the duo supported Poppy on the US leg of her They're All Around Us tour. In the summer of 2025, they played at festivals including Rock for People in the Czech Republic, Download Festival in the UK, and Reading and Leeds Festival in England. House of Protection and Wage War supported Architects on their 2025 European tour, beginning in Paris on September 29, 2025.

== Discography ==
=== EPs ===
Title	Album details
Galore	Released: September 13, 2024; Label: Red Bull Records; Formats: EP, digital download
Outrun You All	Released: May 23, 2025; Label: Red Bull Records; Formats: EP, digital download

=== Singles ===
==== As lead artist ====
- "It's Supposed to Hurt" (2024)
- "Learn to Forget" (2024)
- "Being One" (2024)
- "Pulling Teeth" (2024)
- "Afterlife" (2025)
- "Fire" (2025)
- "I Need More Than This" (2025)

==== As featured artist ====
- "Brain Dead" (Architects featuring House of Protection) (2025)
- "Inside Out" (UnityTX featuring House of Protection) (2026)
