= Bloodmoney =

2019 single by Poppy

- Screenshot of the "Bloodmoney" music video

Single by Poppy

from the album I Disagree
- Released: November 6, 2019
- Genre: Industrial metal; noise pop; dubstep
- Length: 3:03
- Label: Sumerian
- Songwriters: Moriah Pereira; Corey Mixter; Chris Greatti; Zakk Cervini
- Producers: Chris Greatti; Zakk Cervini

Poppy singles chronology
"I Disagree" (2019)	"Bloodmoney" (2019)	"Fill the Crown" (2019)

Music video
- "Bloodmoney" on YouTube

"Bloodmoney" is a song by American singer-songwriter Poppy from her third studio album I Disagree (2020). It was released through Sumerian Records on November 6, 2019, serving as the third single from the album.

It was nominated for Best Metal Performance at the 63rd Annual Grammy Awards, making Poppy the first solo female artist to be nominated for the award.

== Background ==
"Bloodmoney" follows "Concrete" and "I Disagree" on I Disagree, which were both released in 2019 to promote the album.

The song mainly focuses on religious hypocrisy. It also talks about her negative experiences with previous record labels and how she felt controlled by a mostly-male team. The music video, directed by Titanic Sinclair, was shot in one take.

== Composition ==
"Bloodmoney" is an industrial metal, noise pop, and dubstep song with "abrasive, pulsating blasts of low-end noise punctuating Poppy's screeched vocals", as well as a guitar solo. It is considered heavier than her previous releases, though it also features elements of EDM and electronic metal.

== Reception ==
Philip Trapp from Loudwire states, "It probably won't win over any evangelicals, but the catchy tune and its vicious visual mark another stunning achievement for the enigmatic entertainer who initially emerged on YouTube in a bizarre series of art videos. Apostate metalheads might want to take note."

== Accolades ==
"Bloodmoney" was nominated for Best Metal Performance at the 63rd Annual Grammy Awards, making Poppy the first female solo artist to be nominated in the category.

Accolades for "Bloodmoney"
Year	Organization	Award	Result	Ref.
2021	Grammy Awards	Best Metal Performance	Nominated	
