= V.A.N (song) =

Single by Bad Omens and Poppy

from the album Concrete Jungle [The OST]
- Released: January 25, 2024
- Genre: Metalcore; industrial metal
- Length: 4:35
- Label: Sumerian
- Songwriters: Noah Sebastian; Joakim Karlsson; Michael Taylor
- Producers: Noah Sebastian; Joakim Karlsson

Bad Omens singles chronology
"The Death of Peace of Mind" (2023)	"V.A.N" (2024)	"Novocaine" (2024)

Poppy singles chronology
"Hard" (2023)	"V.A.N" (2024)	"Suffocate" (2024)

Music video
- "V.A.N" on YouTube

"V.A.N" (an acronym for "Violence Against Nature") is a song by American heavy metal band Bad Omens, sung by American singer Poppy, from the band's reissue album Concrete Jungle [The OST] (2024). It was released by Sumerian Records on January 25, 2024, as the lead single from the album.

The song premiered on SiriusXM's Octane radio station hours before its official release.

== Background ==
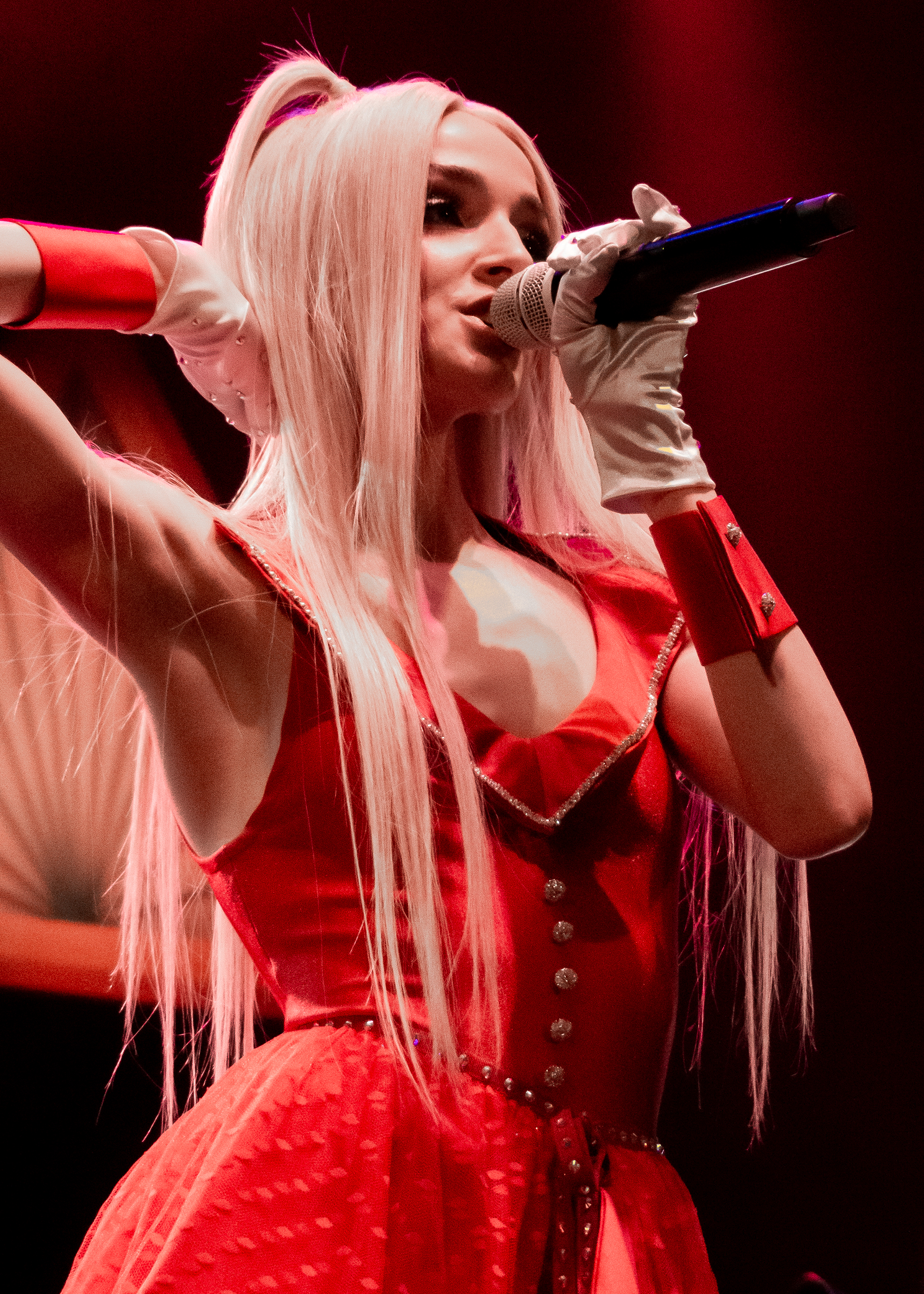
"V.A.N" was performed entirely by Poppy (pictured in 2018).

In September 2023, Poppy announced that she would be supporting Bad Omens across Europe for their Concrete Forever Tour, ahead of her own Zig Tour in support of her fifth album, Zig (2023). In January 2024, Bad Omens deleted all of their Instagram posts and began posting video teasers that featured Poppy.

== Composition ==
"V.A.N" is a metalcore and industrial metal song that features lead vocals from Poppy only. The sci-fi-themed song includes inspiration from Bad Omens' comic book Concrete Jungle. It tells a story of an artificial intelligence entity that would destroy humanity.

Speaking about the song, Sebastian elaborated:

"That's a song that started just with the hook 'Violence against nature', and then after saving the project with the acronym and seeing it we realized it could be fun to think of 'VAN' as a name. Thus the rabbit hole of ideas began that led us to decide to write lyrics from the perspective of an artificial intelligence gone rogue".

The vocal delivery of the verse was influenced by GLaDOS from the video game Portal.

== Accolades ==
Awards and nominations for "V.A.N”
Year	Award ceremony	Category	Result	Ref.
2024	Rock Sound Awards	Song of the Year	Won	
2024	Nik Nocturnal Awards	Collab Song of the Year	Nominated	

Critics' year-end rankings of "V.A.N”
Publication	List	Rank	Ref.
MetalHammer	The 50 best metal songs of 2024	10	

== Music video ==
The music video for "V.A.N" was released alongside the song, and was directed by Garrett Nicholson and Poppy. The visuals were inspired by the video game Portal, the film Ex Machina, and the TV show Stranger Things.

On March 29, 2024, an official live video was released, which features Poppy and Bad Omens performing the song in Europe.

== Live performance ==
Bad Omens and Poppy debuted the song live in Berlin on January 27, 2024.

== Charts ==
=== Weekly charts ===
Weekly chart performance for "V.A.N"
Chart (2024)	Peak position
France Digital Songs (SNEP)	71
UK Singles Downloads (OCC)	81
UK Singles Sales (OCC)	88
UK Rock & Metal (OCC)	25
US Hot Rock & Alternative Songs (Billboard)	39

=== Year-end charts ===
Year-end chart performance for "V.A.N"
Chart (2024)	Position
US Hot Hard Rock Songs (Billboard)	15
US Mainstream Rock (Billboard)	42

== Release history ==
"V.A.N" release history
Region	Date	Format(s)	Label(s)	Ref.
Various	January 25, 2024	Digital download; streaming	Sumerian	
Various	July 19, 2024	12-inch vinyl	Sumerian; M	
Various	July 22, 2024	12-inch picture disc	Sumerian; M	
