= Julian Gargiulo =

Italian-American classical pianist (born 1972)

Julian Lawrence Gargiulo
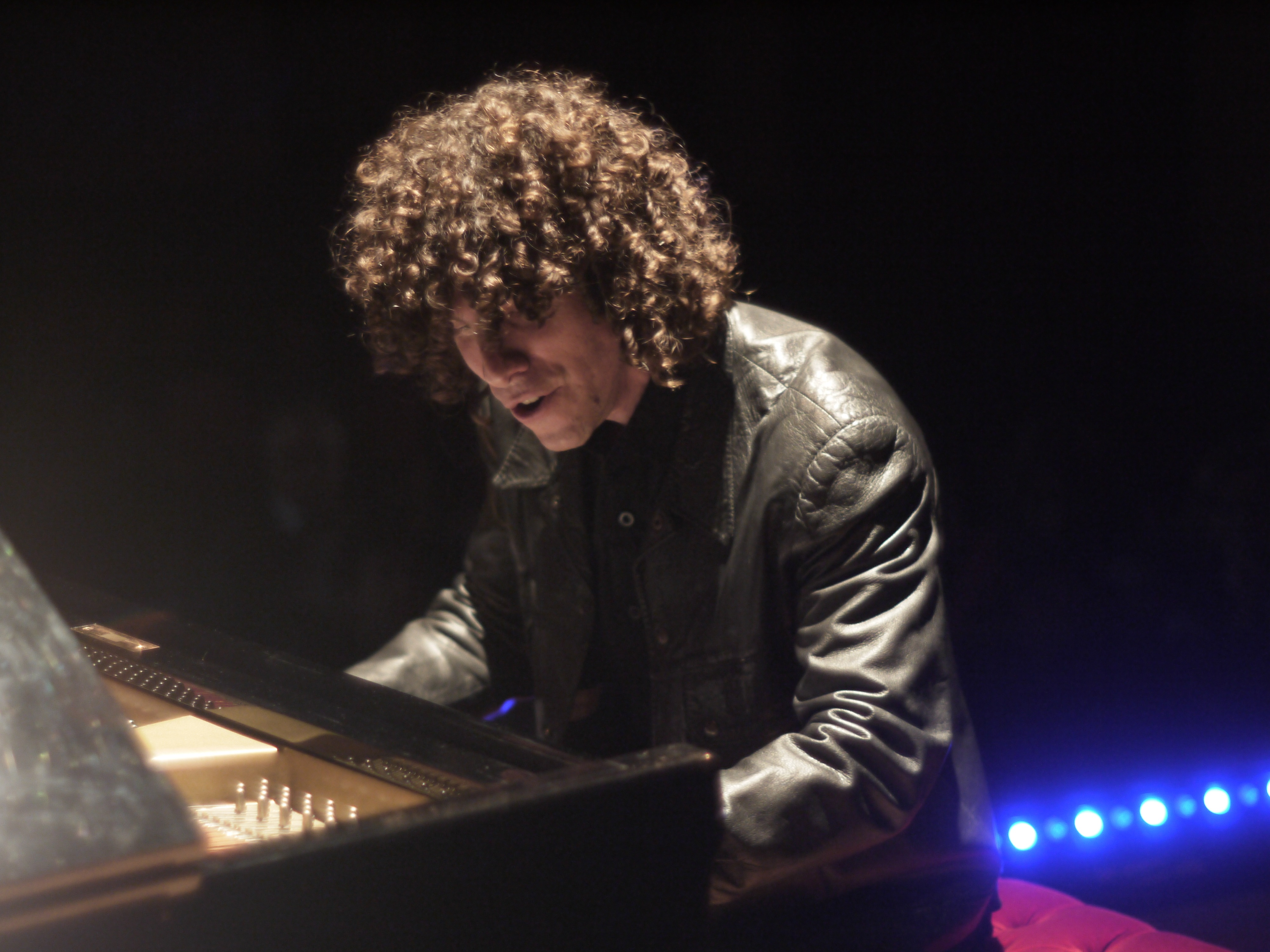

Background information
- Born: 10 November 1972 (age 53); Naples, Italy
- Genres: Classical
- Occupations: Musician, composer
- Instrument: Piano
- Website: www.pianistwiththehair.com

Julian Lawrence Gargiulo is an Italian-American concert pianist and composer. He is known for his interactive, humorous performances of classical music.

== Biography ==
Gargiulo was born in Naples, Italy. He studied at the Verona State Conservatory with Aureliana Randone, the Mugi Academy in Rome with Aldo Ciccolini, and the Moscow Conservatory with Mikhail Mezhlumov. In 1995 he moved to the United States, where he studied at Rowan University with Veda Zuponcic, at the Peabody Institute of the Johns Hopkins University with Boris Slutsky (MM), and at the University of Maryland with Santiago Rodriguez (DMA).

Dr. Gargiulo is artistic director of the Water Island Music Festival and of Getting to Carnegie, an annual competition which rotates between violin, cello and voice, and in which the audience decides the winner.

== Compositions ==
Selected Compositions
Year	Work	Movements	Notes
	Piano Sonata	1. Moderato spinto 2. Allegretto; 3. Adagietto	
2014	Violin Sonata No. 1	1. A Hat in August; 2.; 3. 4.	USA premiere at the 1st Getting to Carnegie Competition (2015) by violinists Nuné Melikian, Margarita Krein, Carter Coleman, Haeji Kim and the composer on piano at Carnegie Weill Recital Hall.
2016	Cello Sonata No. 1 "Water Island"	1. Moderato appassionato 2. Adagio; 3. Tango; 4. Vivace	
2017	Song Cycle		
2018	Violin Sonata No. 2	1. 2. 3. 4.	
	Violin Sonata No. 3	1. Maestoso; 2. Andante; 3. Intermezzo; 4. Finale	
2019	Cello Sonata No. 2	1. 2. 3. 4.	
2020	Four Ages of Love Songs		
2021	Violin Sonata No. 4 "From the Window"	1. The Ocean; 2. The Sky; 3. The Earth; 4. The People	Composed for the 7th Getting to Carnegie Competition (2021). Premiered on January 12, 2021 by violinists Sophia Stoyanovich, Angela Sin Ying Chan, Sory Park, María Dueñas Fernández and the composer on piano.
