= Never Find My Place Tour =

2022 concert tour by Poppy

- Tour by Poppy
- Location: North America; Europe
- Associated album: Flux
- Start date: March 8, 2022
- End date: November 29, 2022
- Legs: 4
- No. of shows: 40
- Supporting acts: Mz Neon; Polartropica; Band of Silver; Witch Fever

Poppy concert chronology
- I Disagree Tour (2020); Never Find My Place Tour (2022); The Godless/Goddess Tour (2023)

The Never Find My Place Tour (originally announced as the Flux Tour) was the fifth concert tour by American singer-songwriter Poppy, staged in support of her fourth studio album, Flux. The tour began on March 8, 2022, in Sacramento, California and ended prematurely on November 29, 2022, in Manchester, England after the singer announced she was too ill to perform the final Glasgow and Amsterdam shows.

== Background ==
The tour was first announced under the name "Flux Tour" and would've taken place between September 2021 and February 2022. However, days before the tour would've begun, the artist announced via Twitter that it had been cancelled due to logistical issues caused by the COVID-19 pandemic. Rescheduled dates were announced in January 2022, with the name being changed to the "Never Find My Place Tour".

In May 2022, it was announced that Poppy would be an opening act for The Smashing Pumpkins' Spirits on Fire Tour along with Jane's Addiction. Along with this, the Europe dates for the Never Find My Place Tour would be postponed as it had caused a scheduling conflict.

The show on May 26, 2022, at House of Blues San Diego was recorded and livestreamed via Veeps on a 2-hour delay.

In November 2022, weeks before the beginning of the leg, Poppy announced the cancellation of the rest of the tour's European dates via Instagram Stories, except for those in the United Kingdom and the Netherlands, citing "…the current climate of the world and the difficulty it presents to touring musicians…". (Note: Poppy said of the situation, "We have considered all options and unfortunately, we need to cancel a few European dates on the NFMP tour. This isn’t a decision that came easy – with the current climate of the world and the difficulty it presents to touring musicians it makes it nearly impossible for us in the US to get over to most of Europe.") Eventually, the Glasgow and Amsterdam dates were cancelled as well after Poppy fell ill.

== Set list ==
This is the set list for the opening night in Sacramento, California, and is not meant to represent every show of the tour. Poppy performed six songs each from Flux and I Disagree, two from Eat (NXT Soundtrack), one each from Am I a Girl?, Choke and Stagger and a cover.

1. "Lessen the Damage"
2. "X"
3. "Scary Mask"
4. "Bloodmoney"
5. "Concrete"
6. "Sit / Stay"
7. "Flux"
8. "All the Things She Said" (T.A.T.u. cover)
9. "Her"
10. "Breeders"
11. "Stagger"
12. "CUE"
13. "Anything Like Me"
14. "Hysteria"
15. "As Strange as It Seems"
16. "Never Find My Place"

Encore

17. "I Disagree"
18. "Bite Your Teeth"

== Tour dates ==
Date (2022)	City	Country	Venue	Support Act(s)
North America
March 8 (Note: The Sacramento show was originally scheduled for November 20, 2021, but was postponed due to logistical issues caused by the COVID-19 pandemic.)	Sacramento	United States	Ace of Spades	Mz Neon
March 9 (Note: The Berkeley show was originally scheduled for November 21, 2021, but was postponed due to logistical issues caused by the COVID-19 pandemic.)	Berkeley	United States	UC Theatre	Mz Neon
March 10 (Note: The Santa Ana show was originally scheduled for September 30, 2021, but was postponed due to logistical issues caused by the COVID-19 pandemic.)	Santa Ana	United States	Observatory	Mz Neon
March 12 (Note: The Santa Ana show was originally scheduled for October 3, 2021, at the El Rey Theater, but the venue and date were changed due to logistical issues caused by the COVID-19 pandemic.)	Albuquerque	United States	Sunshine Theater	Mz Neon
March 15	Salt Lake City	United States	Union Pacific Depot	Mz Neon
March 17 (Note: The Denver show was originally scheduled for November 16, 2021, but was postponed due to logistical issues caused by the COVID-19 pandemic.)	Denver	United States	Summit Music Hall	Mz Neon
March 18 (Note: The Kansas City show was originally scheduled for November 13, 2021, but was postponed due to logistical issues caused by the COVID-19 pandemic.)	Kansas City	United States	The Truman	Mz Neon
March 19 (Note: The Des Moines show was originally scheduled for November 14, 2021, but was postponed due to logistical issues caused by the COVID-19 pandemic.)	Des Moines	United States	Wooly's	Mz Neon
March 21 (Note: The Milwaukee show was originally scheduled for November 8, 2021, but was postponed due to logistical issues caused by the COVID-19 pandemic.)	Milwaukee	United States	Turner Hall	Mz Neon
March 22 (Note: The Minneapolis show was originally scheduled for November 9, 2021, but was postponed due to logistical issues caused by the COVID-19 pandemic.)	Minneapolis	United States	First Avenue	Mz Neon
March 23 (Note: The Chicago show was originally scheduled for November 11, 2021, at the Riviera Theatre, but the venue and date were changed to logistical issues caused by the COVID-19 pandemic.)	Chicago	United States	Park West	Mz Neon
March 24 (Note: The Detroit show was originally scheduled for November 1, 2021, but was postponed due to logistical issues caused by the COVID-19 pandemic. Later, the venue was moved to Pontiac's The Crofoot while the original venue, Saint Andrew's Hall, was closed for construction.)	Pontiac (Note: Promoted as Detroit)	United States	The Crofoot	Mz Neon
March 25 (Note: The Columbus show was originally scheduled for November 4, 2021, but was postponed due to logistical issues caused by the COVID-19 pandemic.)	Columbus	United States	Newport Music Hall	Mz Neon
March 28 (Note: The Toronto show was originally scheduled for October 30, 2021, but was postponed due to logistical issues caused by the COVID-19 pandemic.)	Toronto	Canada	Danforth Music Hall	Mz Neon
March 29 (Note: The Montreal show was originally scheduled for October 28, 2021, but was postponed due to logistical issues caused by the COVID-19 pandemic.)	Montreal	Canada	Corona Theatre	Mz Neon
March 30 (Note: The New York show was originally scheduled for October 26, 2021, at Terminal 5 but the date and venue were changed due to logistical issues caused by the COVID-19 pandemic.)	New York	United States	Webster Hall	Mz Neon
March 31 (Note: The Worcester show was originally scheduled for October 22, 2021, but was postponed due to logistical issues caused by the COVID-19 pandemic.)	Worcester	United States	Worcester Palladium	Mz Neon
April 1 (Note: The Hartford show was originally scheduled for October 23, 2021, but was postponed due to logistical issues caused by the COVID-19 pandemic.)	Hartford	United States	Webster Theater	Mz Neon
April 2 (Note: The Philadelphia show was originally scheduled for October 21, 2021, at The Fillmore but the date and venue were changed due to logistical issues caused by the COVID-19 pandemic.)	Philadelphia	United States	Theatre of Living Arts	Mz Neon
April 3 (Note: The Silver Spring show was originally scheduled for October 19, 2021, but was postponed due to logistical issues caused by the COVID-19 pandemic.)	Silver Spring	United States	The Fillmore Silver Spring	Mz Neon
April 5 (Note: The Nashville show was originally scheduled for October 10, 2021, but was postponed due to logistical issues caused by the COVID-19 pandemic.)	Nashville	United States	Brooklyn Bowl	Mz Neon
April 6 (Note: The Atlanta show was originally scheduled for October 9, 2021, but was postponed due to logistical issues caused by the COVID-19 pandemic.)	Atlanta	United States	Buckhead Theatre	Mz Neon
April 8	New Orleans	United States	House of Blues	Mz Neon
April 9 (Note: The Austin show was originally scheduled for October 5, 2021, but was postponed due to logistical issues caused by the COVID-19 pandemic.)	Austin	United States	Emo's	Mz Neon
April 10 (Note: The Dallas show was originally scheduled for October 6, 2021, but was postponed due to logistical issues caused by the COVID-19 pandemic.)	Dallas	United States	The Echo Lounge & Music Hall	Mz Neon
April 13 (Note: The Tempe show was originally scheduled for October 2, 2021, at the Van Buren in Phoenix but the date and venue were changed due to logistical issues caused by the COVID-19 pandemic.)	Tempe	United States	Marquee Theatre	Mz Neon
May 19	Norfolk	United States	The NorVa	—
May 20 (Note: The Charlotte show was originally scheduled for October 18, 2021, but was postponed due to logistical issues caused by the COVID-19 pandemic.)	Charlotte	United States	The Fillmore (The Underground)	—
May 21 (Note: The Columbia show was originally scheduled for October 12, 2021, but was postponed due to logistical issues caused by the COVID-19 pandemic.)	Columbia	United States	The Senate	—
May 22 (Note: The show on May 22, 2022, was part of the Welcome to Rockville festival.)	Daytona Beach	United States	Daytona International Speedway	—
May 25 (Note: The Los Angeles show was originally scheduled for November 18, 2021, but was postponed due to logistical issues caused by the COVID-19 pandemic.)	Los Angeles	United States	The Novo by Microsoft	Polartropica
May 26 (Note: The San Diego show was originally scheduled for October 1, 2021, but was postponed due to logistical issues caused by the COVID-19 pandemic.)	San Diego	United States	House of Blues	Polartropica
Europe
August 27 (Note: The show on August 27, 2022, was part of the Reading Festival.)	Reading	England	Little John's Farm	—
August 28 (Note: The show on August 28, 2022, was part of the Leeds Festival.)	Leeds	England	Bramham Park	—
North America
October 23 (Note: The shows on October 23 and 29, 2022 were part of the When We Were Young festival.)	Winchester	United States	Las Vegas Festival Grounds	—
October 29	Winchester	United States	Las Vegas Festival Grounds	—
Europe
November 26 (Note: The Bristol show was originally scheduled for January 10, 2022, at the Marble Factory but the venue and date were changed due to logistical issues caused by the COVID-19 pandemic.)	Bristol	England	SWX	Band of Silver; Witch Fever
November 27 (Note: The London show was originally scheduled for January 15, 2022, but was postponed due to logistical issues caused by the COVID-19 pandemic.)	London	England	Shepherd's Bush Empire	Band of Silver; Witch Fever
November 28 (Note: The Birmingham show was originally scheduled for January 13, 2022, but was postponed due to logistical issues caused by the COVID-19 pandemic.)	Birmingham	England	O_{2} Institute	Band of Silver; Witch Fever
November 29 (Note: The Manchester show was originally scheduled for January 14, 2022, but was postponed due to logistical issues caused by the COVID-19 pandemic.)	Manchester	England	O_{2} Ritz	Band of Silver; Witch Fever

== Cancelled shows ==
List of cancelled shows, showing the date, city, country, venue and the reason for cancellation.
Date	City	Country	Venue	Reason
October 7, 2021	Houston	United States	House of Blues	COVID-19 pandemic
October 13, 2021	Orlando	United States	House of Blues	COVID-19 pandemic
October 15, 2021	St. Petersburg	United States	Jannus Live	COVID-19 pandemic
October 16, 2021	Fort Lauderdale	United States	Revolution Live	COVID-19 pandemic
October 29, 2021	Ottawa	Canada	Bronson Centre	COVID-19 pandemic
November 2, 2021	Cleveland	United States	House of Blues	COVID-19 pandemic
November 5, 2021	Louisville	United States	Mercury Ballroom	COVID-19 pandemic
November 6, 2021	Grand Rapids	United States	Intersection	COVID-19 pandemic
November 12, 2021	Chesterfield	United States	The Factory	COVID-19 pandemic
November 24, 2021	Seattle	United States	Showbox SoDo	COVID-19 pandemic
November 26, 2021	Portland	United States	Roseland Theater	COVID-19 pandemic
January 23, 2022	Bilbao	Spain	Kafe Antzokia	COVID-19 pandemic
February 2, 2022	Bochum	Germany	Zeche Bochum	COVID-19 pandemic
May 14, 2022 (Note: The show on May 14, 2021, would've been part of We Are One Music and Arts Festival.)	Houston	United States	Eleanor Tinsley Park	Festival organizers could not "execute [their] vision to the fullest expectations"
June 30, 2022 (Note: The show on June 30, 2022, would've been part of the Roskilde Festival.)	Roskilde	Denmark	Darupvej	"The current climate of the world"
July 9, 2022 (Note: The show on July 9, 2022, would've been part of Park Live Festival.)	Moscow	Russia	Luzhniki Olympic Complex	2022 Russian invasion of Ukraine
July 11, 2022 (Note: The show on July 11, 2022, would've been part of UPark Festival.)	Kyiv	Ukraine	Sky Family Park	2022 Russian invasion of Ukraine
October 22, 2022 (Note: The show on October 22, 2022, would've been part of the When We Were Young festival.)	Winchester	United States	Las Vegas Festival Grounds	High wind warning
November 3, 2022 (Note: The Zurich show was originally scheduled for January 19, 2022, but was postponed due to logistical issues caused by the COVID-19 pandemic.)	Zürich	Switzerland	X-TRA	Scheduling conflict with the Spirits on Fire Tour
November 7, 2022 (Note: The Barcelona show was originally scheduled for January 21, 2022, at Salamandra in L'Hospitalet de Llobregat but the date and venue were changed due to logistical issues caused by the COVID-19 pandemic.)	Barcelona	Spain	Apolo 2	Scheduling conflict with the Spirits on Fire Tour
November 9, 2022 (Note: The Milan show was originally scheduled for January 25, 2022, at Alcatraz but the date and venue were changed due to logistical issues caused by the COVID-19 pandemic.)	Milan	Italy	Fabrique	Scheduling conflict with the Spirits on Fire Tour
November 13, 2022 (Note: The Budapest show was originally scheduled for February 6, 2022, but was postponed due to logistical issues caused by the COVID-19 pandemic.)	Budapest	Hungary	Akvarium	Scheduling conflict with the Spirits on Fire Tour
November 14, 2022 (Note: The Prague show was originally scheduled for February 5, 2022, but was postponed due to logistical issues caused by the COVID-19 pandemic.)	Prague	Czechia	Lucerna Music Bar	Scheduling conflict with the Spirits on Fire Tour
November 18, 2022	Copenhagen	Denmark	Amager Bio	Scheduling conflict with the Spirits on Fire Tour
November 20, 2022 (Note: The Antwerp show was originally scheduled for February 1, 2022, but was postponed due to logistical issues caused by the COVID-19 pandemic.)	Antwerp	Belgium	Zappa	Scheduling conflict with the Spirits on Fire Tour
November 30, 2022 (Note: The Glasgow show was originally scheduled for January 11, 2022, but was postponed due to logistical issues caused by the COVID-19 pandemic.)	Glasgow	Scotland	SWG3	Illness
December 2, 2022 (Note: The Amsterdam gig was previously scheduled for January 30, 2022, and November 24, 2022. The first postponement was due to the COVID-19 pandemic and the second was due to conflict with the Spirits on Fire Tour.)	Amsterdam	Netherlands	Melkweg	Illness
December 4, 2022 (Note: The Paris gig was previously scheduled for January 17, 2022, and November 2, 2022. The first postponement was due to the COVID-19 pandemic and the second was due to conflict with the Spirits on Fire Tour.)	Paris	France	Élysée Montmartre	"The current climate of the world"
December 7, 2022 (Note: The Madrid gig was previously scheduled for January 22, 2022, at Shoko and November 6, 2022, at Cool Stage. The first postponement was due to the COVID-19 pandemic and the second was due to conflict with the Spirits on Fire Tour.)	Madrid	Spain	Cool Stage	"The current climate of the world"
December 8, 2022 (Note: The Toulouse gig was originally scheduled for November 4, 2022, but was postponed due to conflict with the Spirits on Fire Tour.)	Toulouse	France	Metronum	"The current climate of the world"
December 13, 2022 (Note: The Munich gig was previously scheduled for January 26, 2022, at Technikum and November 10, 2022, at Freiheitshalle. The first postponement was due to the COVID-19 pandemic and the second was due to conflict with the Spirits on Fire Tour.)	Munich	Germany	Freiheitshalle	"The current climate of the world"
December 14, 2022 (Note: The Vienna gig was previously scheduled for February 2, 2022, and November 12, 2022. The first postponement was due to the COVID-19 pandemic and the second was due to conflict with the Spirits on Fire Tour.)	Vienna	Austria	Simm City	"The current climate of the world"
December 15, 2022 (Note: The Paris gig was previously scheduled for January 28, 2022, at Astra Kulturhaus and November 15, 2022, at Heimathafen. The first postponement was due to the COVID-19 pandemic and the second was due to conflict with the Spirits on Fire Tour.)	Berlin	Germany	Heimathafen	"The current climate of the world"
December 17, 2022 (Note: The Hanover gig was previously scheduled for February 3, 2022, and November 23, 2022. The first postponement was due to the COVID-19 pandemic and the second was due to conflict with the Spirits on Fire Tour.)	Hanover	Germany	Capitol	"The current climate of the world"
December 19, 2022 (Note: The Hamburg gig was previously scheduled for January 29, 2022, and November 16, 2022. The first postponement was due to the COVID-19 pandemic and the second was due to conflict with the Spirits on Fire Tour.)	Hamburg	Germany	Fabrik	"The current climate of the world"
December 21, 2022 (Note: The Cologne gig was originally scheduled for November 21, 2022, but was postponed due to conflict with the Spirits on Fire Tour.)	Cologne	Germany	Gloria-Theater	"The current climate of the world"
