= List of Poppy live performances =

Poppy live performances
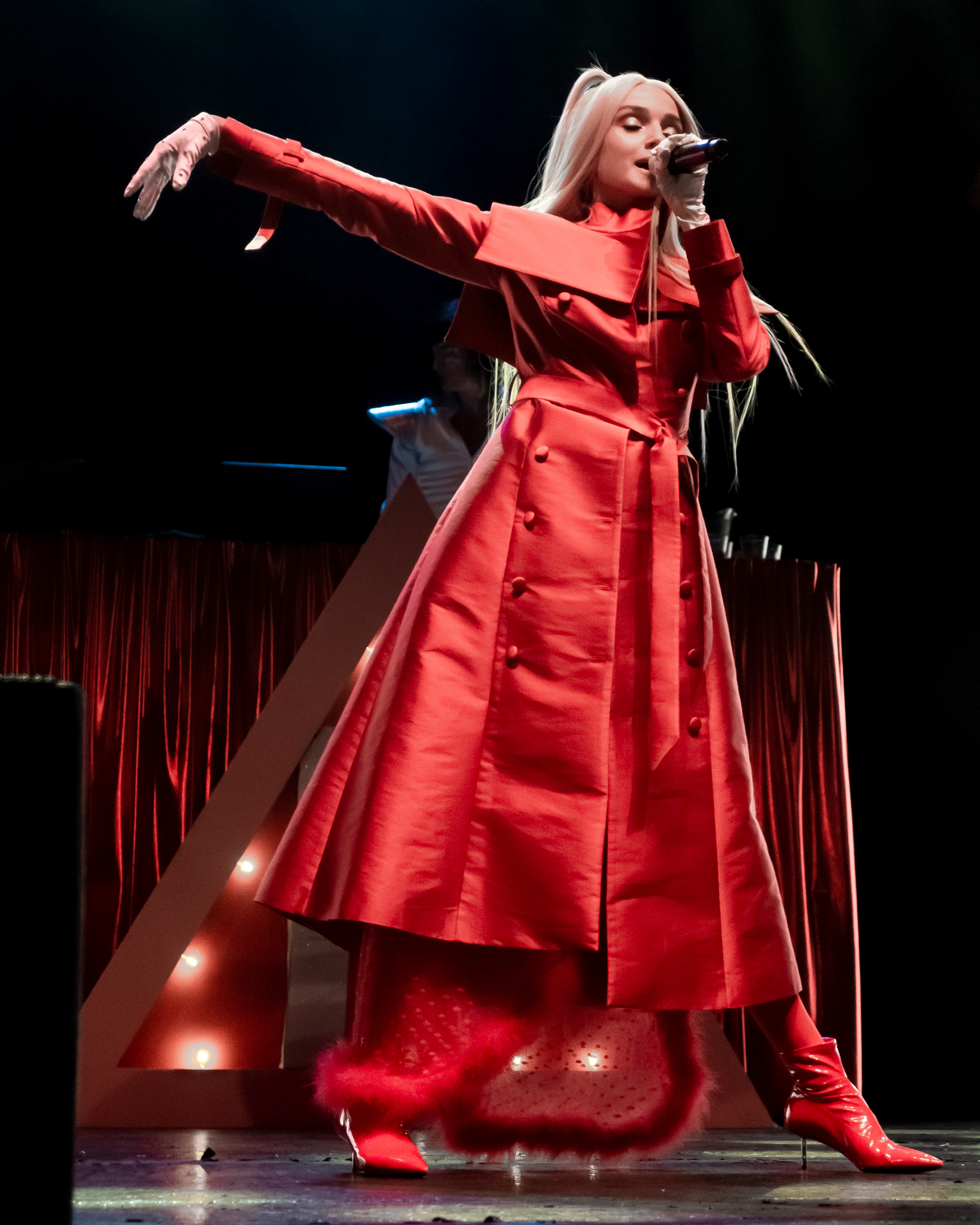
- Poppy on the Am I a Girl? Tour (2018)
- Concert tours: 7
- Music festivals: 6
- Television performances: 7
- Livestream performances: 1

Since her first performance in 2011, American singer-songwriter Poppy has headlined seven concert tours.

Poppy's first touring experience was as the opening act for Dumblonde's eponymous tour in 2015, where she performed four dates on the West Coast of the United States. Her first tour, the Poppy.Computer Tour, took place from 2017 to 2018, and consisted of 44 shows in North America, London and Japan.

Poppy began her third tour, the Am I a Girl? Tour, in 2018, where she toured mainland Europe for the first time. The tour continued with a North American leg in 2019. Later that year, Poppy co-headlined the Threesome Tour with Bring Me the Horizon and Sleeping with Sirens.

In 2020, Poppy released the I Disagree album and, in support of it, began her fifth headlining tour. Visiting only North America, the planned European dates were cancelled last-minute due to the COVID-19 pandemic. The following year, Poppy released the Flux album and announced the Flux Tour to support it. However, also due to the pandemic, the tour was postponed. When re-announced for 2022, the tour was given a new name, the Never Find My Place Tour.

In 2023, Poppy co-headlined the Godless/Goddess Tour with American pop rock band Pvris. In 2024, she opened for Bad Omens in Europe during their Concrete Forever tour. After this, she will begin her headlining Zig Tour in the United Kingdom.

== Tours ==
=== Headlining ===
Title	First date	Last date	Associated album	Continent(s)	Opening acts
Poppy.Computer Tour	October 19, 2017	April 27, 2018	Poppy.Computer	Asia, Europe, North America	Charlotte (Note: Charlotte is a mannequin character who appears in some of Poppy's videos, using text-to-speech as vocals. The mannequin is often put on stage to "perform" a DJ set in place of an opening act.)
Am I a Girl? Tour	September 22, 2018	February 27, 2019	Am I a Girl?	Europe, North America	Amable, Aviva, Jane Ellen Bryant, Charlotte, Flint Eastwood, Eldren, Legoteque, Lev, Kailee Morgue, Siria Dj, YaSi
I Disagree Tour	January 22, 2020	February 21, 2020	I Disagree	North America	Vows
Never Find My Place Tour	March 8, 2022	November 29, 2022	Flux	Europe, North America	Band of Silver, Mz Neon, Polartropica, Witch Fever
Zig Tour	February 14, 2024	February 21, 2024	Zig	Europe	Wargasm

=== Co-headlining ===
Title	Co-headlining artist	First date	Last date	Associated EP	Continent	Opening acts
Threesome Tour	Bring Me the Horizon, Sleeping with Sirens	October 10, 2019	October 29, 2019	Choke	North America	—N/a
The Godless/Goddess Tour	Pvris	August 18, 2023	September 15, 2023	Stagger	North America	Tommy Genesis, Pom Pom Squad

=== Supporting ===
Title	Headlining artist	First opening date	Last opening date	Continent
Dumblonde Tour	Dumblonde	December 2, 2015	December 6, 2015	North America
Spirits on Fire Tour	The Smashing Pumpkins	October 2, 2022	November 19, 2022	North America
Concrete Forever	Bad Omens	January 27, 2024	February 11, 2024	Europe
The Seasons Tour	30 Seconds To Mars	July 26, 2024	September 4, 2024	North America

== Am I a Girl? Tour ==
Am I a Girl? Tour
- Tour by Poppy
- Associated album: Am I a Girl?
- Start date: September 23, 2018
- End date: February 27, 2019
- No. of shows: 33

The Am I a Girl? Tour was the second concert tour by Poppy, in support of her second studio album Am I a Girl?. The tour began on September 23, 2018 (Note: The opening Barcelona show was marketed as September 22, 2018, but actually began after midnight, making it September 23.) in Barcelona and concluded on February 27, 2019, in San Diego.

The North American leg of the tour was originally scheduled for late 2018, but was postponed to early 2019 due to "delays out of [her] control with the new album". To thank her fans for waiting, she released the single "Immature Couture".

=== Shows ===
Date	City	Country	Venue	Opening act(s)
Leg 1 – Europe
September 23, 2018	Barcelona	Spain	Razzmatazz	Amable; Legoteque; Siria Dj
September 23, 2018	Brussels	Belgium	Le Botanique	Charlotte
September 24, 2018	Amsterdam	Netherlands	Bitterzoet	Charlotte
September 25, 2018	Paris	France	Les Étoiles	Charlotte
September 27, 2018	Berlin	Germany	Badehaus Szimpla	Charlotte
September 28, 2018	Copenhagen	Denmark	DR Koncerthuset	Charlotte
September 29, 2018	Stockholm	Sweden	Obaren	Charlotte
October 1, 2018	Warsaw	Poland	Proxima	Charlotte
October 3, 2018	Istanbul	Türkiye	Babylon Istanbul	Charlotte
October 5, 2018	London	England	Scala	Charlotte
October 6, 2018	Manchester	England	Club Academy	Charlotte
Leg 2 – North America
October 28, 2018 (Note: The show on October 28, 2018 was part of Voodoo Music + Arts Experience.)	New Orleans	United States	City Park	—N/a
October 31, 2018	Los Angeles	United States	The Wiltern	Charlotte (Note: Charlotte the Mannequin replaces Jaira Burns as an opening act, after she pulled out due to unknown reasons.); Kailee Morgue
January 31, 2019 (Note: The show on January 31, 2019 was originally scheduled for November 24, 2018.)	Washington, D.C.	United States	9:30 Club	Flint Eastwood
February 1, 2019 (Note: The show on February 1, 2019 was originally scheduled for November 23, 2018.)	Philadelphia	United States	Theatre of Living Arts	Flint Eastwood
February 2, 2019 (Note: The show on February 2, 2019 was originally scheduled for November 20, 2018.)	New York City	United States	Irving Plaza	Flint Eastwood
February 4, 2019 (Note: The show on February 4, 2019 was originally scheduled for November 19, 2018.)	Boston	United States	House of Blues	Flint Eastwood
February 6, 2019 (Note: The show on February 6, 2019 was originally scheduled for November 17, 2018.)	Toronto	Canada	Danforth Music Hall	Flint Eastwood
February 7, 2019 (Note: The show on February 7, 2019 was originally scheduled for November 16, 2018.)	Detroit	United States	Saint Andrew's Hall	Flint Eastwood
February 8, 2019 (Note: The show on February 8, 2019 was originally scheduled for November 14, 2018.)	Chicago	United States	House of Blues	Flint Eastwood
February 9, 2019	Pittsburgh	United States	Stage AE	Flint Eastwood
February 11, 2019 (Note: The show on February 11, 2019 was originally scheduled for November 13, 2018.)	Nashville	United States	Cannery Ballroom	Flint Eastwood
February 12, 2019 (Note: The show on February 12, 2019 was originally scheduled for November 10, 2018.)	Atlanta	United States	Buckhead Theatre	Flint Eastwood
February 13, 2019 (Note: The show on February 13, 2019 was originally scheduled for November 9, 2018.)	University (Note: Promoted as Tampa Bay)	United States	The Orpheum	The Pauses
February 15, 2019 (Note: The show on February 15, 2019 was originally scheduled for November 6, 2018.)	Dallas	United States	House of Blues	Lev
February 16, 2019 (Note: The show on February 16, 2019 was originally scheduled for November 7, 2018.)	Austin	United States	Emo's	Jane Ellen Bryant
February 18, 2019	Aspen	United States	Belly Up	Eldren
February 19, 2019 (Note: The show on February 19, 2019 was originally scheduled for November 3, 2018.)	Englewood	United States	Gothic Theatre	YaSi
February 21, 2019 (Note: The show on February 21, 2019 was originally scheduled for October 26, 2018.)	Seattle	United States	The Showbox	Aviva
February 22, 2019 (Note: The show on February 22, 2019 was originally scheduled for October 25, 2018.)	Portland	United States	Wonder Ballroom	Aviva
February 23, 2019	Chico	United States	Senator Theatre	Aviva
February 24, 2019 (Note: The show on February 24, 2019 was originally scheduled for October 30, 2018.)	San Francisco	United States	Regency Ballroom	Aviva
February 27, 2019 (Note: The show on February 27, 2019 was originally scheduled for November 1, 2018.)	San Diego	United States	House of Blues	Aviva

== Threesome Tour ==
Threesome Tour
- Tour by Bring Me the Horizon, Poppy and Sleeping with Sirens
- Associated album: Amo; Choke; How It Feels to Be Lost
- Start date: October 10, 2019
- End date: October 29, 2019
- No. of shows: 10

The Threesome Tour was a co-headlining tour by British band Bring Me the Horizon, American singer Poppy and American band Sleeping with Sirens. The tour took place in the United States in October 2019, and supported their projects Amo, Choke, and How It Feels to Be Lost, respectively.

During the tour, Bring Me the Horizon performed at two festivals without Poppy and Sleeping with Sirens. On one of these dates, the two performed their own co-headlining show in Vancouver that was not included as part of the tour.

=== Shows ===
Date	City	U.S. state	Venue
October 10	Phoenix	Arizona	Comerica Theatre
October 14	Portland	Oregon	Theater of the Clouds
October 16	Seattle	Washington	WaMu Theater
October 18 (Note: The show on October 18, 2019 was part of the Las Rageous Festival.)	Las Vegas	Nevada	Downtown Las Vegas Events Center
October 19	San Diego	California	Viejas Arena
October 21	Oklahoma City	Oklahoma	The Criterion
October 22	Kansas City	Missouri	Arvest Bank Theatre at The Midland
October 25	San Antonio	Texas	Sunken Gardens Theatre
October 28	Tampa	Florida	Cuban Club Courtyard
October 29	Miami Beach (Note: Promoted as Miami)	Florida	The Fillmore Miami Beach at Jackie Gleason Theater

== I Disagree Tour ==
I Disagree Tour
- Tour by Poppy
- Associated album: I Disagree
- Start date: January 22, 2020
- End date: February 21, 2020
- No. of shows: 22

I Disagree was the fourth headlining tour by Poppy, in support of her third studio album, I Disagree. The tour began on January 22, 2020, in San Francisco and ended on February 21 in Los Angeles.

An additional European leg was scheduled to begin on March 12, 2020, and end on March 30, but it was cancelled due to the COVID-19 pandemic. Poppy also revealed that the tour would have visited Australia, making it her first headlining tour in the country, but these dates were never announced, likely also cancelled by the pandemic.

Prior to the beginning of the tour, Poppy performed four shows in Australia for the Good Things festival.

=== Shows ===
Date (2020)	City	Country	Venue	Opening act
January 22	San Francisco	United States	Great American Music Hall	Vows
January 24	Portland	United States	Hawthorne Theatre	Vows
January 25	Seattle	United States	Neptune Theatre	Vows
January 27	Salt Lake City	United States	The Complex	Vows
January 28	Denver	United States	Gothic Theatre	Vows
January 30	Saint Paul	United States	Amsterdam Bar and Hall	Vows
January 31	Chicago	United States	The Vic Theatre	Vows
February 1	Detroit	United States	Majestic Theatre	Vows
February 2	Toronto	Canada	The Opera House	Vows
February 4	Boston	United States	Brighton Music Hall	Vows
February 5	Boston	United States	Brighton Music Hall	Vows
February 6	New York City	United States	Brooklyn Steel	Vows
February 7	Philadelphia	United States	Theatre of Living Arts	Vows
February 8	Washington, D.C.	United States	U Street Music Hall	Vows
February 10	Charlotte	United States	The Underground	Vows
February 12	Tampa	United States	The Orpheum	Vows
February 14	Atlanta	United States	The Loft at Center Stage	Vows
February 15	St. Louis	United States	Delmar Hall	Vows
February 17	Lawrence	United States	Liberty Hall	Vows
February 19	Albuquerque	United States	Sunshine Theater	Vows
February 20	Phoenix	United States	The Pressroom	Vows
February 21	Los Angeles	United States	The Fonda Theatre	Vows

=== Cancelled shows ===
Date (2020)	City	Country	Venue	Reason
March 12	Manchester	England	Manchester Academy 2	COVID-19 pandemic
March 13	Glasgow	Scotland	Glasgow Cathouse	COVID-19 pandemic
March 14	Birmingham	England	O_{2} Academy	COVID-19 pandemic
March 15	London	England	Heaven	COVID-19 pandemic
March 17	Amsterdam	Netherlands	Melkweg	COVID-19 pandemic
March 18	Brussels	Belgium	Orangery	COVID-19 pandemic
March 20	Paris	France	Trabendo	COVID-19 pandemic
March 21	Bochum	Germany	Zeche Bochum	COVID-19 pandemic
March 22	Berlin	Germany	Columbia Theatre	COVID-19 pandemic
March 24	Munich	Germany	Backstage Halle	COVID-19 pandemic
March 25	Milan	Italy	Santeria Toscana 31	COVID-19 pandemic
March 26	Vienna	Austria	Flex	COVID-19 pandemic
March 27	Zürich	Switzerland	Plaza	COVID-19 pandemic
March 29	Barcelona	Spain	Razzmatazz	COVID-19 pandemic
March 30	Madrid	Spain	Sala Caracol	COVID-19 pandemic

== The Godless/Goddess Tour ==
The Goddess/Godless Tour
- Tour by Poppy and Pvris
- Associated album: Evergreen; Stagger
- Start date: August 18, 2023
- End date: September 15, 2023
- No. of shows: 19

The Godless/Goddess Tour was a co-headlining concert tour by Poppy and Pvris. The tour visited 19 cities in North America in 2023, with Tommy Genesis and Pom Pom Squad as support, beginning August 18 in Seattle and concluding September 15 in Toronto.

On September 8, 2023, Poppy headlined her own show at the Vic Theatre, called Godless in Chicago. Though Pvris did not appear, it was still considered part of the tour.

=== Shows ===
Date (2023)	City	Country	Venue	Opening act
August 18	Seattle	United States	Showbox SoDo	Tommy Genesis
August 19	Portland	United States	Roseland Theater	Tommy Genesis
August 22	San Francisco	United States	Regency Ballroom	Tommy Genesis
August 24	Los Angeles	United States	The Wiltern	Tommy Genesis
August 25	Tempe	United States	Marquee Theatre	Tommy Genesis
August 26	Paradise (Note: Promoted as Las Vegas)	United States	Brooklyn Bowl	Tommy Genesis
August 28	Salt Lake City	United States	The Complex	Tommy Genesis
August 29	Denver	United States	Ogden Theatre	Tommy Genesis
September 1	San Antonio	United States	Aztec Theatre	Tommy Genesis
September 2	Houston	United States	House of Blues	Pom Pom Squad
September 3	Oklahoma City	United States	Tower Theatre	Pom Pom Squad
September 6	Kansas City	United States	The Truman	Pom Pom Squad
September 7	Minneapolis	United States	First Avenue	Pom Pom Squad
September 8 (Note: The show on September 8 was called Godless in Chicago. Pvris did not perform, Poppy is the sole headliner.)	Chicago	United States	The Vic Theatre	Pom Pom Squad
September 9	St. Louis	United States	The Pageant	Pom Pom Squad
September 10	Columbus	United States	KEMBA Live!	Pom Pom Squad
September 13	McKees Rocks (Note: Promoted as Pittsburgh)	United States	Roxian Theatre	Pom Pom Squad
September 14	Cleveland	United States	House of Blues	Pom Pom Squad
September 15	Toronto	Canada	History	Pom Pom Squad

== Zig Tour ==
Zig Tour
- Tour by Poppy
- Associated album: Zig
- Start date: February 14, 2024
- End date: February 21, 2024
- No. of shows: 7

The Zig Tour was the seventh concert tour by Poppy, which supported her fifth studio album, Zig (2023). As of September 2023.

Prior to the tour, Poppy appeared as an opening act for the European leg of Bad Omens' Concrete Forever tour.

=== Shows ===
Date (2024)	City	Country	Venue	Opening act
February 14	Manchester	England	Manchester Academy	Wargasm
February 15	Glasgow	Scotland	Barrowland Ballroom	Wargasm
February 16	Liverpool	England	O_{2} Academy Liverpool	Wargasm
February 18	Bristol	England	O_{2} Academy Bristol	Wargasm
February 19	Birmingham	England	O_{2} Academy Birmingham	Wargasm
February 20	London	England	KOKO	Wargasm
February 21	London	England	KOKO	Wargasm

== Broadcast performances ==
Date	Program	City	Country	Ref.
July 28, 2017	The Late Late Show with James Corden	Los Angeles	United States	
September 10, 2018	The Late Late Show with James Corden	Los Angeles	United States	
October 30, 2019	WWE NXT	Winter Park	United States	
February 16, 2020	NXT TakeOver: Portland	Portland	United States	
October 28, 2020	NXT Halloween Havoc	Orlando	United States	
March 14, 2021	63rd Annual Grammy Awards premiere ceremony	Los Angeles	United States	
April 8, 2021	NXT TakeOver: Stand & Deliver	Orlando	United States	
April 24, 2021	The Last Disagreement	Unknown		
November 26, 2024	Jimmy Kimmel Live!	Hollywood	United States	
February 7, 2025	Like a Version	Sydney	Australia	

== As opening act ==
=== Dumblonde Tour ===
Date (2015)	Headlining artist	City	Country	Venue	Ref.
December 2	Dumblonde	Anaheim	United States	House of Blues	
December 3	Dumblonde	San Francisco	United States	Social Hall SF	
December 5	Dumblonde	Seattle	United States	Neumos	
December 6	Dumblonde	Portland	United States	Holocene	

=== Spirits on Fire Tour ===
Date (2022)	Headlining artist	City	Country	Venue
October 2	The Smashing Pumpkins	Dallas	United States	American Airlines Center
October 3	The Smashing Pumpkins	Houston	United States	Toyota Center
October 5	The Smashing Pumpkins	Austin	United States	Moody Center
October 7	The Smashing Pumpkins	Tampa	United States	Amalie Arena
October 8	The Smashing Pumpkins	Hollywood	United States	Hard Rock Live
October 10	The Smashing Pumpkins	Nashville	United States	Bridgestone Arena
October 11	The Smashing Pumpkins	Atlanta	United States	State Farm Arena
October 13	The Smashing Pumpkins	Montville	United States	Mohegan Sun Arena
October 14	The Smashing Pumpkins	Elmont	United States	UBS Arena
October 16	The Smashing Pumpkins	Boston	United States	TD Garden
October 18	The Smashing Pumpkins	Washington, D.C.	United States	Capital One Arena
October 19	The Smashing Pumpkins	New York City	United States	Madison Square Garden
October 21	The Smashing Pumpkins	Philadelphia	United States	Wells Fargo Center
October 24	The Smashing Pumpkins	Toronto	Canada	Scotiabank Arena
October 26	The Smashing Pumpkins	Montreal	Canada	Bell Centre
October 27	The Smashing Pumpkins	Quebec City	Canada	Videotron Centre
October 30	The Smashing Pumpkins	Milwaukee	United States	Fiserv Forum
November 1	The Smashing Pumpkins	St. Louis	United States	Enterprise Center
November 2	The Smashing Pumpkins	Detroit	United States	Little Caesars Arena
November 4	The Smashing Pumpkins	Saint Paul	United States	Xcel Energy Center
November 5	The Smashing Pumpkins	Chicago	United States	United Center
November 7	The Smashing Pumpkins	Denver	United States	Ball Arena
November 9	The Smashing Pumpkins	Spokane	United States	Spokane Arena
November 11	The Smashing Pumpkins	Vancouver	Canada	Rogers Arena
November 12	The Smashing Pumpkins	Seattle	United States	Climate Pledge Arena
November 15	The Smashing Pumpkins	San Francisco	United States	Chase Center
November 16	The Smashing Pumpkins	Anaheim	United States	Honda Center
November 18	The Smashing Pumpkins	Phoenix	United States	Footprint Center
November 19	The Smashing Pumpkins	Los Angeles	United States	Hollywood Bowl

=== Concrete Forever ===
Date (2024)	Headlining artist	City	Country	Venue
January 27	Bad Omens	Berlin	Germany	Columbiahalle
January 28	Bad Omens	Cologne	Germany	Palladium
January 29	Bad Omens	Cologne	Germany	Palladium
January 30	Bad Omens	Munich	Germany	Zenith
February 1	Bad Omens	Zürich	Switzerland	Halle 622
February 2	Bad Omens	Offenbach am Main	Germany	Stadthalle
February 4	Bad Omens	Tilburg	Netherlands	013
February 5	Bad Omens	Brussels	Belgium	Ancienne Belgique
February 6	Bad Omens	Paris	France	Salle Pleyel
February 8	Bad Omens	Dresden	Germany	Messe
February 9	Bad Omens	Prague	Czechia	SaSaZu
February 10	Bad Omens	Innsbruck	Austria	Congress
February 11	Bad Omens	Milan	Italy	Alcatraz

== Other performances ==
Date	Event	City	Country	Venue	Ref.
October 17, 2015	Beautycon	New York City	United States	Pier 36	
November 22, 2015	Corona Capital	Mexico City	Mexico	Autódromo Hermanos Rodríguez	
November 28, 2015	—N/a	Lyon	France	Interface Club	
January 15, 2016	—N/a	Berlin	Germany	Køpi	
January 16, 2016	—N/a	Los Angeles	United States	Bootleg Theater	
March 10, 2016	TigerHeat club night	Los Angeles	United States	Avalon Hollywood	
March 16, 2016	South by Southwest	Austin	United States	Antone's	
May 7, 2016	Hits96's Running of the Chihuahuas	Chattanooga	United States	First Tennessee Pavilion	
May 9, 2016 (Note: The show on May 9, 2016 was originally scheduled for April 12, 2016.)	Island Life	Los Angeles	United States	The Fonda Theatre	
May 20, 2016	—N/a	Denver	United States	Bluebird Theater	
July 30, 2016	Dubuque County Fair	Dubuque	United States	Dubuque County Fairgrounds & Event Center	
October 6, 2017	—N/a	Los Angeles	United States	YouTube Space	
September 14, 2018	Westward Music Festival	Vancouver	Canada	Vogue Theatre	
May 31, 2019	Bunbury Music Festival	Cincinnati	United States	Yeatman's Cove	
June 8, 2019	Festival Diversa	Mexico City	Mexico	El Plaza Condesa	
June 23, 2019	Wynwood Pride	Miami	United States	Wynwood Marketplace	
June 29, 2019	LadyLand	New York	United States	Brooklyn Mirage	
July 18, 2019	Graphic Novel Premiere Concert	San Diego	United States	The Quartyard	
August 18, 2019	Pukkelpop	Kiewit	Belgium	Kempische Steenweg	
August 19, 2019	—N/a	London	England	Omeara	
August 24, 2019	Reading Festival	Reading	England	Little John's Farm	
August 25, 2019	Leeds Festival	Leeds	England	Bramham Park	
October 15, 2019	—N/a (Note: Co-headlining show with Sleeping with Sirens during (but not part of) the Threesome Tour while Bring Me the Horizon were busy performing at a festival.)	Vancouver	Canada	Vogue Theatre	
October 31, 2019	Ghouls to the Front	London	England	Shacklewell Arms	
November 1, 2019	—N/a	Houston	United States	Warehouse Live	
November 2, 2019	—N/a	Dallas	United States	Trees	
December 4, 2019	Good Things sideshow	Melbourne	Australia	Stay Gold	
December 6, 2019	Good Things	Melbourne	Australia	Flemington Racecourse	
December 7, 2019	Good Things	Sydney	Australia	Centennial Park	
December 8, 2019	Good Things	Brisbane	Australia	Brisbane Showgrounds	
September 29, 2021	Flux album release shows	Los Angeles	United States	Lodge Room	
October 1, 2021	Flux album release shows	Nashville	United States	Third Man Records	
November 4, 2023	Hell and Heaven	Toluca	Mexico	Foro Pegaso	
