= Slushii discography =

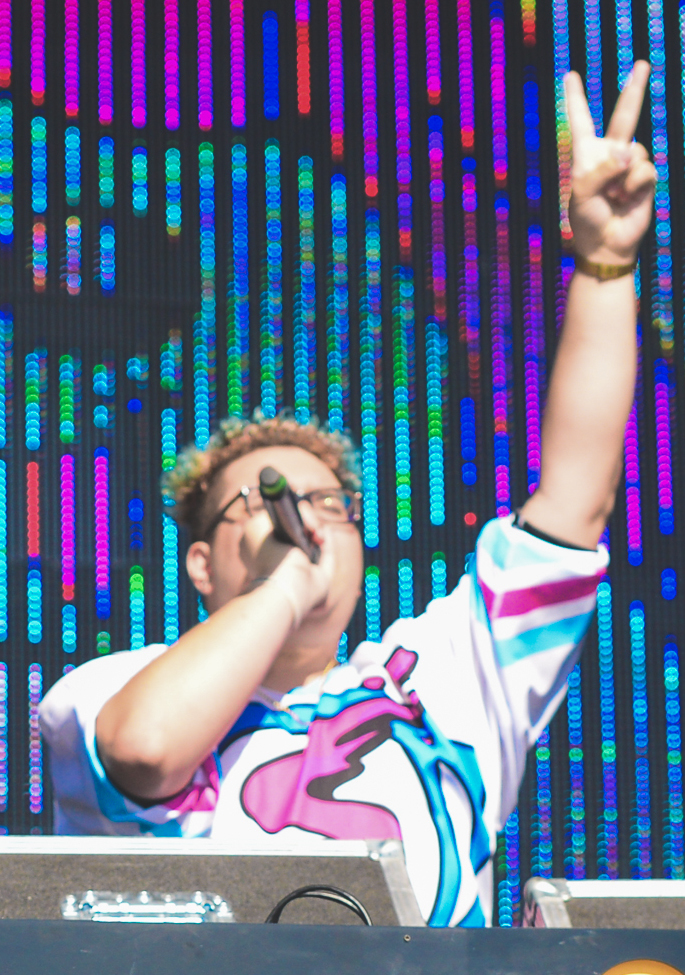
- Slushii performing at the Mad Decent Block Party
- Studio albums: 4
- EPs: 3
- Singles: 16
- Music videos: 3
- Remixes: 30

The discography of American electronic dance music producer and DJ Slushii consists of four studio albums, three extended plays, sixteen singles, thirty remixes and three music videos.

== Studio albums ==
Title	Details
Out of Light	Released: August 4, 2017; Label: Self-released; Formats: Digital download, streaming
Dream (as sapientdream)	Released: December 14, 2018; Label: Self-released; Formats: Digital download, streaming
Dream II (as sapientdream)	Released: November 22, 2019; Label: Self-released; Formats: Digital download, streaming
Dream III (as both Slushii and sapientdream)	Release: September 18, 2020; Label: Self-released; Formats: Digital download, streaming
E.L.E (Extinction Level Event)	Released: March 3, 2022; Label: Monstercat; Formats: Digital download, streaming
A Slushii Summer	Released: September 23, 2022; Label: Dim Mak Records; Formats: Digital download, streaming

== Extended plays ==
Title	Details
Brain Freeze	Released: May 20, 2016; Label: Slushii; Format: Digital download
Find Your Wings	Released: March 30, 2018; Label: Slushii; Format: Digital download, streaming
Watch Yo Back	Released: October 17, 2019; Label: Monstercat; Format: Digital download, streaming

== Singles ==
=== As lead artist ===
List of singles as lead artist, with selected chart positions, showing year released and album name
Single	Year	Peak chart positions		Album
Single	Year	US Dance	US Digital	Album
"All I've Ever Wanted"	2016	—	—	Non-album singles
"Emptiness"	2016	—	—	Non-album singles
"So Long" (featuring Madi)	2016	39	22	Non-album singles
"To Say Goodbye"	2016	—	—	Non-album singles
"Morphine"	2016	—	—	Non-album singles
"I Still Recall"	2017	—	—	Out of Light
"Dear Me"	2017	—	—	Out of Light
"Catch Me"	2017	—	—	Non-album singles
"Twinbow" (with Marshmello)	2017	—	—	Non-album singles
"Luv U Need U"	2017	—	—	Rocket League x Monstercat Vol. 1
"Step by Step"	2017	—	—	Out of Light
"By My Side (D-Sab Remix)" (with Ookay)	2017	—	—	Non-album single
"My Senses"	2017	—	—	Out of Light
"Level Up"	2017	—	—	Find Your Wings
"There x2" (featuring Marshmello)	2018	31	—	Non-album single
"Where I'm At"	2018	—	—	Find Your Wings
"Want You To Know"	2018	—	—	Non-album singles
"Through The Night" (featuring Hatsune Miku)	2018	—	—	Non-album singles
"Without You"	2018	—	—	Non-album singles
"On My Own"	2018	—	—	Non-album singles
"Find"	2018	—	—	Dream
"Never Let You Go" (featuring Sofía Reyes)	2019	—	—	Non-album singles
"Self Destruct"	2019	—	—	Non-album singles
"Dreaming of You"	2019	—	—	Non-album singles
"Far Away"	2019	—	—	Non-album singles
"Watch Yo Back"	2019	—	—	Watch Yo Back
"Calling Out to You" (featuring Miku Nakamura)	2019	—	—	Non-album singles
"Sober" (with Kaivon)	2019	—	—	Non-album singles
"Candy Flip"	2020	—	—	Non-album singles
"All Night Long" (with Holly)	2020	—	—	Non-album singles
"One True Love" (with Steve Aoki)	2020	—	—	Neon Future IV
"BEWM" (with Tokyo Machine)	2020	—	—	Non-album singles
"ET" (with RayRay)	2020	—	—	Non-album singles
"All I Need"	2020	33	—	E.L.E (Extinction Level Event)
"Just a Memory" (with Volt)	2021	—	—	Non-album single
"Valhalla"	2021	—	—	E.L.E (Extinction Level Event)
"Turn It Up"	2021	—	—	E.L.E (Extinction Level Event)
"After Midnight" (featuring Mackenzie Sol)	2022	—	—	E.L.E (Extinction Level Event)
"Pew Pew" (with Tokyo Machine)	2022	—	—	Non-album singles
"Don't Call Me" (with Leah Kate)	2023	—	—	Non-album singles
"—" denotes a recording that did not chart or was not released in that territory.

=== As featured artist ===
Title	Year
I Hold Still (Jauz and Crankdat featuring Slushii)	2017

== Remixes ==
List of remixes, showing original artists and year released
Title	Original Artists	Year
"Shots Fired" (Slushii Remix)	Sideproject and Eh!de	2015
"Where Are Ü Now"	Jack Ü (featuring Justin Bieber)	2015
"Ring of Fortune"	Eri Sasaki	2015
"Disarm You" (Slushii Remix)	Kaskade	2016
"In My Head" (Slushii Remix)	Galantis	2016
"Trust Me" (Slushii Remix)	Yuya Matsushita	2016
"Deeper Love" (Slushii Remix)	Botnek and I See Monstas	2016
"Want U 2" (Marshmello and Slushii Remix)	Marshmello	2016
"I Want You to Know" (Slushii Remix)	Zedd (featuring Selena Gomez)	2016
"Fade" (Slushii Remix)	Adventure Club	2016
"Summit" (Slushii and Ookay Remix)	Skrillex (featuring Ellie Goulding)	2016
"Uber Everywhere" (Slushii Remix)	MadeinTYO	2016
"Never Forget You" (Slushii Remix)	Zara Larsson and MNEK	2016
"Lowlife" (Slushii Remix)	Poppy	2016
"Killa" (Slushii Remix)	Wiwek and Skrillex (featuring Elliphant)	2016
"Hotline Bling" (Slushii Remix)	Drake	2016
"Ring of Fortune" (Slushii Remix)	Eri Sasaki	2016
"Thief" (Slushii Remix)	Ookay	2016
"Faded" (Slushii Remix)	Alan Walker	2016
"Alone" (Slushii Remix)	Marshmello	2016
"Closer" (Slushii Remix)	The Chainsmokers (featuring Halsey)	2016
"Bad Man" (Skrillex Remix; Slushii Edit)	Ragga Twins	2016
"Untamed Hearts" (Slushii Remix)	Ashley Apollodor	2016
"Jotaro" (Slushii Remix)	Phiso	2016
"Mind" (Slushii Remix)	Jack Ü (featuring Kai)	2016
"Side to Side" (Slushii Remix)	Ariana Grande (featuring Nicki Minaj)	2017
"Unforgettable" (Slushii Remix)	French Montana (featuring Swae Lee)	2017
"Silence" (Slushii Remix)	Marshmello (featuring Khalid)	2017
"What Lovers Do" (Slushii Remix)	Maroon 5 (featuring SZA)	2017
"Mic Drop" (Slushii Remix)	BTS	2017
"The Way I Am" (Slushii Remix)	Charlie Puth	2018
"Waste It on Me" (Slushii Remix)	Steve Aoki (featuring BTS)	2018
"Never Let You Go" (Slushii VIP)	Slushii featuring Sofia Reyes	2019
"One Thought Away" (Slushii Remix)	Asher Angel featuring Wiz Khalifa	2019
"All I Need" (VIP)	Slushii	2021
first death (Slushii Remix)	TK from Ling tosite sigure	2022

== Music videos ==
List of music videos as lead artist, showing year released, directors, producers and references
Title	Year	Director/Producer	Ref
"So Long" (featuring Madi)	2016	Karam Gill	
"I Still Recall"	2017	Bryce Morgan	
"Never Let You Go" (featuring Sofia Reyes)	2019	Meg Gamez	
