= Zig (album) =

Studio album by Poppy
- Released: October 27, 2023
- Recorded: February 2022–March 2023
- Genres: Dark pop; industrial-pop; electropop; alternative pop; electronica
- Length: 30:29
- Label: Sumerian
- Producer: Ali Payami

Poppy chronology
Stagger (2022)	Zig (2023)	Negative Spaces (2024)

Singles from Zig
- 1. "Church Outfit" Released: April 4, 2023; 2. "Knockoff" Released: July 19, 2023; 3. "Motorbike" Released: September 12, 2023; 4. "Hard" Released: October 20, 2023

Zig is the fifth studio album by American singer-songwriter Poppy. It was released on October 27, 2023, through Sumerian Records, marking her return to the label after briefly signing with Republic Records. Produced primarily by Swedish musician Ali Payami, the record marks the artist's return to pop music, and features a more industrial sound than her previous album, Flux (2021).

== Background and release ==
In 2022, Poppy signed a brief record deal with Republic Records and Lava Records to release her fifth extended play (EP), Stagger, on October 14. In a December 2022 interview with Revolver, Poppy revealed that she was working on her fifth studio album. That same month, she wiped her Instagram account clean to share a teaser for new music. The clip marked a return to her signature blonde hair after a period of having black hairstyle following the I Disagree (2020) era, and she captioned the post, "this is the dress I want to be buried in..."

In March 2023, Poppy returned to Sumerian Records and announced a new single called "Church Outfit", which was released on April 4. Ash Avildsen, the founder of Sumerian, welcomed Poppy back to the label, stating: "The only thing more exciting than signing an iconic artist for the first time is signing them again when the choose to return home".

On July 19, 2023, Poppy announced Zig and released the second single, "Knockoff". Following the announcement, the album was immediately made available for pre-order. After being leaked online, "Motorbike" was released on September 12 as the third single from the album. On October 20, the fourth and final single, "Hard" was released, with Poppy having performed it live prior to its release. On December 1, Poppy released a music video for "Flicker", the fifth track on the album.

== Recording and composition ==
Poppy made over 40 songs for Zig, though just 11 made the final tracklist. She primarily worked with Simon Wilcox and Ali Payami, the latter of whom produced every track from the album. The songwriting was organized into four different journals, based on the idea of the song. Poppy said of the album's conception, "I'll come in with a skeleton and we piece it together. I feel the need to make sense of my own code, in an effort to understand myself." She also performed the guitar and bass on the album.

The album has been labeled as dark pop, industrial-pop, electropop, alternative pop, nu metal, industrial metal, and "dark" electronica. "Linger" has been described by Alternative Press to be a 'goth ballad' song, comparing it to Britney Spears' 2004 single "Everytime". Sputnikmusic described the tenth track "Motorbike" as "sheer bubblegum pop", whereas Sumerian Records describes the final track on the album, "Prove It", as switching between "unfettered and vulnerable" to "double speed, fuzzed-up, distorted screaming."

== Critical reception ==
Professional ratings
Aggregate scores
Source	Rating
Metacritic	68/100
Review scores
Source	Rating
AllMusic	4/5 stars
Dork	4/5 stars
Hysteria Mag	9/10
Kerrang!	4/5
The Forty-Five	3/5 stars
Louder Sound	3/5 stars
Metal Hammer	4/5 stars
Slant	2.5/5 stars
Sputnikmusic	2.5/5
Wall of Sound	8.5/10

Zig received generally positive reviews. On Metacritic, the album received a score of 68 out of 100 based on five reviews, indicating "generally favorable reviews". Critics were positive towards the album's focus on electronic music and Poppy's return to pop, whereas criticism was aimed at the album's predictability and lack of heavier sounds that were present on Poppy's previous records. In a positive review, Neil Z. Yeung of AllMusic called Zig Poppy's most "mature work to date" stating, "she lays the viscera on the table, opening herself up like never before and showcasing her most human moments yet." Ali Shutler of Dork wrote, "There's rage, empowerment, peace and giddy joy as Poppy once again shakes things up." Tiana Speter of Hysteria mag was positive towards the album stating, "For fans of Poppy's 2020 savagery I Disagree or 2021's alt-rock pastiche Flux, Zig is certainly an entirely new era for the chameleonic artist...the electro-dance elements fused to Zig's spine proves that Poppy can write a pop song or dazzle with vulnerability like nobody's business – and still scream like a prismatic banshee should the occasion call for it." Luke Morton writing for Kerrang! praised the sound of the album stating, "Such polished production courses through veins of Zig...as the genre-muddling star incorporates elements of industrial, metal and jungle amongst the record's heavier junctures."

Since Zig is, for the most part, a departure from rock and metal sound of her recent work, Lisa Wright of The Forty-Five felt that the album was "a little unexciting" when including how Poppy "left jaws on the floor with her initial metal reinvention". Vicky Greer of Louder Sound had a similar opinion stating, "Zig ushers in Poppy's 'dark-pop' phase, but the thrilling extremity of her best work is missed here." Danni Leivers writing for Metal Hammer was positive about the album's sound stating, "There's a lot of ground covered here, but Zig never feels random or messy. Poppy...views [her] albums as 'timestamps' of her life and for that reason, her genre-bending feels less like an artist following trends...more an avid consumer of art, exploring her influences and making music by her own rules. Steve Erickson of Slant was less positive and feeling that on Zig, "Poppy has become what she's successfully evaded up to this point: predictable." Sputnikmusic had a similar conclusion to that of The Forty-Five and Louder Sound stating, "Poppy seems to be restrained here – as if something is holding her back from embracing her typically wild and unconventional whims." Kayla Hamilton of Wall of Sound was more positive towards the album stating, "Poppy is growing musically, but she is also growing personally. Zig is proof of that."

=== Year-end lists ===
Zig on year-end lists
Publication	Accolade	Year	Rank	Ref.
Revolver Magazine	Best albums of 2023	2023	25	
Kerrang	Top 50 best albums of 2023	2023	39	
British GQ	Best albums of 2023	2023	—	
Rock Sound	Top 50 albums of 2023	2023	22	
Dork	Top 50 albums of 2023	2023	29	

== Promotion ==
In 2023, Poppy and Pvris co-headlined the Godless/Goddess Tour.

In September 2023, Poppy announced that she would be embarking on the 2024 Zig Tour to support the album, revealing UK dates for February. On the same day, she was revealed as a support act for the Bad Omens tour Concrete Forever. In November, Poppy was announced as a support act for Thirty Seconds to Mars' 2024 world tour in the United States.

== Track listing ==
All tracks are written by Simon Wilcox, Ali Payami and Poppy, except where noted.

Zig track listing
No.	Title	Length
1.	"Church Outfit"	1:54
2.	"Knockoff" (Payami, Ian Kirkpatrick, Sean Douglas, Poppy, Wilcox)	3:04
3.	"Hard"	2:26
4.	"What It Becomes"	3:38
5.	"Flicker"	2:22
6.	"1s + 0s"	3:16
7.	"Zig"	2:28
8.	"Linger" (Poppy, Payami, Jocke Berg, Lara Andersson)	3:16
9.	"The Attic"	3:24
10.	"Motorbike"	2:26
11.	"Prove It"	2:15
Total length:		30:29

== Personnel ==
- Poppy – vocals, guitars, bass
- Ali Payami – production
- Sterling Sound – mastering
- Zakk Cervini – mixing
- Nik Trekov – mixing assistance
- Le3ay – photography
- Sean Douglas – additional instrumentation
- Ian Kirkpatrick – additional instrumentation
- Jocke Berg – additional instrumentation
- Lara Andersson – additional instrumentation
- Ralph Alexander – additional instrumentation
- Denis Kosiak – additional instrumentation
- Simon Wilcox – additional instrumentation

== Charts ==
Chart performance for Zig
Chart (2023)	Peak position
Scottish Albums (Official Charts)	74
UK Album Sales (OCC)	58
US Top Album Sales (Billboard)	27
Current Alternative Albums Charts (Billboard)	8
Current Rock Albums Charts (Billboard)	9

== Release history ==
Release dates and formats for Zig
Region	Date	Format	Label	Ref.
Various	October 27, 2023	CD; digital download; LP; streaming	Sumerian	
