= Angry (Mars Argo song) =

Single by Mars Argo
- Released: April 25, 2022
- Genre: Alternative/Indie
- Length: 3:54
- Label: SICMR
- Songwriter: Brittany Alexandria Sheets
- Producer: CJ Baran

Mars Argo singles chronology
"Using You" (2014)	"Angry" (2022)	"I Can Only Be Me" (2023)

"Angry" is the solo debut single by American indie rock singer Mars Argo after parting ways with Titanic Sinclair. The song was independently released digitally on April 25, 2022 with no prior announcement, and was the first Mars Argo song available on major streaming services, as well as the first new song released by Mars Argo since 2015.

== Release history ==
Release dates and formats for Angry
Region	Date	Format	Label	Distributor
Worldwide	April 25, 2022	digital download	SICMR (Should I Clean My Room)	DistroKid
Worldwide	April 25, 2022	streaming	SICMR (Should I Clean My Room)	DistroKid
