= Poppy.Computer Tour =

2017–2018 concert tour by Poppy

- Tour by Poppy
- Tour poster
- Location: Asia; Europe; North America
- Associated album: Poppy.Computer
- Start date: October 19, 2017
- End date: April 27, 2018
- Legs: 6
- No. of shows: 44

Poppy concert chronology
- Poppy.Computer Tour (2017–2018); Am I a Girl? Tour (2018–2019)

The Poppy.Computer Tour was the debut concert tour by American singer Poppy. The tour supports the singer's debut studio album, Poppy.Computer (2017). Starting in the fall of 2017, the tour played 38 cities, including 40 concerts in North America, one London concert in December, and three shows in Japan in early 2018.

== Background ==
Poppy announced plans of touring via Twitter, alongside her album announcement, on May 6, 2017. In late July, the concert schedule was released, showing 15 shows in the United States and Canada. This was followed with a 21-minute video posted on YouTube, where the singer stands in front of different backgrounds with two background artists. High demand added additional shows in Los Angeles and Chicago. The tour played in small venues and clubs, with a capacity of 400 or less. The setlist features nine tracks from the album and one from her 2016 EP. The show resembles Poppy's videos, featuring appearances from Titanic Sinclair and Charlotte the Mannequin.

A single show occurred in London on December 13, 2017, another in Tokyo on January 13, 2018, and a third in Mexico City on April 27, 2018. In March 2018, Poppy performed two more shows in Japan as part of the Popspring festival.

== Opening acts ==
- Charlotte the Mannequin

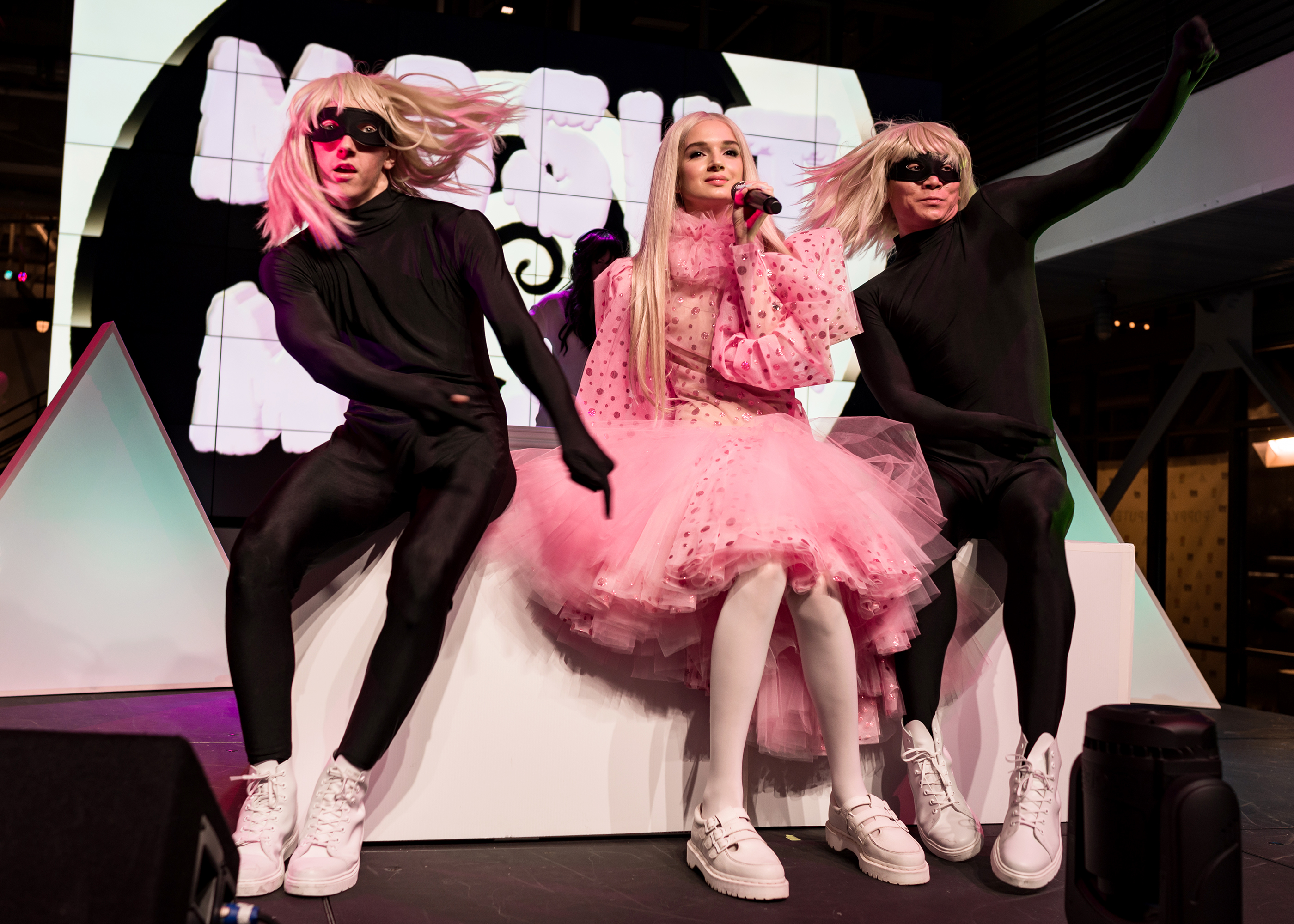
Poppy performing live at YouTube Space LA in Playa Vista, Los Angeles, California

== Set list ==
The following set list was from the November 3, 2017 concert, held at Stubb's in Austin, Texas. It does not represent all concerts for the duration of the tour.

1. "I'm Poppy"
2. "Computer Boy"
3. "Moshi Moshi"
4. "Bleach Blonde Baby"
5. "Interweb"
6. "Let's Make a Video"
7. "My Style"
8. "My Microphone"
9. "Software Upgrade"

Encore

10. "Money"

== Tour dates ==
List of 2017 concerts
Date	City	Country	Venue	Attendance	Revenue
October 19, 2017	Vancouver	United States	Rio Theatre	—N/a	—N/a
October 20, 2017	Seattle	United States	The Crocodile	—N/a	—N/a
October 21, 2017	Portland	United States	Hawthorne Theatre	—N/a	—N/a
October 26, 2017	San Francisco	United States	Slim's	—N/a	—N/a
October 27, 2017	Los Angeles	United States	Echoplex	—N/a	—N/a
October 28, 2017	Los Angeles	United States	Echoplex	—N/a	—N/a
October 29, 2017	San Diego	United States	Voodoo Room	—N/a	—N/a
November 1, 2017	Denver	United States	Bluebird Theater	—N/a	—N/a
November 3, 2017	Dallas	United States	Club Dada	—N/a	—N/a
November 4, 2017	Austin	United States	Stubb's	250 / 250	$4,000
November 5, 2017	Houston	United States	Bronze Peacock Room	—N/a	—N/a
November 7, 2017	Atlanta	United States	Vinyl	—N/a	—N/a
November 8, 2017	Nashville	United States	Mercy Lounge	—N/a	—N/a
November 10, 2017	Chicago	United States	Subterranean (Two shows)	—N/a	—N/a
November 11, 2017	Detroit	United States	The Shelter	—N/a	—N/a
November 14, 2017	Washington, D.C.	United States	Rock & Roll Hotel	—N/a	—N/a
November 15, 2017	New York	United States	Music Hall of Williamsburg	652 / 652	$11,099
November 16, 2017	Philadelphia	United States	The Foundry	—N/a	—N/a
November 18, 2017	Toronto	Canada	Velvet Underground	—N/a	—N/a
November 19, 2017	Montreal	Canada	L'Astral	384 / 400	$6,040
November 22, 2017	Cambridge	United States	The Sinclair	—N/a	—N/a
December 13, 2017	London	England	The Garage	—N/a	—N/a

List of 2018 concerts
Date	City	Country	Venue	Attendance	Revenue
January 13, 2018	Tokyo	Japan	Space Odd	—N/a	—N/a
January 17, 2018	Boston	United States	AfterHours	—N/a	—N/a
January 30, 2018	New York	United States	Bowery Ballroom	—N/a	—N/a
January 31, 2018	New York	United States	Bowery Ballroom	—N/a	—N/a
February 1, 2018	Pittsburgh	United States	The Club at Stage AE	400 / 400	$7,268
February 3, 2018	Columbus	United States	A&R Music Bar	400 / 400	$7,200
February 6, 2018	Indianapolis	United States	Deluxe at Old National Centre	—N/a	—N/a
February 7, 2018	Milwaukee	United States	Turner Hall Ballroom	—N/a	—N/a
February 8, 2018	Minneapolis	United States	The Cedar	—N/a	—N/a
February 10, 2018	St. Louis	United States	The Ready Room	—N/a	—N/a
February 11, 2018	Lawrence	United States	The Granada Theater	—N/a	—N/a
February 13, 2018	Santa Fe	United States	Meow Wolf	—N/a	—N/a
February 14, 2018	Phoenix	United States	The Crescent Ballroom	—N/a	—N/a
February 15, 2018	Paradise (Note: Promoted as Las Vegas)	United States	Vinyl	—N/a	—N/a
February 16, 2018	Salt Lake City	United States	Grand @ The Complex	—N/a	—N/a
February 18, 2018	Berkeley	United States	Cornerstone	—N/a	—N/a
February 20, 2018	Santa Ana	United States	The Observatory	—N/a	—N/a
March 24, 2018 (Note: The shows on March 24 and 25, 2018 were part of the Popspring festival.)	Chiba (Note: Promoted as Tokyo)	Japan	Makuhari Messe	—N/a	—N/a
March 25, 2018	Kobe (Note: Promoted as Osaka)	Japan	World Memorial Hall	—N/a	—N/a
April 7, 2018 (Note: The show on April 7, 2018 was part of the Emerge Impact + Music festival.)	Paradise	United States	The Linq	—N/a	—N/a
April 27, 2018	Mexico City	Mexico	El Plaza Condesa	—N/a	—N/a
