= Lowlife (song) =

2015 single by That Poppy

Single by That Poppy

from the EP Bubblebath
- Released: July 24, 2015
- Genre: Reggae fusion
- Length: 3:06
- Label: Island
- Songwriters: Moriah Pereira; Sir Nolan; Simon Wilcox
- Producer: Sir Nolan

Poppy singles chronology
| "Everybody Wants to Be Poppy" (2015) | "Lowlife" (2015) | "I'm Poppy" (2017) |

Music video
- "Lowlife" on YouTube

"Lowlife" is a song by American singer That Poppy (later known as Poppy). It was released by Island Records on July 24, 2015, as the only single from her debut extended play, Bubblebath (2016).

The song has been remixed by Travis Mills and Slushii, released on October 16, 2015, and April 29, 2016, respectively.

== Music video ==
A music video for the song, directed by Poppy's former collaborator Titanic Sinclair was released on July 24, 2015 by Teen Vogue. The video features cameos from Brandon Burtis, Matt Bennett, Jimmy Redhawk James and Rene Napoli. The video shows Poppy sitting in a chair in a Baphomet-like pose, while men in full-body outfits dance around her. Some men in business suits watch Poppy's every move as she gets up to dance. Poppy sits down at a table with the Devil, who sucks on a banana as a sexual symbol, annoying Poppy so much that she gets up and walks off-set. Poppy signs some fans' pictures of her, then walks back in and shoves aside the off-screen men in suits.

An acoustic performance of the song was uploaded to Poppy's YouTube channel on September 18, 2015. The video features Poppy singing in front of the men in full-body suits.

== Track listing ==
Digital download and streaming
| No. | Title | Length |
|---|---|---|
| 1. | "Lowlife" | 3:26 |

Digital download and streaming (Remix)
| No. | Title | Length |
|---|---|---|
| 1. | "Lowlife" (featuring Travis Mills) | 3:26 |

Digital download and streaming (Slushii remix)
| No. | Title | Length |
|---|---|---|
| 1. | "Lowlife" (Slushii remix) | 3:50 |

== Release history ==
Release dates and formats for "Lowlife"
| Region | Date | Format(s) | Version | Label | Ref. |
|---|---|---|---|---|---|
| Various | July 24, 2015 | Digital download; streaming | Original | Island | |
| Various | October 16, 2015 | Digital download; streaming | Remix featuring Travis Mills | Island | |
| United States | March 8, 2016 | Contemporary hit radio | Original | Republic | |
| Various | April 29, 2016 | Digital download; streaming | Slushii remix | Island | |
