= Mars Argo =

American entertainer

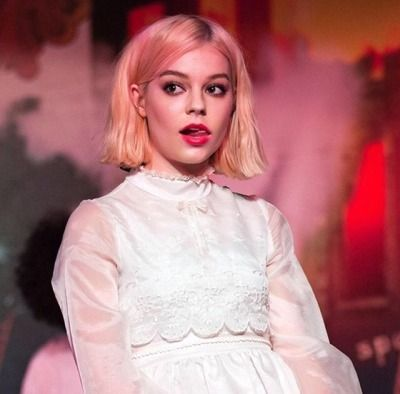
- Sheets in 2014
- Born: Brittany Alexandria Sheets; Saginaw, Michigan, U.S.
- Occupations: Singer; songwriter; actress; internet personality
- Years active: 2009–2015, 2022-present
- Musical career
- Genres: Alternative; indie; Rock; pop
- Instruments: Vocals; piano; guitar
- Labels: SICMR; Grocerybag

YouTube information
- Channel: Mars Argo
- Genres: Music; Internet culture; satire
- Subscribers: 235 thousand
- Views: 67.79 million
- Last updated: September 7, 2026
- Website: marsargo.com

Brittany Alexandria Sheets, known by her stage name Mars Argo, is an American singer, songwriter, actress and internet personality.

Sheets is prominently known for her portrayal of a fictionalized stage persona of herself on YouTube. She became the lead singer of an indie rock band named after the Mars Argo persona. The band released their only album, Technology Is a Dead Bird, in 2009, and then released two extended plays in 2010 and 2011. In a 2013 Vice article, the band stated that they were working on their own TV show along with a second album, but both projects were later abandoned.

Besides releasing music, Sheets co-produced, wrote, and directed content for her YouTube channel grocerybagdottv (renamed shouldicleanmyroom in 2022), formerly co-operated by her former partner Titanic Sinclair. The channel's content was often satirical, revolving around society and Internet culture. However, after the duo separated in early 2014, all but three videos (the music videos for "Using You", "Runaway Runaway", and a satirical video called "Delete Your Facebook") were removed from the channel.

On April 25, 2022, Sheets released her debut solo single "Angry", and a subsequent audio video was uploaded onto the channel. On March 15, 2023, she released another single titled "I Can Only Be Me". On June 24, 2024, Sheets released the I Can Only Be Me EP, containing a new song: "Lick It Like A Kitten".

== Early life ==
Brittany Alexandria Sheets was born in Saginaw, Michigan. Growing up, she played piano and sang in her church choir. She has stated that her mother never allowed her to play video games as a child, believing that they were a distraction from her studies. Before launching the YouTube project grocerybagdottv, Sheets attended university and was pursuing a major in biology.

== Career ==
=== 2009–2011: Career beginnings, Technology Is a Dead Bird, and Computer Show ===
After meeting Corey Michael Mixter (P.K.A. Titanic Sinclair) on Myspace, they cameoed and worked on the YouTube channel titled digitalfuntown. Sheets and Mixter later formed the alternative pop band Mars Argo. They also co-operated a YouTube channel under the title Grocerybagdottv (stylized in all lowercase), where they uploaded music-related content and a series of social commentary videos, initially dubbed Video Blog and later renamed Computer Show. Their most popular non-music video is a 2014 episode of this series, titled "Delete Your Facebook", mocking social media usage and the website of the same name. The music video for "Using You", the most well known single from the project, already counts more than 25 million views on the channel.

The band released their debut album, Technology Is a Dead Bird, on November 6, 2009. It was followed up with an acoustic EP, Internet Sessions, in 2010, and another EP, Linden Place, in 2011. They began working on an eventually scrapped and heavily delayed second album with Chicago-based producer, Johnny K, soon after Technology Is a Dead Bird was released.

=== 2015–2019: Mars Argo breaks up ===
Sheets and Mixter moved to Los Angeles in 2012, where they filmed and released the remainder of the YouTube channel's uploads, followed by the romantic separation of the couple in 2014. The band continued to perform during the South by Southwest festival in Austin, Texas, before going on a hiatus, being briefly revived in December of the same year, although permanently splitting up sometime in March 2015. According to a 2018 lawsuit filed by Sheets, the dissolvement of both the relationship and band was due to Mixter's incessant verbal abuse and physical violence.

Sheets resurfaced in April 2018, by addressing her absence, and promising new music in the future to her fans.

=== 2020–present: Dinner in America, Angry and future projects ===
Sheets portrayed Sissy in the film Dinner in America alongside Kyle Gallner, Emily Skeggs, Pat Healy, Griffin Gluck, Lea Thompson, and Mary Lynn Rajskub. The film was filmed in Detroit, Michigan and was selected to premiere at the 2020 Sundance Film Festival. On April 25, 2022, Sheets released her debut solo single independently, titled "Angry". The single was released onto streaming services and uploaded onto the now-renamed shouldicleanmyroom YouTube channel.

On November 13, 2023, Sheets released her most popular single, "Using You", on Spotify, over nine years after its initial release. The track is the original studio recording of the song, however Sinclair's backing vocals have been removed.

== Lawsuit against Sinclair and Poppy ==
On April 17, 2018, Sheets filed a 44-page lawsuit against Corey Mixter and his then-collaborator Poppy (real name Moriah Rose Pereira) alleging copyright infringement, stalking, and emotional and physical abuse being inflicted upon her by the former. That same day, Sheets posted a message on her social media pages addressing the lawsuit, thanking fans for their support and confirming new music to come. On May 7, Poppy put forth a public statement about the "frivolous" lawsuit, stating that Sheets was attempting to manipulate her psychologically. She called the suit a "publicity campaign" and a "desperate grab for fame".

The lawsuit was dismissed on September 14, having been settled outside of court with agreements that Mixter and Pereira would not be in contact with Sheets, and with Sheets gaining all rights, title and interest to the Mars Argo music and brand. Pereira later publicly split with Mixter in December 2019, and alleged that she was a victim of "manipulative patterns" by him. However, Pereira has never publicly retracted her initial statements regarding the lawsuit and said that she was not controlled by Mixter. All parties agreed to not contact each other directly and to only do so via their legal counsel.

== Discography ==
=== Studio albums ===
Title	Details
Technology Is a Dead Bird	Released: November 6, 2009; Label: Grocerybag Media; Format: Digital download

=== Compilation albums ===
Title	Details
Mars Argo CD	Released: March 23, 2012; Label: Grocerybag Media; Format: CD

=== Extended plays ===
Title	Details
Internet Sessions	Released: August 18, 2010; Label: Grocerybag Media; Format: Digital download
Linden Place	Released: March 20, 2011; Label: Grocerybag Media; Format: Digital download
I Can Only Be Me EP	Released: June 24, 2024; Label: SICMR; Format: Digital download, streaming

=== Singles ===
List of singles as lead artist, showing year released and album name
Title	Year	Album
"Love in Black and White"	2011	Linden Place
"Pls Don't Forget Me"	2012	Non-album single
"Runaway Runaway"	2012	Mars Argo
"Using You" (Note: "Using You" was originally featured on the EP Linden Place, where the production was handled by Sinclair. A remixed version of the song was released in 2014 as a single, this time being produced by Johnny K.)	2014	Non-album single
"Angry"	2022	I Can Only Be Me EP
"I Can Only Be Me"	2023	I Can Only Be Me EP

=== Guest appearances ===
List of non-single guest appearances, showing year released, other artist featured, and album name
Title	Year	Other artist	Album
"Limousine Machine"	2012	Titanic Sinclair	Thick Jello

=== Music videos ===
Title	Year	Other artist	Director(s)	Ref.
"Tired Today"	2009	None	Titanic Sinclair	
"The Singularity Is Near"	2009	None	Titanic Sinclair	
"Monsters Under My Bed"	2009	None	Titanic Sinclair	
"Mrs. Stadler"	2010	None	Matthew Franklin, Tony Katai	
"Love in Black and White"	2011	None	Matthew Franklin, Tony Katai	
"Beauty Is Empty"	2012	None	Titanic Sinclair	
"Limousine Machine"	2012	Titanic Sinclair	Titanic Sinclair	
"Runaway Runaway"	2013	None	Tony Katai	
"Using You"	2014	None	Ryan Wehner	
"I Can Only Be Me"	2023	None	Unknown	

== Filmography ==
Year	Title	Role	Notes
2020	Dinner in America	Sissy	Cameo
