= Interweb (song) =

Single by Poppy

from the album Poppy.Computer
- Released: July 17, 2017
- Genre: Electropop; new wave; EDM
- Length: 3:49
- Label: Mad Decent
- Songwriters: Moriah Pereira; Corey Mixter; Simon Wilcox
- Producer: Corey Mixter

Poppy singles chronology
"Let's Make a Video" (2017)	"Interweb" (2017)	"My Style" (2017)

Music video
- "Interweb" on YouTube

"Interweb" is a song recorded by American singer Poppy. It was released by Mad Decent on July 17, 2017 as the fourth single from her debut studio album, Poppy.Computer (2017). The electropop song was written by Poppy, Simon Wilcox and the producer Titanic Sinclair.

== Composition ==
"Interweb" is an electro-infused new wave and 1990s-inspired EDM song with a length of three minutes and forty nine seconds. It moves at a tempo of 114 beats per minute in a 4/4 time signature. The song's instrumentation features a basic house beat and a disco bassline. The song features "internet-obsessive" lyrics.

== Critical reception ==
Benjamin Groff of We Are The Guard wrote that the song "is a mockery of Taylor Swift Illuminati conspiracy theories, as well as bleaker, sadder realities - the isolation, depression, and searching common to so many of us." Jake Visnawath of Paper wrote that "Poppy seems to own her possessive powers for the first time in the track." Golden Boy Press wrote that the character of Poppy "doesn't disappear even when she sings, she keeps it going in a way that's new, fresh, and interesting."

== Music video ==
The music video for "Interweb" was released on July 21, 2017. The visual piece features the singer under dark technicolor red and blue lights as two figures dance in the background. Paper magazine wrote that the video's dancers "practically perform hypnosis over the Web." Jordan Miller of Breathe Heavy called the video "beautifully bizarre."

== Live performances ==
Poppy made her late night debut on The Late Late Show with James Corden on August 2, 2017, where she performed the single. "Interweb" was also on the setlist for the 2017-18 Poppy.Computer Tour.

== Track listing ==
Taken from iTunes.

No.	Title	Length
1.	"Interweb"	3:49

== Release history ==
Release dates and formats for "Interweb"
Region	Date	Format	Label	Ref.
Various	July 17, 2017	Digital download; streaming	Mad Decent	
