= Never Let You Go (Slushii song) =

2019 single by Slushii featuring Sofía Reyes

Single by Slushii featuring Sofía Reyes
- Released: January 18, 2019
- Recorded: 2018
- Genre: Dancehall; tropical; EDM
- Length: 2:43
- Label: Big Beat Records
- Songwriters: Úrsula Sofía Reyes Piñeyro; Julian Michael Scanlan; Aviella Winder
- Producer: Slushii

Slushii singles chronology
"Find" (2018)	"Never Let You Go" (2019)	"Self Destruct" (2019)

Sofía Reyes singles chronology
"Bittersweet" (2018)	"Never Let You Go" (2019)	"Lo Siento" (2019)

Music video
- "Never Let You Go" on YouTube

"Never Let You Go" is a song by American DJ Slushii featuring Mexican singer Sofía Reyes. It was released through Big Beat Records on January 18, 2019.

== Composition ==
"Never Let You Go" is a dancehall, moombahton-tropical EDM song with chill production, dreamy elements and electric guitar break. Billboard described it as "dancehall-inspired rhythm lays the foundation for a fruit-flavored future-style melody." It was written by both artists with Aviella Winder.

== Music video ==
An accompanied music video released on the same day featuring both artists in supermarket. According to the director Tim Fox, some of elements were made up of anime imagery such as Pokémon. He stated that "I wanted to add a bit of my own dark humour so it didn't feel orientated at kids, so there are characters vomiting, eating each other and doing rainbow poo's. However my five year old niece absolutely loves this video. She was the influence behind the unicorn doing a rainbow poo."

== Charts ==
Chart (2019)	Peak position
US Dance/Mix Show Airplay (Billboard)	15

== Release history ==
Region	Date	Version	Label	Ref.
United Kingdom	March 15, 2019	Wh0's Festival Remix	Big Beat Records	
