= Technology Is a Dead Bird =

Studio album by Mars Argo
- Released: November 6, 2009
- Recorded: 2008–2009
- Length: 26:50
- Label: Grocerybag
- Producer: Titanic Sinclair; Jesse Meyer; Justin McGrath

Mars Argo chronology
Technology Is a Dead Bird (2009)	Internet Sessions (2010)

Technology Is a Dead Bird is the only studio album by American rock band Mars Argo, released on November 6, 2009 independently through Bandcamp and later iTunes. An instrumental version of the album was released the following month to Bandcamp on December 11, 2009, with the intention of being used by aspiring YouTubers as background music for their videos. A promotional EP containing acoustic renditions originally uploaded on YouTube, titled Internet Sessions, was released on August 18, 2010.

== Background ==
Lead vocalists Brittany Sheets and Titanic Sinclair met in early 2008 and quickly started to collaborate for video content on Sinclair's group YouTube channel DigitalFunTown, and later their own YouTube channel as a duo. (Note: Page 2. Article 3) They started producing instrumental songs to complement their videos as background music, and soon transitioned into officially making music as a band, as the result of positive reception from viewers. Starting in early 2009, the band frequently uploaded demos of new songs to the website Muxtape, providing a preview for the album to come.

The first album trailer was released to their YouTube channel on July 10, 2009, simultaneously acting as an official music video for the introduction "The Singularity Is Near". A second trailer, this time using an instrumental excerpt of "Mrs. Stadler", was uploaded on October 22.

== Critical reception ==
Sheets' vocals were described as "Kewpie doll sweet" by one critic from Consequence of Sound magazine who overall had mixed views on the project.

== Track listing ==
All tracks are written by Brittany Sheets and Corey Mixter. All tracks are produced by Mixter, except where noted.

Technology Is a Dead Bird
No.	Title	Producer(s)	Length
1.	"The Singularity Is Near"		0:59
2.	"Suicide Birds"	Mixter; Jesse Meyer	3:12
3.	"Mrs Stadler"		3:26
4.	"Machine"		3:23
5.	"Monsters Under My Bed"		1:02
6.	"Technology Is a Dead Bird"		3:55
7.	"Sideways and Sideways"		2:26
8.	"You Don't Know Me Anymore"	Mixter; Justin McGrath	4:44
9.	"Feeling Welcome in a Time Warp"		0:39
10.	"Tired Today"		3:04
Total length:			26:50

Technology Is a Dead Bird (instrumental)
No.	Title	Producer(s)	Length
1.	"The Singularity Is Near" (instrumental)		0:59
2.	"Suicide Birds" (instrumental)	Mixter; Meyer	3:12
3.	"Mrs Stadler" (instrumental)		3:26
4.	"Machine" (instrumental)		3:23
5.	"Monsters Under My Bed" (instrumental)		1:02
6.	"Technology Is a Dead Bird" (instrumental)		3:55
7.	"Sideways and Sideways" (instrumental)		2:26
8.	"You Don't Know Me Anymore" (instrumental)	Mixter; McGrath	4:44
9.	"Feeling Welcome in a Time Warp" (instrumental)		0:39
10.	"Tired Today" (instrumental)		3:04
Total length:			26:50
