= Choke (Poppy EP) =

EP by Poppy
- Released: June 28, 2019
- Recorded: 2018–2019
- Genre: Electropop; synth-pop; nu metal
- Length: 16:50
- Label: I'm Poppy; Mad Decent
- Producer: Titanic Sinclair; Chris Greatti; Zakk Cervini

Poppy chronology
Am I a Girl? (2018)	Choke (2019)	I Disagree (2020)

Singles from Choke
- 1. "Voicemail" Released: January 31, 2019; 2. "Scary Mask" Released: May 29, 2019; 3. "Choke" Released: June 19, 2019

Choke is the second extended play (EP) by American singer and songwriter Poppy. It was released on June 28, 2019, as her last project under Mad Decent. Containing influence from various different genres, the EP has often been labeled as genre-blending, serving as a follow-up to her second studio album, Am I a Girl? (2018).

In support of the EP, Poppy embarked on the co-headlining Threesome Tour in 2019 alongside Bring Me the Horizon and Sleeping with Sirens.

== Background ==
Poppy released her second studio album Am I a Girl? in 2018. On the latter half of the album she began using metal influences, notably on "X". Poppy initially created the song "Voicemail" as a follow-up to "X", before eventually amalgamating enough material for a full extended play.

Poppy announced "Voicemail" during an interview with Forbes. She said it was chosen to be the lead single to bridge "X" to Choke because "we saw that visual [the black and white music video] so strongly that I think it needed to tell the story next." To promote the single, Poppy created a phone number where fans could leave a voicemail to her.

In an interview with Gigwise, Poppy revealed that the project was intended to be called Meat, after the fourth track, but she decided to abandon the idea.

== Reception ==
American music blog Ones to Watch described the EP as a 'modern metal version' of Marina's second album Electra Heart. British site Gigwise compared the chords and bass used throughout the project to Nine Inch Nails.

== Promotion ==
"Voicemail" was released as Choke's lead single on January 31, 2019. Its black and white music video has been described by Alternative Press to be her "creepiest music video to date." The second single "Scary Mask" features American rock band Fever 333, and it was released on May 29, 2019. The song has been performed by Poppy live at WWE NXT. The title track, "Choke", was released as the final single on June 19, 2019, along with the pre-order of the EP. The song premiered on BBC Radio 1 before its official release.

== Track listing ==
Choke track listing
No.	Title	Writer(s)	Producer(s)	Length
1.	"Choke"	Poppy Chan; Titanic Sinclair	Sinclair	4:02
2.	"Voicemail"	Poppy Chan; Sinclair	Sinclair	2:42
3.	"Scary Mask" (featuring Fever 333)	Poppy Chan; Sinclair; Chris Greatti; Zakk Cervini; Stephen Harrison	Greatti; Cervini	3:02
4.	"Meat"	Poppy Chan; Sinclair; Simon Wilcox	Sinclair	3:32
5.	"The Holy Mountain"	Poppy Chan; Sinclair	Sinclair	3:32
Total length:				16:50

== Release history ==
Release dates and formats for Choke
Region	Date	Format(s)	Label	Ref.
Various	June 28, 2019	Digital download; streaming	Mad Decent	
Various	July 26, 2019	Cassette	Mad Decent	
