= Bubblebath (EP) =

EP by That Poppy
- Released: February 12, 2016
- Recorded: 2014–2015
- Length: 12:47
- Label: Island
- Producer: Tommy English; Tyler Glenn; Tim Pagnotta; Sir Nolan

That Poppy chronology
Bubblebath (2016)	Poppy.Computer (2017)

Singles from Bubblebath
- 1. "Lowlife" Released: July 24, 2015

Bubblebath is the debut extended play (EP) by American singer-songwriter That Poppy (later known as Poppy). It was released on February 12, 2016, by Island Records as her first and only release on the label.

== Composition ==
Bubblebath incorporates elements of ska-pop and punk. The EP opens up with "Lowlife", a reggae song that serves as Bubblebath's only single. "Money" and "Altar" are described as "retro-bangers." "American Kids" lyrically talks about millennial stereotypes. Popular TV described the song as the "antithesis to Halsey's 'New Americana,' but just as anthemic." Poppy states that the EP's name comes from the idea that the world is 'dirty' and would benefit from a bubblebath.

== Critical reception ==
Tyler Peterson of UQMUSIC gave the EP a positive review, calling it a "little collection of some major millennial masterpieces." He further wrote: "Blazing full force with her Electra-Heart-meets-Princess-Peach persona, That Poppy is demonstrating some serious staying power with her committed visual and sonic aesthetics."

== Promotion ==
"Lowlife" was released as a single on July 24, 2015. PopularTV has described the track as one that "will make you want to break out your old checkered Vans and hang with the skater boys." "Lowlife" was later featured on the compilation album Now That's What I Call Music! 58 in the United States, and a version of the track featuring rapper Travis Mills was released under Island Records in April 2016 and has received airplay on BBC Radio. A music video for the song was released in July 2015, premiering on Teen Vogue. In September 2016, "Lowlife" was nominated for a Tiger Beat "19 Under 19" Award for "Most Influential Song".

In July 2016, Poppy released a music video for "Money", which kept a similar tone to her YouTube videos. "Money" was used in the first episode of the second season of the television series Scream, titled "I Know What You Did Last Summer". It became a frequent encore song for Poppy's Poppy.Computer Tour.

== Track listing ==
Credits adapted from iTunes Store.

No.	Title	Writer(s)	Producer(s)	Length
1.	"Lowlife"	Moriah Pereira; Nolan Lambroza; Simon Wilcox	Sir Nolan	3:26
2.	"Money"	Pereira; Wilcox; Tom Schleiter; Corey Mixter	Tommy English	3:10
3.	"Altar"	Pereira; Wilcox; Lambroza; Bryce Vine; Tom Peyton	Sir Nolan	2:40
4.	"American Kids"	Pereira; Mixter; Tim Pagnotta; Tyler Glenn	Pagnotta; Glenn	3:31
Total length:				12:47

== Release history ==
Release dates and formats for Bubblebath
Region	Date	Format	Label	Ref.
Various	February 12, 2016	Digital download; streaming	Island	
