= Stagger (EP) =

2022 EP by Poppy

EP by Poppy
- Released: October 14, 2022
- Length: 11:32
- Labels: Republic; Lava
- Producers: Ted Gowans; Mike Elizondo; Justin Meldal-Johnsen; David Greenbaum

Poppy chronology
Flux (2021)	Stagger (2022)	Zig (2023)

Singles from Stagger
- 1. "FYB" Released: September 23, 2022

Stagger is the fifth extended play (EP) by American singer Poppy. It was released on October 14, 2022, by Republic Records and Lava Records. It is her only release on the labels.

== Background and release ==
In March 2022, during the first show of the Never Find My Place Tour, Poppy debuted an unreleased song called "Stagger". In August, Poppy performed at the Reading Festival and debuted another unreleased song titled "FYB", an acronym for "Fuck You Back". This coincided with the announcement of a four-track EP titled Stagger, which Poppy confirmed in an interview with Dork along with a partial release date of October 2022. In the interview, she revealed that the EP would contain "a couple of fun songs, and one slower song", and promised "more guitars". "FYB" was later released as a single on September 23, alongside a visualizer.

Following the release of the single, Stagger's release date was revealed. It was also announced that the EP would be released under Republic and Lava Records. An official music video for the title track was released on the same day as the EP's release. The third track "Shapes" was later featured on the soundtrack to the baseball video game MLB The Show 23.

Speaking about the EP, Poppy stated:

"Well the EP is consisting of four songs and I just feel like they are a mini-chapter in my life. I wrote the songs in December of last year, so it's taken them a moment to come out and I'm really excited about it."

== Composition ==
According to Loudwire, "FYB" demonstrates a "thrashy punk rock style". Metal Hammer noted "punk metal riffs" on the song. According to Poppy, the song is a "[revenge anthem about] somebody getting what they deserve, without you yourself having to lift a finger". "Pocket" has been described by Kerrang! as a "discordant electro-grunge" song. The pop-rock song that talks about a toxic relationship, "Shapes" has been described by NYU News to be the 'most mainstream' of all of the songs on the EP. Revolver described the closing track as a "melancholy trip-hop ballad".

== Track listing ==
Stagger track listing
No.	Title	Writer(s)	Producer(s)	Length
1.	"FYB"	Poppy; Simon Wilcox; Ted Gowans	Mike Elizondo; Gowans^{[a]}	1:46
2.	"Pocket"	Poppy; Justin Meldal-Johnsen	Meldal-Johnsen	3:32
3.	"Shapes"	Poppy; Wilcox; Gowans; Nicolas Perez	Elizondo; Gowans^{[a]}	2:43
4.	"Stagger"	Poppy; Gowans	David Greenbaum; Gowans	3:31
Total length:				11:32

Note

- ^{^[a]} indicates an assistant producer

== Personnel ==
Musicians

- Poppy – vocals
- Ralph Alexander – drums
- Mike Elizondo – bass (tracks 1, 3)
- Ted Gowans – guitar (1, 3), synthesizer programming (1, 3, 4), keyboards (4)
- Justin Meldal-Johnsen – bass, drum programming, guitar, percussion, synthesizer programming (2)
- Matt McJunkins – bass (4)
- Nick Perez – guitar (4)

Technical

- Ted Gowans – production (1, 3, 4)
- Justin Meldal-Johnsen – production (2)
- Mike Elizondo – production (1, 3)
- David Greenbaum – production, engineering (4)
- Chris Gehringer – mastering
- Adam Hawkins – mixing (1, 3)
- Zakk Cervini – mixing, engineering (2)
- Darrell Thorp – mixing (4)
- Justin Francis – engineering (1, 3)
- Alex Pasco – engineering (4)
- Nik Trekov – mixing assistance (2)

== Release history ==
Stagger release history
Region	Date	Format(s)	Labels	Ref.
Various	October 14, 2022	Digital download; streaming	Republic; Lava	
Various	April 21, 2023	LP record	Republic; Lava	
