= Eat (NXT Soundtrack) =

EP soundtrack by Poppy
- Released: June 8, 2021
- Recorded: 2020–2021
- Genre: Metalcore; industrial pop
- Length: 14:24
- Label: Sumerian
- Producer: Poppy

Poppy chronology
I Disagree (2020)	Eat (NXT Soundtrack) (2021)	Flux (2021)

Eat (NXT Soundtrack) is the fourth extended play (EP) by American singer Poppy and the soundtrack for WWE NXT. It was released on June 8, 2021 by Sumerian Records during Poppy's appearance on the show.

Although no official singles were released, several of the songs were promoted at various events throughout 2021.

== Background and release ==
Following the release of the noise album Music to Scream To and the Christmas EP A Very Poppy Christmas in the second semester of 2020, Poppy revealed in an interview to the magazine Spin in December that she was working on her fourth studio album and other projects. On March 13, 2021, Poppy announced through her social media she would be performing a new song at the 63rd Annual Grammy Awards, The following day, the track "Eat" was performed for the first time, but was not released as a single at the time. A month later, on April 6, it was announced that Poppy would debut a new song on NXT TakeOver: Stand & Deliver. A cover of Adam and the Ants' "Stand and Deliver" and an original song called "Say Cheese" were performed at the event. On April 20, "Say Cheese" became the official theme song for NXT.

On June 8, Poppy returned to the show NXT and released the EP Eat (NXT Soundtrack) live, featuring "Eat", "Say Cheese" and three new songs. "Dark Dark World" was also announced as the theme song for In Your House.

== Critical reception ==
Revolver Magazine praised Eat (NXT Soundtrack) as "some of [Poppy's] best work yet", calling it "heavier" and "skronkier". In June 2021, the EP was included in the magazine's list of 20 Best Albums of 2021 so far, and the title track was included in the list of 30 Best Songs of 2021 so far.

=== Year-end lists ===
Publication	Accolade	Year	Rank	Ref.
Revolver	25 Best Albums of 2021	2021	9	

== Track listing ==
Eat (NXT Soundtrack) track listing
No.	Title	Writer(s)	Length
1.	"Eat"	Poppy; Chris Greatti	3:01
2.	"Say Cheese"	Poppy; Greatti	2:42
3.	"Cue"	Poppy; Greatti	3:26
4.	"Breeders"	Simon Wilcox; Poppy	2:26
5.	"Dark Dark World"	Poppy; Greatti	2:49
Total length:			14:24

== Release history ==
Release dates and formats for Eat (NXT Soundtrack)
Region	Date	Format(s)	Label	Ref.
Various	June 8, 2021	Digital download; streaming	Sumerian	
Various	July 2021	Cassette	Sumerian	
United States	April 20, 2024	Twelve-inch vinyl	Sumerian	
