= Out of Light =

Studio album by Slushii
- Released: August 4, 2017
- Genres: Future bass; dubstep; future house
- Length: 45:17
- Label: Slushii
- Producer: Julian Scanlan

Slushii chronology
Brain Freeze (2016)	Out of Light (2017)	Find Your Wings (2018)

Singles from Out of Light
- 1. "I Still Recall" Released: January 17, 2017; 2. "Dear Me" Released: February 6, 2017; 3. "Step by Step" Released: July 14, 2017; 4. "My Senses" Released: July 28, 2017

Out of Light is the debut studio album of American electronic music producer and DJ Slushii, consisting of 13 songs, that was self-released under his label, Slushii on 4 August 2017.

== Background ==
Slushii announced the album on July 21, 2017, on Twitter. Each song from the album consists of his own "cartoonish and pitched-up" vocals.

Announcement of the album was made as Slushii underwent an emergency appendectomy. Hospitalized in Paris, his small bowel had to be removed as it troubled him.

== Singles ==
Previous recorded songs by Slushii such as "Dear Me", "My Senses", "Step By Step" and "I Still Recall", were also included in the album.

"Forever" on the album is a reworked version of a Deuteronomy B-side titled "Hold Me Forever", the band which Scanlan was a member from 2009 until 2013.

== Track listing ==
Credits adapted from Tidal.

Out of Light

No.	Title	Length
1.	"Into the Light"	3:58
2.	"Step by Step"	3:05
3.	"Fly High"	4:01
4.	"Someone Else"	3:41
5.	"Melting over You"	3:08
6.	"Forever"	3:47
7.	"Reason"	3:30
8.	"I Still Recall"	3:11
9.	"My Senses"	3:33
10.	"Hold On"	3:01
11.	"Dear Me"	3:28
12.	"I’ll Be There"	3:31
13.	"Out of Light"	3:22
Total length:		45:17

== Personnel ==
- Slushii – production, songwriting, mixing, recording, vocals
- Deuteronomy – songwriting on "Forever"
- Xsilvee – mixing
