= Poppy.Computer =

2017 album by Poppy

Studio album by Poppy
- Released: October 6, 2017
- Recorded: Late 2016 – May 2017
- Genre: Art pop; synth-pop; electropop; bubblegum pop
- Length: 34:17
- Label: I'm Poppy; Mad Decent
- Producer: Chris Greatti; Ryosuke Sakai; Titanic Sinclair

Poppy chronology
Bubblebath (2016)	Poppy.Computer (2017)	Poppy.Remixes (2018)

Singles from Poppy.Computer
- 1. "I'm Poppy" Released: February 14, 2017; 2. "Computer Boy" Released: May 19, 2017; 3. "Let's Make a Video" Released: June 22, 2017; 4. "Interweb" Released: July 17, 2017; 5. "My Style" Released: September 1, 2017

Poppy.Computer is the debut studio album by American singer and songwriter Poppy. It was released on October 6, 2017, by Mad Decent. The album's songs were recorded with Simon Wilcox, Titanic Sinclair, Chris Greatti and Ryosuke Sakai. It is heavily influenced by Japanese music and culture and is an art pop record. The album was included in Rolling Stone's list of best pop albums in 2017.

== Background ==
Poppy.Computer was written in Los Angeles during 2016 by Poppy and Titanic Sinclair, with help from songwriter Simon Wilcox and Chris Greatti of Blame Candy. Near the end of the year, Poppy and Sinclair went to Japan to work with producers on the record, then went back in the spring of 2017 to finish it.

On May 6, 2017, Poppy confirmed on Twitter that her debut album was finished. On the same tweet Poppy also confirmed that there would be a tour to promote the album and that she knows when the album will be released. After being interviewed for an article with Wired, the website accidentally leaked the release date of Poppy's album as October 6, 2017, which is also the anniversary of Poppy's YouTube channel creation.

Poppy released five singles from the album. The second single "Computer Boy" has been nominated for Song of The Year at the Unicorn Awards. The third single "Interweb" was performed live on The Late Late Show with James Corden. Music videos were also released for "Moshi Moshi" in November and "Bleach Blonde Baby" in December. The latter was also performed on Total Request Live on January 29, 2018.

== Composition ==
Poppy.Computer has been labelled by critics as an art pop, synth-pop, electropop, and bubblegum pop album. The album has been described to be different than her previous work, Bubblebath (2016). Poppy said that "these songs are a collection of writings inspired by enthusiasm and imagination."

== Critical reception ==
Professional ratings
Review scores
Source	Rating
AllMusic	3/5 stars

AllMusic's Neil Z. Yeung noted an "injection" of J-pop into Poppy's "computer veins", mentioning that the album results in a "winking piece of art pop that sounds like Fame-era Lady Gaga meets Grimes or L.A.M.B.-era Gwen Stefani going full 'Harajuku Girl[s]'", also suggesting to "think of this as the 'Material Girl' for the Internet age". Rolling Stone's Maura Johnston said that "[it] adds her airy voice to hyper-stylized, detail-rich gloss-pop", also stating that "Poppy.Computer's off-kilter recounting of microcelebrity, hiccuping vocals and intricate production help her neatly avoid that fate".

=== Year-end lists ===
Publication	Accolade	Year	Rank	Ref.
Rolling Stone	20 Best Pop Albums of 2017	2017	18	

== Track listing ==
Credits adapted from Tidal.

Poppy.Computer track listing
No.	Title	Writer(s)	Producer(s)	Length
1.	"I'm Poppy"	Poppy; Simon Wilcox; Titanic Sinclair	Ryosuke Sakai	3:06
2.	"Let's Make a Video"	Masanori Takumi; Poppy; Sinclair	Sakai	2:52
3.	"Bleach Blonde Baby"	Poppy; Wilcox; Sinclair	Sakai	3:29
4.	"My Microphone"	Chris Greatti; Poppy	Greatti; Sakai	2:51
5.	"Moshi Moshi"	Greatti; Poppy	Sakai	3:41
6.	"Computer Boy"	Greatti; Poppy	Greatti; Sakai	2:51
7.	"My Style" (featuring Charlotte)	Poppy; Wilcox; Sinclair	Sinclair	2:37
8.	"Fuzzy"	Greatti; Poppy	Greatti; Sakai	2:50
9.	"Interweb"	Poppy; Wilcox; Sinclair	Sinclair	3:49
10.	"Software Upgrade"	Poppy; Wilcox; Sinclair	Sakai	3:26
11.	"Pop Music"	Poppy; Wilcox; Sinclair	Sinclair	2:45
Total length:				34:17

== Charts ==
Chart (2017)	Peak position
US Heatseekers Albums (Billboard)	11
US Independent Albums (Billboard)	33

== Release history ==
Region	Date	Format	Label	Ref.
Various	October 6, 2017	CD; Digital download; LP; streaming	I'm Poppy; Mad Decent	

== Poppy.Remixes ==
Poppy.Remixes

EP by Poppy
- Released: March 16, 2018
- Length: 19:24
- Label: I'm Poppy; Mad Decent
- Producer: Ryosuke Sakai; Titanic Sinclair

Poppy chronology
Poppy.Computer (2017)	Poppy.Remixes (2018)	Am I a Girl? (2018)

Poppy.Remixes is a remix extended play (EP) by Poppy, released digitally on March 16, 2018 by Mad Decent. The EP contains a remix of "Interweb" and four remixes of "Moshi Moshi", originally from Poppy.Computer.

=== Track listing ===
Credits adapted from Tidal.

Poppy.Remixes track listing
No.	Title	Writer(s)	Producer(s)	Length
1.	"Interweb" (Nebbra remix)	Poppy; Simon Wilcox; Titanic Sinclair	Sinclair; Nebbra^{[a]}	4:18
2.	"Moshi Moshi" (Noboru remix)	Chris Greatti; Poppy	Ryosuke Sakai; Noboru^{[a]}	3:39
3.	"Moshi Moshi" (Mitch Murder remix)	Greatti; Poppy	Sakai; Mitch Murder^{[a]}	3:55
4.	"Moshi Moshi" (Clarabell remix)	Greatti; Poppy	Sakai; Clarabell^{[a]}	3:09
5.	"Moshi Moshi" (YUTO remix)	Greatti; Poppy	Sakai; YUTO^{[a]}	4:23
Total length:				19:24

Notes

- ^{^[a]} signifies a remixer
