= Slushii =

American musician and DJ (born 1997)

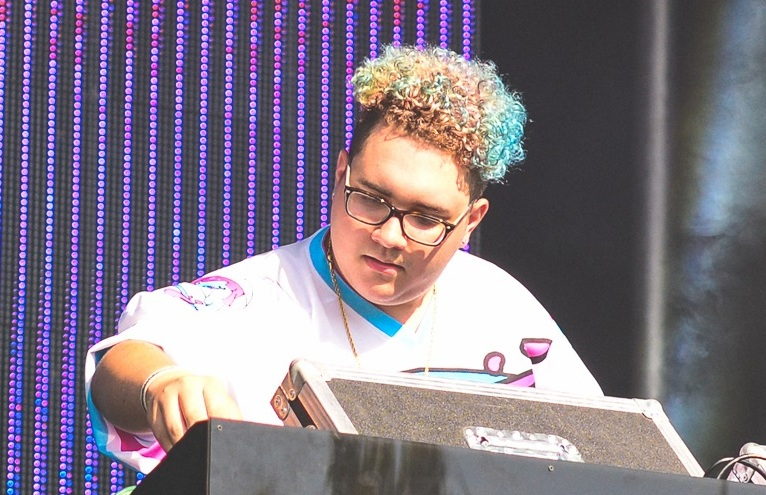
- Slushii at the Mad Decent Block Party in 2016

Background information
- Also known as: DJ Swoon; sapientdream
- Born: Julian Michael Scanlan; May 1, 1997 (age 29); Mount Laurel, New Jersey, U.S.
- Origin: Los Angeles, California, U.S.
- Genres: Dubstep; future bass; electro house; progressive house; trap
- Occupations: Music producer; DJ
- Works: Discography
- Years active: 2016–present
- Labels: Monstercat; Mad Decent; NoCopyrightSounds; Owsla; Joytime Collective

Julian Michael Scanlan (born May 1, 1997), known professionally as Slushii, is an American musician, DJ, songwriter, and music producer based in Los Angeles. He is best known for working with various artists managed by Moe Shalizi, such as Marshmello, Ookay and Jauz, and for gaining support from notable musician and Owsla-record label founder Skrillex.

== Early life ==
Scanlan grew up in Mount Laurel and graduated from Lenape High School in Burlington County, New Jersey. He worked at Best Buy as a customer service representative in New Jersey until the loss of his cloud-based music and followers led him to start down a new path. Scanlan was diagnosed with the now-defunct autism subtype Asperger's syndrome, which he says interfered with his ability to make friends and read social cues. As a result, he was victim of ableist bullying in middle school.

He began his musical career by joining psychedelic power-pop band Deuteronomy for three years until 2012, releasing one album, Propaganda. He was a part of the musical duo "Monsters with Tiny Mustaches" alongside his partner MHKAZ.

He became involved with dance music in 2013, using "DJ Swoon" as an alias. One of his SoundCloud posts as DJ Swoon was taken down due to SoundCloud's automatic copyright system, having his account permanently deleted. Shortly after the takedown of his previous alias, Scanlan decided to start a new musical project, dedicated to his more light-hearted and future bass sound, releasing his remix of Zedd and Selena Gomez's "I Want You to Know", which was his first official project under the stage name "Slushii".

== Career ==
=== 2016–2017 ===
He signed for Red Light Management in February 2016.

His first single for Canadian label Monstercat, Emptiness, was released on April 20, 2016. He self-released his seven-track debut extended play titled "Brain Freeze" on May 20, 2016. YourEDM gave it a 9.2 out of 10 rating. His musical style includes contemporary EDM production combining helium vocals, giddy trance synths, trap drums, and dubstep drops. He released "Dear Me" as a free download.

In March 2017, Slushii released a dubstep single titled "Catch Me". It was described as an "upbeat, trapstep-inspired & bass-heavy track". He later collaborated with future bass DJ, Marshmello, for their single "Twinbow", though this is not the first time that they have collaborated.

On August 4, 2017, Slushii released his debut studio album titled Out of Light, which contained 13 songs, including "Dear Me".

== Discography ==
- Out of Light (2017)
- Dream (2018)
- Dream II (2019)
- Dream III (2020)
- E.L.E (Extinction Level Event) (2022)
- A Slushii Summer (2022)
