= Flux (Poppy album) =

2021 studio album by Poppy

Studio album by Poppy
- Released: September 24, 2021
- Genre: Alternative rock; grunge; pop-punk; dream pop
- Length: 32:11
- Label: Sumerian
- Producer: Justin Meldal-Johnsen

Poppy chronology
Eat (NXT Soundtrack) (2021)	Flux (2021)	Stagger (2022)

Singles from Flux
- 1. "Her" Released: June 30, 2021; 2. "Flux" Released: July 29, 2021; 3. "So Mean" Released: August 25, 2021

Flux is the fourth studio album by American singer-songwriter Poppy. It was released on September 24, 2021, through Sumerian Records. The album was produced by Justin Meldal-Johnsen and features a more organic sound in comparison to her previous album, I Disagree. The album received positive reviews.

== Background and release ==
During an interview with Spin, Poppy said that she wanted the songwriting to be the focal point of the album as opposed to "the rollercoaster of emotions that I Disagree was." The album was produced by Justin Meldal-Johnsen who had previously worked with artists such as Paramore, M83 and St. Vincent, among others. On June 30, 2021, Poppy released the lead single for the new album titled, "Her". The title track was released as the second single for the album. On August 25, 2021, Poppy released the third single from the album titled "So Mean" and released it with an accompanying music video. The album was released on September 24, 2021.

== Composition ==
Flux has been primarily described as an alternative rock, grunge, pop-punk, dream pop, shoegaze, punk rock, gothic rock, and new wave album, that also delves into garage rock, power pop, post-punk, and indie rock. AllMusic called the album a "rock record." According to Clash, "Flux sees Poppy continue to embrace her love of punk, rock and heavy metal but still keeps that day-dreaming pop element to it that some of her previous works have." According to Spin, the album "[draws] on pop-punk ('So Mean'), new wave ('Hysteria') and shoegaze-y dream-pop ('As Strange as It Seems') in satisfying bursts." The title track utilizes some electronic elements. The album marks a departure from the metal sound of her previous album. However, the album still features some screaming from Poppy, and according to Brad Sanders of Pitchfork, "[the album,] in a few carefully chosen moments, [touches on] the metallic fury that served as I Disagree’s calling card." The album also features a more organic sound in comparison to her previous album. According to Poppy during an interview with Spin, "for all of us to be in the room together, Justin wanted to make a live record. And he mentioned at the very beginning of it — his exact words were, 'I've never been this little prepared to start an album', which made me very excited." To make the album sound more organic, Poppy and her band recorded it together live to tape.

== Critical reception ==
Professional ratings
Aggregate scores
Source	Rating
AnyDecentMusic?	8.2/10
Metacritic	80/100
Review scores
Source	Rating
AllMusic	3.5/5 stars
Beats Per Minute	80%
Clash	8/10
DIY	5/5 stars
Exclaim!	9/10
Kerrang!	4/5
The Line of Best Fit	9/10
NME	4/5 stars
Pitchfork	7.3/10
Sputnikmusic	4/5

Flux received critical acclaim. At Metacritic, which assigns a normalized rating out of 100 to reviews from mainstream critics, the album has an average score of 80 out of 100, based on eight reviews.

Neil Z. Yeung of AllMusic considered the album to be a "step forward for Poppy's songwriting" and called the album "[her most] authentic and earnest work." Writing for Beats Per Minute, John Wohlmacher stated "Flux is the most direct and unfiltered of Pereira's projects so far. Where her...pop records have explored viral aspects of cultural cosplay, and I Disagree saw her playfully weave medleys that presented nu-metal crossovers with Japanese city pop and 60s psychedelia...Flux manages to highlight to the forgotten influence women had on rock and pop in the 90s..." Shannon Garner of Clash praised the album's musical content and throwback to old sounds stating it is "a scintillating blend of 90s alt-rock and daring 2k21 elements". Emma Swann of DIY praised the album and called it "a great rock album."

Writing for Exclaim!, Rhys Juergensen stated, "[Poppy's] constant need for change — for flux — is, ironically, the very thing that gives her consistency. With this album, Poppy very clearly says that her new niche is to not have a niche. Rhian Daly of The Forty-Five was positive towards the album and stated, "with sonic sugar rushes and eardrum assaults, Poppy's fourth album is the sound of her finding her feet through a big creative shift." Kerrang!'s James Hickie stated that "Poppy triumphs on her deepest and most artistic album to date, Flux". Red Dziri of The Line of Best Fit stated, "her latest album proves that there's simply no boxing her in – despite all the attempts by previous collaborators to keep her contained."

Writing for NME, El Hunt described the album as "determined, fun-filled and perception-defying alt-rock". Brad Sanders writing for Pitchfork stated, "Poppy’s albums have increasingly offered revealing glimpses of the woman behind the mask. Flux is her most unguarded work yet, and it's the closest we've come yet to meeting the real Poppy." Sputnikmusic called it "a wonderfully executed take on 90’s alternative rock and grunge." Paul Brown of Wall of Sound stated, "[this album proves] Poppy has well and truly earned her spot amongst the greats of the alternative scene."

=== Year-end lists ===
Flux on year-end lists
Publication	Accolade	Year	Rank	Ref.
The Boston Globe	The 60 best albums of the year	2021	—	
Kerrang	The 50 best albums of 2021	2021	16	
RIFF Magazine	108 Best Albums of 2021	2021	24	

== Track listing ==
All tracks are produced by Justin Meldal-Johnsen.

Flux track listing
No.	Title	Writer(s)	Length
1.	"Flux"	Chris Greatti; Poppy; Simon Wilcox	5:00
2.	"Lessen the Damage"	Poppy; Wilcox	2:21
3.	"So Mean"	Greatti; Poppy	2:56
4.	"On the Level"	Greatti; Poppy	3:25
5.	"Hysteria"	Justin Meldal-Johnsen; Poppy; Wilcox	4:20
6.	"Her"	Poppy	2:08
7.	"Bloom"	Greatti; Poppy	3:50
8.	"As Strange as It Seems"	Greatti; Poppy	4:05
9.	"Never Find My Place"	Greatti; Poppy	4:00
Total length:			32:11

== Charts ==
Chart performance for Flux
Chart (2021)	Peak position
UK Album Downloads (OCC)	46
UK Independent Albums (OCC)	40
UK Rock & Metal Albums (OCC)	16
US Top Current Album Sales (Billboard)	60

== Release history ==
Release dates and formats for Flux
Region	Date	Format(s)	Label	Ref.
Various	September 24, 2021	CD; digital download; streaming	Sumerian	
Various	November 12, 2021	LP record	Sumerian	
