= Zeche Bochum =

Music venue in Germany

Coordinates: 51.451°N 7.218°E

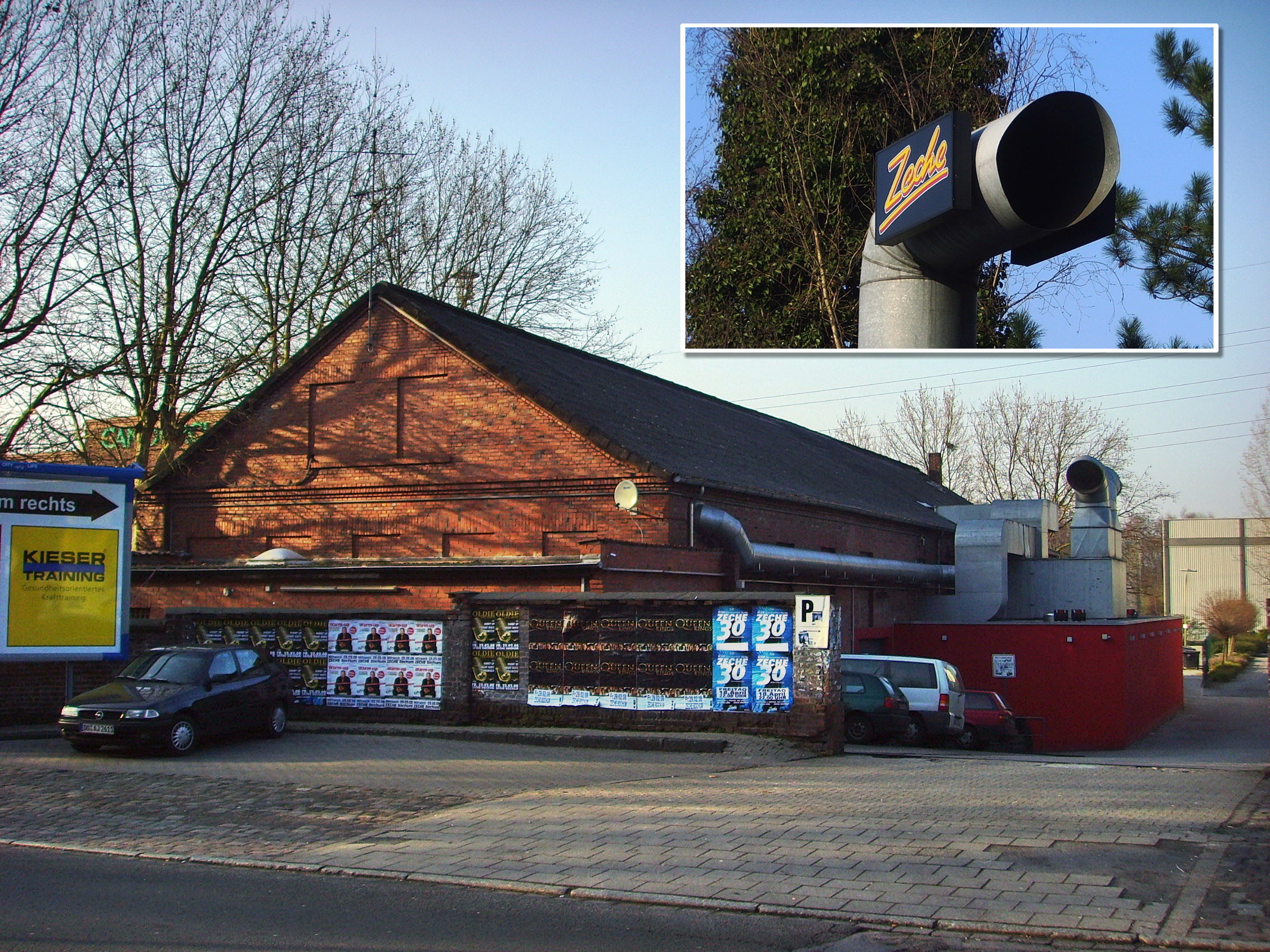
Zeche Bochum

Zeche Bochum is a live music venue located in Bochum, Germany. It opened in 1981 and has hosted notable artists such as Tina Turner, R.E.M., Duran Duran, Poppy and Depeche Mode.
