= I Disagree =

Studio album by Poppy
- Released: January 10, 2020
- Genres: Heavy metal; pop; rock; electronic; industrial
- Length: 35:08; 45:33 (deluxe edition)
- Labels: Sumerian; Warner
- Producers: Chris Greatti; Zakk Cervini

Poppy chronology
Choke (2019)	I Disagree (2020)	Eat (NXT Soundtrack) (2021)

Singles from I Disagree
- 1. "Concrete" Released: August 22, 2019; 2. "I Disagree" Released: October 4, 2019; 3. "Bloodmoney" Released: November 6, 2019; 4. "Fill the Crown" Released: December 11, 2019

I Disagree (More)

Singles from I Disagree (More)
- 1. "Khaos x4" Released: July 28, 2020

I Disagree is the third studio album by American singer-songwriter Poppy. It was released on January 10, 2020, as her first album with Sumerian Records following her departure from Mad Decent, as well as her final collaborative project with Titanic Sinclair before the end of their creative partnership in 2019. Moving away from the dance-pop sound of her previous records, I Disagree represents a complete sonic shift for Poppy, incorporating elements of heavy metal, nu metal, industrial rock and avant-grade pop. Described by Poppy as a "post-genre" record, the album is built around themes of empowerment, liberation and institutional defiance.

The album received generally positive reviews from music critics, praising Poppy's new direction in music. It was supported by four singles, including the Grammy nominated "Bloodmoney" (2019). A deluxe edition of the album titled I Disagree (More) was released on August 21, 2020.

I Disagree debuted at number 130 on the Billboard 200 for the week of January 25, marking Poppy's first entry on the chart. The album also experienced moderate chart success in Australia and the United Kingdom, debuting atop the Rock & Metal Albums Chart in the latter.

== Background and release ==
Poppy rose to fame in 2015 when she starred in her own performance art videos on YouTube where she also mocked popular culture. She used to be known for her robotic persona. Signing to different labels, she released several projects that mostly featured electro-pop and bubblegum-pop sounds. Her second studio album Am I a Girl? was released in late 2018. On the second half of the record, Poppy began experimenting with nu metal, shortly after, she released Choke in 2019 as a continuation to Am I a Girl?'s second half. Her image started to change around that time, as she ditched the pastel colors and started to wear darker outfits, as well as changing her music style. Poppy began working on her third album following the release of her second album. She described it to be "heavy" and called it a "post-genre" record, as well as stating that it's a follow-up to her previous metal songs, specifically "Play Destroy" and "X".

Choke was Poppy's final release under Mad Decent, as her ambient album I C U (Music to Read To) was released in July 2019 under her own label I'm Poppy Records. In August, Poppy signed with Sumerian and released a single titled "Concrete". The next month, Poppy announced the title of her third album to be I Disagree and revealed the official release date and cover art. The album artwork was designed by American visual artist and photographer Jesse Draxler. The title track was released as the second single in October. Poppy performed "I Disagree" live at WWE NXT shortly after its release. "Bloodmoney" was released as the album's third single in November, along with the announcement of a 2020 US tour in support of I Disagree and a music video. It was nominated for "Best Metal Performance" at the 63rd Annual Grammy Awards, becoming Poppy's first grammy nomination. The track list of I Disagree was revealed on November 26, 2019 via Poppy's social media. The fourth single, "Fill the Crown" was released in December. Its official music video was heavily inspired by the 1957 film The Seventh Seal. It was also announced that Poppy would part ways with her collaborator Titanic Sinclair.

The fourth track on the album, "Anything Like Me" received a black and white music video, and was released on the same day as the album. It was directed by Jesse Draxler and co-directed by Poppy. Another music video from the album for "Sit / Stay" was released in March, and was fully directed by Poppy. In April, Sumerian announced through an Instagram livestream that a deluxe version of I Disagree would be released in the summer. In July, a song called "Khaos x4" was released as the fifth and final single from the album, followed by the announcement of a deluxe edition of the album called I Disagree (More). The reissue was released in August and featured four additional tracks including the album's fifth single.

To promote the album, Poppy embarked on the Threesome Tour along with Bring Me the Horizon and Sleeping with Sirens, and the later I Disagree Tour, the Eurasia dates of which were canceled due to the COVID-19 pandemic.

== Composition ==
I Disagree has been described as an avant-garde, heavy metal, pop, pop-metal, electropop, industrial rock, rock, nu metal, hyperpop, kawaii metal, hard rock, and industrial record.

The album incorporated elements of art pop, dubstep, experimental pop, industrial metal, alternative metal, progressive metal, thrash metal, electronic, metalcore, deathcore, post-grunge, progressive rock, pop-punk, dream pop, bubblegum pop, alt-pop, acoustic pop, R&B, J-pop, and K-pop.

Speaking in an interview with Kerrang!, Poppy said "I've never said my music is metal, but I do listen to that music."

== Reception ==
Professional ratings
Aggregate scores
Source	Rating
AnyDecentMusic?	6.6/10
Metacritic	72/100
Review scores
Source	Rating
AllMusic	4/5 stars
Exclaim!	5/10
Gigwise	9/10 stars
The Guardian	3/5 stars
MusicOMH	4/5 stars
NME	4/5 stars
The Observer	3/5 stars
Pitchfork	6.5/10
PopMatters	7/10
Slant Magazine	3.5/5 stars

I Disagree received positive reviews from critics. At Metacritic, which assigns a normalized rating out of 100 to reviews from mainstream critics, the album has an average score of 72 out of 100, which indicates "Generally favorable reviews" based on 16 reviews.

AllMusic writer Neil Z. Yeung also gave the album a positive rating, writing that "As both a symbolic avatar for her life changes and a strong empowerment statement, I Disagree celebrates Poppy's rebirth as a pop-metal alchemist and unabashed rule-breaker." Josh Gray of Clash opined that "Poppy remains a daring and divisive artist making daring and divisive art, and I Disagree is the perfect shot of adrenaline to kick start a new decade with." Malvika Padin of Gigwise called the album "A true masterpiece in almost every way imaginable..." and "...the perfect album to start 2020 with."

While talking positively about the album, Nicoletta Wylde of musicOMH stated, "with I Disagree, Poppy releases her version of Lemonade; both channelling the pain of her recent controversy, sticking two fingers up to the past and translating her performance art into music." Ali Shutler of NME praised I Disagree as "her most accomplished record, full of daring theatre and snarling forward motion". Tara Joshi of The Observer called it "a cartoonish record that is at once garish, sweet and over the top...enjoyable, imaginative and at times uncanny assault on the senses." Colin Joyce writing for Pitchfork stated, "none of the situations she explores are especially specific, but it’s striking...reminder that chaos can be cleansing, that calamity is the first step to starting all over again and building something new."

Elisabeth Woronzoff of PopMatters considered the album to be "a major shift from her previous endeavors...[as] she has expanded her musicality while also challenging genre conventions." In discussing the sound of the album, Sal Cinquemani of Slant Magazine stated, "the album tosses the singer’s pop aesthetic into the shredder with heavy metal and industrial rock...the album...evokes Rammstein, Sleigh Bells, and Lady Gaga—but it’s regurgitated and repackaged in a way that manages to escape derivativeness."

In June 2020, I Disagree was included in Spin's 30 best albums of 2020 so far.

=== Year-end lists ===
Publication	Accolade	Year	Rank	Ref.
Upset Magazine	Albums Of The Year	2020	1	
Revolver	25 Best Albums of 2020	2020	12	
Gigwise	The Gigwise 51 Best Albums of 2020	2020	20	
Spin Magazine	The 30 Best Albums of 2020	2020	23	
Kerrang	The 50 greatest albums of 2020	2020	23	
The Plain Dealer	Best Albums of 2020	2020	46	
RIFF Magazine	75 Best Albums of 2020	2020	45	
Slant Magazine	The 50 Best Albums of 2020	2020	45	
Alternative Press	50 Best Albums of 2020	2020	-	
AllMusic	All Music Best Of 2020	2020	-	

== Track listing ==
All tracks are written by Chris Greatti, Poppy, Zakk Cervini, and Titanic Sinclair, except where noted. All tracks are produced by Greatti and Cervini.

I Disagree track listing
No.	Title	Length
1.	"Concrete"	3:20
2.	"I Disagree"	3:13
3.	"Bloodmoney"	3:02
4.	"Anything Like Me"	3:19
5.	"Fill the Crown"	3:32
6.	"Nothing I Need"	2:49
7.	"Sit/Stay"	3:54
8.	"Bite Your Teeth"	2:42
9.	"Sick of the Sun"	3:11
10.	"Don't Go Outside"	6:06
Total length:		35:08

I Disagree (More) bonus tracks
No.	Title	Writer(s)	Length
11.	"If It Bleeds"	Greatti; Poppy	2:41
12.	"Bleep Bloop"	Greatti; Poppy; Cervini	1:58
13.	"Khaos x4"	Greatti; Poppy; Cervini	2:57
14.	"Don't Ask"	Greatti; Poppy; Cervini	2:49
Total length:			45:33

== Charts ==
Chart performance for I Disagree
Chart (2020–21)	Peak position
Australian Digital Albums (ARIA)	19
Scottish Albums (Official Charts)	67
UK Album Downloads (Official Charts)	37
UK Independent Albums (Official Charts)	11
UK Rock & Metal Albums (Official Charts)	1
US Billboard 200	130
US Top Current Album Sales (Billboard)	81
US Independent Albums (Billboard)	12
US Top Hard Rock Albums (Billboard)	5
US Top Rock Albums (Billboard)	15

Chart performance for I Disagree (More)
Chart (2021)	Peak position
UK Independent Album Breakers (OCC)	19

== Release history ==
Release dates and formats for I Disagree
Region	Date	Formats	Edition	Label	Ref.
Various	January 10, 2020	CD; digital download; streaming; vinyl	I Disagree	Sumerian	
Various	August 14, 2020	Digital download; streaming; vinyl	I Disagree (More)	Sumerian	

== See also ==
- List of 2020 albums
