= Titanic Sinclair =

American musician and YouTube personality (born 1987)

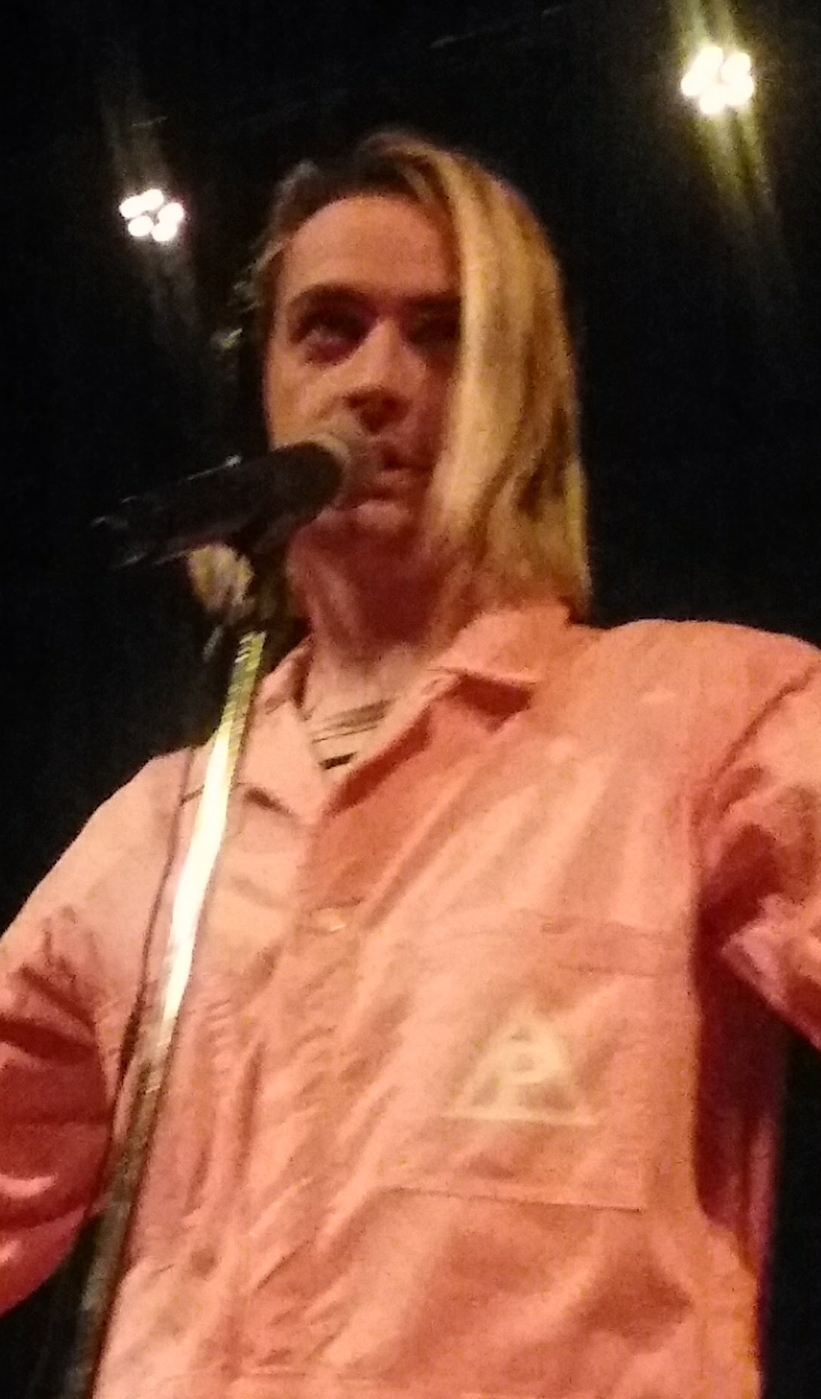
- Mixter during the Poppy.Computer Tour at The Cedar Cultural Center in 2018
- Born: Corey Michael Mixter; February 12, 1987 (age 39); Saginaw, Michigan, U.S.
- Occupations: Director; musician; internet personality
- Years active: 2006–present
- Musical career
- Genres: Indie rock; rock; ambient; country
- Instruments: Vocals; guitar

YouTube information
- Channel: titanicsinclair
- Years active: 2009–present
- Subscribers: 112,000
- Views: 12.9 million
- Last updated: July 6, 2026

Corey Michael Mixter (born February 12, 1987), known professionally under his pseudonym Titanic Sinclair, is an American internet personality. He was previously one-half of the indie pop duo Mars Argo and a former creative collaborator of American singer and YouTube personality Poppy.

== Collaborations ==
From 2009 to 2014, Sinclair directed and wrote the video content for the Mars Argo internet series Computer Show on YouTube. Sinclair also wrote and produced the duo's musical albums they released independently.

In 2010, Sinclair directed the music video for Stepdad's song "My Leather, My Fur, My Nails".

Sinclair was commissioned to create an acoustic video series for singer/musician Børns. One video featured LA singer/songwriter Zella Day. The videos featured music from Børns' first EP titled Candy which Sinclair also provided the EP artwork for.

After moving to Los Angeles in 2013 to pursue a musical career, Poppy collaborated with Sinclair on a long series of abstract performance art, music, and promotional videos on YouTube which presented Poppy as a mysterious, not-quite-human internet-created character. Sinclair and Poppy then worked together on writing songs, creating albums, a concert tour, a YouTube Red internet show, and their continuing series of several hundred YouTube videos. In June 2018, the pair launched Poppy.Church, an interactive fan site.

In August 2016, Sinclair directed the music video for the Knox Hamilton song titled "Washed Up Together".

In June 2019, Sinclair directed the music video for rapper Vic Mensa's song "Camp America".

== Controversies ==
=== Mars Argo lawsuit ===
On April 17, 2018, Sinclair's former collaborator and partner Mars Argo filed a lawsuit in federal court against Sinclair and Poppy alleging copyright infringement, stating that Sinclair based Poppy's online persona on hers, as well as emotional and physical abuse Sinclair had allegedly subjected her to in the period after their separation and the subsequent abandonment of the project. On May 7, Poppy made a public statement about the "frivolous" lawsuit, saying Argo was attempting to manipulate her psychologically and that Mars was working with a person who had allegedly abused Poppy in the past, Josh Moran. She called the suit a "publicity campaign" and a "desperate grab for fame". It was settled out of court on September 14 "with no money exchanging hands". Argo released a statement in January 2019 that all rights to Mars Argo had been assigned to her as part of the settlement.

=== Poppy ===
On December 29, 2019, Poppy released a statement on Twitter announcing that she parted ways with Sinclair, claiming that he "glamorizes suicide" and used it as a way to manipulate her. An example of this behavior is an instance in which Poppy alleges Sinclair was going to hang himself with one of her personal belongings and had also messaged fans details about his suicidal attempts for attention. She said that Sinclair "lives an illusion that he is a gift to this Earth" and that she was "trapped in a mess that [she] needed to dig [her]self out of." Prior to the statement, some of Sinclair's directorial credits were removed from recent music videos on Poppy's YouTube channel, with his songwriting credits later being removed from selected songs on streaming platforms.

== Discography ==
=== Studio albums ===
List of studio albums
Title	Details
Thick Jello	Released: December 5, 2012; Label: Independent; Format: Digital download
I Have Teeth	Released: June 28, 2014; Label: Independent; Format: Digital download
Texas Dream	Released: October 31, 2021; Label: Independent; Format: Digital download
Duh	Released: August 30, 2024; Label: Independent; Format: Digital download
Randy Speedboat	Released: May 14, 2025; Label: Independent; Format: Digital download
Tight Annex Sink Layer	Released: September 19, 2025; Label: Independent; Format: Digital download

=== EPs ===
List of studio albums
Title	Details
Christmas Singalong	Released: December 16, 2021; Label: Independent; Format: Digital download

=== Singles ===
List of singles, showing year released and album name
Title	Year	Album
"Trust Fund"	2015	Non-album singles
"Fucking on Fire"	2015	Non-album singles
"Losing My Mind"	2016	Non-album singles
"Broken Boy"	2020	Non-album singles
"Scorpio"	2020	Non-album singles
"Texas Dream"	2020	Texas Dream
"We Danced All Night"	2021	Texas Dream
"Señorita"	2021	Texas Dream
"I Want to Fuck You"	2022	Non-album singles
"It's a Boy"	2022	Non-album singles
"I Can't Tell"	2022	Non-album singles
"Your Horoscope"	2022	Duh
"I'm Glad (It's Christmas)"	2023	Non-album single
"Next Big Thing"	2024	Duh
"Pixie Chick"	2024	Duh
"Speakin' in Tongues"	2025	Randy Speedboat
"Puzzle Piece"	2025	Randy Speedboat

== Songwriting credits ==
Song	Year	Artist(s)	Album
"The Singularity is Near"	2009	Mars Argo	Technology Is a Dead Bird
"Suicide Birds"	2009	Mars Argo	Technology Is a Dead Bird
"Mrs. Stadler"	2009	Mars Argo	Technology Is a Dead Bird
"Machine"	2009	Mars Argo	Technology Is a Dead Bird
"Monsters Under My Bed"	2009	Mars Argo	Technology Is a Dead Bird
"Technology Is a Dead Bird"	2009	Mars Argo	Technology Is a Dead Bird
"Sideways and Sideways"	2009	Mars Argo	Technology Is a Dead Bird
"You Don't Know Me Anymore"	2009	Mars Argo	Technology Is a Dead Bird
"Feeling Welcome in a Time Warp"	2009	Mars Argo	Technology Is a Dead Bird
"Tired Today"	2009	Mars Argo	Technology Is a Dead Bird
"Electric Car"	2010	Mars Argo	Internet Sessions
"Everything Turns to Gold"	2010	Mars Argo	Internet Sessions
"A-Okay"	2011	Mars Argo	Linden Place
"Formal Girl"	2011	Mars Argo	Linden Place
"Beauty is Empty"	2011	Mars Argo	Linden Place
"Using You"	2011	Mars Argo	Linden Place
"Love in Black and White"	2011	Mars Argo	Linden Place
"Nothing Without You"	2011	Mars Argo	Mars Argo
"Pls Don't Forget Me"	2011	Mars Argo	Non-album single
"Runaway Runaway"	2012	Mars Argo	Runaway Runaway – Single
"Stuck on You"	2012	Mars Argo	Runaway Runaway – Single
"Won't Change"	2014	501, Protohype, Ras	Crystallize
"Dopamine"	2015	BØRNS	Dopamine
"Overnight Sensation"	2015	BØRNS	Dopamine
"Everybody Wants to Be Poppy"	2015	Poppy	Non-album single
"Money"	2016	Poppy	Bubblebath
"American Kids"	2016	Poppy	Bubblebath
"I'm Poppy"	2017	Poppy	Poppy.Computer
"Let's Make a Video"	2017	Poppy	Poppy.Computer
"Bleach Blonde Baby"	2017	Poppy	Poppy.Computer
"My Style"	2017	Poppy	Poppy.Computer
"Interweb"	2017	Poppy	Poppy.Computer
"Software Upgrade"	2017	Poppy	Poppy.Computer
"Pop Music"	2017	Poppy	Poppy.Computer
"Immature Couture"	2018	Poppy	Non-album single
"Fashion After All"	2018	Poppy	Am I a Girl?
"Iconic"	2018	Poppy	Am I a Girl?
"Chic Chick"	2018	Poppy	Am I a Girl?
"Time is Up"	2018	Poppy	Am I a Girl?
"Aristocrat"	2018	Poppy	Am I a Girl?
"Hard Feelings"	2018	Poppy	Am I a Girl?
"Girls in Bikinis"	2018	Poppy	Am I a Girl?
"The Rapture Ball"	2018	Poppy	Am I a Girl?
"Am I a Girl?"	2018	Poppy	Am I a Girl?
"X"	2018	Poppy	Am I a Girl?
"Choke"	2019	Poppy	Choke
"Voicemail"	2019	Poppy	Choke
"Scary Mask"	2019	Poppy	Choke
"Meat"	2019	Poppy	Choke
"The Holy Mountain"	2019	Poppy	Choke
"Concrete"	2019	Poppy	I Disagree
"I Disagree"	2019	Poppy	I Disagree
"Bloodmoney"	2019	Poppy	I Disagree
"Fill The Crown"	2019	Poppy	I Disagree
"Anything Like Me"	2020	Poppy	I Disagree
"Sit / Stay"	2020	Poppy	I Disagree
"Bite Your Teeth"	2020	Poppy	I Disagree
"Sick of the Sun"	2020	Poppy	I Disagree
"Don't Go Outside"	2020	Poppy	I Disagree
