= Bad Omens discography =

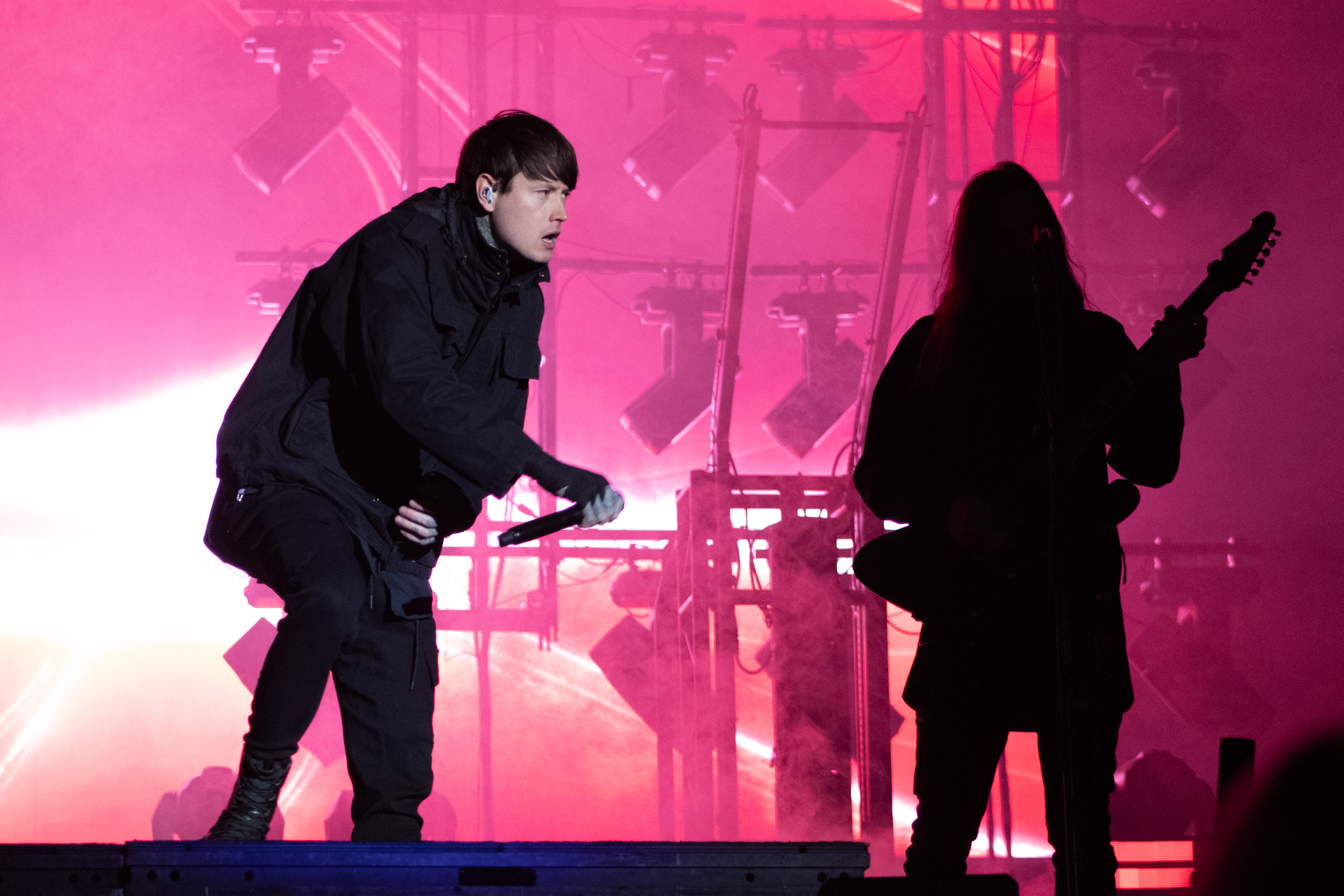
- Bad Omens in 2023
- Studio albums: 3
- EPs: 1
- Live albums: 1
- Compilation albums: 1
- Singles: 26
- Music videos: 20

The American heavy metal band Bad Omens have released three studio albums, one compilation, one extended play, one live album, 26 singles (including two as a featured guest), and 20 music videos.

== Albums ==
=== Studio albums ===
List of studio albums, with selected details and peak chart positions
Title	Album details	Peak chart positions						Sales	Certifications
Title	Album details	US Heat.	US Ind.	US Hard Rock	US Rock	AUS	UK Rock	Sales	Certifications
Bad Omens	Released: August 19, 2016; Label: Sumerian; Formats: CD, LP, DL	9	30	13	43	—	—		
Finding God Before God Finds Me	Released: August 2, 2019; Label: Sumerian; Formats: CD, LP, DL	4	12	—	—	—	—		
The Death of Peace of Mind	Released: February 25, 2022; Label: Sumerian; Formats: CD, 2LP, CS, DL	1	34	11	44	14	24	US: 948,000	RIAA: Gold; BPI: Gold
"—" denotes a release that did not chart or was not issued in that region.

=== Compilation albums ===
List of compilation albums, with selected details and peak chart positions
Title	Album details	Peak chart positions		
Title	Album details	US Heat.	US Hard Rock	UK Rock
Concrete Jungle (The OST)	Released: May 31, 2024; Label: Sumerian; Formats: DL, LP	6	22	38

== Singles ==
=== As lead artist ===
List of singles as lead artist, with selected chart positions and certifications, showing year released and album name
Title	Year	Peak chart positions										Certifications	Album
Title	Year	US Bub.	US Rock Air.	US Rock	US Alt.	US Main.	US Hard Rock Dig.	US Hard Rock	CAN Rock	UK Sales	UK Rock	Certifications	Album
"Glass Houses"	2015	—	—	—	—	—	—	—	—	—	—		Bad Omens
"Exit Wounds"	2016	—	—	—	—	—	—	—	—	—	—		Bad Omens
"The Worst in Me"	2016	—	—	—	—	—	—	—	—	—	—		Bad Omens
"The Fountain"	2016	—	—	—	—	—	—	—	—	—	—		Bad Omens
"Careful What You Wish For"	2018	—	—	—	—	—	—	—	—	—	—		Finding God Before God Finds Me
"The Hell I Overcame"	2018	—	—	—	—	—	—	—	—	—	—		Finding God Before God Finds Me
"Burning Out"	2019	—	—	—	—	—	—	—	—	—	—		Finding God Before God Finds Me
"Said & Done"	2019	—	—	—	—	—	—	—	—	—	—		Finding God Before God Finds Me
"Limits"	2020	—	—	—	—	19	—	—	—	— (Note: "Limits" did not enter the UK Singles Sales Chart, but peaked at number 11 on the UK Physical Singles Chart.)	—	RIAA: Gold	Finding God Before God Finds Me
"Never Know"	2021	—	—	—	—	25	—	—	—	—	—		Finding God Before God Finds Me
"What Do You Want from Me?" / "Artificial Suicide"	2021	—	—	—	—	—	—	22	—	—	—		The Death of Peace of Mind
"Like a Villain"	2022	—	32	—	—	10	17	—	—	—	—	RIAA: Gold; BPI: Silver	The Death of Peace of Mind
"The Grey"	2022	—	—	—	—	—	—	—	—	—	—		The Death of Peace of Mind
"Nowhere to Go"	2022	—	—	—	—	—	—	20	—	—	—	RIAA: Gold	The Death of Peace of Mind
"Just Pretend"	2022	— (Note: "Just Pretend" did not enter the Bubbling Under Hot 100, but peaked at number 23 on the US Digital Songs chart.)	4	11	1	1	1	1	18	—	26	RIAA: 2x Platinum; BPI: Silver; RMNZ: Gold	The Death of Peace of Mind
"The Death of Peace of Mind"	2023	—	7	30	10	2	7	2	—	—	—	RIAA: Gold; BPI: Silver	The Death of Peace of Mind
"V.A.N" (with Poppy)	2024	—	40	39	—	9	1	2	—	88	25		Concrete Jungle (The OST)
"The Drain" (with Health and Swarm)	2024	—	—	—	—	—	6	7	—	—	—		Concrete Jungle (The OST)
"Anything > Human" (with Erra)	2024	—	—	—	—	—	10	18	—	—	—		Concrete Jungle (The OST)
"Specter"	2025	16	3	19	13	1	1	1	— (Note: "Specter" did not register on the Canadian Rock chart, but peaked at number 21 on the Canadian Digital Song Sales component chart.)	41	17		TBA
"Impose"	2025	—	—	— (Note: "Impose" did not enter the Hot Rock Songs chart, but peaked at number 15 on the Rock Digital Songs chart.)	— (Note: "Impose" did not enter the Alternative Airplay chart, but peaked at number 8 on the Alternative Digital Songs chart.)	—	—	—	—	—	—		TBA
"Dying to Love"	2025	— (Note: "Dying to Love" did not enter the Bubbling Under Hot 100, but peaked at number 23 on the US Digital Songs chart.)	9	22	14	1	1	2	17	70	22		TBA
"Left for Good"	2025	—	—	23	— (Note: "Left for Good" did not enter the Alternative Airplay chart, but peaked at number 3 on the Alternative Digital Songs chart.)	—	2	5	—	55	20		TBA
"—" denotes a recording that did not chart or was not released in that territory.

=== As featured artist ===
Title	Year	Peak chart positions	Album
Title	Year	US Hot Hard Rock	Album
"Suffocate" (Kayzo and Bad Omens)	2020	—	Non-album single
"Novocaine" (Too Close to Touch featuring Bad Omens)	2024	10	For Keeps

== Music videos ==
List of music videos, showing year released, album and director
Title	Year	Album	Director(s)	Link
"Glass Houses"	2015	Bad Omens	Orie McGinness	
"Exit Wounds"	2016	Bad Omens	Orie McGinness	
"The Worst in Me"	2016	Bad Omens	Orie McGinness	
"The Fountain"	2016	Bad Omens	Orie McGinness	
"Careful What You Wish For"	2018	Finding God Before God Finds Me	Orie McGinness	
"The Hell I Overcame"	2018	Finding God Before God Finds Me	Orie McGinness	
"Burning Out"	2019	Finding God Before God Finds Me	Orie McGinness	
"Dethrone"	2019	Finding God Before God Finds Me	Orie McGinness and Noah Sebastian	
"Limits"	2020	Finding God Before God Finds Me	Orie McGinness	
"The Death of Peace of Mind"	2021	The Death of Peace of Mind	Orie McGinness	
"Artificial Suicide"	2022	The Death of Peace of Mind	Orie McGinness	
"Like a Villain"	2022	The Death of Peace of Mind	Orie McGinness	
"Nowhere to Go"	2022	The Death of Peace of Mind	Orie McGinness	
"Concrete Jungle"	2022	The Death of Peace of Mind	Orie McGinness	
"Just Pretend"	2023	The Death of Peace of Mind	Erik Rojas	
"V.A.N"	2024	Concrete Jungle [The OST]	Garrett Nicholson and Poppy	
"Specter"	2025	TBA	Noah Sebastian and Nico Poalillo	
"Impose"	2025	TBA	Noah Sebastian and Nico Poalillo	
"Dying to Love"	2025	TBA	Noah Sebastian and Nico Poalillo	
"Left for Good"	2025	TBA	Noah Sebastian and Nico Poalillo	
