= Nathan Yocum =

American writer

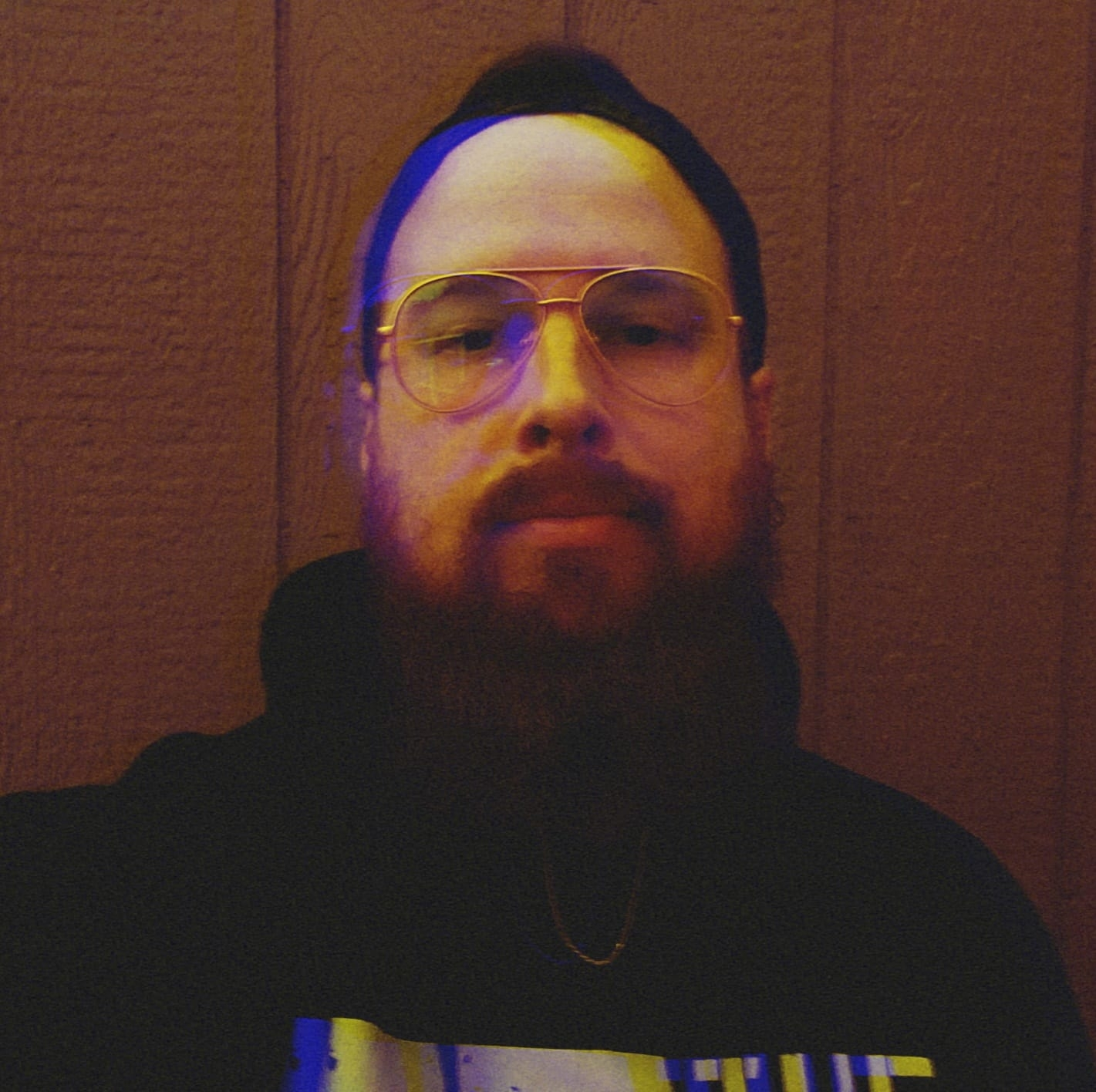
- Nathan Yocum in 2022
- Born: Nathan Michael Yocum; June 1, 1992 (age 34); Wylie, Texas, United States
- Occupations: Publisher; Writer; Film producer
- Years active: 2020–present
- Notable work: Axl Rose: Appetite for Destruction; Interpol: Antics; Anberlin: Godspeed; Tony Hawk's: American Fallout; Stand Atlantic: in 2D
- Website: sumerian.com nathan.wiki

Nathan Yocum is an American publisher, writer and film producer. Yocum is the co-founder and president of Sumerian Publishing Group. The group includes Sumerian Comics, the relaunched rock magazine Hit Parader, and the satirical publication The Hard Times. Yocum has also partnered on the relaunch of Penthouse Comics and served as associate producer on the 2025 theatrical film Queen of the Ring.

== Biography ==
Yocum co-founded Behemoth Comics in 2020 with business partner Ryan Swanson. The independent publisher, initially based in the Dallas area before relocating operations to Nashville, Tennessee, specialized in comic books and graphic novels, often drawing on licenses from film, video games and the music industry. Early titles included collaborations with Ubisoft and partnerships with artists tied to metal and alternative music scenes. By 2021 the company had achieved a notable position in the direct market, with reported annual sales exceeding 500,000 units.

In March 2022 Sumerian Records & Films acquired Behemoth Entertainment. The comic publishing division was rebranded Sumerian Comics in July 2022 and integrated into the broader Sumerian Entertainment Group. Yocum remained as president of the comic operation, serving alongside Swanson. Under the new ownership, Sumerian Comics expanded its slate of licensed properties, releasing graphic novels and comic series based on films such as American Psycho and The Crow, as well as original or tie-in projects with musicians including Bad Omens, Sleep Token, Guns N' Roses, Interpol, Anberlin and Destroy Rebuild Until God Shows.

As co-president of Sumerian Publishing Group, Yocum helped expand the company’s portfolio beyond comics, including the late 2024 acquisition of the satirical news site The Hard Times and its gaming-focused sister publication Hard Drive. In 2025 Yocum relaunched the long-dormant music magazine Hit Parader as a print publication where he serves as editors-in-chief along with Swanson.

In early 2024, Yocum and Swanson partnered with Penthouse Global Licensing to relaunch Penthouse Comics after a nearly thirty-year hiatus. The revived title appears in an oversized magazine format on a bimonthly schedule and has featured contributions from creators such as Guillem March, Matteo Scalera, and Maria Llovet. Yocum has been involved in the editorial and publishing direction of the series.

In film, Yocum has collaborated with Ash Avildsen through Sumerian Pictures, serving as associate producer on the biographical sports drama Queen of the Ring and helping oversee theatrical distribution for Turnstile’s companion film TURNSTILE: NEVER ENOUGH in 2025.

== Bibliography ==
- Destroy Rebuild Until God Shows (co-written with Craig Owens)
- Anberlin: Godspeed (co-written with Deon Rexroat)
- Interpol: Antics
- Tony Hawk's: American Fallout
- Stand Atlantic: in 2D
- Axl rose: Appetite For Destruction
- Scorpions: Hurricane
- Penthouse Comics
  - Penthouse Comics 2024
    - Penthouse Comics #1
    - Penthouse Comics #2
    - Penthouse Comics #3
    - Penthouse Comics #4
    - Penthouse Comics #5
    - Penthouse Comics #6
    - Penthouse Comics 2027 #1
