= Hard Drive (website) =

American satirical gaming journalism website

- Company type: Subsidiary
- Website type: Satirical gaming website
- Available in: English
- Founded: 2017; 9 years ago
- Founders: Matt Saincome; Jeremy Kaplowitz; Mike Amory; Mark Roebuck
- Editors: Kyle Duggan; Matt Fresh
- Industry: Media; Entertainment
- Parent: Sumerian Publishing Group
- Website: hard-drive.net

Hard Drive (stylized in all caps) is an American satirical video game news website co-founded in 2017 by the editors of The Hard Times. Due to their similar writing style, Hard Drive is frequently compared to The Onion and was named 'The Onion of video games' by both Vice and Uproxx.

Hard Drive employs both staff and freelance writers.

== History ==
Hard Drive was created in 2017 as a "spin-off" of The Hard Times, a satirical news website, and was co-founded by the latter's editors: CEO Matt Saincome, Jeremy Kaplowitz, Mike Amory, and Mark Roebuck. After The Hard Times' popularity grew, Saincome wanted to start a dedicated gaming vertical in the same style. Hard Drive articles grew popular and were reposted on Twitter.

In 2019, the website published an article in response to The Onion's new gaming-oriented section, the Onion Gaming Network. Fans believed that it was "stolen" from the premise of Hard Drive. Amory told Newsweek that as The Onion's legacy in satire was where they owed their success, "to say the Onion stole from us is like trying to claim The Beatles ripped you off." A spokesperson of The Onion responded to Newsweek, saying that the vertical was a "new creative venture" and that they believed there was "plenty of room" for multiple gaming satire publications to grow.

After The Hard Times was acquired by the Project M Group in 2020, Saincome and its parent company continue to operate Hard Drive. Editor-in-chief Kaplowitz stepped down in August 2023, replaced by Roebuck, who stepped down in November.

In 2025, Sumerian Entertainment acquired The Hard Times and Hard Drive. Matt Saincome subsequently left the company and it is now ran by Sumerian and the same group of editors.

=== Ace Watkins ===
The website's most popular creation was Ace Watkins, a parodic 2020 United States presidential candidate. Watkins' proposed reforms were expressed through video game-related analogies, and his policies included letting every American have access to a Nintendo Switch.

Ace Watkins was portrayed by actor and comedian Phil Jamesson. The idea originated from a joke by the editors at the 2018 New York Comic Con, where they successfully petitioned for an American 'gamer president' and later ran a Hard Drive article about it. Ace Watkins became a meme on Twitter and its official account amassed two hundred thousand followers in August 2020.

=== Twitter feud with Elon Musk ===
On May 30, 2022, American business magnate Elon Musk retweeted a Hard Drive article with the site and byline cropped out. Hard Drive's editors satirically responded to Musk on Twitter. This began a short-lived online feud—Musk refused to credit them on the basis that memes and similar content should not be credited and that the article in question was subpar, and Hard Drive consequently published a series of satirical articles about him. The incident was mentioned in several gaming publications critical of Musk, who eventually deleted the original post.

== See also ==
- List of satirical news websites
