= Specter (Bad Omens song) =

Single by Bad Omens
- Released: August 8, 2025
- Length: 4:34
- Label: Sumerian
- Songwriters: Noah Sebastian; Joakim Karlsson; Michael Taylor
- Producers: Noah Sebastian; Michael Taylor

Bad Omens singles chronology
"Anything > Human" (2024)	"Specter" (2025)	"Impose" (2025)

Music video
- "Specter" on YouTube

"Specter" is a single by American heavy metal band Bad Omens, released in August 2025 through Sumerian Records. It marks the band's first solo release since their 2022 album The Death of Peace of Mind and the companion EP Concrete Jungle (The OST) (2024).

== Background and release ==
Prior to release, the band teased "Specter" with cryptic social media posts featuring the phrase "goodbye, friend" and surreal visuals, including a child in a ghost costume interacting with actor Ryan Hurst.

== Music video ==
The music video was directed by Noah Sebastian and Nico.

== Live performances ==
The song debuted live on September 20, 2025, at Louder Than Life festival in Louisville, Kentucky.

== Composition ==
Wall of Sound described the song as continuing the band's "signature synth x rock guitar combo".

== Reception ==
Blabbermouth stated the song "builds into a passionate, hard-hitting chorus, complete with ominous, otherworldly electronic flourishes that provide dynamic layers to the song".

== Personnel ==
Bad Omens

- Noah Sebastian – vocals, songwriter, producer, director
- Joakim Karlsson – guitars, songwriter
- Nicholas Ruffilo - bass
- Nick Folio - drums

Production and design

- Michael Taylor – songwriter, producer
- Matt Dierkes – engineering
- Alex Prieto and Matt Dierkes - drum engineering
- Zakk Cervini – mixing and mastering

== Accolades ==
Awards and nominations for "Specter"
Year	Award ceremony	Category	Result	Ref.
2025	Nik Nocturnal Awards	Feels Are Reals	Won	

== Charts ==
=== Weekly charts ===
Weekly chart performance for "Specter"
Chart (2025)	Peak position
Australia Digital Tracks (ARIA)	15
Canada Hot Digital Songs (Billboard)	21
New Zealand Hot Singles (RMNZ)	14
UK Singles Downloads (Official Charts)	40
UK Singles Sales (OCC)	41
UK Indie (Official Charts)	39
UK Rock & Metal (Official Charts)	17
US Bubbling Under Hot 100 (Billboard)	16
US Digital Song Sales (Billboard)	5
US Hot Rock & Alternative Songs (Billboard)	19
US Rock & Alternative Airplay (Billboard)	3

=== Year-end charts ===
Year-end chart performance for "Specter"
Chart (2025)	Position
US Hot Hard Rock Songs (Billboard)	24
US Hot Rock & Alternative Songs (Billboard)	94
