= BrooklynVegan =

American online magazine

- Website type: Online magazine, music blog
- Available in: English
- Founded: July 2004; 22 years ago
- Headquarters: Brooklyn, New York, United States
- Country of origin: United States
- Area served: Worldwide
- Owner: Enrique Abeyta
- Founder: David Levine
- Editor: David Levine
- Industry: Veganism, Music
- Parent: Townsquare Media (2015–2021); Project M Group (2021–2025); Veeps (2025–present)
- Subsidiaries: Invisible Oranges; BV Chicago; BV Austin
- Website: brooklynvegan.com
- Commercial: Yes
- Registration: No
- Launched: August 24, 2004; 22 years ago
- Current status: Active

BrooklynVegan is an American online music magazine founded in July 2004 by David Levine. The company is headquartered in Brooklyn, New York. It originally focused on vegan food and the music community in and around New York City, before broadening its scope to covering musical artists and events worldwide. Since 2011, BrooklynVegan operates two subsidiaries dedicated to other cities: BV Chicago, which serves Chicago, Illinois; and BV Austin, which serves Austin, Texas. As of 2026, the publication is owned by Veeps, a subsidiary of Live Nation.

== History ==
BrooklynVegan began in July 2004 as a blog that also covered vegan food options in Brooklyn, New York before founder and editor-in-chief, Dave Levine, shifted its focus to more exclusively documenting the live music community of the greater New York City area. The domain was purchased by Levine in early 2004, and the first blog article was posted on August 24, 2004.

The blog helps give exposure to new and upcoming artists, such as with its installment in the Artist Discovery Series of blog posts hosted by Austin City Limits and Lollapalooza, and their program on Sirius-XM. The blog also showcases artists at South by Southwest and at CMJ's annual music festival in New York, when in the summer of 2007, they invited the then-self-released Justin Vernon of Bon Iver to play the Bowery Ballroom. At the end of 2008, Stereogum considered it the best music blog of the year. In 2009, BrooklynVegan commissioned American journalist and editor of The Obelisk webzine JJ Koczan to cover Roadburn Festival on their behalf with a series of exclusive articles.

In 2011, BrooklynVegan expanded its locale with two new imprint blogs. BV Chicago was launched in early 2011 and is devoted to Chicago, Illinois, while BV Austin was launched in late 2011 and is devoted to Austin, Texas. On January 4, 2013, BrooklynVegan officially acquired Invisible Oranges, a German-American heavy metal blog, and writer Fred Pessaro, BrooklynVegan's heavy metal journalist, became editor-in-chief of Invisible Oranges.

In July 2015, BrooklynVegan and its three subsidiaries became affiliates of American mass media conglomerate Townsquare Media, under its division Townsquare Music. At the time, Townsquare Music also owned Consequence of Sound, Hype Machine, Ultimate Classic Rock, Loudwire, Gorilla vs. Bear and Noisecreep.

In January 2021, BrooklynVegan and its three subsidiaries were bought out by American digital media brand and e-commerce company Project M Group (which had previously bought out Revolver, The Hard Times, Metal Edge, Inked and Goldmine). As part of the new partnership, BrooklynVegan and Invisible Oranges launched a new webstore selling vinyl records, band shirts and apparel, as well as toys and collectibles. The stores are identical across BrooklynVegan, Invisible Oranges, Revolver, The Hard Times, Metal Edge, Inked and Goldmine, with content controlled and curated by Project M Group. Veeps acquired the site in 2024 or 2025.

In August 2026, Veeps laid off nearly all personnel from BrooklynVegan, alongside those from Alternative Press, Goldmine, and Revolver. The publications' websites remain online, but have largely ended day-to-day operations. Hours after the announcement, and amidst online backlash, Veeps co-founder Joel Madden performed with his band Good Charlotte and Hilary Duff at one of her concerts at Madison Square Garden.
