= Dying to Love =

Single by Bad Omens
- Released: October 22, 2025
- Genre: Metalcore; hard rock
- Length: 4:17
- Label: Sumerian
- Songwriters: Noah Sebastian; Joakim Karlsson; Michael Taylor
- Producers: Noah Sebastian; Joakim Karlsson; Michael Taylor

Bad Omens singles chronology
"Impose" (2025)	"Dying to Love" (2025)	"Left for Good" (2025)

Music video
- "Dying to Love" on YouTube

"Dying to Love" is a single by American heavy metal band Bad Omens, released in October 2025 through Sumerian Records.

== Background and release ==
Following the release of "Specter", Noah Sebastian stated in an interview with 93X radio that he was in the process of writing the band's next studio album, with potentially enough material for two records. On October 20, the band posted a teaser for the single and its music video with the caption "Heaven isn't quite what it seems".

== Music video ==
The music video was directed by Noah Sebastian and Nico Poalillo and has been described as dark, haunting, and brooding. The video depicts the band in an abandoned brutalist concrete structure and a man in a "labyrinth of darkness".

== Live performances ==
The song debuted live on November 21, 2025, in Dublin at the first show from the band's Do You Feel Love Europe tour.

== Composition and reception ==
"Dying to Love" has been described as metalcore, rock and anthemic with influences from electronic music. Blabbermouth stated the song was "anthemic" and "blends the group's heavy roots with forward-thinking production".

It reached No. 1 on the Billboard Mainstream Rock Airplay chart on February 14, 2026, their second song to do so.

== Personnel ==
Credits adapted from Tidal.

Bad Omens

- Noah Sebastian – vocals, songwriter, producer
- Joakim Karlsson – guitars, songwriter
- Nicholas Ruffilo – bass
- Nick Folio – drums

Production

- Michael Taylor – songwriter, producer
- Zakk Cervini – mastering and mixing engineer
- Matt Dierkes – recording and sound engineer
- Alex Prieto – sound engineer
- Austin Brown – assistant sound engineer
- Julian Gargiulo – assistant mixing and sound engineer

== Accolades ==
Awards and nominations for "Dying to Love"
Year	Award ceremony	Category	Result	Ref.
2025	Nik Nocturnal Awards	Radio Song of the Year	Nominated	

== Charts ==
Chart performance for "Dying to Love"
Chart (2025–2026)	Peak position
Canada Mainstream Rock (Billboard Canada)	11
Germany Airplay (TopHit)	57
New Zealand Hot Singles (RMNZ)	38
US Digital Song Sales (Billboard)	23
US Rock & Alternative Airplay (Billboard)	9
US Hot Rock & Alternative Songs (Billboard)	22
US Mainstream Rock Airplay (Billboard)	1
UK Singles Sales (OCC)	70
UK Rock & Metal (OCC)	22
UK Singles Downloads (OCC)	68
UK Indie Breakers (OCC)	11
