= Hard Drive =

A hard disk drive is a computer storage device containing rigid rotating platters.

Hard Drive may also refer to:

- Solid-state drive, a computer storage device that has no moving parts
- Hard Drive (The Sorry Kisses album), a 2008 album by The Sorry Kisses
- Hard Drive (Art Blakey album), a 1957 album by Art Blakey and the Jazz Messengers
- Hard Drive (G.I. Joe), a fictional character in the G.I. Joe universe
- HardDrive (radio show), a rock radio show
- Hard Drive, a 1993 techno-thriller novel by David Pogue
- Hard Drive (film), a film starring John Cusack
- Hard Drive (website), a satirical video game news site published by The Hard Times

== See also ==
- Hardrive, an American garage house production and remix team better known as Masters at Work
