= Hit Parader =

American music magazine (1942–present)

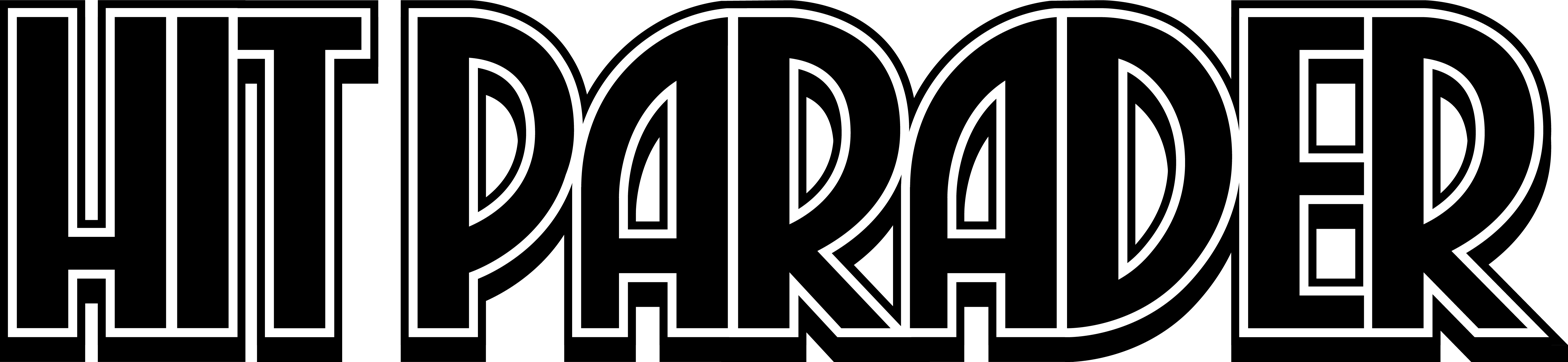

- October 2025 (#1 revival) issue featuring Yungblud
- Editor: Nathan Yocum Ryan Swanson
- Categories: Music magazine
- Frequency: Monthly
- Publisher: Sumerian Publishing Group
- First issue: September 16, 1942 (original); October 2025 (relaunch)
- Final issue: December 2008 (original)
- Country: United States
- Based in: Nashville, Tennessee
- Language: English
- Website: hitparader.com
- ISSN: 0162-0266

Hit Parader is an American music magazine that operated originally between 1942 and 2008 before being relaunched in 2025. A monthly publication, it focused on rock and pop music in general until the 1970s, when its focus began turning to hard rock and heavy metal. By the early 1980s, Hit Parader focused exclusively on heavy metal and briefly produced a spinoff television program entitled Hit Parader's Heavy Metal Heroes. The magazine reached its circulation peak in the mid-to-late 1980s, selling a half-million copies every month, as heavy metal music achieved high levels of popularity and commercial success. The recent relaunch features Yungblud on the inaugural cover and focuses once again on rock and pop music and rock culture as a whole.

== History ==
=== Early years ===
Hit Parader was launched in 1942 by Charlton Publications, based in Derby, Connecticut. Publishing its first issue on September 16, 1942, the magazine's original mission statement read as follows:

Hit Parader is designed to appeal to boys and girls in school, in colleges, and in the armed services... and the millions who listen to radio every day, the people who go to the movies and dances, the jukebox addicts, the people who buy phonograph records and sheet music for home use, and even the people who whistle while they work.

Along with the likes of Billboard, DownBeat and Song Hits, Hit Parader was among the first and longest-lasting American music magazines. The magazine's title referenced the popular music "hit parade", a list of current hit singles determined either by sales or airplay. In its early years, the magazine largely consisted of lyrics to the hit songs of the day, a practice that remained until 1975 when licensing of the rights became too expensive. From that point onward it featured interviews, color photos, and feature articles on popular rock musicians.

=== Emergence of rock music ===
For much of the 1960s, Jim Delehant worked as a staff writer and editor for the magazine. According to his recollection, Hit Parader covered "an extremely boring music scene" in the early 60s prior to the emergence of hugely popular rock groups such as the Beatles and the Beach Boys in 1964. At that time, it was a common practice among music magazines to write fake articles pieced together from sources such as bios and publicity material distributed by the record companies. Hit Parader employed traveling rock journalists who spent time with the artists and wrote legitimate feature articles about them. In addition to Delehant's contributions, Hit Parader also published articles by music journalists Ellen Sander, Keith Altham and Derek Taylor. Over the following decade, its contributors included Nick Logan, Barbara Charone, Lenny Kaye, Jonh Ingham, and Alan Betrock.

=== Transition from rock to punk and new wave ===
During the 1970s, Hit Parader frequently covered rock acts such as Led Zeppelin, the Rolling Stones, Elton John, David Bowie, Blue Öyster Cult, the Kinks, Three Dog Night, the Who, Cheap Trick, Kiss, and Van Halen. As the decade progressed the magazine began covering punk and new wave artists as well. The magazine typically featured song lyrics, artist photos, feature articles, album reviews, interviews, reader mail, bits of trivia on popular rock acts, and readers' polls.

=== Secher era ===
Longtime editor Andy Secher joined the magazine as an assistant editor in 1979 when the staff consisted of essentially two people. Secher was hired on the strength of an interview he had done with AC/DC which appeared in the New York Daily News and has said that Hit Parader's mission at that time was to simply survive month to month. During this period, editor Lisa Robinson had begun taking the magazine in the direction of new wave music, traveling to England four times a year to interview the Clash and positioning Hit Parader to be on the cutting edge of what Secher would later refer to as "the whole Avant-Garde, New Wave movement". The magazine struggled, printing 200,000 monthly copies but only selling approximately 30% of them. In 1980 Secher replaced Robinson as the magazine's editor and Shelton Ivany came on board as editor-in-chief, and it was under their leadership that Hit Parader moved away from new wave music for good, becoming the first monthly publication to focus exclusively on hard rock and heavy metal.

"...we were the first magazine in the world to focus exclusively on hard rock/heavy metal. We were a bit lucky in that the New Wave of British Heavy Metal was just kicking in, and the West Coast Metal Explosion was about to launch. Our timing was very good. We've stayed loyal to hard rock throughout the years because that's where my interest remains. Trends, bands and fans have come and gone, but hard rock has stayed strong." - Andy Secher in 2004

The move paid immediate dividends and Hit Parader began selling a half-million copies every month, a 450% increase in sales. Secher recognized the magazine's target demographic as the young suburban male, whom he referred to as "some 17-year-old kid in Iowa, not a socialite in Manhattan", and attributed Hit Parader's longevity and success to its ability to anticipate trends in music months in advance.

By 1984, the magazine was focusing solely on heavy metal. The magazine's top-selling issue of all time was its June 1984 issue which was the first cover story devoted to a rising band from Los Angeles called Mötley Crüe. Upon arriving in Mexico in December 1983 to interview the band, Secher was met by lead vocalist Vince Neil and taken to the group's hotel where he found "this young woman, spread eagle on the bed, naked, and they're going at her with a wine bottle". Though he had to sanitize the story heavily before it could be published, the issue nonetheless created a firestorm of controversy which saw retailers such as 7-Eleven threaten to take the magazine off its shelves. Over the ensuing decade, Hit Parader became one of America's leading heavy metal publications, providing extensive coverage of the era's popular acts such as Mötley Crüe, Quiet Riot, Def Leppard, Ratt, and Ozzy Osbourne. During this period the magazine also published special bonus issues with titles such as Hit Parader's Heavy Metal Hot Shots and Hit Parader's Heavy Metal Heroes. Secher often went on the road to meet the artists personally. "Ozzy in Brazil, Dio in Japan, Bon Jovi in Canada, the Scorpions in Sweden...it goes on and on. There's no question that the times were bigger and brighter in the '70s and '80s," he has said of this era.

Secher produced a spinoff television program entitled Hit Parader's Heavy Metal Heroes on USA Network which featured heavy metal music videos and short interviews with the artists who regularly appeared in the magazine. During its 1980s heyday, Hit Parader featured the work of rock journalists such as Charley Crespo, Jodi Summers, Wolfgang Schnapp, Adrianne Stone, Rob Andrews, Winston Cummings, and Rick Evans.

=== Post-1980s decline ===
Hit Parader fell into decline in the 1990s, with a handful of factors contributing to this. Facing financial troubles in 1991, Charlton sold off Hit Parader to raise money. Later that year, Guns N' Roses' hugely successful Use Your Illusion II album included a track entitled "Get in the Ring", the lyrics of which accused Secher and Hit Parader of "printin' lies instead of the things we said" and "rippin' off the fuckin' kids … [and] startin' controversy". The song was written in response to a March 1991 Hit Parader cover piece written by Secher in which the band's vocalist Axl Rose and Sebastian Bach of Skid Row were ostensibly interviewed together for the first time. However, it soon came to light that rather than the exclusive it claimed to be, the interview was instead merely a transcript of a telephone conversation between the two musicians and Howard Stern that had earlier been broadcast on Stern's popular radio-show. The pair, along with Rose's then-wife Erin Everly, had talked to Stern during a party at Rose's home, and some observers questioned whether it even constituted a true interview. Rose and Bach both claimed that Hit Parader editor Andy Secher was misleading his readers with such tactics.

With the dramatic decline in the popularity of heavy metal in the 1990s, Hit Parader's monthly readership began a steady decline. Many observers have noted that everything changed almost overnight with the emergence of Nirvana and grunge music in 1991, and Secher agrees wholeheartedly with this conclusion. Of the magazine's 1970s and 1980s heyday, Secher has said "The stories are too many, and in some cases too wild, to be printed here."

Speaking to the music website rockcritics.com in the early 2000s, Secher identified the magazine's target readership as "a young, male demographic … They want short, pithy interviews and features – along with BIG color photos. The formula is fairly basic." He also defended Hit Parader's championing of heavy metal, despite the disapproval the genre attracted from some music critics, saying: "I always sensed that people like Christgau had to justify their existence by promoting the artistic aesthetics of the rock form. I've never taken any of this that seriously. Hit Parader isn't the New York Times … it's a frikkin' fanzine, and proud to be exactly that."

The magazine closed down following the publication of its December 2008 issue. During its years of operation, Hit Parader also published issues dedicated to "Top 100" lists, such as "Top 100 Metal Bands", "Top 100 Guitarists", "Top 100 Vocalists" and "Top 100 Bassists & Drummers".

=== Rebirth as a production studio ===
In 2020, entertainment industry veterans Matt Pinfield, Ash Avildsen, and Josh Bernstein purchased the rights to Hit Parader and resurrected it as a branded production company. The new Hit Parader was headquartered in the Panasonic building in Universal City with a mission statement to focus "on original content and immersive experiences." It announced plans for a new television series entitled Paradise City, which Avildsen described as "a mix of the young angst of Euphoria, the entertainment biz authenticity of Entourage and the supernatural fun of Sabrina", featuring Drea de Matteo and Bella Thorne. An eight-episode season airing on Amazon Prime was released in 2021. The use of the Hit Parader brand remained rather inactive other than its use sponsoring festivals such as 2024's relaunch of the Mayhem Festival.

=== Relaunch of print magazine ===
In September 2025, Hit Parader was relaunched as an online and print magazine, with Yungblud as its initial cover star. Alongside the relaunch, Avildsen opened the Hit Parader Club in Nashville, which hosts live performances of the magazine's cover artists. A Hit Parader video-on-demand service is also in development.
