= Concrete Jungle (The OST) =

Concrete Jungle [The OST]

Compilation album by Bad Omens
- Released: May 31, 2024
- Genre: Metalcore; industrial metal; electropop; electro-industrial
- Length: 94:19
- Label: Sumerian
- Producer: Noah Sebastian; Joakim Karlsson

Bad Omens chronology
The Death of Peace of Mind (2022)	Concrete Jungle [The OST] (2024)

Singles from Concrete Jungle
- 1. "V.A.N." Released: January 24, 2024; 2. "The Drain" Released: April 17, 2024; 3. "The Death of Peace of Mind (So Wylie Patch)" Released: April 17, 2024; 4. "Anything > Human" Released: May 30, 2024

Concrete Jungle [The OST] is the first compilation album by American heavy metal band Bad Omens, released on May 31, 2024 through Sumerian Records. The album is considered a follow–up to the record, The Death of Peace of Mind. It also serves as the companion soundtrack to the graphic novel "Bad Omens – Concrete Jungle, Volume 1".

== Release ==
Following the success of the band's previous album, metalcore band Bad Omens was consistently booked on tours, shows, and festivals following the end of COVID–19 shutdowns. The sleeper success of "Just Pretend" after going viral on TikTok only further cemented the band's success, eventually becoming the band's first number-one radio hit.

June 2023 saw the announcement of the "Concrete Jungle" comic book series, chronicling the fictional Bad Omens crime syndicate, by Sumerian Records. Operating within a sprawling metropolis by the same name of the comic book, the group seeks to consolidate their power within the city while obeying their own moral code. The first of four issues released on September 6.

"V.A.N", the first single to be released from the album, was released on January 24, 2024, featuring Poppy, with whom they were currently touring. Rumors of a fourth Bad Omens album, often named Concrete Forever on the basis of the tour name, began to circulate.

The album was officially announced on April 17, alongside a release date set for May 31. The announcement coincided with the release of two new singles: "The Drain" featuring Health and Swarm, and a remix of "The Death of Peace of Mind" by So Wylie. A fourth single, "Anything > Human" featuring Erra, was distributed the day before the album's release.

== Critical reception ==
Professional ratings
Review scores
Source	Rating
Kerrang!	4/5
Hive Magazine	4/5
Ghost Cult Magazine	8/10
Metal Hammer	4/5

The album received generally positive reviews, with critics praising the breadth of styles explored within the record, with some complaining that some songs strayed too far from the band's core sound. Isabella Ambrosio of Kerrang! wrote that "Often straddling the pitch-black line of dark electropop and metalcore, each collaboration has its own identity without ever overlapping". Of the first disc of the album, Jasmin Choy of Hive Magazine observed "It's an interesting move having the majority of the first section of a new album not featuring/primarily not having vocals from the lead vocalist, but I think this helps focus the listener on Bad Omens as one unit rather than Noah Sebastian and then the band. This [...] could be because of the parasocial relationships created over the last year from a huge number of Bad Omens fans". This refers to Noah Sebastian having deleted all of his social media accounts in late 2023 in response to heightened attention and unwanted outreach from Bad Omens fans. Metal Hammer rated the album four stars and described it as "a synthetic neon-noir spectacle".

== Track listing ==
All tracks are written and produced by Noah Sebastian and Joakim Karlsson, except where noted. All tracks are stylized in upper case.

Disc 1 (Original songs)
No.	Title	Writer(s)	Producer	Length
1.	"C:\Projects\CJOST\BEATDEATH"			0:58
2.	"V.A.N" (featuring Poppy)			4:34
3.	"The Drain" (featuring Health and Swarm)	Sebastian; Karlsson; Michael Taylor; Ajay Battacharyya; Health; Swarm; Stint	Sebastian; Health; Stint; Swarm	3:46
4.	"Terms & Conditions" (featuring Bob Vylan)	Sebastian; Karlsson; Jesse Cash; Bob Vylan		2:08
5.	"Hedonist (Recharged)" (featuring Wargasm)	Sebastian; Karlsson; Sam Matlock; Milkie Way	Sebastian; Karlsson; Matlock	3:24
6.	"Even"	Sebastian; Taylor	Sebastian; Taylor	2:58
7.	"Loading Screen"	Nicholas Ruffilo	Nicholas Ruffilo	1:53
8.	"Anything > Human" (featuring Erra)	Sebastian; Karlsson; Cash; Taylor; Daniel Braunstein	Sebastian; Braunstein	3:55
9.	"Digital Footprint"			4:46
10.	"Nervous System" (featuring iRiS.EXE)	Sebastian; Taylor; iRiS.EXE	Sebastian; Taylor; iRiS.EXE	3:21

Disc 2 (Remixes from The Death of Peace of Mind)
No.	Title	Writer(s)	Producer	Length
11.	"C:\Projects\CJOST\FINDPEACE"			0:58
12.	"Artificial Suicide (Unzipped)" (featuring Thousand Below)	Sebastian; Karlsson; Cash	Sebastian; Karlsson; Josh Billimoria	1:53
13.	"The Grey (Unzipped)" (featuring Thousand Below)		Sebastian; Karlsson; Billimoria	3:09
14.	"The Death of Peace of Mind (We Are Fury Patch)" (featuring We Are Fury)		Sebastian; Karlsson; We Are Fury	2:34
15.	"The Death of Peace of Mind (So Wylie Patch)" (featuring So Wylie)	Sebastian; Karlsson; So Wylie	Sebastian; Karlsson; So Wylie	2:45
16.	"Bad Decisions (Lofi)" (featuring Dahlia)		Sebastian; Dahlia	4:05
17.	"Just Pretend (Credits)" (featuring Let's Eat Grandma and Chief)	Sebastian; Jackson	Sebastian; Taylor; Jenny Hollingworth	3:59

Disc 3 (Live recordings from The Death of Peace of Mind tours)
No.	Title	Writer(s)	Producer	Length
18.	"C:\Projects\CJOST\CLEARMIND"	Sebastian; Karlsson; Cash		0:58
19.	"Artificial Suicide (Live 2024)"			4:16
20.	"Like a Villain (Live 2024)"			4:10
21.	"The Grey (Live 2024)"			4:30
22.	"What do you want from me? (Live 2024)"		Sebastian; Karlsson; Cash	3:45
23.	"Nowhere To Go (Live 2024)"			4:54
24.	"V.A.N (Live 2024)" (featuring Poppy)	Sebastian; Karlsson; Taylor	Sebastian	3:39
25.	"The Death of Peace of Mind (Live 2024)"			4:55
26.	"Just Pretend (Live 2024)" (with hidden track "Just Pretend" in acoustic)			9:48
Total length:				94:19

== Personnel ==
Credits adapted from the album's Tidal page.

Bad Omens

- Noah Sebastian – vocals, programming, production
- Joakim Karlsson – guitar, programming, production
- Nicholas Ruffilo – bass
- Nick Folio – drums

Personnel

- Zakk Cervini – mastering engineer
- Matt Dierkes – mixing engineer
- Julian Gargiulo – additional engineering and mixing
- Alex Prieto – editing on tracks 5, 8, 10
- Chaz Sexton – assistant recording engineer on tracks 5, 8, 10

== Charts ==
Chart performance for Concrete Jungle (The OST)
Chart (2025–2026)	Peak position
French Rock & Metal Albums (SNEP)	23
