= Never Know =

2021 single by Bad Omens

Single by Bad Omens

from the album Finding God Before God Finds Me
- Released: June 16, 2021
- Recorded: 2019
- Length: 3:34
- Label: Sumerian

Bad Omens singles chronology
"Limits" (2020)	"Never Know" (2021)	"The Death of Peace of Mind" (2021)

"Never Know" is a song by American heavy metal band Bad Omens. It was released as a single from the deluxe edition of their second studio album, Finding God Before God Finds Me. It peaked at number 25 on the Billboard Mainstream Rock Songs chart in August 2021.

== Background ==
In August 2019, Bad Omens released their second studio album, Finding God Before God Finds Me. In December 2019, the band announced they would be releasing a deluxe edition of the album in January 2020 with three additional tracks; the track "Never Know" would be one of those three tracks. The original version of the song was released in December 2019 at the time of the announcement. When the COVID-19 pandemic halted plans for the band to tour in support of the album, the band decided to spend the time creating alternate versions of their songs, including "Never Know". In October 2020, the band released an acoustic recording of the song, along with an accompanying performance video. This version would be included on the acoustic album FGBGFM Unplugged. Later in June 2021, a live version of the song was released as well, again with a music video. In 2021, it was released to US rock radio as a single, and in August 2021, it peaked at number 25 on the Billboard Mainstream Rock Songs chart; the second highest of their career until then, behind the previous single "Limits".

== Themes and composition ==
Frontman Noah Sebastian noted that the song was part of the band's efforts to "show that you can make empowering, happy, positive music without it being cheesy or corny" and that it was written in an effort to "convey [his] experiences and feelings in a way that people could sing along and just feel in control and powerful".

== Personnel ==
Bad Omens

- Noah Sebastian – vocals
- Joakim Karlsson – guitar
- Nicholas Ruffilo – bass, guitar
- Nick Folio – drums

== Charts ==
Chart performance for "Never Know"
Chart (2021)	Peak position
US Mainstream Rock (Billboard)	25
