= The Johnstones =

Canadian ska punk band

- Origin: Ajax, Ontario, Canada
- Genres: Ska punk, pop punk, hip hop, reggae
- Years active: 2002–2012
- Label: Stomp
- Past members: Rene Gillezeau; Jarek Hardy; Ryan Long; Brent Marks; Julian Warmé; Mike Murphy; Kevin Johnstone

The Johnstones were a ska punk band from Ajax, Ontario, Canada, formed in 2002. In 2006, they signed to Stomp Records of Montreal, released the full-length album Word is Bond and began touring Canada and the U.S.

In 2008, they released Sex, an EP produced by Flashlight Brown members Matt Hughes and Fil Bucchino.

Mike Murphy was added to the band's lineup in 2009, allowing Long to be the front-man of the band. 2009 also saw the release of a full-length CD called Can't Be Trusted. They released a DVD called Get On Board and the Gimme Your Love (Or Gimme Some Money) EP in 2010.

== Band members ==
=== Final lineup ===
- Rene Gillezeau - guitars, trumpet, MC
- Jarek Hardy - vocals, guitars
- Ryan Long - lead vocals
- Brent Marks - bassist
- Julian Warmé - keyboard, trombone
- Mike Murphy - drums

=== Former ===
- Kevin Johnstone

== Discography ==
- What the Rosstek?! (album, 2004)
- Word is Bond (album, 2006)
- Sex (EP, 2008)
- Can't Be Trusted (album, 2009)
- Suck (album, 2012)
