= Ryan Long (comedian) =

Canadian comedian, filmmaker, and podcaster

- Born: August 12, 1985 (age 41); Toronto, Canada
- Occupations: Comedian, podcaster, filmmaker
- Website: ryanlongcomedy.com

Ryan Long (born August 12, 1985) is a Canadian comedian, filmmaker, and podcaster based in New York City. He is known for his satirical takes on sensitive social and political issues. Long's comedy often explores themes like political correctness, performative activism, and social justice. His performances include observational humor and provocative commentary. Long gained recognition for his viral comedy sketches on YouTube, which have received millions of views. He releases a new comedy sketch every Monday. Long has voiced a titular character in Aaron Long's ongoing animated web-series Sublo & Tangy Mustard since 2015. The two are cousins.

Long is the host of the podcast The Boyscast with fellow Canadian comedian Danny Polishchuk, and has appeared on platforms like Netflix, NBC, and MTV, as well as on podcasts like Ari Shaffir's Skeptic Tank, and The Joe Rogan Experience. Prior to The Boyscast, Long was the creator, lead actor, and showrunner of several digital series, including Torontopia and That Guy (both on CBC Comedy), and Ryan Long is Challenged on BITE TV.

Before doing comedy, in the early 2000s Long was the lead singer and sometimes drummer of the ska-punk band The Johnstones. The band's last album was released in 2012. In 2017 Long became the Head of Video at the satirical punk culture website The Hard Times. Long moved to the United States in 2019 via the "Extraordinary Alien" Green Card program, and has since become a fixture in the New York City comedy scene, regularly performing at venues like The Comedy Cellar and The Stand Comedy Club. In 2024 Long toured Australia. His stand-up specials, including Problem Solved and Ryan Long: White Immigrant, are available to stream for free on YouTube.

Although Long has received praise from conservative media outlets and entertainment critics like The Federalist, Fox News, Rebel News, and Christian Toto, he claims to "eschew political labels for both himself and his work."
