= The Hard Times =

Satirical news website

- Logo of The Hard Times
- Company type: Subsidiary
- Website type: Satirical website
- Founded: 2014; 12 years ago
- Headquarters: Nashville, TN, {{{location_country}}}
- Area served: Worldwide
- Founders: Matt Saincome; Bill Conway; Ed Saincome
- Industry: Media; Entertainment
- Employees: 250-300 contributors (July 2017)
- Parent: Sumerian Publishing Group
- Subsidiaries: Hard Drive
- Website: thehardtimes.net

The Hard Times is a satirical website with a focus on punk (especially hardcore punk and first wave screamo), alt music, and millennial culture founded in 2014 by former SF Weekly music editor Matt Saincome, his brother Ed Saincome, and comedian Bill Conway. It has been compared to The Onion, ClickHole, and Reductress in style, and has received praise for its specificity and niche appeal.

The Hard Times also publishes Hard Drive, a satirical video game vertical, hosts stand-up comedy shows at music festivals, and produces podcasts. As of 2021, the Hard Times podcast network included:

- The Hard Times Podcast, hosted by co-founders Bill Conway and Matt Saincome
- The Hard Drive Podcast, hosted by Hard Drive co-creators Jeremy Kaplowitz and Mark Roebuck
- Hard Money’s Million Dollar Podcast
- The First Ever Podcast, hosted by Jeremy Bolm, vocalist of Touché Amoré
- Fanboys
- Up the Blunx
- Coward Hour, hosted by comedians Brendan Krick and Nik Oldershaw
- The Ace Watkins Presidential Hour
- The Pitch Group, hosted by Eric Navaro
- The Horror Times, hosted by Tiana Miller, Lauren Lavin and Dan Rice
- Hipsterocracy, hosted by comedian Johnny Taylor, Jr.
- Vert Button, hosted by Bill Conway, Andrew Cannon, and Tim Ward
- Deep Dive in the Shallow End, hosted by Kris Casey and Jeremy Kaplowitz

Content published by The Hard Times is typically virally spread through engagement on social media such as Facebook. The site averages between 2 and 6 million views a month.

== History ==
Founder Matt Saincome began pitching the idea for The Hard Times in 2012 as a junior studying journalism at San Francisco State. He formally founded The Hard Times with his brother Ed and comedian Bill Conway in December 2014, following a soft launch earlier in the year.

In September 2016, the site passed 3 million views, and entered into an advertising partnership with Vice Media.

In 2017, the site launched Hard Drive for video game related articles, and began developing video content. The site tapped Jeremy Kaplowitz, Mike Amory, and Mark Roebuck as co-founding editors. The site also brought on Canadian comedian Ryan Long as Head of Video.

In 2018, The Hard Times began work on a book and a television show.

In 2019, several editors of The Hard Times and actor Phil Jamesson created a parody presidential candidate Ace Watkins account on Twitter, with the fictional candidate claiming to aspire to be "the first gamer president". The Twitter account amassed more than 40,000 followers within several days after the account's creation.

Hard Times Media LLC sold The Hard Times to Project M Group, the parent company of Revolver magazine and Inked magazine, in July 2020, while maintaining ownership of Hard Drive.

In May 2023 The Hard Times parted ways with Project M and is once again owned and operated independently by the site's founders.

In December 2024, Matt Saincome announced that The Hard Times and Hard Drive had been acquired by Sumerian Entertainment, which also owns Sumerian Records and Sumerian Comics.

In 2025 it posted, and quickly retracted, articles on the September 10 killing of Charlie Kirk titled "Antivaxxer Finally Gets Shot" and "Incompetent Assassin Somehow Misses Largest Head On Planet". Following the retraction a few additional articles were posted, the last update occurring Sept 13, 2025, with no further activity until November of that year. No reason was given for the down period.

== See also ==
- List of satirical news websites
