= The Death of Peace of Mind (song) =

Single by Bad Omens

from the album The Death of Peace of Mind
- Released: November 9, 2021
- Length: 4:01
- Label: Sumerian
- Songwriters: Noah Sebastian; Joakim Karlsson
- Producers: Noah Sebastian; Joakim Karlsson

Bad Omens singles chronology
"Never Know" (2021)	"The Death of Peace of Mind" (2021)	"What Do You Want from Me?" / "Artificial Suicide" (2021)
"Just Pretend" (2022)	"The Death of Peace of Mind" (2023)	"V.A.N." (2024)

Music video
- "The Death of Peace of Mind" on YouTube

"The Death of Peace of Mind" (stylized in all caps) is a song by American heavy metal band Bad Omens. It was initially released as the lead single for their third album of the same name on November 9, 2021. After their song "Just Pretend" became a large viral and radio sleeper hit in late-2022 and early-2023, the band released the song to radio on May 16, 2023, where it also became a large hit. It was certified Gold by the Recording Industry Association of America on January 11, 2024, indicating 500,000 units in the United States (including sales and units adjusted for streaming numbers), becoming their second song to do so after "Just Pretend".

== Composition ==
Speaking to Kerrang!, Noah Sebastian stated that the song's writing process started at the beginning of the quarantine of the COVID-19 pandemic in 2020 as an experiment to use as many samples using household objects:

"This track didn't have much deliberation behind the lyrics at first and was more of a flow-state writing experience. The skeleton of this song was a really experimental process that took place over the course of a full day. If you haven't heard about the genesis of this song by now, I'll make it brief: at the start of quarantine in 2020 I challenged myself to make a track using only samples I recorded of household items. Smacking pillows, shaking keys, recording and tuning the low frequency of a vacuum cleaner to a C note and making a multi octave sampler out of it. Stuff like that. After a few hours of tinkering in my DAW [digital audio workstation] I had made an instrumental with all these sounds. From there, I just looped sections and free-styled melodies with whatever words or incoherent noises came to my head. After countless loops the noises shaped into vowels, which shaped into consonants, and then words that ultimately felt very native to the dark, dry and sensual core of the instrumental and didn't need much tweaking once the real instrumental was realised around them. Asking the question: 'When this is all over, will we both go home alive, and will we ever find inner peace again after the events that took place?'"

== Notable covers ==
In March 2025, former American Idol finalist, Chris Daughtry covered "The Death of Peace of Mind" on his YouTube channel. Daughtry claimed it was his favorite song from "the past five years".

== Charts ==
=== Weekly charts ===
Weekly chart performance for "The Death of Peace of Mind"
Chart (2021–24)	Peak position
US Hot Rock & Alternative Songs (Billboard)	30
US Rock & Alternative Airplay (Billboard)	7

=== Year-end charts ===
2023 year-end chart performance for "The Death of Peace of Mind"
Chart (2023)	Position
US Hot Rock & Alternative Songs (Billboard)	77

2024 year-end chart performance for "The Death of Peace of Mind"
Chart (2024)	Position
US Hot Rock & Alternative Songs (Billboard)	99
US Rock & Alternative Airplay (Billboard)	43

== Certifications ==
Certifications for "The Death of Peace of Mind"
Region	Certification	Certified units/sales
United Kingdom (BPI)	Silver	200,000^{‡}
United States (RIAA)	Gold	500,000^{‡}
^{‡} Sales+streaming figures based on certification alone.
