= Bad Omens (album) =

Studio album by Bad Omens
- Released: August 19, 2016
- Genre: Metalcore; post-hardcore
- Length: 43:19
- Label: Sumerian
- Producer: Will Putney

Bad Omens chronology
Bad Omens (2016)	Finding God Before God Finds Me (2019)

Singles from Bad Omens
- 1. "Glass Houses" Released: December 18, 2015; 2. "Exit Wounds" Released: January 5, 2016; 3. "The Worst in Me" Released: May 11, 2016; 4. "The Fountain" Released: July 15, 2016

Bad Omens is the debut studio album by American heavy metal band Bad Omens, which was released on August 19, 2016, through Sumerian Records. It is the only album with bassist Vincent Riquier, who left the band in July 2018.

== Musical style ==
The album is described as metalcore, and post-hardcore, with nu metal, industrial metal and pop influences.

== Release ==
Four singles were released from the album, with "Glass Houses", "Exit Wounds" and "The Worst in Me" having music videos, which were released on December 18, 2015, January 4 and May 11, 2016, respectively.

== Track listing ==
All tracks are written by Bad Omens.

No.	Title	Length
1.	"Glass Houses"	4:00
2.	"Exit Wounds"	3:26
3.	"The Worst in Me"	3:49
4.	"F E R A L"	4:05
5.	"Enough, Enough Now"	4:05
6.	"Malice"	3:00
7.	"Hedonist"	2:07
8.	"Broken Youth"	3:14
9.	"Crawl"	4:07
10.	"The Letdown"	4:06
11.	"Reprise (The Sound of the End)"	3:21
12.	"The Fountain"	3:59
Total length:		43:19

== Personnel ==
Bad Omens

- Noah Sebastian – vocals
- Joakim Karlsson – lead guitar
- Vincent Riquier – bass
- Nicholas Ruffilo – rhythm guitar
- Nick Folio – drums

Production

- Will Putney – engineering, mixing, mastering
- Randy LeBouef – engineering
- Steve Seid – technical support

== Charts ==
Chart performance for Bad Omens
Chart (2016)	Peak position
US Top Hard Rock Albums (Billboard)	13
US Heatseekers Albums (Billboard)	9
US Independent Albums (Billboard)	30
US Top Rock Albums (Billboard)	43
