= Matt Saincome =

American journalist (born 1991)

- Born: 1991 (age 34–35); Danville, California, U.S.
- Education: San Francisco State University
- Occupations: Businessperson, Journalist, and Satirist
- Notable work: The Hard Times: The First 40 Years

Matt Saincome (born 1991) is an American businessperson, journalist, and satirist.

== Education ==
Matt Saincome was born in Danville, California, in 1991. Following high school he graduated from San Francisco State University with a degree in journalism.

== Music ==
In 2009 he and his brother Ed cofounded the straight edge hardcore band Zero Progress, for which Saincome was the frontman using the stage name of “The Champ” – a satirical character based on typical hardcore frontmen’s macho attitudes. The band folded in 2014, following which Saincome founded the straight edge band PURE. He has also served as a booker for hardcore and punk shows in the San Francisco area.

== Writing ==
Saincome published a zine called Punks! Punks! Punks! between 2009 and 2012, releasing a total of six issues. Ian Mackaye, Henry Rollins, Lars Frederiksen, and several other punk scene figures were interviewed in the zine, which had a print run of about 50 copies an issue. Following his degree in journalism, he worked as a freelancer for Vice and served as the music editor at SF Weekly until 2016. As a freelancer he produced several articles that went viral, including his Weekly piece “Meet the Man Who Had Sex with a Dolphin (and Wrote a Book About It)”. During this time he came up with the idea of creating a career out of what he called “punk comedy journalism”.

== The Hard Times ==
In November 2014 Saincome, his brother Ed Saincome, and Bill Conway used an $800 budget to cofound the satirical website The Hard Times. The original typewriter that Saincome used to propose his first idea for the Hard Times is now in the hands of a private collector. Since its founding, the site has added live events and a podcast network to its repertoire. The podcast is entitled The Hard Times Podcast, and features Saincome and Conway in discussion and doing interviews. Its work has been described as a "combination of satirical stories that get into the nitty-gritty of punk politics, and spoofs of news stories". By 2019 the site was receiving about five million views per month. In 2019 the company cofounded a sister site about videogaming called The Hard Drive.

He also cofounded OutVoice in 2018, an automated tool for freelancer payments. Their clients include Hearst Communications, Adweek, and the Onion. In 2019, Saincome co-authored the book, The Hard Times: The First 40 Years, following which he proceeded with a national book tour. In 2020 The Hard Times was acquired by Project M in a deal that valued the company over $2 million and allowed Saincome to retain ownership of Hard Drive. He also stayed on board at Hard Times in a position focusing on brand vision. Saincome was a featured speaker at ONA23.

== Hard Money Podcast ==
In May 2021, Saincome, along with cohosts Enrique Abeyta, Danny Polishchuk, and Gabe (nlm), created the Hard Money Million Dollar Podcast, in which Saincome cataloged his attempt to turn $10,000 in to $1,000,000 or go broke doing so. By December, 2021, they had reached a high of $160,694, over 16X their initial investment. Their strategies included discussions about investments in Cryptokitty renaming, NFTs like TopShot, vending machine distribution platforms, options trades, and other highly speculative investments. During this time, Saincome was honored with the creation of an anonymous parody account, CattSaincome, which continues to troll Saincome. Ultimately, the podcast ended with $73,748 in February 2023, nearly 7X in its two years of existence.

== Unusual Whales ==
In 2025, Saincome became a venture partner at Dyanism Capital. Saincome is currently the CEO of Unusual Whales, an API platform that uses AI to track options trades.According to Saincome, as quoted on the Motley Fool website, the purpose is "so retail investors can invest alongside Congress and reduce information asymmetries." Subscribers to the platform can track trading by politicians, as well as conversations about trades in Discord and Telegram, prediction markets, and a custom-built AI model that tracks over 1 billion data points a day. For his work on Unusual Whales, Saincome has been featured on NPR and in Memelord Magazine. Unusual Whales Newsletter is among the 40 most popular finance newsletters on Substack and maintains a communities on Discord and YouTube. Data collected by Unusual Whales led to the creation of ETFs following both Democrats and Republicans. The tool has also revealed that some Congresspeople have recorded gains of over 100% while in office.

== Personal life ==
Matt Saincome adheres to a straight edge lifestyle. On September 7, 2025, Saincome married Celina Kimelman, a designer, patternmaker, and owner of Belle De Nuit. Saincome and Kimelman have one child.
