= Finding God Before God Finds Me =

Studio album by Bad Omens
- Released: August 2, 2019
- Genre: Alternative metal; metalcore
- Length: 42:09
- Label: Sumerian
- Producer: Joakim Karlsson; Noah Sebastian

Bad Omens chronology
Bad Omens (2016)	Finding God Before God Finds Me (2019)	The Death of Peace of Mind (2022)

Singles from Finding God Before God Finds Me
- 1. "Careful What You Wish For" Released: September 19, 2018; 2. "Burning Out" Released: June 18, 2019; 3. "Said & Done" Released: July 9, 2019; 4. "Never Know" Released: December 17, 2019; 5. "Limits" Released: January 17, 2020

Finding God Before God Finds Me is the second studio album by American heavy metal band Bad Omens, released on August 2, 2019 through Sumerian Records. The album was self-produced. It was the group's first release as a quartet following the departure of bassist Vincent Riquier in July 2018.

== Release ==
On September 19, 2018, the band released the first single off the album, "Careful What You Wish For", followed by the album's announcement on June 17, 2019. The second single "Burning Out" was released the following day, followed by "Said & Done" on July 9 and the album itself on August 2.

On January 17, 2020, the album was re-released in a deluxe edition with the addition of the singles "Never Know" and "Limits" (the first of which was released as a single on December 17, 2019) and a cover of "Come Undone" by Duran Duran.

== Track listing ==
All tracks are written by Bad Omens (Noah Sebastian, Joakim Karlsson, Nicholas Ruffilo & Nick Folio) except where noted.

No.	Title	Length
1.	"Kingdom of Cards"	4:21
2.	"Running in Circles"	3:58
3.	"Careful What You Wish For"	4:32
4.	"The Hell I Overcame"	3:34
5.	"Dethrone"	3:29
6.	"Blood"	3:50
7.	"Mercy"	5:17
8.	"Said & Done"	3:24
9.	"Burning Out"	4:25
10.	"If I'm There"	5:21
Total length:		42:09

Deluxe edition
No.	Title	Writer(s)	Length
11.	"Never Know"		3:33
12.	"Limits"	Sebastian; Erik Ron	3:27
13.	"Come Undone" (Duran Duran cover)	Duran Duran	4:21
Total length:			53:36

== Personnel ==
Bad Omens

- Noah Sebastian – vocals, production
- Joakim Karlsson – guitar, production
- Nicholas Ruffilo – bass
- Nick Folio – drums

== Charts ==
Chart performance for Finding God Before God Finds Me
Chart (2019)	Peak position
US Top Hard Rock Albums (Billboard)	7
US Heatseekers Albums (Billboard)	4
US Independent Albums (Billboard)	12
US Top Rock Albums (Billboard)	21
