= Thousand Below =

American post-hardcore band

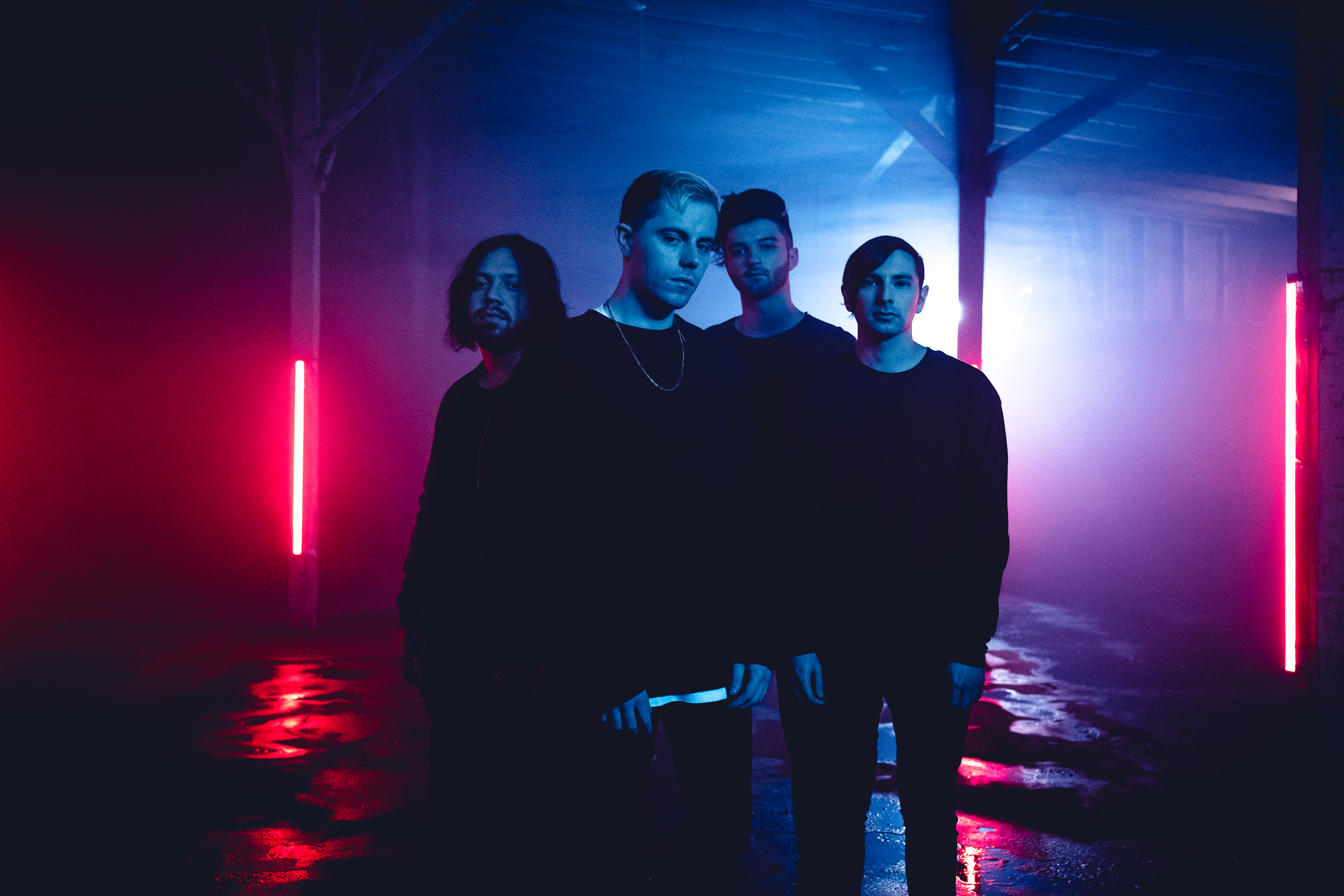
- Thousand Below, 2019.

Background information
- Origin: San Diego, California
- Genre: Post-hardcore
- Years active: 2016–present
- Labels: Rise; Pale Chord
- Members: James Deberg; Josh Thomas; Josh Billimoria; Max Santoro
- Past members: Devin Chance; Garrett Halvax
- Website: www.thousandbelow.com

Thousand Below is an American post-hardcore band from San Diego, California. They began under Rise Records and are currently under Pale Chord. The band has released four full-length albums and one EP. The current lineup is vocalist James Deberg, guitarist Josh Thomas, bassist Josh Billimoria, and drummer Max Santoro.

== History ==
=== 2016–2018: Formation – The Love You Let Too Close ===
Thousand Below was quietly formed in 2016 by vocalist James Deberg, who continued to write music after parting ways with his previous band, Outlands. Josh Thomas, guitarist and friend of Deberg, showed him some songs he was working on at the time, and the two decided to collaborate on projects.

After recruiting other friends and musicians in the area—Josh Billimoria on bass, Devin Chance on guitar, and Garrett Halvax on drums—the band's initial lineup fell into place. Still unnamed, they began recording in the studio for what would become their debut album, The Love You Let Too Close (2017). With a handful of songs recorded, they approached labels, ultimately catching the eye of Rise Records, with whom they signed.

With a record label and a name chosen, Thousand Below publicly debuted in January 2017 with their first single and music video for "Tradition," a track off of The Love You Let Too Close. The next single, "Sinking Me," was released with a music video on June 12, 2017. The album was released worldwide on October 6, 2017, charting on the Billboard Independent Albums Chart.

The band began touring consistently in North America and Europe from 2017 through 2018 with bands such as The Devil Wears Prada, Dance Gavin Dance, Veil of Maya, Blessthefall, and Being as an Ocean.

In February 2018, Thousand Below released an alternate, reimagined version of "Tradition" with a music video directed by their own Josh Thomas. 2018 also saw the music video for "Vein" off their debut album in August.

Chance and Halvax decided to part ways with the band in December 2018.

=== 2019: Lineup changes – Gone in Your Wake ===
In January 2019, Deberg, Thomas, and Billimoria hit the studio to begin recording their sophomore album, Gone In Your Wake. Without a drummer at the time, they contacted their friend Max Santoro, former drummer of Vesta Collide, to work on the drums for the album and fill in on upcoming tours. The band played Swanfest in March and then embarked on The Artificial Selection Tour with Dance Gavin Dance, Don Broco, Hail the Sun, and Covet. In the summer of 2019, the band went on tour with Miss May I, The Word Alive, and Afterlife. It was around this time that Santoro joined as Thousand Below's full-time drummer.

The first single off of Gone in Your Wake, titled "Chemical," was released on July 11, 2019, along with a music video. "Chemical" premiered on SiriusXM Octane, where it remained in rotation for several weeks. In the fall of 2019, Thousand Below toured the United States and Canada with Of Mice & Men, For The Fallen Dreams, and Bloodbather. Gone In Your Wake was officially released worldwide on October 11, 2019 and peaked at #32 on Billboard Independent Albums Chart. Artists featured on Gone In Your Wake include Marcus Bridge from Northlane and Michael McGough (formerly of Being As An Ocean).

=== 2020: Touring – Let Go of Your Love ===
With two studio albums under their belt, Thousand Below set out on tour in February 2020 across North America with Bad Omens, Oh, Sleeper, and Bloodline; by March 13, only a brief time into the schedule, the tour was postponed indefinitely due to the COVID-19 pandemic. All other tours and festivals the band had planned for the year were postponed or canceled, including a European tour with The Plot in You and the annual Impericon Festival with As I Lay Dying.

During the mandated quarantine, the band recorded an acoustic EP, Let Go of Your Love. The EP consists of four reworked songs from Gone in Your Wake, as well as an original song that shares the title of the EP. The reworked version of "chemical" features Sumner Peterson from Dead Lakes. Let Go of Your Love was released worldwide on August 21, 2020.

=== 2021–2023: New label – Hell Finds You Everywhere ===
In February 2021, Thousand Below released a single and music video for "Gone to Me." "Gone to Me" is not associated with any album, though it follows a similar sound as their second studio album, Gone In Your Wake (2019). Vocalist James Deberg shared that the single is about "the double-edged sword of trying to move forward" from deeply personal and painful connections.

They toured the UK in the fall of 2021 with Normandie and Caskets. In 2022, Thousand Below held their first US headline tour with support from Savage Hands and Sleep Waker; this tour featured a stop at So What Music Fest in May, shortly after the release of the single, "Venenosa." After their US tour wrapped up, Thousand Below joined Ocean Sleeper in Australia on the tour for Ocean Sleeper's latest EP.

The next single, "Face to Face," released in late September with the announcement that Thousand Below had signed with Pale Chord Music. In November, "Sabotage" joined the lineup of singles; it was then that the band announced their upcoming album would be titled Hell Finds You Everywhere. Hell Finds You Everywhere included the singles from 2022 and released on December 9, during the time that Thousand Below was touring with Bad Omens, Dayseeker, and Make Them Suffer on the Concrete Jungle tour. The title track from Hell Finds You Everywhere features the vocalist of Bad Omens, Noah Sebastian, and other tracks feature Matt Flood from Caskets and the Japanese rock band CVLTE.

In support of Hell Finds You Everywhere, Thousand Below spent much of 2023 on the road. They toured North America with Nothing More and Crown the Empire, and again with Senses Fail and Holding Absence, including festival appearances at Inkcarceration, Louder Than Life, Blue Ridge Rock Festival, and Aftershock. The band then embarked on an Australian tour in October with Thornhill, Holding Absence, and Bloom to conclude their touring circuit for the year.

=== 2024–2025: Buried In Jade ===
After the release and subsequent tours for Hell Finds You Everywhere, Thousand Below began to tease an upcoming album, which would be their fourth studio album. In the spring of 2024, the single “SHAKE” dropped with a music video steeped in cyberpunk atmosphere. Following this, they performed at So What Music Fest over the summer with another single releasing in July, “Wrong Again.”

In August, Thousand Below took to the road as support on Polaris’s North American 2024 tour, along with NERV and blessthefall. "SHAKE" and "Wrong Again" were included in their setlist. While 2024 was a quieter year for the band, 2025 opened strong, as Thousand Below joined Windwaker in Australia on the HYPERVIOLENCE tour. Australian bands Diamond Construct and HEADWRECK appeared on select dates.

The first official single for their fourth studio album released in May, the heavy hitter “Palace of Dread.” “Kerosene” and “Save Me (feat. Lø Spirit)” followed as singles in June and August, respectively. Buried In Jade released on August 8. The album included new remasters of the 2024 singles, “SHAKE” and “Wrong Again.”

With Buried In Jade out, Thousand Below launched their headliner tour in North America with support from Aviana, True North, and Dreamwake. Not long after, they traveled overseas to close out the year as support on ADEPT’s Blood Covenant EU/UK tour alongside Ocean Sleeper.

=== 2026–present ===
Thousand Below supported Poppy and LANDMVRKS on the road for the Constantly Nowhere tour in the summer of 2026, along with performances at Upheaval Festival and Inkcarceration. In September, Thousand Below launched their fall headline tour with support from Acres, VCTMS, and Lost In Separation; this tour included headlining a stage at Louder Than Life.

In November, they are booked to perform at the Orlando stop of Warped Tour.

Thousand Below has already booked a slot at Sonic Temple in 2027.

== Musical style and influences ==
Thousand Below has been described as a metalcore and post-hardcore band. According to AllMusic, the band utilizes "emotionally charged lyrics, melodic riffage, and combustible breakdowns with the dynamic atmospherics of post-rock."

== Band members ==
Current

- James Deberg – lead vocals (2016–present)
- Josh Thomas – rhythm guitar, programming, co-lead vocals (2016–present), lead guitar (2018–present)
- Josh Billimoria – bass, backing vocals (2016–present)
- Max Santoro – drums (2019–present)

Former

- Garrett Halvax – drums (2016–2018)
- Devin Chance – lead guitar (2016–2018)

Timeline

== Discography ==
=== Studio albums ===
Title	Album details
The Love You Let Too Close	Released: October 6, 2017; Label: Rise; Formats: LP, CD, digital download; Tracklisting: 1. Sinking Me; 2. Tradition; 3. Never Here; 4. Sleepless; 5. Carry the Weight; 6. The Love You Let Too Close; 7. Follow Me Home; 8. The Wolf and the Sea; 9. Vein; 10. No Place Like You; 11. Into the Gray
Gone in Your Wake	Released: October 11, 2019; Label: Rise; Formats: LP, CD, digital download; Tracklisting: 1. Chemical; 2. Disassociate; 3. Fake Smile; 4. Alone (Out of My Head); 5. The Edge of Your Bed (ft. Michael McGough of Being as an Ocean); 6. Vanish; 7. 171xo 8. Learn to Lose and It All Gets Easier; 9. Lost Between (ft. Marcus Bridge of Northlane); 10. The Other Side of Things; 11. Gone in Your Wake
Hell Finds You Everywhere	Released: December 9, 2022; Label: Pale Chord, Rise; Formats: LP, CD, digital download; Tracklisting: 1. Hell Finds You Everywhere (ft. Noah Sebastian of Bad Omens); 2. Venenosa; 3. Face to Face; 4. Sabotage; 5. Clockwork Enemy; 6. Next Time Around (ft. Matt Flood of Caskets); 7. Silent Season; 8. Shade; 9. Blue Roses Don't Fade (ft. CVLTE); 10. All That I Have Left to Give
Buried in Jade	Released: August 8, 2025; Label: Pale Chord, Rise; Formats: LP, digital download; Tracklisting: 1. Kerosene; 2. Palace of Dread; 3. Save Me (ft. Lø Spirit); 4. SHAKE; 5. The Quiet and Cold; 6. Los Angeles; 7. The Way Down; 8. Wrong Again; 9. Feel It End; 10. Royal Effect; 11. Michelle's Song; 12. Buried in Jade

=== EPs ===
Title	Album details
Let Go of Your Love	Released: August 21, 2020; Label: Rise; Formats: LP, CD, digital download; Tracklisting: 1. Let Go of Your Love; 2. Chemical (ft. Sumner Peterson of Dead Lakes); 3. Alone (Out of My Head); 4. 171xo 5. Lost Between

=== Singles ===
Title	Single details	Album details
Tradition	January 30, 2017	The Love You Let Too Close
Sinking Me	June 13, 2017	The Love You Let Too Close
Tradition (Reimagined)	February 14, 2018	non-album single
Chemical	July 12, 2019	Gone in Your Wake
Disassociate	August 30, 2019	Gone in Your Wake
Gone to Me	February 4, 2021	non-album single
Venenosa	May 4, 2022	Hell Finds You Everywhere
Face to Face	September 21, 2022	Hell Finds You Everywhere
Sabotage	November 9, 2022	Hell Finds You Everywhere
Gone2Me (Remix)	June 28, 2023	non-album single
SHAKE	March 22, 2024	Buried in Jade
Wrong Again	July 12, 2024	Buried in Jade
Palace of Dread	May 30, 2025	Buried in Jade
Kerosene	June 26, 2025	Buried in Jade
Save Me (feat. Lø Spirit)	August 7, 2025	Buried in Jade

=== Music videos ===
Title	Directed By	Video details
Tradition	unknown	January 30, 2017
Sinking Me	Michael Colasardo	June 12, 2017
Sleepless	Michael Colasardo	September 14, 2017
Tradition (Reimagined)	Josh Thomas	February 14, 2018
The Love You Let Too Close	Michael Colasardo	April 3, 2018
Vein	Michael Colasardo	August 29, 2018
Chemical	Orie McGinness	July 11, 2019
Disassociate	Orie McGinness	August 29, 2019
Alone (Out of My Head)	Orie McGinness	October 10, 2019
171xo	Burke Cullinane	July 7, 2020
Let Go of Your Love	Josh Thomas, James Deberg	July 30, 2020
Chemical (ft. Sumner Peterson of Dead Lakes)	DeadEyesArt	August 20, 2020
Gone to Me	Orie McGinness	February 4, 2021
Venenosa	Matthue Cole	May 4, 2022
Face to Face	Amber Parades	September 20, 2022
Sabotage	Alex Bemis	November 8, 2022
SHAKE	Alex Bemis	March 21, 2024
Palace of Dread	Aaron Marsh	May 29, 2025
Save Me (feat. Lø Spirit)	Orie McGinness	August 7, 2025
