= Sumerian Comics =

American comic book publisher

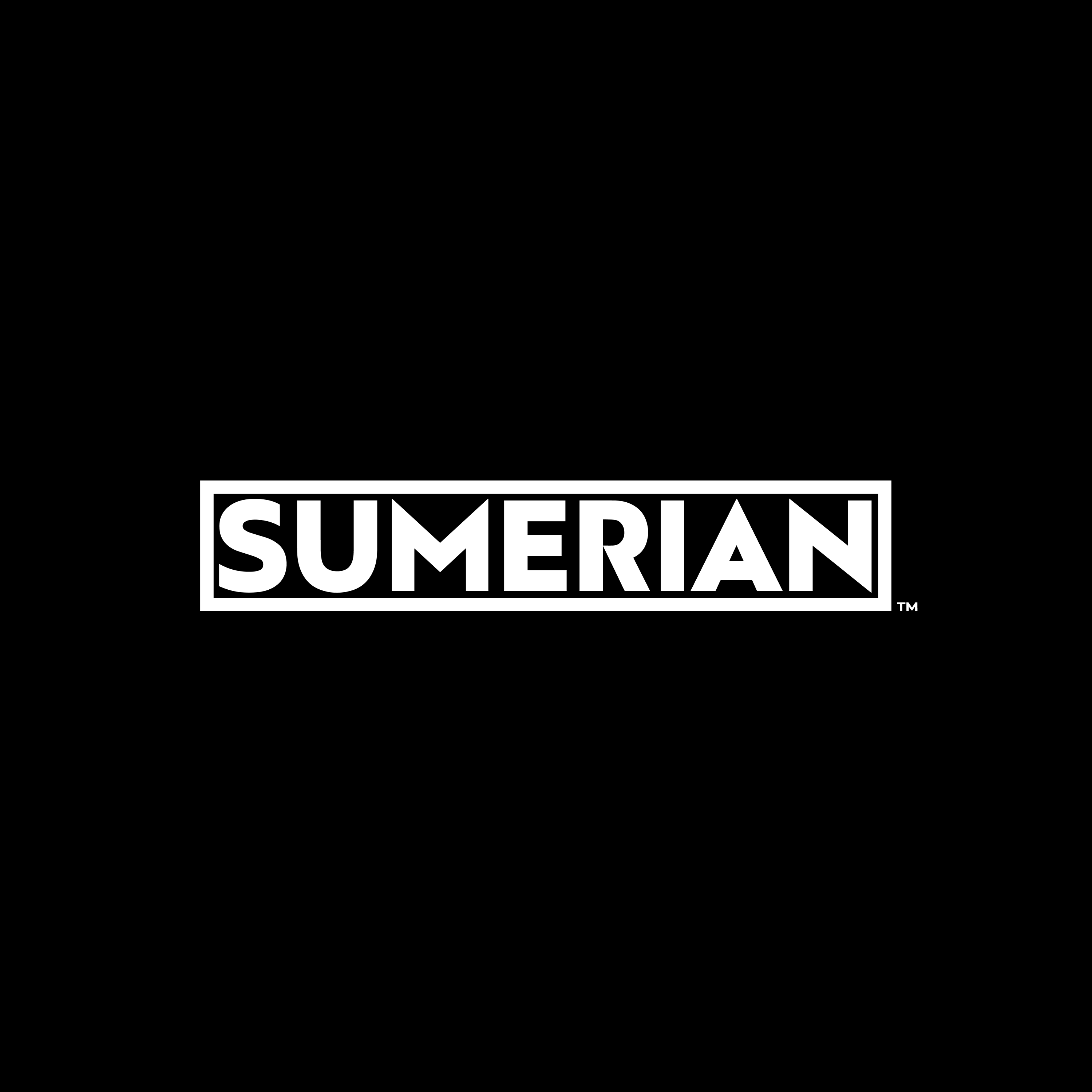
- Parent company: Sumerian Publishing Group
- Status: Active
- Predecessor: Behemoth Comics
- Founded: 2020; 6 years ago
- Founders: Nathan Yocum; Ryan Swanson
- Country of origin: United States
- Headquarters location: Nashville, Tennessee
- Distribution: Simon & Schuster (books); Diamond Comic Distributors, Inc. (comics)
- Key people: Nathan Yocum (President); Ryan Swanson (President); Ash Avildsen (Co-Founder)
- Publication types: Comics; graphic novels
- Official website: sumerian.ink

Sumerian Comics is an American comic book publisher based in Nashville, Tennessee. The company was founded in 2020 by Nathan Yocum and Ryan Swanson as Behemoth Comics. The comic division sells over half a million (500,000+) comics yearly, reached 8th in total market share in 2021, and is known for its array of licensed titles for films like American Psycho, The Crow, Basic Instinct; artists Bad Omens, Guns N' Roses, Sleep Token; and working with companies like Ubisoft, Netflix, and others. Their titles are currently distributed globally by Simon & Schuster & Diamond Comic Distributors. The company is owned by Sumerian Publishing Group and was renamed Sumerian Comics in July 2022.

== History ==
=== 2020–2022: Behemoth ===
Founded in 2020 after acquiring the Spain-based comic book publisher, Amigo Comics, Behemoth Comics debuted in the March Previews catalog for Diamond Comic Distributors. Owing to the COVID-19 pandemic and Diamond shutting down its distribution services for a brief period, Behemoth's first titles were not released until July 2020. On May 25, 2020 Bloody Disgusting announced that Behemoth would be releasing a spin-off of the popular video game series, Hotline Miami. The title, Hotline Miami: Wildlife is an 8-part series that was released monthly beginning in September 2020.

In November 2020, Bleeding Cool announced that A Girl Walks Home Alone at Night #1, written by film Director, Ana Lily Amirpour had sold through at least 10,000 copies of its first printing and would receive a second printing before the first issues releases. Shortly after Publishers Weekly and Graphic Policy revealed that Behemoth had signed a global distribution deal with Simon & Schuster and received managed publisher status with Amazon, Kindle, and ComiXology. The article also revealed that they acquired Film and TV representation for a portion of their books by the Hollywood-based Talent Agency, Grandview/Automatik founded by notable Film Producer, Brian Kavanaugh-Jones (Insidious, Sinister, Upgrade). The deal with Simon & Schuster would only cover trade paperbacks for the global market meanwhile Diamond Comic Distributors would still distribute their comic books and graphic novels to hobby stores around the globe.

On February 22, 2021, as part of the Comic Industry's Annual Publisher and Retailer conference, ComicsPro, Behemoth announced that it would publish the comic MFKZ, which was adapted and released as a film on Netflix. Shortly after the conference it was revealed that You Promised Me Darkness #1 had sold through 55,000 copies, marking the publisher's best selling first issue to date alongside MFKZ #1, which reached 40,000 copies sold. The company was revealed as a sponsor for the 2021 Fangoria Chainsaw Awards.

Leading off a wave of new licensed titles, Bloody Disgusting, GamesRadar+, and others revealed that Behemoth would be adapting the 2015 cult film, Turbo Kid into a prequel comic book series due to be released in September, 2021. This was followed by IGN revealing that Ubisoft and Behemoth had partnered for a comic book series based on Watch Dogs: Legion with the first issue being released November 3, 2021.

At the end of 2021, Behemoth revealed that they had surpassed half a million (500,000+) comics and graphic novels sold during the year; their first full year of operation.

At the end of 2021, Syfy and others revealed a comic by Behemoth called Kult Cable. Meant to be the lead in to a full series featuring more celebrities, the comic includes New Jersey hip-hop and punk group, Ho99o9 and the famous actor, Jack Black. The comic is a tie-in to the bands variety show of the same name that features well-known guests each episode.

On January 25, 2022, the entertainment website GamesRadar+ previewed a new licensed series from Behemoth based on the open-world RPG video game, Kingdom Come: Deliverance.

=== 2022-present: Sumerian ===
==== 2022 ====
Deadline Hollywood reported on March 23, 2022, that the entertainment company Sumerian Entertainment Group acquired Behemoth.

Deadline Hollywood reported the following week that Behemoth's original series, Paranormal Hitmen from creators Brett Murphy and Wilson Gandolpho is set to be adapted by Entertainment One and Hasbro into a TV series.

In July 2022, Behemoth was renamed as Sumerian Comics.

As part of the first titles announced under their new name, Billboard revealed that Ozuna would be partnering with Sumerian for an action-packed comic book. Ozuna said in a statement. “I’m very excited to partner with the talented team at Sumerian and make something fresh, captivating, and fun for my fans and my culture.”

==== 2023 ====
On March 21, 2023 various news sites announced that Sumerian has teamed up with the mathcore band The Dillinger Escape Plan for a graphic novel based on their 2013 record, One of Us Is the Killer. Guitarist Ben Weinman appeared at the annual WonderCon convention in Anaheim, CA to promote the release where he signed preview copies. The book released in February 2024 with hardback and various bundle options containing a special 10 year anniversary vinyl repressing of the record.

The Hollywood Reporter revealed that Cocaine Bear star and Critics' Choice Movie Awards winning actress Brooklynn Prince would be releasing her first comic book with Sumerian. The book is titled Misfortune's Eyes and follows Vivian Nightingale, a girl who wakes up on the morning of her 15th birthday and discovers that she can see human auras. The series released across February 2024 - April 2024 and Brooklynn signed copies at various stores and revealed her inspiration for the series came upon a visit with her dad to Cassadaga, Florida.

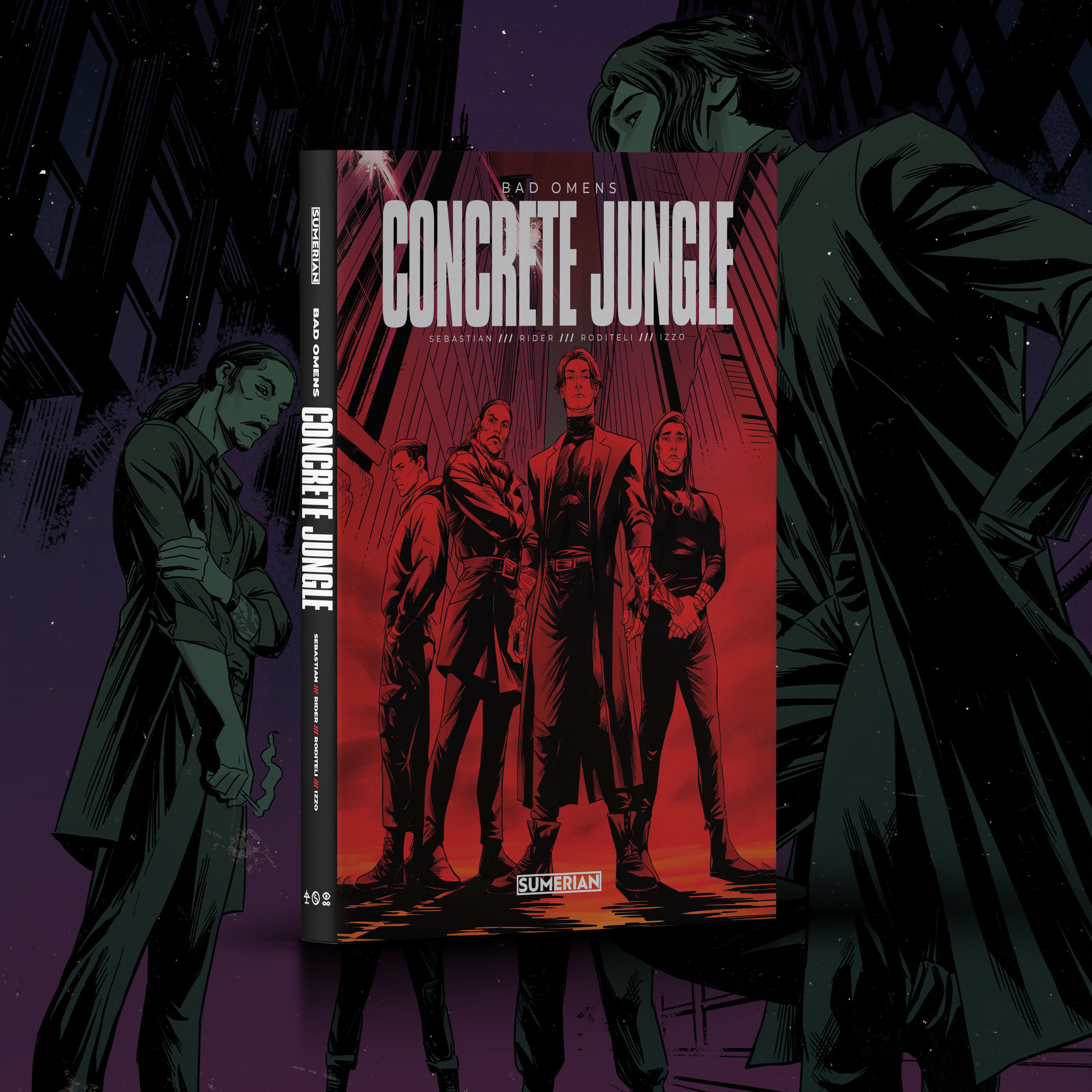
Bad Omens Hardback

On June 8, 2023 Revolver Magazine revealed that Sumerian produced the first comic book series for the band Bad Omens. Vocalist Noah Sebastian co-wrote the four issue series and it served as an expansion on the bands third record, The Death of Peace of Mind.

Entertainment Weekly and Deadline revealed that Sumerian gained the rights to the 2000 classic film, American Psycho and would release a four issue limited series with more planned, in October 2023. Christian Bale's likeness was provided as part of the deal and the comic featured a dual narrative.

In August, 2023 Deadline and CBR detailed Sumerian's newest licensed series, Basic Instinct based on the steamy ’90s Thriller With Sharon Stone & Michael Douglas. The series would debut in November 2023.

==== 2024 ====
The website Flickering Myth previewed a new Sumerian licensed title in March 2024 based on the 1980 John Carpenter film The Fog. The title is written as a sequel to the film and takes place forty years after the events that happened in Antonio Bay.

Revolver, Alt Press, and others revealed that, as part of the legendary metalcore act Underoath's upcoming 20th anniversary tour in support of their 2004 record They're Only Chasing Safety, that Sumerian would be releasing a comic book loosely based on the record and only available to VIP ticket buyers. Sumerian also noted that editions containing more than just the one issue will be released later on.

Kerrang! and many others premiered the music video for a new Puscifer song called "The Algorithm" in May 2024. The song stands as an original song written by the band for the American Psycho comic book series by Sumerian. It's part of a larger soundtrack that so far includes artists like Perturbator, Ramsey, Unlike Pluto, and others. The song originally premiered on Sirius XM Octane the day prior. As of the announcement of the Puscifer song, the other singles had amassed over 677,000 streams across platforms. Shortly after this reveal, further covers were announced with Ice Nine Kills, Reel Big Fish, and Carpenter Brut. The soundtrack is set to release alongside the graphic novel is October.

During San Diego Comic Con, Sumerian revealed that they had taken over the license to both reprint material for The Crow and publish new stories within the universe.

Sleep Token announced via a special site set up for news regarding the book that Sumerian produced a graphic novel for them titled Sleep Token: Teeth of God

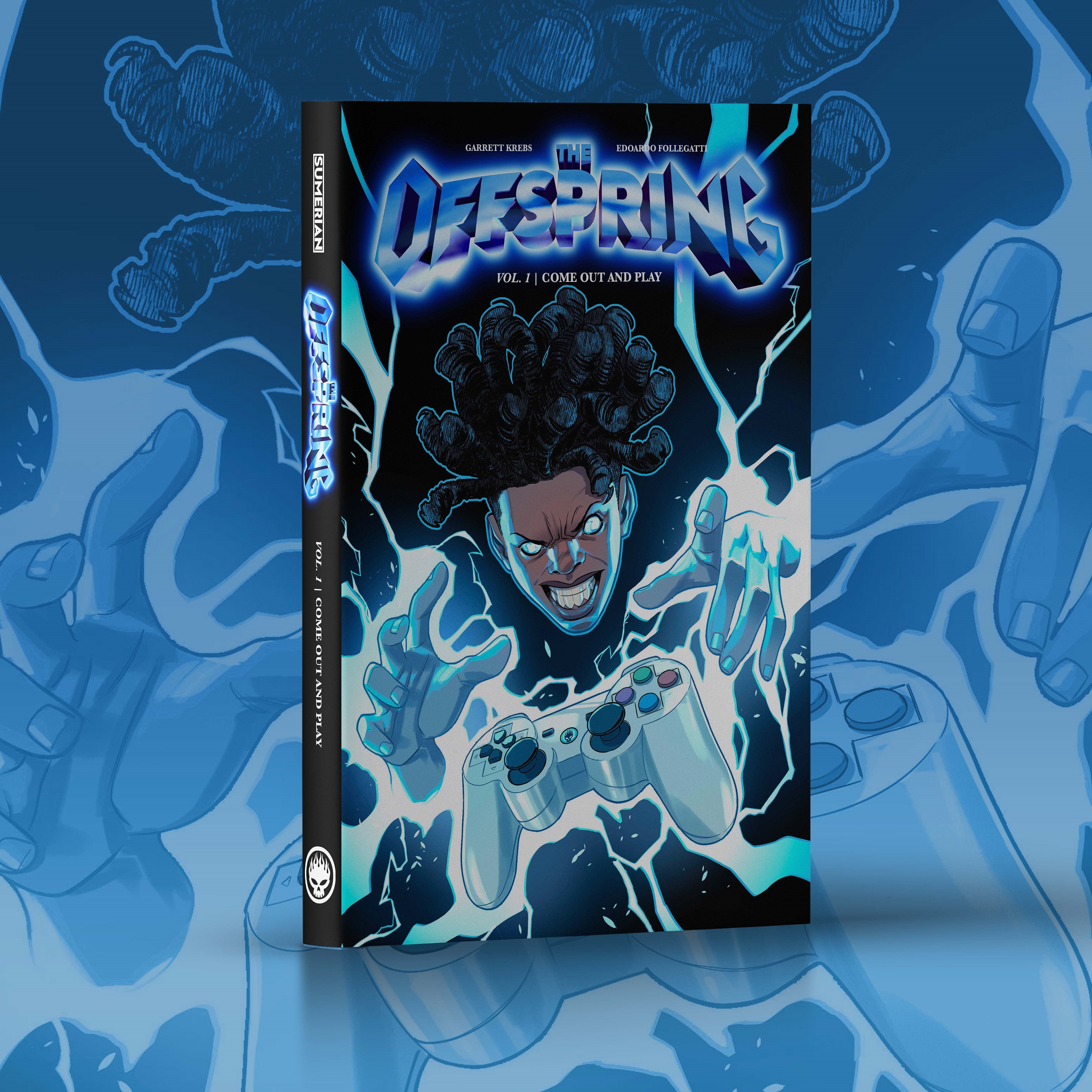
The Offspring Graphic Novel

Later in October, The Offspring announced alongside Sumerian that their first official graphic novel titled "Come Out and Play" would be available to pre-order the week following the release of their new record Supercharged.

==== 2025 ====
The first collaboration of 2025 was revealed to be with alternative rock band Anberlin. The book, titled Godspeed after one of the bands songs was co-written by bassist Deon Rexroat.

Shortly after the previous announcement, Sumerian and Interpol announced their team up on a graphic novel that ties into their 2004 record Antics. The graphic novel features Norman, the animatronic puppet from their music video for Evil and expands upon the story in the video.

During the 2025 MCM London Comic Con, Sumerian and The Used announced a graphic novel celebrating the bands 25th anniversary. The graphic novel, titled "All That I've Got" is inspired by the music video for the bands song of the same name.

On September 29th, 2025 various sites announced that Guns N' Roses had teamed up with Sumerian to create a graphic novel titled Axl Rose: Appetite For Destruction. The graphic novel was co-written by Axl and Sumerian co-founder Nathan Yocum. It's the first book in a trilogy of upcoming books set in the universe of Guns N' Roses.

==== 2026 ====
Sumerian released new licensed titles in 2026 with artists like Mayday Parade, Kittie, and Imminence being some of the more notable ones.

In July, Godsmack announced a graphic novel on their social media accounts with Sumerian. The graphic novel was inspired by their record Awake.

== Subsidiaries ==
=== Amigo Comics ===
Founded in Spain in 2012 by Juan "El" Torres, Amigo Comics is known for collecting Juan's series previously published by Image Comics such as Nancy in Hell and Drums. Amigo also published other creator-owned and licensed titles that Juan was not involved in a creative capacity. In 2019 Amigo was nominated for an Eisner Award in the Best Archival Collection/Project—Strips category for their title Sky Masters of the Space Force: The Complete Sunday Strips in Color. On February 24, 2020, it was announced that Amigo was acquired by Behemoth Comics and all future titles would be published in the US by Behemoth but would still carry the Amigo brand. This enabled Juan to focus solely on his titles.

== Sumerian Comics publications ==
=== Notable Licensed Film/TV Titles ===
- American Psycho #1-5 (October 11, 2023 - June 2024)
- The Crow: Dead Time #1-3 (October 2, 2024 - December 2024)
- Basic Instinct #1-4 (November 1, 2023 - April 2024)
- The Fog #1-4 (March 6, 2024 - June 2024)
- MFKZ #1-6 (June 23, 2021 - November 24, 2021) 40,000+ sold
- A Girl Walks Home Alone at Night #1-2 (November 18, 2020 - December 16, 2020)
- Turbo Kid #1-3 (September 29, 2021 - September 8, 2022)
- Kult Cable: ft. Ho99o9 & Jack Black (May 07, 2022)

=== Notable Licensed Video Game Titles ===
- Hotline Miami: Wildlife #1-8 (September 23, 2020 - April 7, 2021)
- Watch Dogs: Legion #1-4 (November 3, 2021 - February 2, 2022)
- Kingdom Come: Deliverance #1-4 (June 22, 2022 - September 2024)

=== Notable Licensed Artist Titles ===
- Bad Omens: Concrete Jungle #1-4 (September 6, 2023 - January 2024)
- The Dillinger Escape Plan: One of Us Is the Killer (February 18, 2024)
- Destroy Rebuild Until God Shows #1 (October 31, 2024)
- Underoath: They're Only Chasing Safety (November 26, 2024)
- Sleep Token: Teeth of God (November 29, 2024)
- The Offspring: Come Out and Play (January 22, 2024)
- Anberlin: Godspeed (April 1, 2025)
- Interpol: Antics (April 6, 2025)
- The Used: All That I’ve Got (September 10, 2025)
- Axl Rose: Appetite For Destruction (January, 2026)

=== Notable Original titles ===
- Found Footage GN (October, 2020)
- You Promised Me Darkness #1-5 (April 14, 2021 - August 15, 2021) 55,000+ sold
- Until My Knuckles Bleed #1-3 (January, 2022 - March, 2022)
- Paranormal Hitmen #1-4 (February, 2021 - May, 2021)
- Nancy in Hell Vol. 1: The Long Road (June, 2021)
- Osaka Mime Vol. 1 (May, 2021)
- Follow Me Into the Darkness #1-4 (February, 2022 - May, 2022)
- Heavy Metal Drummer #1-6 (February, 2022 - July, 2022)
- Dark Beach #1-6 (April, 2022 - September, 2022)
- Sara Lone #1-4 (October, 2022 - January, 2023)
- How I Became A Shoplifter #1-3 (January, 2023 - March, 2023)
- Children of the Comet #1-5 (July 2023 - December 2023)
- Misfortune's Eyes #1-3 (March, 2024 - May, 2024)
