= Just Pretend (Bad Omens song) =

Single by Bad Omens

from the album The Death of Peace of Mind
- Released: August 23, 2022
- Genre: Alternative metal
- Length: 3:24
- Label: Sumerian
- Songwriters: Noah Sebastian; Joakim Karlsson
- Producers: Noah Sebastian; Joakim Karlsson

Bad Omens singles chronology
"Like a Villain" (2022)	"Just Pretend" (2022)	"The Death of Peace of Mind" (2023)

Music video
- "Just Pretend" on YouTube

"Just Pretend" is a song by American heavy metal band Bad Omens for their third studio album, The Death of Peace of Mind (2022). The song was released on August 23, 2022, as the sixth single from the album.

== Background ==
The song is usually classified as an alternative metal song. It was written and produced by the band's lead vocalist and lead guitarist, Noah Sebastian and Joakim Karlsson, respectively. The song was released as the album's second official radio single in the US. An official music video for the song was released on June 8, 2023, written by Sebastian and directed by Erik Rojas.

"Just Pretend" was a critical and commercial success; as the song built virality on TikTok, it went on to become the band's first major chart success. It became a number-one hit on Billboard's Mainstream Rock Songs chart, and later topped Billboard's Alternative Airplay chart as well. The commercial success of "Just Pretend" earned the band their first certification award, being certified gold by the Recording Industry Association of America in 2023. It would eventually be certified 2x platinum in 2026. The single was also certified silver by the British Phonographic Industry on November 15, 2024.

== Composition ==
Speaking to NME, frontman Noah Sebastian revealed that "Just Pretend" was written to be a parody of "butt rock" radio hits, initially comparing it to the likes of Shinedown and Godsmack. He elaborated:

"At the time I was frustrated with people in my ear talking about, 'Oh, you need to focus on the radio. And you need to do Octane and this and that. Never having an ulterior motive when writing has always been a strict rule of ours. We just want to make music that we like and we're proud of. So with 'Just Pretend' it started as this ironic butt-rock song. Even the way I was singing in the demo I was doing this exaggerated bravado. As silly as the vocal sounded I was like, 'This is actually a really great chorus'. I was kind of just freestyling. I had written some chords and I just started singing in the booth over it. And this melody came out, the lyrics came out really quickly. So last night we just realized that a song that was written to poke fun at how easy it is to make radio rock is now No. 1 on the radio rock charts. It's the most ironic full-circle moment this band will probably ever have".

== Charts ==
=== Weekly charts ===
Weekly chart performance for "Just Pretend"
Chart (2022–24)	Peak position
Canada Rock (Billboard)	18
UK Rock & Metal (OCC)	26
US Digital Song Sales (Billboard)	45
US Hot Rock & Alternative Songs (Billboard)	11
US Rock & Alternative Airplay (Billboard)	4

=== Year-end charts ===
Year-end chart performance for "Just Pretend"
Chart (2023)	Position
US Hot Rock & Alternative Songs (Billboard)	14
US Rock Airplay (Billboard)	11

== Certifications ==
Certifications for "Just Pretend"
Region	Certification	Certified units/sales
New Zealand (RMNZ)	Gold	15,000^{‡}
United Kingdom (BPI)	Silver	200,000^{‡}
United States (RIAA)	2× Platinum	2,000,000^{‡}
^{‡} Sales+streaming figures based on certification alone.
