= Bad Omens =

American metal band

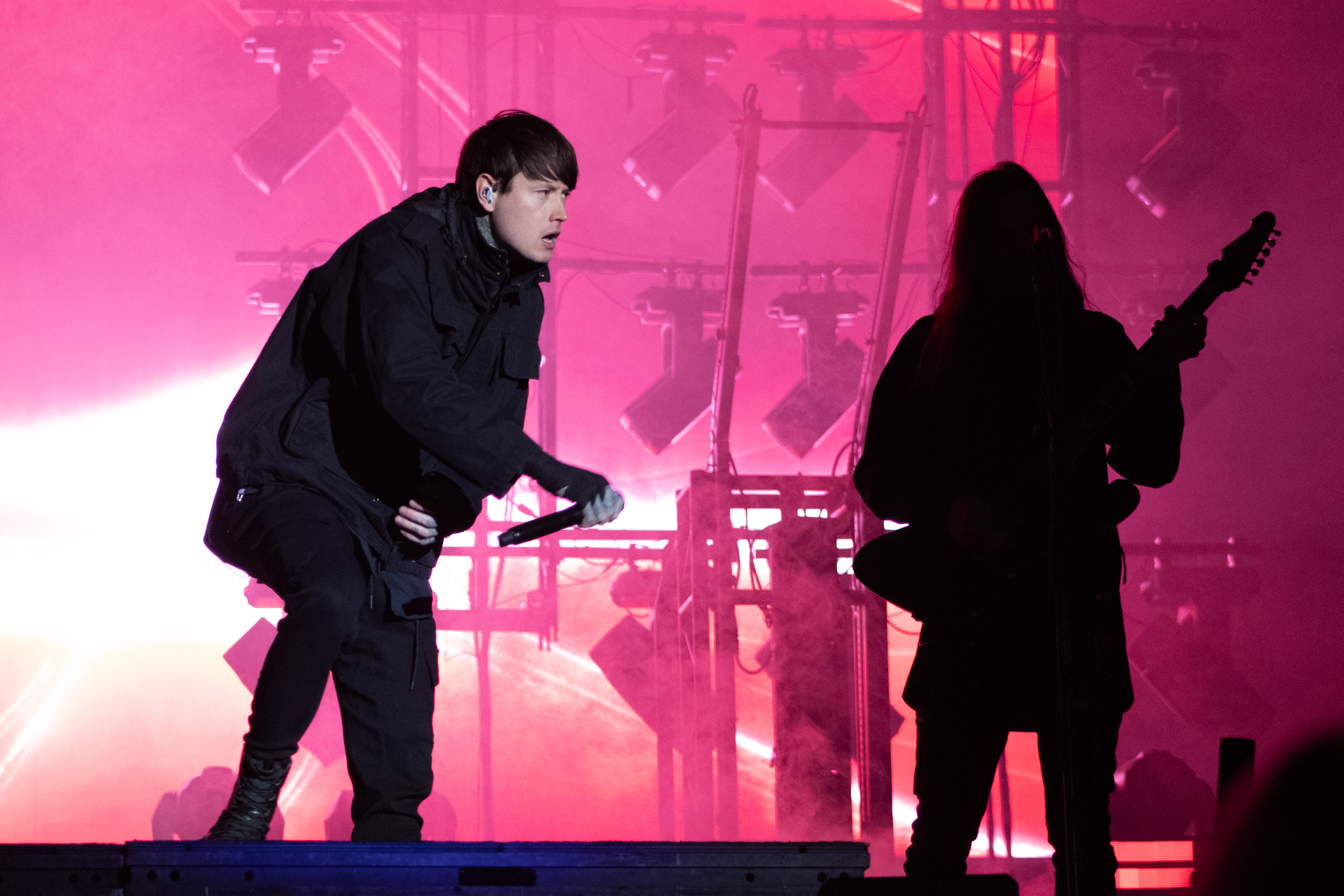
- Bad Omens in 2023

Background information
- Origin: Richmond, Virginia, U.S.
- Genres: Metalcore; alternative metal; alternative rock
- Works: Discography
- Years active: 2015–present
- Label: Sumerian
- Spinoff of: Immoralist
- Members: Nicholas Ruffilo; Noah Sebastian; Nick Folio; Joakim "Jolly" Karlsson
- Past members: Vincent Riquier
- Website: badomensofficial.com

Bad Omens is an American heavy metal band from Richmond, Virginia. Their style is primarily metalcore and alternative metal, while their more recent music also includes dark pop, R&B and electronic elements. Formed in 2015 by vocalist and producer Noah Sebastian, guitarist Nicholas Ruffilo, and bassist Vincent Riquier, the band was later joined by guitarist and producer Joakim "Jolly" Karlsson and drummer Nick Folio.

Their debut self-titled album was released in 2016 under Sumerian Records. Their second studio album, Finding God Before God Finds Me, was released in 2019. The band's third album, The Death of Peace of Mind (2022), spawned the song "Just Pretend", which is their biggest hit to date and is certified platinum by the RIAA. In 2024, they released Concrete Jungle [The OST], a compilation album and extension of their third studio album.

== History ==
=== 2013–2015: Early years ===
The idea to form Bad Omens came in 2013 when Noah Sebastian began secretly writing lyrics while also performing guitar duties for a Washington, D.C.–based act named Immoralist. In 2014, Sebastian departed from his former band, intending to start his own band. The following year in 2015, he contacted an old friend, Nicholas Ruffilo, to start the band. He then added another friend, Vincent Riquier, who introduced him to a friend from Sweden, Joakim "Jolly" Karlsson. Karlsson had known Riquier through being touring mates from one of Riquier's older projects. With those four members, the group moved out of their homes in Sweden and Richmond. Karlsson had the idea to make the move when a friend of his began a small record label that was initially producing the band's songs. Nick Folio joined after submitting an online cover of a demo the band put out while seeking a drummer. The band's name, "Bad Omens", was originally supposed to be the title of one of their early songs, which ended up becoming known as "Glass Houses". The band put out an untitled demo EP containing rough versions of their debut album tracks, which caught the eye of Sumerian Records. The EP was good enough for Sumerian to recommend taking most of the tracks and putting them on a full-length.

=== 2015–2017: Bad Omens ===
After months of rehearsal in Folio's basement, the band set off to Belleville, New Jersey, to record their debut album with producer Will Putney (Upon a Burning Body, Fit For an Autopsy, Body Count) at Graphic Nature Audio. That same year in December, the band landed a record deal and released a single and complementary music video for "Glass Houses" through the Sumerian YouTube channel. The single received some attention. A month later, the band released "Exit Wounds". They played on the Sumerian Records 10 Year Tour alongside Born of Osiris, Veil of Maya, After the Burial and Erra. In April 2016, "The Worst in Me" was released, throwing Bad Omens into the limelight with almost one-million streams in a month. This garnered Bad Omens an opening spot on the Ten Years in the Black Tour, a tenth-anniversary Sumerian Records tour headlined by Asking Alexandria, with supporting acts such as Veil of Maya (in certain shows), After the Burial, Upon a Burning Body, I See Stars and Born of Osiris. This tour not only boosted their morale as a band, but also shed light on their debut album that had just been released on August 19, 2016. The album received comparisons to Bring Me the Horizon's Sempiternal release in 2013. The same year their record came out, in 2016, they started doing live Bad Omens concert shows in sizable venues across the US as well.

Bad Omens' rising fame got them a spot on Warped Tour in 2017. The same year, Noah Sebastian worked with American deathcore act, Winds of Plague on their fifth studio album Blood of My Enemy. The band supported Parkway Drive on their Reverence tour along with Stick to Your Guns in the spring of 2018.

=== 2019–2020: Finding God Before God Finds Me ===
Bad Omens was initially scheduled to open up for The Amity Affliction and Senses Fail on their 2019 "Misery Will Find You Tour". However, the band dropped off the lineup on the day the tour was announced. Senses Fail declared the reason they had dropped off was because their logo was too small on the promotional flyer. Bad Omens quickly released a statement clarifying that they left because agreements in the signed contract were not fulfilled, and both bands were now "bullying" the group over their own failure to comply. Bad Omens concurrently released a shirt with their logo in a tiny font to parody the situation.

On December 16, 2019, Bad Omens released a new song, "Never Know", and announced the deluxe edition of their album, Finding God Before God Finds Me, which featured two other new songs: "Limits" and a Duran Duran cover of "Come Undone". On January 16, 2020, the band released the music video for the track, "Limits". A day later, they released their cover of "Come Undone".

In February and March 2020, the band embarked on their first full US headlining tour with support from Oh, Sleeper, Thousand Below, and Bloodline. On March 13, the remainder of the tour was indefinitely postponed due to the COVID-19 pandemic.

=== 2021–2024: The Death of Peace of Mind and Concrete Jungle [The OST] ===
On November 10, 2021, Bad Omens released the song "The Death of Peace of Mind", and announced their third studio album of the same name would be released on February 25, 2022. On January 19, 2022, the band released the lead single, "Like a Villain" and a music video for the song on February 2. The album was released on February 25, 2022. A music video for the song "Just Pretend" was released on June 8, 2023. "Just Pretend" became the band's biggest hit to date and is certified platinum by the RIAA. During that same year, after filling in the spot of Every Time I Die on the Voyeurist Tour with headliner Underoath, Bad Omens toured with A Day to Remember, The Ghost Inside, and Beartooth. The band later announced on August 23 that they would be headlining a North American tour with Dayseeker, Make Them Suffer, and Thousand Below. The band toured Europe in early 2023 and was followed by a short run with support from Erra and Invent Animate. Following a break during the Summer, a Fall 2023 tour took place throughout North America, supported once again by Erra as well as I See Stars.

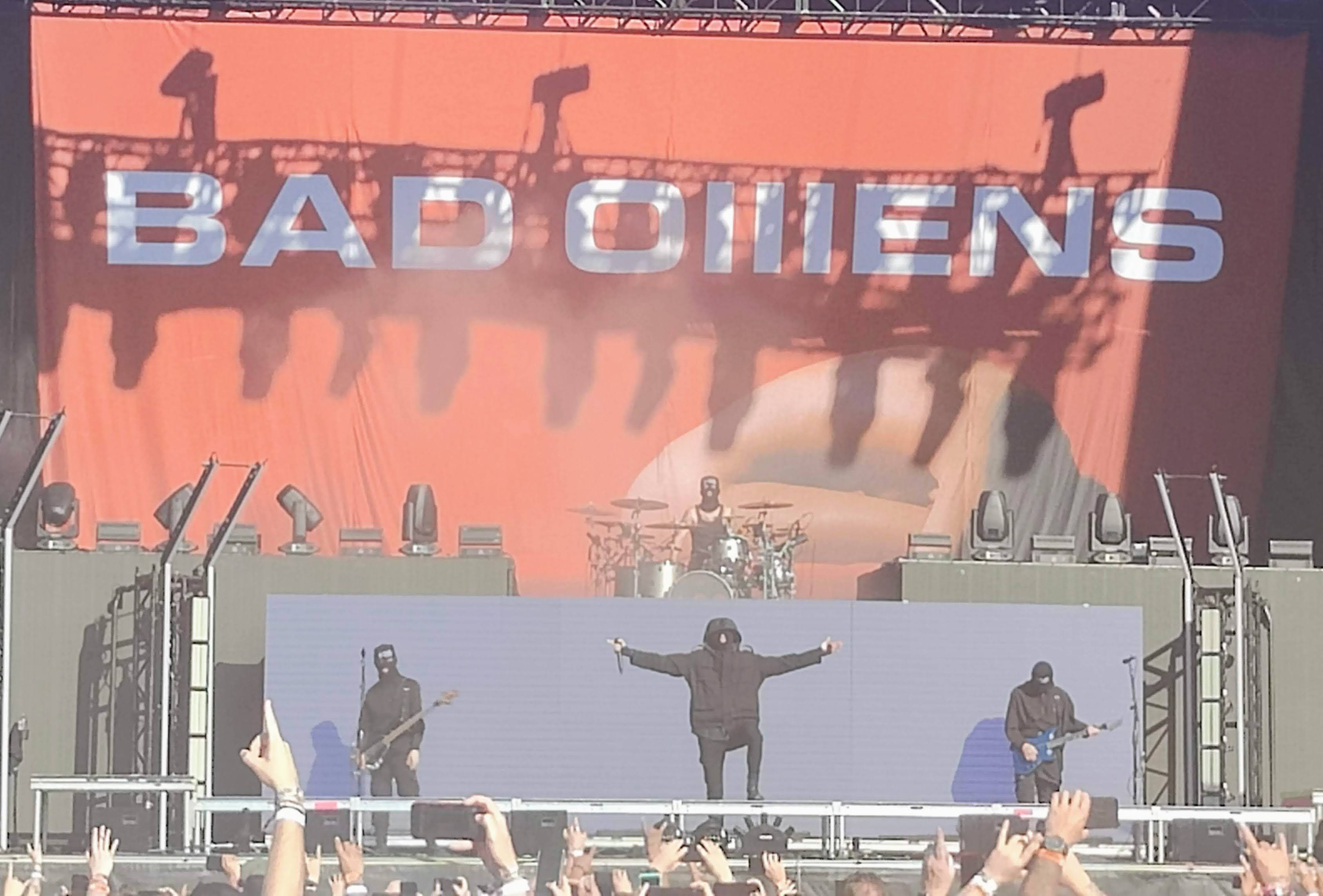
Bad Omens playing at Aftershock 2023.

In June 2023, it was confirmed Bad Omens will support Bring Me the Horizon on their tour in January 2024. On January 24, 2024, the band released "V.A.N." in collaboration with Poppy. On May 31, 2024, they released Concrete Jungle [The OST], a compilation album which has been described as an 'experimental extension' of their album, The Death of Peace of Mind.

=== 2024–present: upcoming fourth studio album ===
On August 8, 2025, the band released their first non-collaborative single in 3 years, titled "Specter". The official music video was released on August 9. On September 10, another single, titled "Impose", was released alongside its music video. On October 22, the band released a third single, titled "Dying to Love". On November 18, the fourth single, "Left for Good", was released.

In February 2026, the band kicked off a North American tour with Beartooth and President supporting.

== Musical style and influences ==
Bad Omens are primarily described as metalcore or melodic metalcore, alternative metal, and alternative rock. They have also been described as hard rock or heavy rock, and as part of the "new wave" of nu metal. Since The Death of Peace of Mind, some of their music has been described as dark pop, R&B, electronic music, and industrial metal. In 2023, Noah Sebastian said of Bad Omens' approach: "We almost start with those elements to the point that throwing in guitars or live drums is like us adding rock after the fact".

According to AllMusic, Bad Omens' music contains "punishing breakdowns and anthemic choruses that evoke contemporaries like Bring Me the Horizon and Periphery." The band have said that they have been compared to the early 2010s metalcore style of Bring Me the Horizon. This is due to Noah Sebastian's scratchy, mid-to-high pitch screaming style on their debut album which bore resemblance to Bring Me the Horizon frontman Oliver Sykes' voice on their 2013 Sempiternal release. The band have addressed these comments as "flattering, yet frustrating". Sebastian also explained that while he may have been influenced by the band, they aimed to sound unique.

The lyrical content of the band's debut revolves mostly around despair, mental health struggles, and addiction.

Bad Omens have cited influences including Bring Me the Horizon, the Plot in You, Beartooth, Health, the Weeknd, Crosses, Deftones, Linkin Park, Hans Zimmer, the 1975 and Hillsong United.

== Band members ==
Current

- Noah Sebastian – lead vocals, programming (2015–present)
- Nicholas Ruffilo – bass (2018–present); backing vocals (2015–present); rhythm guitar (2015–2018); lead guitar (2015)
- Joakim Karlsson – lead guitar, programming, backing vocals (2015–present); rhythm guitar (2018–present)
- Nick Folio – drums, percussion (2015–present)

Former

- Vincent Riquier – bass, backing vocals (2015–2018)

Touring

- Michael Taylor – lead guitar (2019), bass (2026)

Timeline

== Discography ==
Studio albums

- Bad Omens (2016)
- Finding God Before God Finds Me (2019)
- The Death of Peace of Mind (2022)
