= The Death of Peace of Mind =

Studio album by Bad Omens
- Released: February 25, 2022
- Genres: Metalcore; alternative metal; alternative rock
- Length: 53:08
- Label: Sumerian
- Producers: Noah Sebastian; Joakim Karlsson

Bad Omens chronology
Finding God Before God Finds Me (2019)	The Death of Peace of Mind (2022)	Concrete Jungle [The OST] (2024)

Singles from The Death of Peace of Mind
- 1. "The Death of Peace of Mind" Released: November 9, 2021; 2. "Like a Villain" Released: January 19, 2022; 3. "Just Pretend" Released: August 23, 2022

The Death of Peace of Mind is the third studio album by American heavy metal band Bad Omens, released on February 25, 2022, through Sumerian Records. The band produced the album themselves, with mixing and mastering by Zakk Cervini. The album mixes metalcore and alternative metal with R&B, pop and electronic music. The album cover was shot by photographer Oswaldo Cepeda.

On February 26, 2023, Bad Omens released a cappella versions of every track to commemorate the album's first anniversary.

== Musical style ==
The album has a different sound to the band's previous albums, mixing their traditional metalcore sound with R&B, pop and electronic music elements and synths. Charlie Hill of Ghost Cult Magazine described the closing track on the album, "Miracle", saying: "With dense, glitchy synths and bass taking the front seat, Sebastian follows with screaming vocals as the whole song distorts to a thunderous breakdown climax". Reviewer Simon K. said on Sputnikmusic: "the production is punchy and has a dystopian cyberpunk-ish feel to it".

== Release ==
On November 10, 2021, Bad Omens released the song "The Death of Peace of Mind", and announced their third studio album of the same name would be released on February 25, 2022.

"Making the record changed us as songwriters and musicians. In many ways, I feel like it set me free as an artist because every decision made in the writing process was for myself, with no fear for anyone else's expectations of what our third album should sound like. Be it our fans or our record label".

— Noah Sebastian (vocalist), to Rock Sound

Prior to release, the initial creation of "Somebody Else" and "The Death of Peace of Mind" were both uploaded onto YouTube by Sebastian, having live-streamed the former, and creating the other without instruments as a "quarantine sample challenge". The album spawned three radio singles: "Like a Villain", "Just Pretend", and "The Death of Peace of Mind" (which was released to radio in 2023). Other songs released digitally prior to album release were "What Do You Want from Me?", "Artificial Suicide", and "The Grey".

In September, 2023, Sumerian Comics released the first issue of a monthly tie-in comic book series that was later collected in graphic novel format. The series was written by vocalist Noah Sebastian with additional creative provided by Davis Rider, Kevin Roditeli, Nicola Izzo, and Micah Myers. The story itself was called "Concrete Jungle" and tied into the themes of the songs while adapting various scenes from music videos to tell a cohesive storyline starring the band members.

== Reception ==
Professional ratings
Review scores
Source	Rating
Distorted Sound Magazine	7/10
Ghost Cult Magazine	8/10
Kerrang!	3/5
Rock'N'Load Mag	8/10
Sputnikmusic	4.0/5
Wall of Sound	7.5/10

The album received generally positive reviews, with Paul Brown of Wall of Sound saying that "Bad Omens have more than proved themselves and their worth with The Death of Peace of Mind". Dan Stapleton of Rock'N'Load Magazine applauded the band and the album, saying "Bad Omens have created a phenomenal album here that is fresh enough to stand out against the rest of their genre while still being familiar enough to be easily accessible".

The Death of Peace of Mind won the "Best Album" award at the Heavy Music Awards 2023. In 2024, Loudwire staff elected it as the best hard rock album of 2022.

== Track listing ==
All tracks are written and produced by Noah Sebastian and Joakim Karlsson, with additional writers and producers where noted.

The Death of Peace of Mind track listing
No.	Title	Writer(s)	Producer(s)	Length
1.	"Concrete Jungle"			3:40
2.	"Nowhere to Go"			4:06
3.	"Take Me First"	Erik Ron	Ron	3:19
4.	"The Death of Peace of Mind"			4:01
5.	"What It Cost"			1:43
6.	"Like a Villain"			3:30
7.	"Bad Decisions"			4:21
8.	"Just Pretend"			3:24
9.	"The Grey"			4:06
10.	"Who Are You?"	Michael Taylor	Taylor	3:37
11.	"Somebody Else."			3:56
12.	"IDWT$"			3:22
13.	"What Do You Want from Me?"	Jesse Cash	Cash	2:55
14.	"Artificial Suicide"	Cash	Cash	3:15
15.	"Miracle"			3:45
Total length:				53:08

=== Notes ===
- "IDWT$" stands for "I Don't Want the Money".
- "Who Are You?", "Somebody Else.", and "What Do You Want from Me?" are all stylized in sentence case.
- "Concrete Jungle", The Death of Peace of Mind", and "Artificial Suicide" are all stylized in upper case.
- "Bad Decisions" is stylized in lower case.

== Personnel ==
Bad Omens

- Noah Sebastian – vocals, programming, production
- Joakim Karlsson – guitar, programming, production
- Nicholas Ruffilo – bass
- Nick Folio – drums

Production

- Zakk Cervini – mixing, mastering

== Charts ==
=== Weekly charts ===
Weekly chart performance for The Death of Peace of Mind
Chart (2022–2025)	Peak position
Australian Albums (ARIA)	14
Australian Vinyl Albums (ARIA)	1
Belgian Albums (Ultratop Flanders)	175
UK Album Downloads (OCC)	19
UK Independent Album Breakers (OCC)	16
UK Rock & Metal Albums (Official Charts)	24
US Heatseekers Albums (Billboard)	1
US Top Album Sales (Billboard)	43
US Top Current Album Sales (Billboard)	29
US Independent Albums (Billboard)	37
US Top Hard Rock Albums (Billboard)	11
US Top Rock Albums (Billboard)	44

=== Year-end charts ===
Year-end chart performance for The Death of Peace of Mind
Chart (2023)	Position
US Top Hard Rock Albums (Billboard)	14

Chart (2024)	Position
US Top Hard Rock Albums (Billboard)	23

== Certifications ==
Certifications for The Death of Peace of Mind
Region	Certification	Certified units/sales
United Kingdom (BPI)	Gold	100,000^{‡}
United States (RIAA)	Gold	500,000^{‡}
^{‡} Sales+streaming figures based on certification alone.
