= Noah Sebastian =

American singer (born 1995)

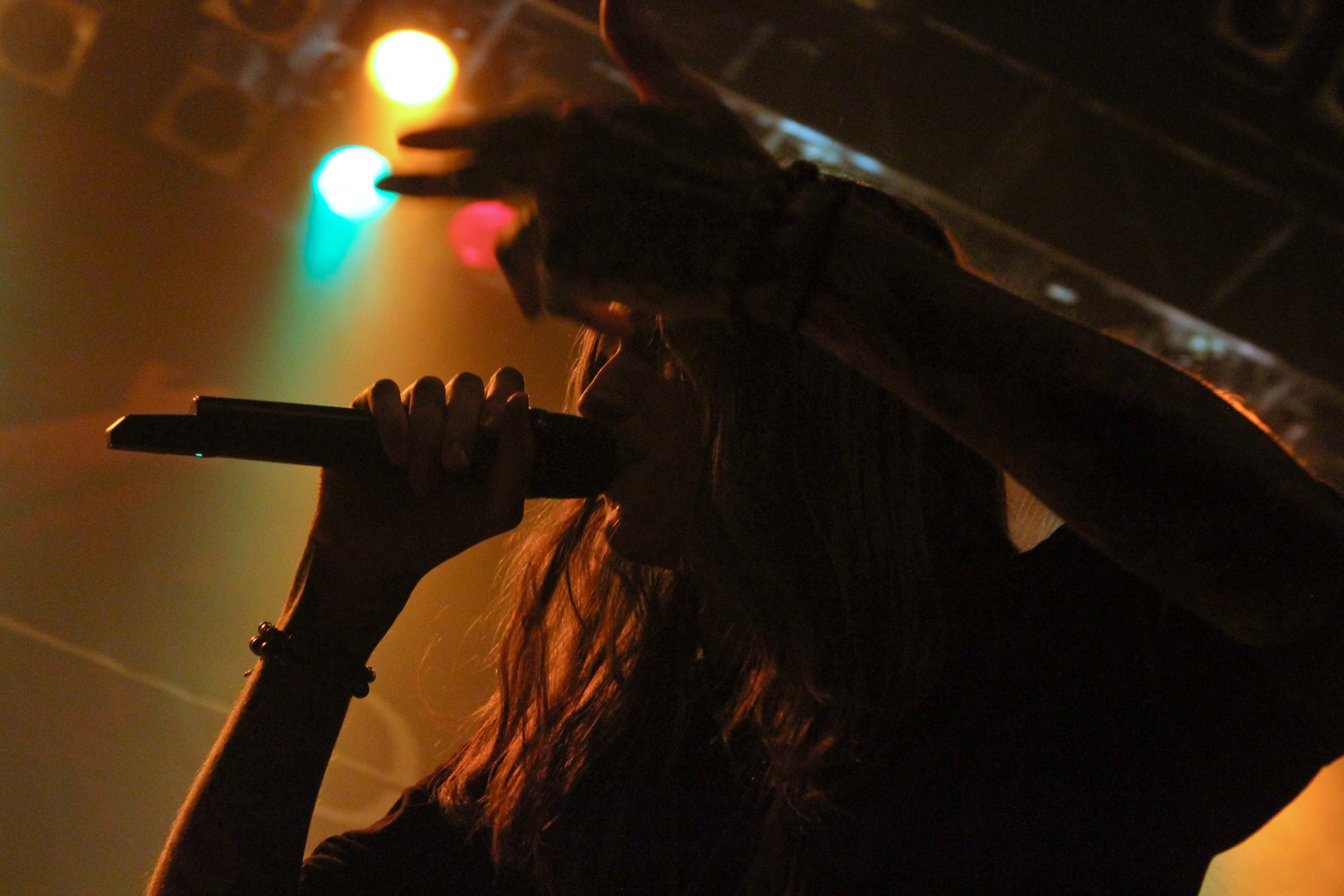
- Noah Sebastian in 2018

Background information
- Born: October 31, 1995 (age 31); Richmond, Virginia, U.S.
- Genres: Metalcore; alternative metal; alternative rock; nu metal; industrial metal; post-hardcore
- Occupations: Singer; songwriter; record producer
- Years active: 2013–present
- Member of: Bad Omens

Noah Sebastian (born October 31, 1995) is an American singer best known as the lead singer of the metal band Bad Omens. He is also the group's main songwriter and producer alongside guitarist Joakim Karlsson.

== Early life ==
Noah Sebastian was born on October 31, 1995, in Richmond, Virginia. As a teenager, he was mainly interested in hardcore punk music. He learned to play the guitar and performed in several bands.

== Career ==
At age 12, Noah Sebastian joined an Enter Shikari cover band. Inspired by the bands The Plot in You and Beartooth, at the age of 16 he began learning how to produce and compose music. The idea to form his own band came in 2013 when Sebastian began secretly writing lyrics while also performing guitar duties for a Washington, D.C.–based act named Immoralist. In 2014, Sebastian departed the band, and the following year, in 2015, he contacted an old friend, Nicholas Ruffilo, to start the band. He then added another friend, Vincent Riquier, who introduced him to a friend from Sweden, Jolly Karlsson. Karlsson had known Riquier through being touring mates from an old project of Riquier. With those four members, the group moved out of their homes in Sweden and Richmond. Karlsson had the idea to make the move when a friend of his began a small record label that was initially producing the band's songs. Nick Folio joined after submitting an online cover of a demo the band put out while seeking a drummer.

The band's name, "Bad Omens", was originally supposed to be the title of one of their early songs, which ended up becoming known as "Glass Houses". The band put out an untitled demo EP containing rough versions of their debut album tracks, which caught the eye of Sumerian Records. The EP was good enough for Sumerian to recommend taking most of the tracks and putting them on a full-length. The band was also previously known by other names, including "CHLDRN" and "Man vs. Self", before being signed by Sumerian Records and settling on "Bad Omens". After listening to a demo tape, Sumerian Records offered the band a contract and Sebastian recruited a full lineup for the band. After the release of the singles "Glass Houses" and "Exit Wounds", the group went on their first tour in 2016. Their follow-up single, "The Worst in Me", reached one million streams shortly after its release.

In June 2023, the singer participated in the Artist Friendly podcast along with Joel Madden. In October, Bad Omens had to cancel live performances due to Sebastian's health problems. On Bad Omens' joint tour with Bring Me the Horizon in 2024, he joined the stage during their show to sing "Antivist" with Oliver Sykes. In January 2024, Bad Omens released the single "V.A.N" in collaboration with singer Poppy; the vocals were performed solely by her.

== Musical style and composition ==
Sebastian wrote Bad Omens' biggest hit "Just Pretend", which went viral and was certified Platinum by the RIAA, and also directed its music video. He said that the song was originally written in a satirical way to fit the formula of a song that would be successful, which is what happened. However, the vocals pleased him, and Bad Omens tweaked the song to suit the band.

In an interview with Kerrang! magazine, he stated that he produces music based on what he likes, not what is successful and that he seeks to create music that is different from other bands. For NME, the self-taught singer said he strove to improve his vocal skills during the COVID-19 pandemic, and because of this, The Death of Peace of Mind was produced around vocals. Sebastian is lyric tenor.

Bad Omens' self-titled album was widely compared to Bring Me the Horizon's Sempiternal, and Sebastian said that in fact the band was one of his biggest inspirations.

== Personal life ==
Sebastian grew up in Richmond, Virginia with his family consisting of his mother and grandparents. At age 15, he stopped attending school and left home, moving in with friends.

He told Crunchyroll that he usually watches anime; as a child, he watched Naruto and became a fan of the series. He also mentioned Elfen Lied as one of his favorites. When asked how this influenced his music, he said that in "Suffocate", a collaboration with EDM artist Kayzo, he used a quote from Naruto.

== Discography ==
Bad Omens

- Bad Omens (2016)
- Finding God Before God Finds Me (2019)
- The Death of Peace of Mind (2022)
- Concrete Jungle [The OST] (2024)

== Collaborations ==
Year	Song	Album	Artist
2019	"Falling" (featuring Noah Sebastian & DJ Starscream)	Mood Swings	Lucifena
2019	"Nutcase" (featuring Noah Sebastian)	Single	PSYRUS
2020	"Suffocate" (featuring Noah Sebastian)	Single	Kayzo
2022	"The Dark" (featuring Noah Sebastian)	Out of Light	Scary Kids Scaring Kids
2022	"Hell Finds You Everywhere" (featuring Noah Sebastian)	Hell Finds You Everywhere	Thousand Below
2023	"One of Us" (featuring Noah Sebastian)	Hard Reset	The Word Alive
2024	"Novocaine" (featuring Noah Sebastian)	For Keeps	Too Close to Touch
2025	"Dust in the Wind" (featuring Noah Sebastian)	Queen of the Ring (Music From The Motion Picture)	Corey Taylor
