= Everyone's a Star! World Tour =

2026 concert tour by 5 Seconds of Summer

- Tour by 5 Seconds of Summer
- Promotional poster
- Location: Asia; Europe; North America; Oceania; South America
- Associated album: Everyone's a Star!
- Start date: 26 March 2026
- End date: 6 December 2026
- Legs: 4
- No. of shows: 98
- Supporting acts: The Band Camino; Cub Sport; Haiden Henderson; Master Peace; South Arcade

5 Seconds of Summer concert chronology
- The 5 Seconds of Summer Show (2023); Everyone's a Star! World Tour (2026)

The Everyone's a Star! World Tour is the sixth headlining concert tour by the Australian pop rock band 5 Seconds of Summer in support of their sixth studio album Everyone's a Star! (2026). The tour began on 26 March 2026 in Belfast at the SSE Arena and is set to conclude on 6 December 2026 in Jakarta at Indonesia Arena.

== Background ==
On 23 October 2025, before the release of the sixth studio album, Everyone's a Star!, the band announced their headlining tour dates for Europe, North America and Oceania. On 9 December 2025, the band announced tour dates for Latin America. On 4 February 2026, The Band Camino was announced as the opening act for the North American tour dates, while South Arcade, Master Peace and Haiden Henderson were announced as the opening acts for the European leg. The Band Camino were originally one of the opening acts for the No Shame Tour (Note: Later renamed the Take My Hand World Tour) but could not join the band following the rescheduled dates due to the COVID-19 pandemic. Along with this announcement, the band added three dates in North America. On 28 April 2026, Live Nation announced the band's tour dates for Asia. On 7 May 2026, the band announced that an extra date was added in Pasay (Manila) due to high demand. On 15 June 2026, they also announced seven new dates including one in Taipei and Hong Kong.

== Set list ==
This set list was taken from the show in Belfast on 26 March 2026. It does not represent all shows throughout the tour.

1. "Not OK"
2. "No.1 Obsession"
3. "Teeth"
4. "Easier"
5. "More"
6. "istillfeelthesame"
7. "No Shame"
8. "She's Kinda Hot"
9. "Boyband"
10. "Telephone Busy"
11. "Evolve"
12. "Bad Omens"
13. "Ghost of You"
14. "I'm Scared I'll Never Sleep Again"
15. "Starting Line" (Luke Hemmings song)
16. "Don't Forget You Love Me" (Calum Hood song)
17. "Have U Found What Ur Looking For?" (Ashton Irwin song)
18. "Enough" (Michael Clifford song)
19. "Amnesia"
20. "English Love Affair"
21. "Voodoo Doll"
22. "Waste the Night"
23. "Jet Black Heart"
24. "She Looks So Perfect"

Encore

25. "Everyone's a Star"
26. "Youngblood"

== Tour dates ==
List of 2026 concerts (Note: Attributed to multiple references:)
Date (2026)	City	Country	Venue	Opening acts	Attendance	Revenue
26 March	Belfast	Northern Ireland	SSE Arena	South Arcade; Master Peace	—	—
27 March	Dublin	Ireland	3Arena	South Arcade; Master Peace	—	—
30 March	Glasgow	Scotland	OVOHydro	South Arcade; Haiden Henderson	—	—
31 March	Birmingham	England	Utilita Arena	South Arcade; Haiden Henderson	—	—
2 April	London	England	O2 Arena	South Arcade; Haiden Henderson	—	—
4 April	Manchester	England	Co-op Live	South Arcade; Haiden Henderson	—	—
5 April	Cardiff	Wales	Cardiff International Arena	South Arcade; Haiden Henderson	—	—
7 April	Antwerp	Belgium	AFAS Dome	South Arcade; Master Peace	—	—
8 April	Paris	France	Accor Arena	South Arcade; Master Peace	—	—
10 April	Amsterdam	Netherlands	Ziggo Dome	South Arcade; Master Peace	—	—
13 April	Cologne	Germany	Lanxess Arena	South Arcade; Master Peace	—	—
14 April	Hamburg	Germany	Barclays Arena	South Arcade; Master Peace	—	—
16 April	Bærum (Note: Labelled as Oslo in promotional material.)	Norway	Unity Arena	South Arcade; Master Peace	—	—
18 April	Stockholm	Sweden	Hovet	South Arcade; Master Peace	—	—
19 April	Copenhagen	Denmark	Royal Arena	South Arcade; Master Peace	—	—
21 April	Berlin	Germany	Uber Arena	South Arcade; Master Peace	—	—
22 April	Łódź	Poland	Atlas Arena	South Arcade; Master Peace	—	—
24 April	Budapest	Hungary	MVM Dome	South Arcade; Master Peace	—	—
25 April	Graz	Austria	Stadhalle	South Arcade; Master Peace	—	—
27 April	Munich	Germany	Olympiahalle	South Arcade; Master Peace	—	—
28 April	Assago (Note: Labelled as Milan in promotional material.)	Italy	Forum	South Arcade; Master Peace	—	—
30 April	Madrid	Spain	Palacio Vistalegre	South Arcade; Master Peace	—	—
1 May	Valencia	Spain	Roig Arena	South Arcade; Master Peace	—	—
3 May	Lisbon	Portugal	MEO Arena	South Arcade; Master Peace	—	—
29 May	Uncasville	United States	Mohegan Sun Arena	The Band Camino	—	—
31 May	Hershey	United States	Giant Center	The Band Camino	—	—
2 June	Hamilton	Canada	TD Coliseum	The Band Camino	—	—
3 June	Montreal	Canada	Bell Centre	The Band Camino	—	—
5 June	Boston	United States	TD Garden	The Band Camino	—	—
7 June	Baltimore	United States	CFG Bank Arena	The Band Camino	—	—
9 June	Cleveland	United States	Rocket Arena	The Band Camino	—	—
11 June	Pittsburgh	United States	PPG Paints Arena	The Band Camino	—	—
13 June	New York City	United States	Madison Square Garden	The Band Camino	—	—
14 June	New York City	United States	Madison Square Garden	The Band Camino	—	—
16 June	Atlanta	United States	State Farm Arena	The Band Camino	—	—
17 June	Orlando	United States	Kia Center	The Band Camino	—	—
19 June	Nashville	United States	Bridgestone Arena	The Band Camino	—	—
21 June	Austin	United States	Moody Center	The Band Camino	—	—
23 June	Fort Worth	United States	Dickies Arena	The Band Camino	—	—
26 June	Glendale	United States	Desert Diamond Arena	The Band Camino	—	—
27 June	Anaheim	United States	Honda Center	The Band Camino	—	—
30 June	Portland	United States	Moda Center	The Band Camino	—	—
2 July	Seattle	United States	Climate Pledge Arena	The Band Camino	—	—
4 July	Vancouver	Canada	Rogers Arena	The Band Camino	—	—
5 July	Calgary	Canada	Cowboys Park	The Band Camino	—	—
7 July	Sacramento	United States	Golden 1 Center	The Band Camino	—	—
9 July	San Diego	United States	Viejas Arena	The Band Camino	—	—
11 July	Inglewood (Note: Labelled as Los Angeles in promotional material.)	United States	Kia Forum	The Band Camino	—	—
22 July	Prior Lake (Note: Labelled as Shakopee in promotional material.)	United States	Mystic Lake Amphitheater	The Band Camino	—	—
24 July	Maryland Heights (Note: Labelled as St. Louis in promotional material.)	United States	Hollywood Casino Amphitheater	The Band Camino	—	—
25 July	Noblesville	United States	Ruoff Music Center	The Band Camino	—	—
27 July	Cincinnati	United States	Riverbend Music Center	The Band Camino	—	—
29 July	Grand Rapids	United States	Acrisure Amphitheater	The Band Camino	—	—
1 August	Chicago	United States	The Salt Shed	—N/a	—	—
3 August	Darien Center	United States	Darien Lake Amphitheater	The Band Camino	—	—
5 August	Toronto	Canada	RBC Amphitheatre	The Band Camino	—	—
6 August	Clarkston	United States	Pine Knob Music Theater	The Band Camino	—	—
8 August	Camden	United States	Freedom Mortgage Pavilion	The Band Camino	—	—
9 August	Richmond	United States	Allianz Amphitheater at Riverfront	The Band Camino	—	—
12 August	Hollywood	United States	Hard Rock Live	The Band Camino	—	—
14 August	Raleigh	United States	Coastal Credit Union Music Park	The Band Camino	—	—
15 August	Charlotte	United States	Truliant Amphitheater	The Band Camino	—	—
16 August	Birmingham	United States	Coca-Cola Amphitheater	The Band Camino	—	—
18 August	Rogers	United States	The Walmart AMP	The Band Camino	—	—
20 August	Kansas City	United States	Morton Amphitheater	The Band Camino	—	—
22 August	Denver	United States	Junkyard	The Band Camino	—	—
26 August	West Valley City (Note: Labelled as Salt Lake City in promotional material.)	United States	Utah First Credit Union Amphitheatre	The Band Camino	—	—
28 August	Mountain View	United States	Shoreline Amphitheatre	The Band Camino	—	—
29 August	Paradise (Note: Labelled as Las Vegas in promotional material.)	United States	PH Live	The Band Camino	—	—
9 September	Mexico City	Mexico	Sports Palace	Bruses	—	—
11 September	Zapopan (Note: Labelled as Guadalajara in promotional material.)	Mexico	Telmex Auditorium	Bruses	—	—
16 September	Buenos Aires	Argentina	Movistar Arena	Tobika	—	—
18 September	São Paulo	Brazil	Suhai Music Hall	TBA	—	—
20 September	Belo Horizonte	Brazil	Befly Hall	TBA	—	—
22 September	Santiago	Chile	Santander Arena	TBA	—	—
24 September	Bogotá	Colombia	Movistar Arena	TBA	—	—
27 September	Lima	Peru	Costa21	TBA	—	—
24 October	Auckland	New Zealand	Spark Arena	TBA	—	—
28 October	Brisbane	Australia	Riverstage	Cub Sport	—	—
30 October	Sydney	Australia	Afterpay Arena	Cub Sport	—	—
2 November	Melbourne	Australia	Rod Laver Arena	Cub Sport	—	—
4 November	Adelaide	Australia	Adelaide Entertainment Centre	Cub Sport	—	—
6 November	Perth	Australia	Kings Park	Cub Sport	—	—
9 November	Bangkok	Thailand	UOB Live	TBA	—	—
11 November	Pasay (Note: Labelled as Manila in promotional material.)	Philippines	SM Mall of Asia Arena	TBA	—	—
12 November	Pasay	Philippines	SM Mall of Asia Arena	TBA	—	—
14 November	Jakarta	Indonesia	Indonesia Arena	TBA	—	—
16 November	Singapore		The Star Theatre	TBA	—	—
17 November	Kuala Lumpur	Malaysia	Unifi Arena	Insomniacks	—	—
19 November	Goyang (Note: Labelled as Seoul in promotional material.)	South Korea	KINTEX Hall 9	TBA	—	—
21 November	Tokyo	Japan	SGC Hall Ariake	TBA	—	—
22 November	Tokyo	Japan	SGC Hall Ariake	TBA	—	—
25 November	Taipei	Taiwan	TBA	TBA	—	—
27 November	Hong Kong		TBA	TBA	—	—
29 November	Pasay	Philippines	SM Mall of Asia Arena	TBA	—	—
3 December	Singapore		The Star Theatre	TBA	—	—
4 December	Kuala Lumpur	Malaysia	Unifi Arena	Insomniacks	—	—
6 December	Jakarta	Indonesia	Indonesia Arena	TBA	—	—

=== Cancelled concert dates ===
Date (2026)	City	Country	Venue	Reason	Ref.
September 12	Monterrey	Mexico	Citibanamex Auditorium	Ashton Irwin's sickness	

== Personnel ==
- Luke Hemmings – lead vocals, rhythm guitar, piano
- Michael Clifford – lead guitar, vocals, piano
- Calum Hood – bass guitar, keyboard, vocals
- Ashton Irwin – drums, percussion, vocals
