= Ella Red =

American musician (born 2003)

- Ella Red in 2026

Background information
- Born: September 3, 2003 (age 23); Frisco, Texas, U.S.
- Genres: Alternative pop; Indie pop
- Occupations: Musician; singer-songwriter
- Years active: 2023–present
- Label: Nettwerk Music Group
- Website: ellared.com

Ella Red (born September 3, 2003) is an American singer-songwriter. She began releasing music independently in 2023 and gained wider attention with the singles "Put Your Money Where Your Mouth Is" and "I Like You Best," the latter of which accumulated millions of streams.

She released her debut album, IT'S NOT REAL, in 2026, preceded by the singles "Ball and Chain" and "Parasite." Red is based in Frisco, Texas, and her music has been described as alternative pop, with themes including femininity, sexuality, identity and relationships.

== Early life ==
Ella Red was born on September 3, 2003, in the Frisco, Texas area. She has at least one sister. As a child, Red experienced strong existential anxiety, particularly about death and the eventual end of the universe. She recalled lying awake thinking about such subjects and waking her mother to tell her that she did not want to die. She described writing as the primary outlet for such thoughts and emotions, and music as the medium through which she felt best able to express them. Red was exposed to music from an early age, initially through a piano in her family home that her mother sometimes played. She first learned music by singing her lullabies and matching the notes on the piano.

Red began writing songs as a teenager, but did not begin taking lyric writing seriously until her freshman or sophomore year of high school. She initially focused on classical music before moving toward the development of her own musical style. Red grew up playing piano, cello, and guitar. As of November 2024 she was living with her parents in Frisco.

== Career ==
=== Early career ===
Red originally did not intend to become a performer, entering the music industry hoping to work primarily as a songwriter behind other artists' songs. She released her first single, "Put Your Money Where Your Mouth Is", in 2023. It was inspired by her observations of contemporary hookup culture and what she viewed as its negative effects on relationships. The song received enough radio play in Denver that she was asked to perform in a holiday show in the city that December. She had performed in only two small shows before that performance, and struggled with stage fright and social anxiety. Red described herself as having "blacked out the entire show," adding, "I can remember maybe two things that happened and that they loved me but that's it; I had to sink or swim". Her mother was involved in the early development of her career and at one point served as her manager, learning about the music industry alongside Red in an effort to help protect her.

"Put Your Money Where Your Mouth Is," received about 500,000 Spotify streams by November 2024 and performed well on radio charts upon release. Red said of her initial reaction to the song's success: "I didn't understand what was going on. I was so new to the scene." A few months after the song's release, she began opening for Lovejoy in Denver, followed by a radio tour and a stint opening for pop musician Morgan St. Jean throughout the Midwest in September 2024. Red released about a dozen songs in the first year of her career, gaining almost 200,000 monthly listeners.

Red followed "Put Your Money Where Your Mouth Is" with "I Like You Best", for which she intentionally used a rhythmic structure similar to the earlier song. "I Like You Best" addresses female sexuality and sexual autonomy, and openly discusses themes like desire, intimacy and physical closeness. Red wrote the song in part for her significant other, and also as a means of expressing her sexuality and helping others articulate similar feelings. It became an online success, accumulating more than 2 million streams by November 2024 and averaging around 20,000 streams per day. The song led to her becoming booked as a supporting act on larger tours, and Montreal Rocks writer Steve Gerrard said "I Like You Best" "push[ed] her name into the wider pop conversation". However, Red deliberately sought not to duplicate its sound or formula, wishing to be known for what she considered "more substantial music". She attributed some of her rapid audience growth to social media and Spotify editorial playlists. She was featured on Spotify's Next Gen Singer-Songwriters and SALT playlists.

Red performed in several shows in the Dallas area in late 2024, and performed at the State Fair of Texas that year. By December 2024, Red had signed with the Nettwerk Music Group. She had been wary of signing with a major label out of a desire to avoid agreements she might regret later, but signed with Nettwerk because she needed additional financial resources, assistance, and industry connections. She began performing new songs that had not yet been publicly released, like "Parasite" and "We're All Gonna Die". She opened for singer-songwriter LØLØ in February and March of that year. In 2025, she worked with singer-songwriter and labelmate Peggy on the song "Alice".

=== IT'S NOT REAL (2026) ===
Red's debut album, IT'S NOT REAL, was released on January 23, 2026, when she was 22 years old. It featured several songs she wrote as a teenager and developed further as she got older, which she had performed on tour for several years. Red described the album as representing "a lot of fears," exploring introspection, existential themes, self-understanding, the cyclical nature of humanity, and her experience growing up as a woman. She said it reflected a period during which she was still developing her songwriting process and learning how to write both alone and with collaborators. Red said the album represented a significant amount of musical experimentation for her, and that she wanted the songs to communicate emotion through more than melody and lyrics, emphasizing the overall feeling produced by the music.

IT'S NOT REAL includes 13 tracks, with the songs "Ball and Chain" and "Parasite" released as singles before the album. Red described the opening track, "Parasite", as the first song she wrote without feeling constrained by what she believed she was supposed to do as a songwriter, and also the first on which she felt she had been genuinely vulnerable. "Ball and Chain" explores themes like self-destructive behavior, psychological struggles, feeling trapped within one's own thoughts, and criticism of societal superficiality. The song "He Asked for It", in which Red describes murdering a man, uses and reclaims language historically used to blame women for violence against them. The lyrics address and reverse conventional ideas surrounding the objectification of women. Red said the response to "He Asked for It" matched what she had hoped for, with listeners sharing personal experiences with her and telling her that the song helped them regain a sense of power.

The song "Always the Artist" grew from Red's feelings about the way she experiences and expresses romantic love, while the track "Aphrodite" explores the pressure placed on women to derive their value from physical appearance, reflecting her own difficulties surrounding body image and self-perception. Red described "Aphrodite" as particularly meaningful to perform live because of the emotional connection she feels with the audience during it. The song "Cupid" began as a song about what Red imagined an ex-partner might be thinking about her following a breakup, but later developed into a song connected to her sister and the sister's breakup. The titular closing track, IT'S NOT REAL, explores ideas about existence, time, humanity repeating its history and art as a way of leaving something behind.

Olivier Fluchaire of mxdwn.com characterizes IT'S NOT REAL as cathartic, dramatic and emotionally intense, writing that Red's songwriting works particularly well when vulnerability and restraint take precedence over the album's larger conceptual ambitions. Montreal Rocks writer Steve Gerrard said of the album: "The alt-pop songwriter pulls together years of restless questions about existence, identity, fear, and femininity, transforming them into something theatrical, gothic, and deeply intimate." Amanda McArthur of Sweety High wrote that Red had "never been quite so engrossing and cathartic" than with IT'S NOT REAL, writing that it highlights Ella's unique strengths as a pop storyteller. Red followed the album's release with a debut headline tour in February and March 2026, performing in 16 cities across North America, with Peggy also performing with her.

== Musical style and artistry ==
Red's music has been described as alternative pop and indie pop, with the Dallas Observer describing her as part of the contemporary "femme-pop" movement. Olivier Fluchaire of mxdwn.com described her musical style as "high-drama" and "cathartic pop" with confessional elements. Red has called her music "female alt-pop," saying, "I wanted to lean into that as much as possible" when she began her career. Red's influences include Lady Gaga, Billie Eilish, and Sofia Isella, particularly for Gaga's bold melodies, Isella's clever lyrics, and Eilish's cleverness with both melodies and lyrics. She has also described Chandler Leighton and Dove Cameron as influences.

Red has said her songwriting "normally starts with a single line, followed by fleshing out the idea further by doing a repetitive, mindless activity," often while driving or sitting at a piano playing the same chords repeatedly. She does not force herself to write on command, preferring to wait until inspiration occurs naturally. Much of her songwriting inspiration comes from her own experiences and the experiences of people around her. Red has said she believes her strongest lyrical work occurs when she can connect emotionally with and embody the story she is telling.

Red has described being required to maintain a substantial social media presence as one of the more difficult parts of being an artist because it exposes her to constant public judgment. She said social tends to reward brief, immediately catchy portions of songs rather than the complete artistic work, which she fears creates pressure for artists to make surface-level material designed for short-form consumption rather than work intended to challenge listeners. At the same time, she has acknowledged that social media can be an effective tool for music discovery.

== Personal life ==
Red writes poetry in addition to songwriting. She enjoys learning languages and has expressed interest in writing songs in English, French, Japanese, Korean, and Chinese. She had a kitten named Ratatouille as of February 2026. Red frequently uses social media and particularly enjoys watching videos on YouTube, crediting it for teaching her "quite literally every skill I have". She has described her phobias as "death, deep water, and men".
