= Telephone Busy =

Single by 5 Seconds of Summer

from the album Everyone's a Star!
- Released: 23 October 2025
- Length: 3:15
- Label: Republic
- Songwriters: Luke Hemmings; Calum Hood; Ashton Irwin; Michael Clifford; Simon Wilcox; Jason Evigan; Leland
- Producer: Jason Evigan

5 Seconds of Summer singles chronology
"Boyband" (2025)	"Telephone Busy" (2025)	"Everyone's a Star!" (2025)

"Telephone Busy" is a song by the Australian pop rock band 5 Seconds of Summer. It was released on 23 October 2025, as the third single from their sixth studio album, Everyone's a Star!. "Telephone Busy" has received generally positive reviews from critics, who highlight its infectious bassline, catchy chorus, and blend of dark-pop nostalgia with a refined, mature sound.

== Background and release ==
"Telephone Busy" was first previewed when the group performed the song during a free pop-up show in Los Angeles at The Sun Rose in West Hollywood. It was later released officially with no prior announcement, as a surprise single.

== Composition ==
"Telephone Busy" was written by Luke Hemmings, Calum Hood, Ashton Irwin, Michael Clifford, Simon Wilcox, Jason Evigan and Leland, while production was handled by Jason Evigan. The track is described as "bass-heavy," featuring the band's "signature ability to blend experimental production with catchy pop sensibilities." Lyrically, the song reflects on the theme of self-destruction and yearning.

Speaking to Official Charts Company in November 2025, Calum Hood said "We wrote a lot of the tracks in Nashville. It's kind of the first time we've ever done a camp-esque session. We went there (Nashville) with some of our favourite writers and producers and hunkered down, writing as many songs as we could. Ashton moved into the house and made a studio in the living room. I don't know what happened in the 10 hours that Ashton was in that room, but everyone came back and he had Telephone Busy and I was like, this is the most amazing thing I've ever heard in my life."

== Critical reception ==
Anissa Sanchez of EUPHORIA described the song as "reminiscent of the band's Youngblood era, blending polished dark-pop production with the punch of alternative-leaning instrumentation. Nostalgia lingers in its melody, making a subtle nod to their sophomore album, Sounds Good Feels Good, but those sensibilities are balanced by a refined sense of maturity and emotional depth."

== Personnel ==
Credits for "Telephone Busy" adapted from digital liner notes.

5 Seconds of Summer

- Luke Hemmings – vocals, rhythm guitar
- Calum Hood – vocals, bass guitar
- Michael Clifford – vocals, lead guitar
- Ashton Irwin – vocals, drums, additional guitar

Additional musicians

- Jason Evigan – background vocals, bass, guitar, synthesizer, programming
- Simon Wilcox – background vocals

Production

- Jason Evigan – producer, vocal producer, engineer
- Lewis Pesacov – additional producer
- Serban Ghenea – mixing
- Jackson Rau – engineer
- Lewis Pesacov – additional engineer
- Sam Roberts – additional engineer
- Coleman Reichenbach – additional engineer
- Boston Bodvig – additional engineer
- Evelyn Faivre – additional engineer
- Bryce Bordone – assist mixing
- Nathan Dantzler – mastering
- Harrison Tate – mastering

== Charts ==
Chart performance for "Telephone Busy"
Chart (2025)	Peak position
Australian Artist Singles (ARIA)	18
New Zealand Hot Singles (RMNZ)	23

== Release history ==
Release dates and formats for "Telephone Busy"
Region	Date	Format	Label	Ref.
Various	23 October 2025	Digital download	Republic	
United States	31 October 2025	Contemporary hit radio	Republic	
