= Boyband (5 Seconds of Summer song) =

Single by 5 Seconds of Summer

from the album Everyone's a Star!
- Released: 16 October 2025
- Genre: Pop-punk
- Length: 2:57
- Label: Republic
- Songwriters: Ashton Irwin; Calum Hood; Jason Evigan; John Ryan; Luke Hemmings; Simon Wilcox
- Producers: Jason Evigan; John Ryan

5 Seconds of Summer singles chronology
"Not OK" (2025)	"Boyband" (2025)	"Telephone Busy" (2025)

Music video
- "Boyband" on YouTube

"Boyband" is a song by Australian pop rock band 5 Seconds of Summer. It was released through Republic Records on 16 October 2025 as the second single from their sixth studio album, Everyone's a Star! (2025).

The track's title was revealed alongside the rest of the album's track list on 24 September 2025. On the same day, the band performed at The Sun Rose in West Hollywood, California, where they debuted the track.

At the 2026 AACTA Awards, it was nominated for Audience Choice Award for Favourite Australian Music Video.

== Background ==
In their interview with Rolling Stone, 5 Seconds of Summer spoke about "Boyband", revealing it initially featured darker undertones, stating, "It started from this dark but funny place, like getting called a boy band and having those egotistical feelings." The track was brought up when asked about the member of English-Irish boy band One Direction, Liam Payne, who died in October 2024. Luke Hemmings stated Payne's passing affected the band, and that "all that anger and frustration, and sadness and grief" have influenced the song.

== Composition ==
"Boyband" was written by Ashton Irwin, Calum Hood, Jason Evigan, John Ryan, Luke Hemmings and Simon Wilcox, while production was handled Jason Evigan and John Ryan. Musically, the track finds the group returning to their pop punk sound, while blending a synth-driven sound. Lyrically, the song is tongue-in-cheek, highlighting the ups of being in the public eye, but ultimately touching on the subject of the downsides and harsh realities of living too much in the spotlight. "This song is about us owning that narrative and taking the power back," the band said of the song and being labelled as a "boyband" during their earlier years.

== Music video ==
The band performed a bait and switch prank on their fans by uploading a video titled "5 Seconds of Summer - Boyband (Official Video)" to their official YouTube channel, but switching to a tour announcement after playing the first few seconds of the song.

== Personnel ==
Credits for "Boyband" adapted from digital liner notes.

5 Seconds of Summer

- Luke Hemmings – vocals, rhythm guitar
- Calum Hood – vocals, bass guitar
- Michael Clifford – vocals, lead guitar
- Ashton Irwin – vocals, drums, additional guitar

Additional musicians

- Jason Evigan – background vocals, guitar, keyboards, programming

Production

- Jason Evigan – producer, vocal producer, engineer
- John Ryan – producer
- Lewis Pesacov – additional producer
- Serban Ghenea – mixing
- Jackson Rau – engineer
- Sam Roberts – additional engineer
- Coleman Reichenbach – additional engineer
- Boston Bodvig – additional engineer
- Evelyn Faivre – additional engineer
- Bryce Bordone – assist mixing
- Nathan Dantzler – mastering
- Harrison Tate – mastering
- John Hanes – immersive mixing engineer

== Charts ==
Chart performance for "Boyband"
Chart (2025)	Peak position
Lithuania Airplay (TopHit)	85
New Zealand Hot Singles (RMNZ)	24
