= Fly Away (5 Seconds of Summer song) =

Promotional single by 5 Seconds of Summer

from the album Sounds Good Feels Good
- Released: 14 August 2015
- Genre: Pop punk; pop rock
- Length: 3:32
- Label: Capitol; Hi or Hey
- Songwriters: Luke Hemmings; Calum Hood; John Feldmann
- Producer: Feldmann

"Fly Away" is a song by Australian pop rock band 5 Seconds of Summer. It was released on 14 August 2015 as the first promotional single from their second studio album, Sounds Good Feels Good.

== Background and release ==
"Fly Away" premiered on Australian radio station Nova 96.9 on 13 August 2015, before it was released for digital download the following day. Fans who pre-ordered their second studio album, Sounds Good Feels Good, would receive the song for free. The track had been teased earlier in March 2015 in a tweet by bassist Calum Hood.

== Composition and lyrics ==
"Fly Away" was written by Calum Hood and Luke Hemmings, as well as John Feldmann who also produced the track. Speaking about the song with Fuse.tv, Feldmann stated,

"We had this Third Eye Blind, pop-punk chorus that really worked. We ended up writing a song about a perfect day: It just rained so it felt like London, we were in California so we were talking about the ocean. Luke came up with the lyrics 'open ocean,' and I fought him with that. What the fuck does that even mean? You're in the middle of the ocean on a boat? Where does that connect with this goddamn song? He forced it through and in hindsight, I'm glad he did."

According to Feldmann, Hood came into the studio and already had the lyrics and melody started, while Hemmings wrote the bridge of the track. He also described the song as a "Foo Fighters, driving, guitar-driven rock tune." "Fly Away" is about, "escaping heart ache, misery and sadness in favour for travelling the world and finding paradise."

== Critical reception ==
Maria Sherman of Fuse.tv stated that the track sounds similar to "2002 Good Charlotte and 2006 All Time Low with a modern twist." Carolyn Menyes of Music Times described the song as early 2000s pop punk, comparing the sound to Jimmy Eat World. She also added, "With a speedy tempo and those signature shouted snarls that fans of 5SOS are all too familiar with, this new track helps to expand 5 Seconds of Summer's exploration of what exactly pop-punk can be in 2015."

== Chart performance ==
"Fly Away" debuted on the Billboard Hot 100 at number 100. The song also peaked at number six on the Irish Singles Chart. The track reached number three on the Sweden Digital Song Sales chart.

== Personnel ==
5 Seconds of Summer

- Luke Hemmings – lead vocals, rhythm guitar
- Calum Hood – lead vocals, bass guitar
- Michael Clifford – lead vocals, lead guitar
- Ashton Irwin – drums, backing vocals

Production

- John Feldmann – producer, recording
- Allie Snow – assistant recording engineer
- Luke Shrestha – assistant recording engineer
- Justin Long – mixing engineer assistant
- Cian Riordan – mixing engineer assistant
- Matthew Pauling – additional producer, editor, engineer, programming
- Zakk Cervini – additional producer, editor, engineer, programming
- Eric Valentine – mastering, mixing

== Charts ==
Chart performance for "Fly Away"
Chart (2015)	Peak position
Australia (ARIA)	26
Austria (Ö3 Austria Top 40)	60
Canada (Canadian Hot 100)	84
France (SNEP)	138
Ireland (IRMA)	6
Scotland (OCC)	69
Sweden Digital Song Sales (Billboard)	3
UK Singles (OCC)	44
US Billboard Hot 100	100
