= Jet Black Heart =

2015 single by 5 Seconds of Summer

Single by 5 Seconds of Summer

from the album Sounds Good Feels Good
- Released: 13 December 2015
- Genre: Pop punk
- Length: 3:41
- Label: Capitol; Hi or Hey
- Songwriters: Calum Hood; Michael Clifford; David Hodges; Jon Green
- Producer: David Hodges

5 Seconds of Summer singles chronology
"Hey Everybody!" (2015)	"Jet Black Heart" (2015)	"Girls Talk Boys" (2016)

Music video
- "Jet Black Heart" on YouTube

"Jet Black Heart" is a song by Australian pop rock band 5 Seconds of Summer from their second studio album, Sounds Good Feels Good. It was written by Calum Hood, Michael Clifford, David Hodges and Jon Green, and produced by David Hodges. It was released on 13 December 2015 as the album's third and final single. It charted in eight countries and won a Verano MTV Award and a Teen Choice Award. The music video was released on 17 December via YouTube and has since gained more than 30 million views. The song's title was based upon the popular band "Joan Jet and the black hearts."

== Background and release ==
The single was first premiered on air on New Zealand radio on 27 August 2015. It was released as a promotional single on 28 August, an instant download after the album was pre-ordered. It was then sent for radio airplay on 13 December, being released as an official single.

The band performed the song for the first time on stage during their Rock Out with Your Socks Out Tour on the second night of their show at Long Island.

== Composition ==
"Jet Black Heart" was written by Calum Hood, Michael Clifford, David Hodges and Jon Green, and produced by David Hodges. Clifford stated, "It's the song I'm most proud of." MTV described the track as "a whole lot darker than 'She's Kinda Hot'."

== Critical reception ==
"Jet Black Heart" was met with positive reviews from music critics. Carolyn Menyes of Music Times compared the track to Yellowcard's "Only One" for its pop-punk sound and emotional lyrics. She stated, "The song continues the band's new tendency toward introspective lyrics, as they sing about being cold and broken but still feeling in love despite emotional turmoil." Jessica Thomas of Renowned for Sound noted that the song, "boasts an angst-ridden tune with lyrical and instrumental depth. Counting in with a deep beat, opening with electric riffs and leading with a steady bass line." She called the track, "a much grittier side to the 5 Seconds Of Summer brand."

== Music video ==
The official music video was released on 17 December 2015, featuring the band members and some of their fans. Directed by Tom Van Schelven, the video starts off with a message from the band that reads "We asked our fans to help make this video. We wanted to hear your stories. We were overwhelmed with the response. This video goes out to you. Jet Black Heart."

== Track listing ==
Digital download
No.	Title	Length
1.	"Jet Black Heart"	3:41

== Awards and nominations ==
Awards and nominations for "Jet Black Heart"
Year	Organization	Award	Result	Ref(s)
2016	MTV Spain	Video Del Verano	Won	
2016	Teen Choice Awards	Best Rock Song	Won	

== Personnel ==
5 Seconds of Summer

- Luke Hemmings – lead vocals, rhythm guitar
- Michael Clifford – lead vocals, lead guitar, composer, lyricist
- Calum Hood – lead vocals, bass guitar, composer, lyricist
- Ashton Irwin – backing vocals, drums

Production

- David Hodges – composer, lyricist, producer
- Jon Green – composer, lyricist

== Charts ==
Chart history for "Jet Black Heart"
Chart (2015–2016)	Peak position
Australia (ARIA)	34
France (SNEP)	152
Ireland (IRMA)	78
Mexico Ingles Airplay (Billboard)	47
Netherlands (Single Top 100)	98
Sweden Heatseeker (Sverigetopplistan)	14
UK Singles (OCC)	60
US Billboard Hot 100	95

== Certifications ==
Certifications for "Jet Black Heart"
Region	Certification	Certified units/sales
Australia (ARIA)	Gold	35,000^{‡}
^{‡} Sales+streaming figures based on certification alone.

== Release history ==
Release dates and formats for "Jet Black Heart"
Region	Date	Format	Label	Ref.
Various	28 August 2015	Digital download	Capitol; Hi or Hey	
United Kingdom	13 December 2015	Contemporary hit radio	Capitol; Hi or Hey	
