= Hey Everybody! =

Single by 5 Seconds of Summer

from the album Sounds Good Feels Good
- Released: 14 September 2015
- Recorded: 2015
- Length: 3:16
- Label: Capitol; Hi or Hey
- Songwriter(s): Calum Hood; Stefan Johnson; Jordan Johnson; Marcus Lomax; Clarence Coffee Jr.; Joel Madden; Benji Madden; John Taylor; Roger Taylor; Andy Taylor; Simon Le Bon; Nick Rhodes
- Producer(s): The Monsters and the Strangerz; John Feldmann

5 Seconds of Summer singles chronology
"She's Kinda Hot" (2015)	"Hey Everybody!" (2015)	"Jet Black Heart" (2015)

Music video
- "Hey Everybody!" on YouTube

"Hey Everybody!" is a song by Australian pop rock band 5 Seconds of Summer. The song is the second single from the band's second album Sounds Good Feels Good. The song contains elements from "Hungry Like the Wolf" by Duran Duran, who were given a writing credit on the song.

== Promotion ==
The band performed the track on Alan Carr: Chatty Man Stand Up to Cancer special, broadcast on 26 October 2015, and TFI Friday on 6 November 2015. It was later performed at the American Music Awards, on The Ellen DeGeneres Show, BBC Radio 1's Live Lounge, Sirius XM Radio, at the Radio 1 Teen Awards, on On Air with Ryan Seacrest, Elvis Duran and The Late Late Show with James Corden.

== Music video ==
The video directed by Isaac Rentz, shot in Los Angeles, California begins with the band members working menial jobs, Calum as a dog walker, Ashton as a dino suit wearing birthday party entertainer, Michael as a street mascot promoting hot dogs and Luke as a mercilessly abused office desk drone. Fantasy sequences depict goofing off at a palatial Pasadena mansion with middle-aged men as bagpipers, scenes of Mexican-style wrestling, polo players on segways, water sliding in body taping, throwing money around and camera mugging dressed like hustler/pimp/gangsta-rappers, hunting Ashton in animal suits through a low-cut hedgemaze, ending with Ashton beaten with pool noodles. Ashton throws the birthday cake on the ground, then the band member soak in a hot tub with one of the wrestlers, ignoring the mega-sized pizza that has just been ordered, and then they all jump in the pool. A narrator announces the fate of each band member.

== Track listing ==
- Digital download
1. "Hey Everybody!" – 3:16
- German CD single
1. "Hey Everybody!" (radio edit)
2. "Over and Out" – 2:59

== Personnel ==
- Luke Hemmings – lead vocals, rhythm guitar
- Michael Clifford – lead vocals, lead guitar
- Calum Hood – backing vocals, bass guitar
- Ashton Irwin – backing vocals, drums

== Charts ==
Chart performance for "Hey Everybody!"
Chart (2015)	Peak position
Australia (ARIA)	70
Belgium (Ultratip Bubbling Under Flanders)	12
Belgium (Ultratip Bubbling Under Wallonia)	17
Canada CHR/Top 40 (Billboard)	47
Germany (GfK)	74
Ireland (IRMA)	49
Mexico Ingles Airplay (Billboard)	15
Netherlands (Dutch Top 40 Tiparade)	11
Slovakia (Rádio Top 100)	65
UK Singles (OCC)	49
US Bubbling Under Hot 100 Singles (Billboard)	16
US Pop Airplay (Billboard)	23
