= Simon Wilcox =

Canadian singer songwriter

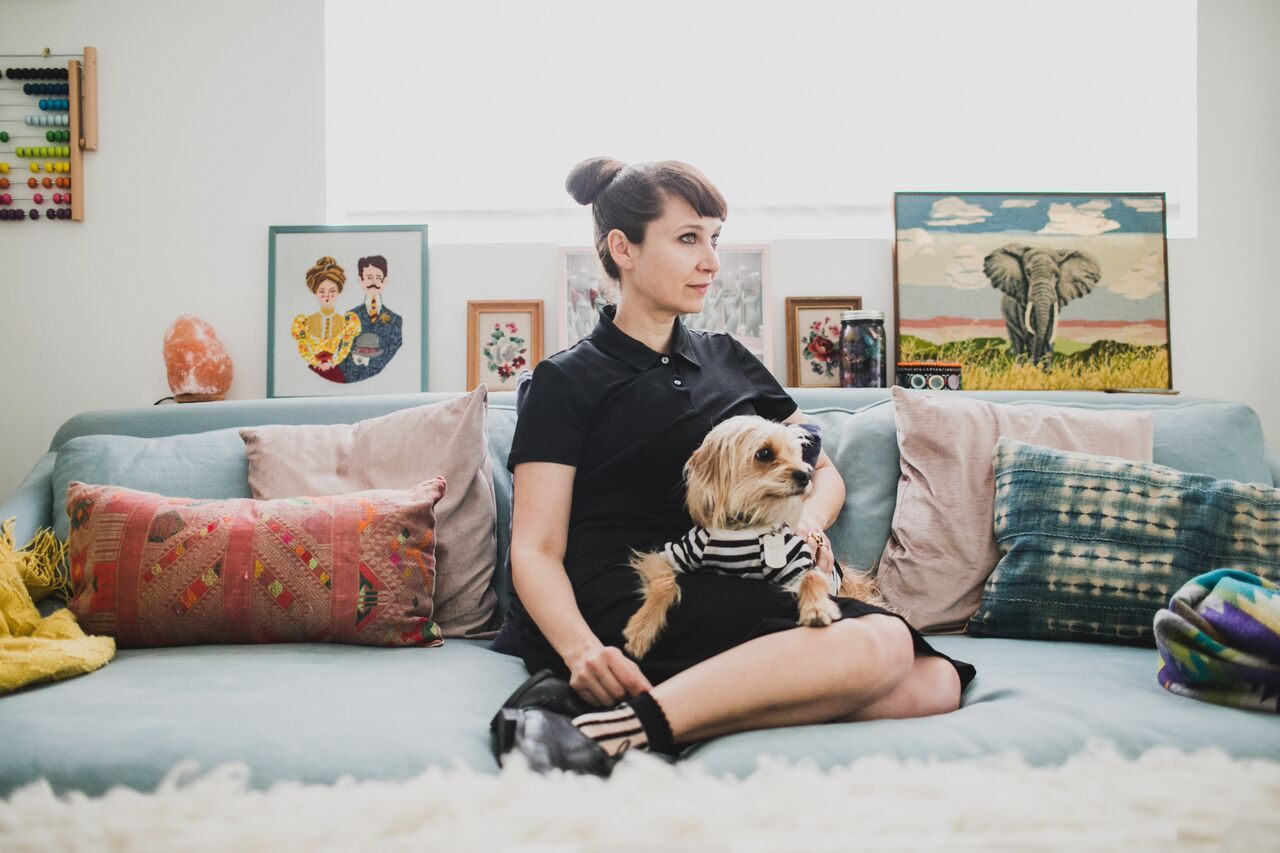
- 2017
- Born: August 26, 1976 (age 50); Hamilton, Ontario, Canada
- Education: OCAD University
- Occupations: Songwriter; singer
- Musical career
- Origin: Ottawa, Ontario, Canada
- Genre: Pop

Simon Wilcox is a Canadian poet and songwriter, based in Los Angeles, California. Her songs have been recorded and released by Blink-182, Britney Spears, Carly Rae Jepsen, Enrique Iglesias, Miranda Lambert, The Used, Nick Jonas, Camila Cabello, Selena Gomez, Fever 333, Royal and the Serpent, Five Seconds of Summer, Goldfinger, Demi Lovato, Charlie Puth, Steve Aoki, Rita Ora, Liam Payne, Nessa Barrett, Zella Day, Paris Hilton, Josh Groban, Natasha Bedingfield, Petula Clark, Don Felder, Three Days Grace, Lennon Stella, Albert Hammond, Jr., Poppy, Jessie Murph, and Q Marsden among others.

== Discography ==
Year	Artist	Song	Album
2026	Goldie Boutilier	"Infinite Love"	Single
2026	Lennon Stella	"Unforgivable Things" "Comedy Show" "Beginner's Mind" "I Still Want You" "Ta Da" "What's There To Hold Onto" "Peach" "If She'll Let Me" "Smartest Person in the Room" "Too Quiet, Too Loud" "Whatever That Means"	Sleeping Lion
2026	Q	"silly boy" "i wish you were here" "hey there [i have a compulsive complex]" "drive me off the wall (feat. Deb Never)" "keep your clothes on" "i built a brick patio" "2 things (feat. Marco Mckinnis)"	DO YOU SEE ME?
2026	Goldie Boutilier	"How To Be A Lover"	Single
2026	Suki Waterhouse	"18" "Happy With It"	Loveland
2026	Grace Enger	"Track 7"	Satisfied Girl
2026	Paul Cauthen	"Road Dog"	Book of Paul
2026	Goldie Boutilier	"Party"	Single
2026	Jisoo	"Click"	TBA
	Royal and the Serpent	"Pulling Teeth"	Emptiness Is Godly
2025	5 Seconds of Summer	"Telephone Busy", "Boyband", "I'll Find You"	EVERYONE'S A STAR
2025	Three Days Grace	"Apologies", "Dominate", "Kill Me Fast", "In Waves", "Alienation", "Don't Wanna Go Home Tonight", "In Cold Blood", "Another Relapse"	Alienation
2025	Heidi Montag	"Sriracha"	Superficial 2: Heidiwood Edition
2025	Charlotte Lawrence	"Us Three"	Somewhere
2025	Goldie Boutilier	"Neon Nuptials", "I Can't", "Goldie Montana", "Terrible Things", "At the End of the War", "I Am the Rich Man"	Goldie Boutilier Presents...Goldie Montana
2024	Jess Glynne	"Love Me"	JESS
2024	Royal & the Serpent	"Wasteland"	Arcane League of Legends Soundtrack
2024	Robert Grace	"Reasons"	Single
2024	Goldie Boutilier	"The Actress", "The Angel and The Saint", "The Lineup", "The Ways I Punish Myself", "The Rhinestone Ceiling", The Last Dance"	The Actress EP
2024	Royal & the Serpent	"American Spirit"	RAT TRAP 5: The Beginning
2024	Enrique Iglesias & Miranda Lambert	"Space In My Heart"	Single
2023	Yoandri	"HOLY WATER"	Single
2023	Poppy	"Church Outfit", "Knockoff", "Hard", "Motorbike"	Zig
2023	Claire Rosinkranz	"Swinging at the Stars"	Just Because
2023	Jess Glynne	"What Do You Do?"	JESS
2023	Idina Menzel	"Beast"	Drama Queen
2023	Natalie Jane & Charlieonnadfriday	"I'm Good"	Single
2023	Albert Hammond Jr	Full Album	Melodies On Hiatus
2023	The Used	"Dancing With A Brick Wall," "Headspace," and "Cherry"	Toxic Positivity
2023	Stacey Ryan	"Somebody Good"	I Don't Know What Love Is
2023	no good	"Tune Out"	Single
2022	Nessa Barrett	"Dear God"	Young Forever
2022	Carly Rae Jepsen	"Talking to Yourself"	The Loneliest Time
2022	carolesdaughter	"Sunshine and Roses"	Single
2022	Aidan Bissett	"Twenty Something"	Single
2022	Madeon	"Love You Back"	Single
2022	Caitlyn Smith	"Downtown Baby"	Single
2022	Royal & the Serpent	"THAT SUX"	IF I DIED WOULD ANYONE CARE
2022	Lilyisthatyou	"Purity"	Single
2022	Lennon Stella	"Fancy", "Bubble"	Single
2022	Poppy	"FYB"	Stagger
2022	Poppy	"Shapes"	Stagger
2022	Aidan Bissett	"Twenty Something"	Single
2022	Caitlyn Smith	"Downtown Baby"	Single
2022	Madeon	“Love You Back”	Single
2022	Lyn Lapid	"Pager"	The Outsider EP
2022	Enrique Iglesias	"Espacio en tu Corazón	Single
2022	Lilyisthatyou	"ALL ABOUT ME"	Single
2022	Royal & the Serpent	"THAT SUX"	IF I DIED WOULD ANYONE CARE
2022	Lilyisthatyou	"Purity"	Single
2022	Jonah Kagen	"Turbulence"	Single
2022	DES3ETT & Serena Ryder	"Killing The Pain"	Single
2022	SIX60	"Before You Leave"	Single
2021	Thomas Day	"The New Me"	Single
2021	Lennon Stella	"Fancy", "Bubble"	Single
2021	Scott Helman	"Pretty"	Single
2021	Poppy	"Flux"	Flux
2021	Loren Gray	"Piece Of Work"	Single
2021	Poppy	"Breeders"	Eat (NXT Soundtrack)
2021	Breagh Isabel	"Girlfriends"	Single
2021	Demi Lovato	"Easy" (with Noah Cyrus)	Dancing With The Devil... the Art of Starting Over
2021	Scott Helman	"Good Problems"	Single
2021	Scott Helman	"Good Problems - Remix"	Single
2021	Jessie Murph	"Upgrade"	Single
2020	Emily Vu	"Self Love"	Single
2020	Sofia Carson	"Guess I'm a Liar"	Single
2020	Serena Ryder	"Waterfall"	Single
2020	Serena Ryder	"Candy" (feat. Adria Kain)	Single
2020	Serena Ryder	"Candy"	Single
2020	Lennon Stella feat. Charlie Puth	"Summer Feelings"	SCOOB! The Album
2020	The Used	"Cathedral Bell", "Clean Cut Heals"	Heartwork
2020	Lennon Stella	"Bend Over Backwards", "Pretty Boy", "Much Too Much", "Since I Was a Kid", "Golf on TV", "Kissing Other People"	Three. Two. One.
2020	Ria Mae	"For Your Love"	Single
2020	Selena Gomez	"Crowded Room" (featuring 6lack)	Rare
2020	The Washboard Union	"If She Only Knew"	Everbound
2020	Lennon Stella feat. JP Saxe	"Golf on TV"	Single
2020	MILCK	"If I Ruled the World", "Ready", "Gold", "Slow Fade"	Into Gold EP
2020	Scott Helman	"Wait No More", "Lois", "Good Problems", "Evergreen", "Everything Sucks", "True Crime", "Papa"	Nonsuch Park (sa)
2020	Allie X	"Madame X"	Cape God
2020	James Newman	"Enough"	Single
2020	Poppy	"I Won't Be Home for Christmas"	A Very Poppy Christmas
2020	Poppy	"I Like Presents"	A Very Poppy Christmas
2020	Poppy	"Kiss In The Snow"	A Very Poppy Christmas
2019	Liam Payne	"Weekend"	LP1
2019	Echosmith	"Shut Up and Kiss Me"	Single
2019	Lennon Stella	"Kissing Other People"	Single
2019	Sabrina Claudio	"Problem With You"	Truth Is
2019	Madison Kozak	"Household"	Single
2019	Scott Helman	"Everything Sucks", "Evergreen"	Single
2019	Poppy	"Meat"	Choke
2019	The Fever 333	"One of Us", "Inglewood/3", "Coup D’Étalk"	Strength in Numb333rs
2019	Hunter Hayes	"Heartbreak"	Visualizer
2019	Rita Ora	"Soul Survivor"	Phoenix (Deluxe)
2018	Scott Helman	"Hang Ups", "Dostoevsky"	"Hang Ups EP"
2018	Serena Ryder	"Christmas Kisses"	"Christmas Kisses"
2018	Poppy	"Iconic", "Aristocrat", "Girls in Bikinis", "The Rapture Ball", "Am I a Girl", "Chic Chick", "Hard Feelings"	Am I a Girl?
2018	Steve Aoki feat Nicky Romero and Kiiara	"Be Somebody"	Neon Future III
2018	Poppy feat. Diplo	"Time Is Up"	Am I a Girl?
2018	Matoma feat. Enrique Iglesias	"I Don't Dance (Without You)"	One in a Million
2018	Poppy	"In a Minute"	Am I a Girl?
2018	Camila Cabello	"In the Dark"	Camila
2018	Allie X	"Little Things", "Girl of the Year"	Super Sunset
2017	Poppy	"Interweb", "Bleach Blonde Baby", "My Style (feat. Charlotte)", "Software Upgrade", "Pop Music"	Poppy.Computer
2017	Capital Cities	"Drop Everything"	Solarize
2017	Blink-182	"Bottom of the Ocean"	California (Deluxe Edition)
2017	One Ok Rock	"I Was King," "American Girls"	Ambitions
2017	Scott Helman	"21 Days", "Ripple Effect", "PDA", "Sweet Tooth", "Chinese Restaurant", "You Made Her", "Origami", "House Key", "Gaslight"	Hôtel de Ville
2017	Serena Ryder	"Utopia," "Ice Age", "Hands", "Wolves", "Fire Escape"	Utopia
2017	Tinashe	"Flame"	Joyride
2017	Demi Lovato	"Ready for Ya"	Tell Me You Love Me
2017	Nick Jonas	"Find You"	Single
2016	Britney Spears	"If I'm Dancing"	Glory
2016	Demi Lovato	"Body Say"	(Buzz single)
2016	Nick Jonas	"Chainsaw," "Don't Make Me Choose"	Last Year Was Complicated
2016	DNCE	"Almost," "Unsweet"	DNCE
2016	Andy Black	"Ribcage"	The Shadow Side
2016	Cider Sky	All songs	12/4/12 project
2016	Enrique Iglesias	"Duele el Corazón" (English version)	--
2016	Fifth Harmony	"Write On Me", "Squeeze"	7/27
2016	Kevin Hart	"Sunday Morning"	Kevin Hart: What Now? (The Mixtape Presents Chocolate Droppa)
2015	Five Seconds of Summer	"Vapor," "Outer Space/Carry On"	Sounds Good Feels Good
2015	Beautiful Bodies	"Capture and Release"	Battles
2015	Sleeping with Sirens	"The Strays," "Go Go Go," "Save Me a Spark," "Madness"	Madness
2015	Dresses	"Catch"	Let Down
2015	That Poppy	"Lowlife, "Altar," "Money"	Bubblebath (EP)
2014	Nick Jonas	"Jealous," "Area Code" (X2 album edition)	Nick Jonas
2014	Scott Helman	"Bungalow," "That Sweater," "Machine", "Tikka"	Augusta EP
2014	Versa	"Neon"	Neon (EP)
2013	Anarbor	"Take My Pain Away, Before The World Ends, It's a Fact"	Burnout
2013	Goldhouse	"Feelgood"	Back to Life
2013	Josh Groban	"Below the Line"	All That Echoes
2013	Josh Groban	"Your Hideaway"	(Digital single)
2013	Petula Clark	"Next to You"	Lost in You
2013	Walk off the Earth	"Speeches," "Summer Vibe," "Shake," "R.E.V.O."	R.E.V.O.
2012	Ariane Moffatt	"In Your Body," "Too Late"	MA
2012	Cider Sky	"Fall," "We Are in Love"	--
2012	Goldhouse	"F-C-K," "The Moment"	All Night Long EP
2012	The Ready Set	"Give Me Your Hand (Best Song Ever)"	The Bad & The Better
2012	VersaEmerge	"No Consequences"	Another Atmosphere Preview
2011	Breathe Carolina	"Blackout"	Hell Is What You Make It
2011	Cider Sky	"Northern Lights"	The Twilight Saga: Breaking Dawn – Part 1 (soundtrack)
2011	Cider Sky	All songs	King EP
2011	Javier Colon	"Life is Getting Better"	Come Through For You
2011	Lindi Ortega	"Black Fly"	Little Red Boots
2011	The Midway State	"Hartley Salter's Kite"	Paris or India
2010	AJ McLean	"Teenage Wildlife"	Have it All
2010	Jessica Lowndes	"Girl Tax," "Haven't Been Drinking"	Nothing Like This
2010	Valencia	"Somewhere I Belong"	Dancing with a Ghost
2009	Breathe Carolina	"Hello Fascination," "I.D.G.A.F."	Hello Fascination
2009	The Higher	"It's Only Natural"	It's Only Natural
2009	Jeffree Star	"Fresh Meat," "Get Physical," "Bitch, Please!"	Beauty Killer
2009	Ten Second Epic	"Welcome to Wherever You Are"	Hometown
2009	Theo Tams	"Wait For You"	Give It All Away
2008	Ali Slaight	"Story of Your Life," "Great Expectations," "Apple of My Eye"	Trace the Stars EP
2008	Beast	"Mr. Hurricane", "Devil", "Satan", "Ashtray", "Microcyte", "Fingerprints", "Out of Control"	Beast
2008	Jorane	"Stay"	Dix
2008	The Kooks	"Young Folks" (vocalist)	NME box set issue
2008	Paris Hilton	"Paris for President"	(Parody song)
2008	The Trews	"Man of Two Minds"	No Time for Later
2008	Theo Tams	"Christmas Dream"	(Single)
2007	Simon Wilcox	All songs	The Charm and the Strange
2007	Social Code	"Bomb Hands"	Social-Code
2003	Three Days Grace	"Home," "Wake Up"	Three Days Grace
1999	Simon Wilcox	All songs	Mongrel of Love
