= Proof You Weren't The Only One =

Studio album by Chandler Leighton
- Released: April 26, 2024
- Genres: pop; alt-rock
- Length: 35:43
- Label: Boom Records

Chandler Leighton chronology
A Letter To My Vices (2022)	Proof You Weren't The Only One (2024)	Coming Up For Air (2025)

Singles from Proof You Weren't The Only One
- 1. "MONSTER"; 2. "Fixer Upper"; 3. "American Dream"; 4. "Half-Life"; 5. "a late apology" 6. "A Letter to Everyone Who's Hurt Me"; 7. "ETA"; 8. "Got What I Wanted"

Proof You Weren't The Only One is the debut album by singer songwriter Chandler Leighton, released in April of 2024. The album details the struggles Leighton faced throughout her childhood and into her music career.

== Background ==
Leighton would release the first single that would be on her eventual debut album starting in January of 2023 with the release of "A Letter To Everyone Who's Hurt Me" along with an associated music video. In March Leighton released her next single, "MONSTER". In May she released "Fixer Upper". In July Leighton released "EXTRA EXTRA". In September Leighton released "American Dream". The last single she released in 2023 was "Half-Life", in November.

2024 saw the release of the final three singles before the album's release with "a late apology" in January, followed by "ETA" in February. In March Leighton released the final single from her upcoming album, "Got What I Wanted" (Note: "Got What I Wanted" is the name of the single, for clarification), along with an accompanying music video. On April 26, 2024, Leighton released the entirety her debut album titled Proof You Weren't The Only One.

== Composition and themes ==
The album has influences of dark alt pop, alt rock, and electro genres, and tells a "somewhat connected" story in its two parts. The first 3 tracks tell an intertwined story, with a mix a pop and rock sounds. The opening track "SICK" features a "lo-fi guitar" intro. The title of the single "A Letter To Everyone Who's Hurt Me" is an allusion to the title of Leighton's debut EP A Letter To My Vices. The song touches on Leightons childhood, growing with parents who always were fighting and eventually got divorced, unlike the other tracks on the album, "A Letter To Everyone Who's Hurt Me" features a piano melody. The track "ETA" discusses Leighton's struggles with depression and struggles in the music industry. The final track, "Got What I Wanted" demonstrates that artists path to success isn't easy and comes with hours of sacrifice.

== Track listing ==
Proof You Weren't the Only One track listing
No.	Title	Writer(s)	Producer	Length
1.	"SICK"	Reed Burin; Katie Cecil; Taylor Fernandez; Chandler Leighton	Burin; Leighton; Brennan Loney	3:00
2.	"MONSTER"	Burin; Leighton; Loney	Leighton; Loney	2:38
3.	"EXTRA EXTRA"	Autumn Buysee; Leighton; Matthew Marino	Leighton; Loney	3:25
4.	"Fixer Upper"	Riley Biederer; Leighton; Erik Ron	Ron	2:50
5.	"American Dream"	Mark Evans; Jack Lafrantz; Meg Lafrantz; Leighton	Evans	3:03
6.	"NO I DON'T"	Berin; Cecil; Leighton	Berin; Loney	3:45
7.	"Half-Life"	Henry Brill; Leighton; Hunter Metts	Metts	3:50
8.	"a late apology"	Leighton	Evans	3:21
9.	"A Letter To Everyone Who's Hurt Me"	Leighton; Loney; Mike Robinson; Jaymes Young	Loney; Young	3:47
10.	"ETA"	Devon Again; Michael Christofi; Leighton	Christofi	2:59
11.	"Got What I Wanted"	Daniel James; Leighton; Loney	James	3:02
Total length:				35:43
