= Everyone's a Star! =

2025 studio album by 5 Seconds of Summer

Studio album by 5 Seconds of Summer
- Released: 14 November 2025
- Recorded: 2022–2025
- Genres: Pop rock; dance-pop; alternative rock; new wave; pop; post-punk revival
- Length: 36:15
- Label: Republic
- Producers: Julian Bunetta; Noah Conrad; Jason Evigan; Andrew Goldstein; John Ryan; Mark Schick; Jake Sinclair

5 Seconds of Summer chronology
The Feeling of Falling Upwards (2023)	Everyone's a Star! (2025)

Singles from Everyone's a Star
- 1. "Not OK" Released: 24 September 2025; 2. "Boyband" Released: 16 October 2025; 3. "Telephone Busy" Released: 23 October 2025; 4. "Everyone's a Star!" Released: 21 November 2025

Everyone's a Star! is the sixth studio album by the Australian pop rock band 5 Seconds of Summer, released on 14 November 2025 as their first record under Republic Records. It was preceded by the singles "Not OK", "Boyband", and "Telephone Busy". The album was released to positive reviews, with critics praising its blend of pop-punk energy with the vulnerability of the band's solo records, and the charm of their past music. In support of the album's release, the band embarked on the Everyone's a Star! World Tour in 2026.

At the 2026 ARIA Music Awards it was nominated for Best Group.

== Background and recording ==
5 Seconds of Summer began working on Everyone's a Star! in Los Angeles and Nashville shortly after releasing their fifth studio album, 5SOS5 in 2022. They followed it with their third live album, The Feeling of Falling Upwards in 2023, and continued works on their sixth record whilst releasing their own solo projects. The band was also performing for their 10th-anniversary world tour, The 5 Seconds of Summer Show, which made them reflect on their beginnings. According to Ashton Irwin and Michael Clifford, they wanted to expand upon "the tongue-in-cheek" tone of their debut album, and "lean further into irony and satire". The album is also widely considered an intentional and mature return to their heavier rock roots with Ashton Irwin stating “ We revisited our production and writing partner, Jake Sinclair. And we said, Jake, we’d love to get back in with you. We’re trying to make more rock again.” In regards to them writing "The Rocks". The band dubbed Everyone's a Star! their "most ambitious era yet". The visuals were described by Clifford as having been strongly influenced by the Y2K aesthetic and 2000s fashion.

== Release and promotion ==
Everyone's a Star! was initially teased through posters around New York City, which linked to the band's "Your Favorite Boy Band" website, where fans could pre-save the album's lead single, "Not OK", which was released on 24 September 2025. The album was announced on the same day, with a release date of 14 November 2025. Also on the same day, the band performed at The Sun Rose in West Hollywood, California, where they debuted four more tracks.

A music video for the lead single "Not OK" was released on 9 October. The second single, "Boyband", was released on 16 October, and the third single, "Telephone Busy", was released on 23 October. On the same day as the release of the third single, the band announced the Everyone's a Star! World Tour, set to begin on 26 March 2026 and ending on 6 November 2026. On the day of the album's release, the band released the music video for "Telephone Busy". On 30 December 2025, a music video for "Everyone's a Star!" was released. The song was supported by Australian radio airplay.

To further promote Everyone'a a Star!, 5 Seconds of Summer made appearances at pop-up events, and performed live in California, London, and Times Square in New York. On 17 and 19 November 2025, they joined the American pop rock band Jonas Brothers as surprise guests on the Jonas20: Greetings from Your Hometown Tour to perform their own mini-set. On 19 November 2025, the band also gave a televised performance of the album's title track on The Today Show.

== Critical reception ==
Professional ratings
Aggregate scores
Source	Rating
Metacritic	77/100
Review scores
Source	Rating
AllMusic	4/5 stars
Clash	8/10
Kerrang!	4/5
Rolling Stone Australia	4/5 stars
The Standard	3/5 stars

On Metacritic, a review aggregator site that compiles reviews from mainstream publications and assigns a weighted average score out of 100, Everyone's a Star! received a score of 77 based on five critic reviews. This score indicated "generally favorable reviews".

Matt Collar of AllMusic concluded that "they look back at their early years with an artful honesty, crafting a post-modern boyband album that's as sonically and thematically ambitious as it is fun." Shannon Garner of Clash added that it "feels like their debut record, but grown up, bolder, and fully in command of its sound." Isabel Cant of Rolling Stone Australia called Everyone's a Star! the band's "most compelling work yet", and wrote that "exploring every corner of the pop-rock genre on [the album] has paid off to create an electric tapestry of sound that keeps you coming back for more."

== Commercial performance ==
Everyone's a Star! debuted atop several charts including the ARIA Charts, Austrian Albums, Dutch Albums, Scottish Albums and the UK Albums. Internationally, the album entered top ten in several countries, including Belgium, Germany, Ireland, New Zealand, Norway, and Poland. The album also entered the top 10 on the Billboard 200, ranking at number six.

== Track listing ==
Everyone's a Star! – Standard edition
No.	Title	Writer(s)	Producer(s)	Length
1.	"Everyone's a Star!"	Ashton Irwin; Calum Hood; John Ryan; Julian Bunetta; Luke Hemmings; Michael Clifford; Sierra Hemmings; Steph Jones	Bunetta^{[p]}; Ryan^{[p]}	3:15
2.	"Not OK"	James Abrahart; Irwin; Hood; Jason Evigan; L. Hemmings; Mark Schick; Sarah Hudson	Evigan^{[p]}; Schick^{[p]}	3:23
3.	"Telephone Busy"	Irwin; Hood; Evigan; Leland; L. Hemmings; Clifford; Simon Wilcox	Evigan^{[p]}; Lewis Pesacov^{[a]}	3:15
4.	"Boyband"	Evigan; Wilcox; Irwin; Hood; Ryan; L. Hemmings	Evigan^{[p]}; Ryan; Pesacov^{[a]}	2:57
5.	"No. 1 Obsession"	Irwin; Hood; Evigan; Abrahart; L. Hemmings; Hudson	Evigan^{[p]}	3:05
6.	"I'm Scared I'll Never Sleep Again"	Hood; Bunetta; L. Hemmings; Jones	Bunetta^{[p]}; Ryan^{[p]}	2:50
7.	"Istillfeelthesame"	Andrew Goldstein; L. Hemmings; Clifford; Nick Long	Goldstein	2:30
8.	"Ghost"	Ryan; Bunetta; L. Hemmings; S. Hemmings; Jones	Bunetta^{[p]}; Ryan^{[p]}	3:46
9.	"Sick of Myself"	Ryan; Bunetta; L. Hemmings; Clifford; Jones	Bunetta^{[p]}; Ryan^{[p]}	2:27
10.	"Evolve"	Irwin; Hood; Evigan; Abrahart; L. Hemmings; Jones	Evigan^{[p]}; Pesacov^{[a]}	3:19
11.	"The Rocks"	Irwin; Jake Sinclair; L. Hemmings; Wilcox	Jake Sinclair; Zak Dossi^{[a]}; John Sinclair^{[a]}	3:19
12.	"Jawbreaker"	Hood; L. Hemmings; Noah Conrad; S. Hemmings	Conrad^{[p]}	2:07
Total length:				36:15

Everyone's a Star! – Fully Evolved edition
No.	Title	Writer(s)	Producer(s)	Length
13.	"Start Over"	Bunetta; Ryan; L. Hemmings; Hood	Bunetta^{[p]}; Ryan^{[p]}	3:07
14.	"Wishful Dreaming"	Clifford; L. Hemmings; Hood; Irwin; Colin Brittain; Elijah Noll	Brittain^{[p]}	2:59
15.	"Chest"	Irwin; Hood; Justin Raisen; Pesacov; Ainjel Emme Lopez	Raisen^{[p]}; Pesacov^{[p]}; Brad Lauchert^{[a]}	3:21
16.	"I'll Find You"	Hood; Clifford; Schick; Bunetta; Evigan; Wilcox; Mikky Ekko	Evigan^{[p]}; Schick^{[p]}	3:31
Total length:				49:15

Everyone's a Star! – Somebody's Father btw Exclusive Digital Album (Cool Dad Edition)
No.	Title	Writer(s)	Producer(s)	Length
17.	"Cool Dad"	Bunetta; Ryan; Jones; L. Hemmings; Clifford	Bunetta^{[p]}; Ryan^{[p]}	1:54
Total length:				51:27

=== Notes ===
- ^{^[p]} indicates a primary and vocal producer
- ^{^[a]} indicates an additional producer
- "Not OK" is stylized in all uppercase.
- "Istillfeelthesame" is stylized in all lowercase.

== Personnel ==
Credits adapted from Tidal.

=== 5 Seconds of Summer ===
- Michael Clifford – guitar (tracks 1–4, 6–9), vocals (2, 7), background vocals (2, 9, 10)
- Luke Hemmings – vocals (all tracks), background vocals (1–4, 6, 8, 9, 12), guitar (1, 2, 5–7, 9, 10), keyboards (4, 5, 7, 12), programming (7)
- Calum Hood – bass (1–10, 12), background vocals (1–6, 8, 9, 11, 12), vocals (3, 4, 6, 10), keyboards (4, 7, 10), guitar (5, 10), programming (7)
- Ashton Irwin – drums (1–10, 12), guitar (2–5, 10), background vocals (2–5, 11), vocals (2, 3, 10), keyboards (4, 10)

=== Additional musicians ===
- Julian Bunetta – programming (1, 6, 8, 9), keyboards (1, 6, 8), drums (1, 6)
- John Ryan – guitar, programming (1, 6, 8, 9); keyboards (1)
- Jason Evigan – guitar (2–5, 10), keyboards (2, 4, 5), background vocals (2, 3, 5, 10), drum programming (2, 4), programming (3, 5, 10), bass (3, 10), synthesizer (3)
- JHart – background vocals (2, 5, 10)
- Sarah Hudson – background vocals (2, 5, 10)
- Mark Schick – background vocals, bass, drum programming, keyboards (2)
- Simon Wilcox – background vocals (3)
- Sierra Hemmings – background vocals (6, 12)
- Andrew Goldstein – background vocals, guitar, keyboards, programming (7)
- Jake Sinclair – background vocals (11)
- Justin Sinclair – background vocals (11)
- Zak Dossi – background vocals (11)
- Noah Conrad – background vocals, guitar, keyboards, programming (12)

=== Technical ===
- Jeff Gunnell – engineering (1, 4, 6, 8, 9)
- John Ryan – engineering (1, 6, 8, 9)
- Julian Bunetta – engineering (1, 6, 8, 9)
- Jackson Rau – engineering (2–5, 10)
- Jason Evigan – engineering (2–5, 10)
- Mark Schick – engineering (2)
- Brad Lauchert – engineering (4, 6, 8)
- Lewis Pesacov – engineering (6, 8, 10), additional engineering (2)
- Justin Sinclair – engineering (11)
- Nicole Schmidt – engineering (11)
- Noah Conrad – engineering (12)
- Serban Ghenea – mixing (1–4, 10)
- Alex Ghenea – mixing (5–9)
- John Sinclair – mixing (11)
- Lars Stalfors – mixing (12)
- Harrison Tate – mastering (1–4, 6, 8–12)
- Nathan Dantzler – mastering (1–4, 6, 8–12)
- Joe LaPorta – mastering (5, 7)
- Boston Bodvig – additional engineering (2–4, 6, 8, 10)
- Coleman Reichenbach – additional engineering (2–4, 6, 8, 10)
- Evelyn Faivre – additional engineering (2–4, 6, 8, 10)
- Sam Roberts – additional engineering (2–4, 6, 8, 10)
- Bryce Bordone – additional mixing (1–4, 10)
- Brendan Civale – production coordination (1, 6, 8, 9)
- Damon Bunetta – production coordination (1, 6, 8, 9)

== Charts ==
Chart performance for Everyone's a Star!
Chart (2025)	Peak position
Australian Albums (ARIA)	1
Austrian Albums (Ö3 Austria)	1
Belgian Albums (Ultratop Flanders)	4
Belgian Albums (Ultratop Wallonia)	10
Canadian Albums (Billboard)	93
Dutch Albums (Album Top 100)	1
French Albums (SNEP)	45
German Albums (Offizielle Top 100)	5
German Pop Albums (Offizielle Top 100)	3
Hungarian Albums (MAHASZ)	38
Irish Albums (Official Charts)	8
Italian Albums (FIMI)	32
New Zealand Albums (RMNZ)	5
Norwegian Physical Albums (IFPI Norge)	4
Polish Albums (ZPAV)	5
Portuguese Albums (AFP)	33
Scottish Albums (Official Charts)	1
Swedish Albums (Sverigetopplistan)	55
Swiss Albums (Schweizer Hitparade)	34
UK Albums (Official Charts)	1
US Billboard 200	6

=== Year-end charts ===
Year-end chart performance for Everyone's a Star!
Chart (2025)	Position
Australian Artist Albums (ARIA)	7
