= Not OK (5 Seconds of Summer song) =

Single by 5 Seconds of Summer

from the album Everyone's a Star!
- Released: 24 September 2025
- Length: 3:23
- Label: Republic
- Songwriters: Luke Hemmings; Calum Hood; Ashton Irwin; JHart; Sarah Hudson; Jason Evigan; Mark Schick
- Producers: Jason Evigan; Mark Schick

5 Seconds of Summer singles chronology
"Lighter" (2024)	"Not OK" (2025)	"Boyband" (2025)

Music video
- "Not OK" on YouTube

"Not OK" (stylised in all caps) is a song by the Australian pop rock band 5 Seconds of Summer. It was released on 24 September 2025 independently in partnership with Republic Records, as the lead single from their sixth studio album, Everyone's a Star! (2025).

== Background ==
In September 2025, cryptic posts began popping up with a message "Your Favorite Boy Band Is Coming Back," which was revealed to be from 5 Seconds of Summer. They soon announced a new album titled Everyone's a Star and released "Not OK" as the lead single on 24 September. It is their first release under Republic Records. On 9 October, the band released a music video for the song. Drummer Ashton Irwin spoke about the song in an interview with Rolling Stone, stating, "We can kill our depression together, and we can experience these elevated feelings together. You want people feeling free. When you hit rock bottom, you need a best friend to shake off the pessimism."

== Composition ==
Written by Luke Hemmings, Calum Hood, Ashton Irwin, JHart, Sarah Hudson, Jason Evigan and Mark Schick, Hemmings described the lyrics as "darker" and was a "nod" to the band itself. It was produced by Jason Evigan and Mark Schick. Musically, it features "hyper-charged beats, cymbals accent, a buoyant bassline, and a hummable guitar solo," with its sound inspired by The Prodigy and N.E.R.D..

Speaking to Official Charts Company in November 2025, Ashton Irwin said "Jason Evigan had a drum loop and I was like; 'this is pretty hot'. 'Not OK' stood out instantly when we'd finished it. We were looking for something which was nasty up-tempo rock. It just so happens Jason is extremely good with synthesizers as well. So that sonic sound revealed itself after we'd all tracked on it and it ended up being our lead single."

== Personnel ==
Credits for "Not OK" adapted from digital liner notes.

5 Seconds of Summer

- Luke Hemmings – vocals, rhythm guitar
- Calum Hood – vocals, bass guitar
- Michael Clifford – vocals, lead guitar
- Ashton Irwin – vocals, drums, additional guitar

Additional musicians

- Jason Evigan – background vocals, guitar, keyboards, drum programming
- Mark Schnick – background vocals, bass guitar, drum programming, keyboards
- Sarah Hudson – background vocals
- JHart – background vocals

Production

- Jason Evigan – producer, vocal producer, engineer
- Mark Schick – producer, vocal producer, engineer
- Serban Ghenea – mixing
- Jackson Rau – engineer
- Lewis Pesacov – additional engineer
- Sam Roberts – additional engineer
- Coleman Reichenbach – additional engineer
- Boston Bodvig – additional engineer
- Evelyn Faivre – additional engineer
- Bryce Bordone – assist mixing
- Nathan Dantzler – mastering
- Harrison Tate – mastering

== Charts ==
Chart performance for "Not OK"
Chart (2025)	Peak position
Australian Artist Singles (ARIA)	9
Estonia Airplay (Tophit)	110
New Zealand Hot Singles (RMNZ)	12
