= Nathan Dantzler =

American mastering engineer

- Born: U.S.
- Occupations: Mastering engineer; producer
- Years active: 2001–present
- Notable work: Espresso, Short n' Sweet
- Awards: Grammy Award (2004)

Nathan Dantzler is an American mastering engineer. He is a Grammy Award-winning mastering engineer with one win and four nominations.

== Career ==
Dantzler is the founder of The Hit Lab, a mastering studio in Nashville, Tennessee. His mastering credits include works for artists such as Sabrina Carpenter, Teddy Swims, Alex Warren, Demi Lovato, Madison Beer, 5 Seconds of Summer, Thomas Rhett, Kim Petras, Niall Horan, Megan Moroney, Marina Diamandis, Ty Myers, and Hilary Duff.

== Selected discography ==
Year	Album/song	Artist	Credit
2017	"Slow Hands"	Niall Horan	Mastering engineer
2022	"Tennessee Orange"	Megan Moroney	Mastering engineer
2022	"If You Go Down (I'm Goin' Down Too)"	Kelsea Ballerini	Mastering engineer
2023	"Lose Control"	Teddy Swims	Mastering engineer
2024	"Espresso"	Sabrina Carpenter	Mastering engineer
2024	"Somethin' 'Bout a Woman"	Thomas Rhett	Mastering engineer
2024	"do i ever cross your mind"	Sombr	Mastering engineer
2024	"Am I Okay?"	Megan Moroney	Mastering engineer
2024	"Taste"	Sabrina Carpenter	Mastering engineer
2024	"The Door"	Teddy Swims	Mastering engineer
2025	"Tears"	Sabrina Carpenter	Mastering engineer
2025	"Leave Me Alone"	Reneé Rapp	Mastering engineer
2025	"Eternity"	Alex Warren	Mastering engineer
2025	"Not OK"	5 Seconds of Summer	Mastering engineer
2025	"Die on This Hill"	Sienna Spiro	Mastering engineer
2025	"Yes Baby"	Madison Beer	Mastering engineer
2025	"No Time to Talk"	Jonas Brothers	Mastering engineer
2025	"Fast"	Demi Lovato	Mastering engineer
2025	"Everyone's a Star!"	5 Seconds of Summer	Mastering engineer
2026	"Leak It"	Flo	Mastering engineer

== Awards and nominations ==
Grammy Awards

Year	Nominated work	Category	Result
2004	Worldwide	Best Rock Gospel Album	Won
2025	Espresso	Record of the Year	Nominated
2025	Short n' Sweet	Best Engineered Album, Non-Classical	Nominated
2025	Short n' Sweet	Album of the Year	Nominated
2026	Man's Best Friend	Album of the Year	Nominated
