= Order Chaos Order =

Studio album by Calum Hood
- Released: 13 June 2025
- Length: 38:37
- Label: Calum Hood; EMI; Universal Australia
- Producer: David Burris; Day Wave; TMS

Singles from Order Chaos Order
- 1. "Don't Forget You Love Me" Released: 11 April 2025; 2. "Call Me When You Know Better" Released: 9 May 2025; 3. "Sunsetter" Released: 13 June 2025

Order Chaos Order (stylised as ORDER chaos ORDER) is the debut studio album by Australian musician Calum Hood. It was announced on 11 April 2025 alongside the album's lead single and released on 13 June 2025. Two singles were released in anticipation of the album: "Don't Forget You Love Me" and "Call Me When You Know Better". The album debuted at number 1 on the ARIA Albums Chart.

== Singles ==
The album's lead single, "Don't Forget You Love Me", was released via EMI Music Australia on 10 April 2025. "Call Me When You Know Better" was released on 8 May 2025 as the second single from the album. The third single, "Sunsetter", was released coincide the album on 13 June 2025.

== Critical reception ==
Professional ratings
Review scores
Source	Rating
Rolling Stone Australia	3.5/5 stars
Kerrang!	4/5 stars
AllMusic	4/5 stars
Clash	8/10

Neil Griffiths from Rolling Stone Australia said the album was "worth the wait" saying "The 5 Seconds of Summer member breaks out on his own for a diverse debut solo LP exploring indie-pop, new wave, and more."

Emma Wilkes from Kerrang! said of the album "While you certainly come away from Order Chaos Order having become much more well acquainted with his inner world, more significantly, it's thrown light on just how much Calum is capable of".

Shannon Garner of Clash also reviewed the album positively, saying, "Overall, Order Chaos Order is a bold genre-melding statement that affirms Hood's role beyond solo artistry. It's a record that proves Hood isn't just capable of standing on his own, but of shaping a soundscape that feels deeply personal, and definitely vulnerable".

A review published on AllMusic stated "Order Chaos Order never comes off as overly derivative, and Hood manages to grab you with a style and emotional pathos that feel genuine. The result is an album that shimmers with a dreamy, golden-hour energy that sticks with you".

Order Chaos Order ranked 17th in a list of the 50 best Australian Albums of 2025 by Rolling Stone Australia.

== Track listing ==
Order Chaos Order track listing
No.	Title	Writer(s)	Producer(s)	Length
1.	"Don't Forget You Love Me"	Calum Hood; Tom Barnes; Peter Kelleher; Bek Kohn; Jack LaFrantz	TMS	3:27
2.	"Call Me When You Know Better"	Hood; Jackson Phillips	Day Wave	3:40
3.	"Sweetdreams"	Hood; Phillips	Day Wave	3:56
4.	"I Wanted to Stay"	Hood; Phillips	Day Wave	3:42
5.	"Sunsetter"	Hood; David Burris	Burris	3:59
6.	"All My Affection"	Hood; Burris	Burris	4:31
7.	"Endless Ways"	Hood; Elijah Noll; Phillips	Day Wave	4:05
8.	"Streetwise"	Hood; Noll; Phillips	Day Wave	3:41
9.	"Dark Circles"	Hood; Phillips	Day Wave	2:58
10.	"Three of Swords"	Hood; Phillips	Day Wave	4:26
Total length:				38:37

== Personnel ==
Credits adapted from Tidal.

- Calum Hood – vocals, bass (all tracks); background vocals (tracks 1–4, 7–10), programming (2–4, 7–10), keyboards (7)
- Michael Freeman – mixing
- Joe LaPorta – mastering
- Adam Christgau – drums (all tracks), guitar (5, 6)
- Peter Kelleher – background vocals, keyboards (1)
- Ben Kohn – background vocals, percussion (1)
- Tom Barnes – background vocals, synthesizer (1)
- Jack LaFrantz – background vocals (1)
- Connor Riddell – guitar (1)
- Jackson Phillips – background vocals, guitar, keyboards, programming, engineering, vocal production (2–4, 7–10)
- David Burris – guitar, keyboards, programming, engineering, vocal production (5, 6)
- Justin Gariano – additional mixing (1)

== Charts ==
Weekly chart performance for Order Chaos Order
Chart (2025)	Peak position
Australian Albums (ARIA)	1
Belgian Albums (Ultratop Flanders)	28
Belgian Albums (Ultratop Wallonia)	134
Dutch Albums (Album Top 100)	24
German Albums (Offizielle Top 100)	20
Polish Albums (ZPAV)	20
Scottish Albums (OCC)	7
UK Albums (OCC)	54
US Billboard 200	179

Year-end chart performance for Order Chaos Order
Chart (2025)	Position
Australian Artist Albums (ARIA)	43

== See also ==
- List of number-one albums of 2025 (Australia)
