= Haiden Henderson =

American singer-songwriter

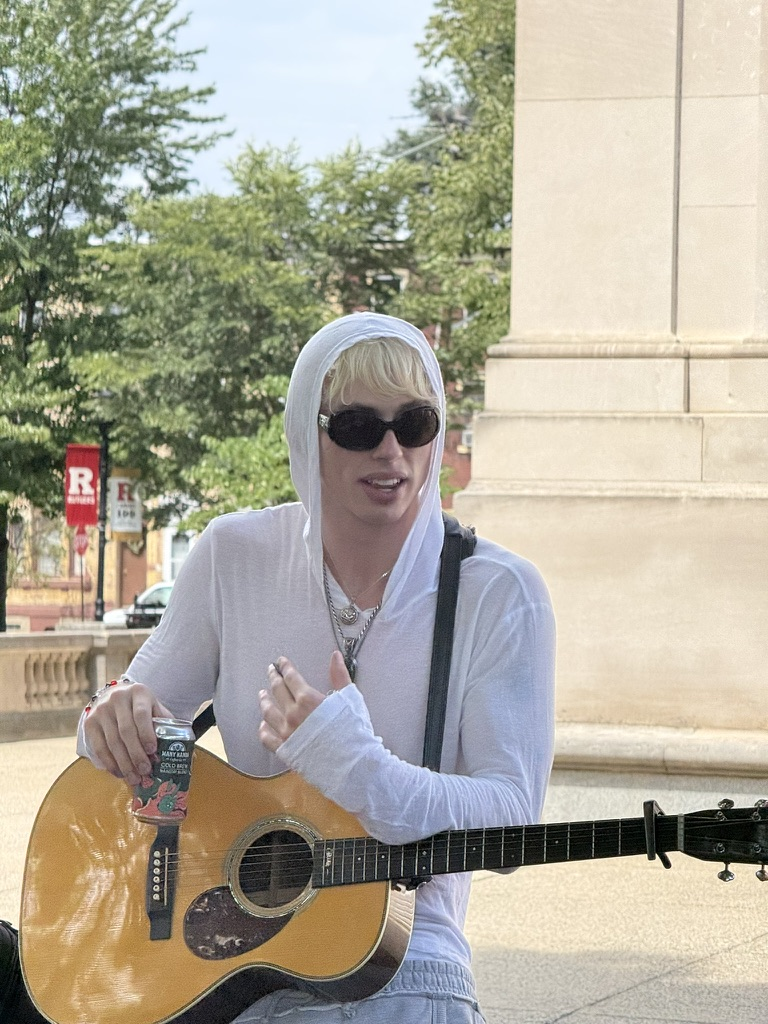
- Henderson performing in Camden, New Jersey

Background information
- Born: Haiden Henderson; May 31, 2001 (age 25); Hanford, California, U.S.
- Origin: Los Angeles, California, U.S.
- Genres: Pop punk; alternative pop; pop rock
- Occupations: Singer; songwriter
- Instruments: Vocals; guitar
- Years active: 2021–present
- Labels: LAVA; Republic
- Website: www.haidenhenderson.com

Haiden Henderson (born May 31, 2001), is an American singer-songwriter and musician based in Los Angeles.

== Early life ==
Henderson was born and raised in Hanford, California by a single mother and moved frequently during his childhood. He taught himself guitar in middle school before setting it aside and did not return to music seriously until college.

Henderson initially enrolled to study aerospace engineering and interned at SpaceX before transferring to the USC Thornton School of Music. During his first year in Los Angeles, he lived out of his car while saving money and developing his songwriting. A childhood hand condition returned when he began playing guitar for extended hours, temporarily stopping him from playing. He shifted his focus to songwriting as a result.

== Career ==
Henderson released his debut single "Unless" in 2021. The following year, an acoustic clip of "Can't Hurt Me" accumulated nearly 10 million views online, and "Sorry to Your Next Ex" reached 20 million global streams, propelling his debut EP Good Grief! past 50 million global streams. In 2023, he released his sophomore EP Choke on My Heart, which included the singles "Fresh Blood" and "Pretty Little Addict", and signed with LAVA/Republic Records.

In 2024, Henderson released the lover boy EP, which included "hell of a good time" and surpassed 25 million streams. He also headlined his first sold-out shows in Los Angeles and New York City. In August 2024, Henderson joined Chandler Leighton on her Sick Tour. In September 2024, he released the single "Sweat".

In August 2025, Henderson released the EP tension, followed in November by the deluxe edition tension (heightened). The deluxe edition included "Parasite", a collaborative single with MICO that the two co-wrote after Henderson reached out upon hearing an early clip of the track. He also completed his first sold-out European headline tour in support of the EP. By this point, Henderson had accumulated over 100 million total streams.

In March 2026, Erazer Magazine interviewed Henderson ahead of his role as a supporting act for the United Kingdom leg of 5 Seconds of Summer's Everyone's a Star! World Tour. Henderson served as an opener alongside South Arcade and Master Peace for the British and European dates of the arena tour, which commenced in late March 2026.

== Musical style and influences ==
Henderson's music blends indie pop, pop rock, and alternative pop. He has cited Daniel Caesar, Sam Fender, and John Mayer as songwriting influences, and FINNEAS and Justin Timberlake as more recent inspirations, alongside classic performers such as Bing Crosby and Louis Armstrong. He has also described David Bowie as an artistic ideal.

== Discography ==
Studio albums
| Title | Year |
|---|---|
| Bleach | 2026 |

Extended plays
| Title | Year |
|---|---|
| Good Grief! | 2022 |
| Choke on My Heart | 2024 |
| lover boy | 2024 |
| tension | 2025 |
| tension (heightened) | 2025 |

Singles
| Title | Year |
|---|---|
| "Unless" | 2021 |
| "Harmony" | 2021 |
| "Can't Hurt Me" | 2022 |
| "Sorry to Your Next Ex" | 2022 |
| "Fresh Blood" | 2023 |
| "Pretty Little Addict" | 2023 |
| "hell of a good time" | 2024 |
| "Sweat" | 2024 |
| "Parasite" (with MICO) | 2025 |
| "Freak for You" | 2026 |
| "NSFW" | 2026 |
| "I Wanna Be Your Girl" | 2026 |
