= Lilyisthatyou =

Canadian pop musician

- Lilyisthatyou in 2024

Background information
- Also known as: Lilyisthatyou
- Born: Lillian Phyllis Davies; September 17, 2000 (age 26); Toronto, Canada
- Origin: Toronto, Canada
- Genres: Pop; Alt pop
- Occupations: Singer; songwriter
- Years active: 2021-present
- Label: Warner Records
- Website: Lilyisthatyou!

Lillian Davies (born September 17, 2000), known professionally as Lilyisthatyou is a singer songwriter from Toronto, Canada. She best known for her breakthrough debut single "FMRN" in 2022, which went viral on TikTok. She released her debut EP, The Character in 2022 and has since went on to release 5 more EPs with From The Garden I Grew being her most recent release as of August 2026.

== Career ==
=== 2021 - 2023: The Character and Pop Music ===
In July 2021 Lily released her debut single, "FMRN" or "Fuck Me Right Now." The song went viral on the social media platform TikTok, garnering millions of views in just 24 hours, despite the success on TikTok, the platform took the video down multiple times for violating platform rules for explicit lyrics. In August, Lily released the music video for "FMRN". In December 2022 Lily released her next single "Party 22." Lily career began to take off throughout the year of 2022 releasing various singles throughout the year including "Purity", "Moderation", "All About Me", "Gorgeous Gorgeous Girls" and "Competition," some of which would be a part of her debut EP The Character released in the summer. The song "Moderation" is about Lily struggles with substance abuse while "Purity" describes her body image issues. The last song Lily released in 2022 was "Do I Make you Nervous".

In December 2023, Lily released her second EP, Pop Music featuring, "Relax After Work With a Drink", "Siren", "Dance", "Grinding My Teeth" and "Superstar, which was the only single off of the EP." The EP delves into the complexities of fame from her own firsthand experience.

=== 2024 - 2025: Painful Euphoria and Lilith ===
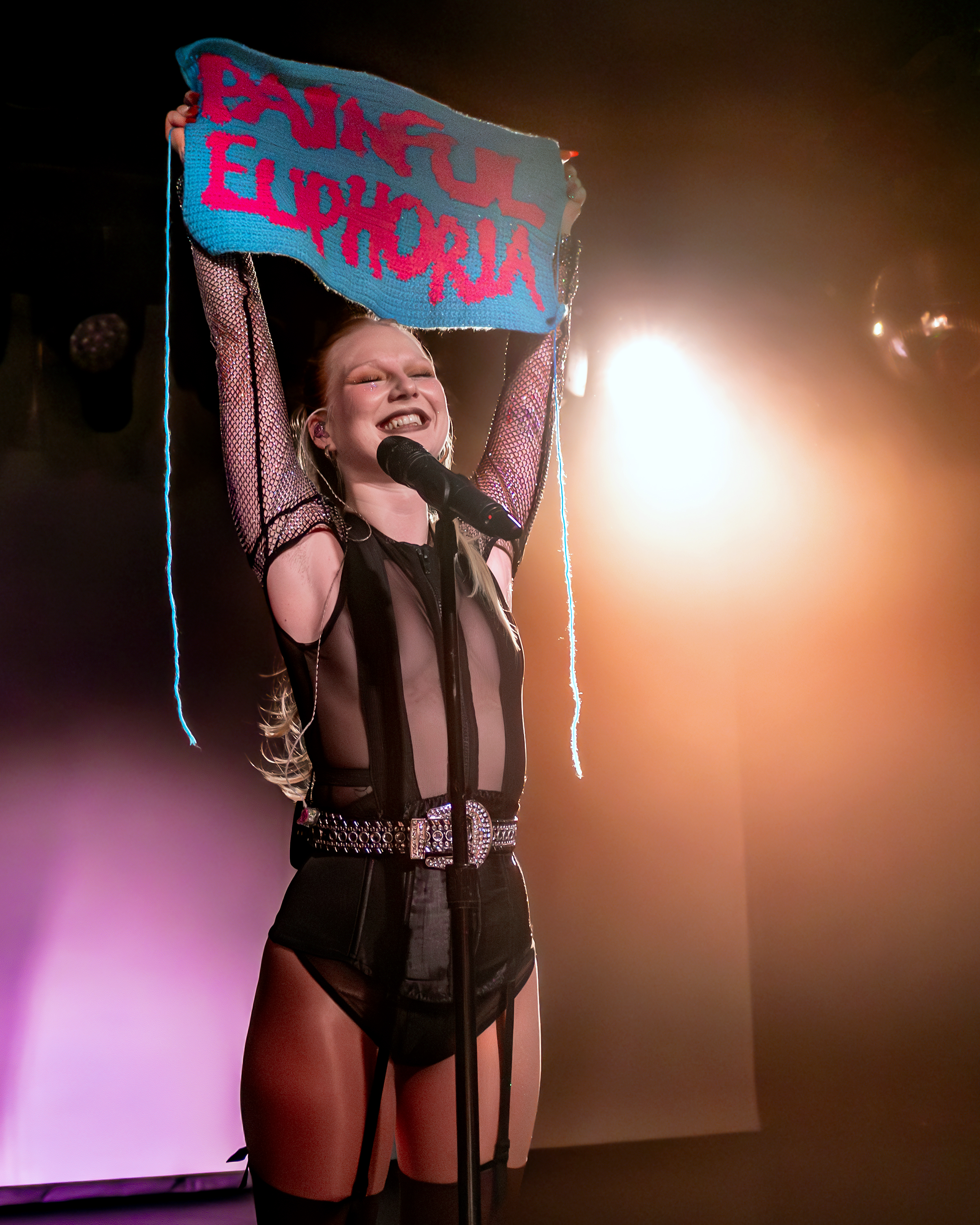
Lilyisthatyou performing during her Painful Euphoria Tour

2024 saw the release of many standalone singles from Lily. Staring with 'Aura" in January. Next, she released "Intimacy Issues" in February. In March Lily released "Anxiety." In April she released 'Dirty Little Fantasy". In May she released "Easy". In June she released "Starring Role". July saw the release of "Hard To Love". In August saw the release of "Halo". In September Lily released the only single off her upcoming EP, titled "Another One Down". In November 2024, Lily would release her third EP, Painful Euphoria. The EP explores Lily's trauma with falling in love with the wrong person and how she was coping with it.

Early in 2025 Lily released a two song single, "Different/Momentum". In July 2025, Lily released "Boys Boys Boys" featuring Bludnymph. In 2025 Lily released her 4th EP, Lilith. None of the songs on this EP were released as singles.

=== 2026 - Present: Dirt On My Hands and From The Garden I Grew ===
In early 2026 Lily released three new singles from her upcoming 5th EP. In January she released "Everything Changes". In February she released "Sick Puppy". In March she released "Back Pain". In April 2026 Lily released her 5th EP, Dirt On My Hands. The song "Sick Puppy" is about self sabotage.

In the summer of 2026 Lily announced her second EP of the year called From The Garden I Grew. In June she released the single, "Empty Universe" and in July she released "Money Can't Buy Happiness". The full EP, From The Garden I Grew, was released in August. Lily worked with producer, Albin Tengblad, on "Money Can't Buy Happiness".

== Artistry ==
The themes of Lily's music are some that many other artists don't talk about in their music. Lily is very open about her struggles with substance abuse in her music and is a common theme throughout her discography. Another common theme in her music is being open about her vulnerability in relationships. She also raises awareness for issues such as climate change in her music. She brings up the topic in her song "Gorgeous Gorgeous Girls". Lily chose the stagename "Lilyisthatyou" after the release of her song "Purity" claiming that she plays many different kinds of characters and wants her listeners to be like "Oh My Gosh, lilyisthatyou?"

Lily cites Frank Ocean,Tove Lo and The Weeknd as influences.

== Discography ==
EPs
Title	Year
The Character	2022
Pop Music	2023
Painful Euphoria	2024
Lilith	2025
Dirt On My Hands	2026
From The Garden I Grew	2026

Singles
Title	Year
FMRN	2021
Party 22	2021
Purity	2022
Moderation	2022
All About Me	2022
Gorgeous Gorgeous Girls	2022
Do I Make You Nervous	2022
Superstar	2023
Intimacy Issues	2024
Anxiety	2024
Dirty Little Fantasy	2024
Easy	2024
Starring Role	2024
Hard To Love	2024
Aura	2024
Halo	2024
Another One Down	2024
Different/Momentum	2025
Boys Boys Boys (featuring Bludnymph)	2025
Everything Changes	2026
Sick Puppy	2026
Back Pain	2026
Empty Universe	2026
Money Can't Buy Happiness	2026
