= Sounds Good Feels Good =

Studio album by 5 Seconds of Summer
- Released: 23 October 2015
- Recorded: 2014–2015
- Genres: Pop-punk; pop rock
- Length: 52:57
- Labels: Capitol; Hi or Hey
- Producers: John Feldmann; The Monsters and the Strangerz; David Hodges; Mike Green

5 Seconds of Summer chronology
| LiveSOS (2014) | Sounds Good Feels Good (2015) | Youngblood (2018) |

Singles from Sounds Good Feels Good
- 1. "She's Kinda Hot" Released: 17 July 2015; 2. "Hey Everybody!" Released: 14 September 2015; 3. "Jet Black Heart" Released: 13 December 2015

Sounds Good Feels Good is the second studio album by Australian pop rock band 5 Seconds of Summer. It was released on 23 October 2015 through the labels Hi or Hey and Capitol Records. In support of the album, the band embarked on the Sounds Live Feels Live World Tour.

Recording sessions took place from 2014 to 2015, in the United States. Record production of the album was handled by John Feldmann, The Monsters and the Strangerz, David Hodges and Mike Green. Recording and writing started after the band became popular worldwide with the release of their debut album, 5 Seconds of Summer, and two of its singles in particular, "She Looks So Perfect" and "Amnesia". At 52 minutes and 57 seconds in length, it is the band’s longest studio album to date. Along with being the band’s longest album, it contains their longest song to date, “Outer Space/Carry On”.

== Background and recording ==
Following the release of their live album LiveSOS in 2014, 5 Seconds of Summer took a break for the holidays. Aside from the track "Invisible", penned in August 2014 at Ocean Way recording studio in Nashville, Tennessee, the majority of Sounds Good Feels Good was written in 2015 in Los Angeles. The band flew to Los Angeles in early 2015 to start writing and recording what was to become their second album.

On their headline tour beginning in early May, they began performing "Permanent Vacation" which was a new song off their album. On 12 August 2015 they announced the title and cover art for the record, with pre-orders starting on 14 August in each time zone. Each pre-order got an instant download of the new tracks "She's Kinda Hot", "Fly Away", "Jet Black Heart", "Money", and "Hey Everybody".

Many songs touch on severe topics like depression and mental health. The band stated that the album was written as a way for them to work through personal issues, and from there they worked to make it an album for their fans, as well. In an interview with Notion magazine, they stated:

With the first album we were 16 years old when we wrote it. But now we’ve been on tour for four and a half years, we’ve experienced stuff. We’ve written about a lot of different things on this album because we’re older and we’ve experienced more of life, so we’ve got more to talk about.

== Artwork ==
The album cover was designed by Richard Andrews, who created the album cover for 5 Seconds of Summer's last two projects – 5 Seconds of Summer and LiveSOS. Annie Zaleski of The A.V. Club described Sounds Good Feels Good's cover as " a clear precedent of the early-’00s pop-punk boom".

== Tour ==
In 2015, 5 Seconds of Summer announced a new tour, which took place in 2016. In order to promote the album, the band embarked on the Sounds Live Feels Live World Tour which visits countries in Asia, Europe, North America and Oceania from February to October 2016. The Sounds Live Feels Live World Tour ranked at #1 on Billboard's 2016 Hot Tours. In total, according to Billboard Boxcore, the tour grossed $39 million from 743,906 sold seats at 102 performances.

== Singles ==
"She's Kinda Hot" was released as the album's lead single on 17 July 2015. It peaked at number six in Australia, number 22 on the US Billboard Hot 100 and number 15 on the US Billboard Mainstream Top 40. It was certified gold by Recording Industry Association of America and Australian Recording Industry Association. The music video for the song was uploaded on YouTube in August 2015. The band followed up the single release with EP releases on 25 August 2015 featuring bonus tracks and physical editions on both CD and vinyl in certain countries.

The album's second single, "Hey Everybody!" was released on 14 September 2015. The single debuted and peaked at number 16 on the US Bubbling Under Hot 100 Singles and number 23 on the US Mainstream Top 40.

The album's third single, "Jet Black Heart" was first released as a promotional single on 28 August 2015, and later, on 16 November 2015, it was announced by the group that "Jet Black Heart" would be released as the album's third single. It was released as a single on 13 December 2015, along with its accompanying music video. It peaked in the top 40 on ARIA Charts and at number 95 on the US Billboard Hot 100.

=== Promotional singles ===
"Fly Away" was released as the first promotional single. It was available to download when the album was made available to pre-order on 13 August 2015. It debuted at number 100 on the US Billboard Hot 100.

"Money" was released as the third promotional single. It was available to download on 17 September 2015.

== Critical reception ==
Professional ratings
Aggregate scores
| Source | Rating |
|---|---|
| AnyDecentMusic? | 5.9/10 |
| Metacritic | 67/100 |
Review scores
| Source | Rating |
| AllMusic | 3/5 stars |
| Alternative Press | 4/5 stars |
| The A.V. Club | B− |
| Billboard | 3/5 stars |
| The Guardian | 3/5 stars |
| Kerrang! | 4/5 |
| NME | 4/10 |
| Rock Sound | 8/10 |
| Rolling Stone | 3/5 stars |
| Spin | 6/10 stars |

The album was generally praised for its maturity compared to the band's debut, but criticized for its lack of cohesiveness and cliche themes. On Metacritic, which assigns a rating out of 100 to reviews from mainstream critics, the album gained an average score of 67 based on 11 reviews, indicating "generally favorable reviews". Awarding the album four stars at Alternative Press, Maria Sherman states, "the band have a real responsibility to the consumer, and Sounds Good Feels Good delivers...It's 5SOS' attempt to find community in their new sound and those who support it, a concept that lives both on the record and well outside of it. It's a strong sentiment: follow them and you might find something to relate to. That's a powerful thing."

The staff from Rock Sound published a review of the album in their October 2015 issue giving the album an eight out of ten rating, where they write, "album number two finds the four man phenomenon firming up their identity and becoming their own band" and closing with the remarks "this is the New Broken Scene, it sounds good and it feels even better". Kerrang! awarded it a 4/5 rating, commenting "Sounds Good Feels Good won't change the world, but it might just change your mind".

=== Accolades ===
Accolades for Sounds Good Feels Good
| Publication | Accolade | Year | Rank | Ref. |
|---|---|---|---|---|
| Rock Sound | Rock Sound's Top 50 Albums of 2015 | 2015 | 31 | |

== Commercial performance ==
The album debuted at number one in the band's home country of Australia, with 16,150 album sales, outselling The X Factor Australia judge Chris Isaak's First Comes the Night by over 10,000 units. It became the band’s second number-one album in their home country.

In the United States, the album debuted at number one on the Billboard 200 with 192,000 album-equivalent units (179,000 in pure album sales). 5 Seconds of Summer became the first band (not vocal group) to have their first two full-length albums debut at number one in the US.

Sounds Good Feels Good is their first UK number one, outselling its nearest rivals by more than two to one. It also debuted at number one in Norway, Ireland, Canada, Italy and the Netherlands.

The album has sold one million copies worldwide as of April 2016. It has been certified Gold in the United Kingdom and Indonesia, and Platinum in Ireland.

== Track listing ==
Sounds Good Feels Good – Standard edition
| No. | Title | Writer(s) | Producer(s) | Length |
|---|---|---|---|---|
| 1. | "Money" | Ashton Irwin; Luke Hemmings; John Feldmann; Joel Madden; Benji Madden | John Feldmann | 2:54 |
| 2. | "She's Kinda Hot" | Irwin; Michael Clifford; Feldmann; J. Madden; B. Madden | Feldmann | 3:36 |
| 3. | "Hey Everybody!" | Calum Hood; Stefan Johnson; Jordan K. Johnson; Marcus Lomax; Clarence Coffee, Jr.; J. Madden; B. Madden; John Taylor; Simon Le Bon; Andy Taylor; Roger Taylor; Nick Rhodes | The Monsters and the Strangerz; Feldmann | 3:16 |
| 4. | "Permanent Vacation" | Hemmings; Clifford; Mike Green; J. Madden; B. Madden | Mike Green | 3:25 |
| 5. | "Jet Black Heart" | Hood; Clifford; David Hodges; Jon Green | David Hodges | 3:41 |
| 6. | "Catch Fire" | Hemmings; Clifford; Green; Alex Gaskarth | Mike Green | 3:27 |
| 7. | "Waste the Night" | Irwin; Hood; Hemmings; Clifford; Feldmann; Jacob Kasher Hindlin | Feldmann | 4:26 |
| 8. | "Vapor" | Irwin; Hood; Hemmings; Clifford; Feldmann; Simon Wilcox | Feldmann | 2:59 |
| 9. | "Castaway" | Hood; Hemmings; S. Johnson; S. Johnson; Lomax; Coffee, Jr.; Sean Maxwell Douglas | The Monsters and the Strangerz; Feldmann | 3:34 |
| 10. | "Fly Away" | Hood; Hemmings; Feldmann | Feldmann | 3:32 |
| 11. | "Invisible" | Irwin; Hood; Clifford; Hemmings; Feldmann; Roy Stride | Feldmann | 3:32 |
| 12. | "Airplanes" | Clifford; Feldmann | Feldmann | 3:38 |
| 13. | "San Francisco" | Hood; Clifford; Feldmann; Bonnie McKee; Sarah Hudson | Feldmann | 4:19 |
| 14. | "Outer Space/Carry On" | Irwin; Hood; Hemmings; Clifford; Feldmann; Wilcox | Feldmann | 6:38 |
| Total length: | | | | 52:57 |

Sounds Good Feels Good – Deluxe edition
| No. | Title | Writer(s) | Producer(s) | Length |
|---|---|---|---|---|
| 7. | "Safety Pin" | Feldmann; Emily Warren | Feldmann | 3:29 |
| 8. | "Waste the Night" | | | 4:26 |
| 9. | "Vapor" | | | 2:59 |
| 10. | "Castaway" | | | 3:34 |
| 11. | "The Girl Who Cried Wolf" | Irwin; Hood; Hemmings; Clifford; Feldmann | Feldmann | 4:22 |
| 12. | "Broken Home" | Hood; Clifford; Hemmings; Feldmann; Benji Madden; Joel Madden | Feldmann | 3:40 |
| 13. | "Fly Away" | | | 3:32 |
| 14. | "Invisible" | | | 3:32 |
| 15. | "Airplanes" | | | 3:38 |
| 16. | "San Francisco" | | | 4:19 |
| 17. | "Outer Space/Carry On" | | | 6:38 |
| Total length: | | | | 64:28 |

Sounds Good Feels Good – Target exclusive bonus tracks
| No. | Title | Writer(s) | Length |
|---|---|---|---|
| 18. | "The Space Between a Rock and a Hard Place" | Hood; Clifford; Michael Joseph Green; Cristi Vaughan | 3:23 |
| 19. | "Story of Another Us" | Hemmings; Josh Ramsay | 3:56 |
| Total length: | | | 71:47 |

Sounds Good Feels Good – Japan bonus tracks
| No. | Title | Writer(s) | Length |
|---|---|---|---|
| 18. | "Lost in Reality" | Clifford; Hood; Deryck Whibley; Mike Green | 3:30 |
| 19. | "Over and Out" | Clifford; Hood; Whibley; Mike Green; Gaskarth | 2:58 |
| Total length: | | | 70:56 |

Sounds Good Feels Good – Japan re-release bonus tracks
| No. | Title | Writer(s) | Length |
|---|---|---|---|
| 18. | "Lost in Reality" | Clifford; Hood; Whibley; Mike Green | 3:30 |
| 19. | "Over and Out" | Clifford; Hood; Whibley; Mike Green; Gaskarth | 2:58 |
| 20. | "Broken Pieces" | Clifford; Hood; Whibley; Mike Green | 3:29 |
| 21. | "She's Kinda Hot (alternate version)" | Irwin; Clifford; Feldmann | 3:35 |
| Total length: | | | 78:00 |

Sounds Good Feels Good — B-Sides and Rarities EP
| No. | Title | Length |
|---|---|---|
| 1. | "Safety Pin" | 3:29 |
| 2. | "The Girl Who Cried Wolf" | 4:22 |
| 3. | "Broken Home" | 3:40 |
| 4. | "The Space Between a Rock and a Hard Place" | 3:22 |
| 5. | "Story of Another Us" | 3:55 |

Notes

- Credits adapted from liner notes.
- "Hey Everybody!" contains elements from Duran Duran's 1982 single "Hungry Like the Wolf".
- "San Francisco" contains additional vocals by Bonnie McKee and Sarah Hudson.

=== Formats ===
Several limited edition album bundle formats are available via the band's official store, which each contain a variety of items relating to the album. They are as follows:

- Standard CD (14 tracks)
- Deluxe CD (17 tracks)
- Deluxe CD + "Safety Pin" T-shirt
- Deluxe CD + fanified poster
- Numbered 12" vinyl (14 tracks)
- Numbered 12" vinyl + "Safety Pin" T-shirt
- Numbered 12" vinyl + fanified poster
- Limited edition merchandise bundle including: Deluxe CD, "Safety Pin" T-shirt, Crown Hoodie, "Safety Pin" Beanie Hat, "New Broken Scene" pack and "Sounds Good Feels Good" wristband
- Deluxe fan box containing deluxe CD, "Safety Pin" Beanie Hat, "Sounds Good Feels Good" wristband and sew-on-patch

== Personnel ==
Credits adapted from AllMusic.

5 Seconds of Summer

- Luke Hemmings – rhythm guitar, lead and backing vocals
- Calum Hood – bass guitar, lead and backing vocals
- Ashton Irwin – drums, percussion, keyboards, lead and backing vocals
- Michael Clifford – lead guitar, keyboards, lead and backing vocals

Additional musicians

- Bonnie McKee – vocals
- Sarah Hudson – vocals
- Steven Solomon – guitar
- London Symphony Orchestra – strings

Technical

- John Feldmann – engineer, producer
- Zakk Cervini – engineer
- Matt Pauling – engineer, guitar arrangements
- Michael Green – engineer, producer, programming
- David Hodges – programming
- Stefan Johnson – engineer
- Nico Stadi – instrumentation, programming
- Eric Valentine – mastering, mixing

Design

- Richard Andrews – art direction, design
- Tom Van Schelven – photography
- Dan Evans – illustrations

== Charts ==
=== Weekly charts ===
Weekly chart performance for Sounds Good Feels Good
| Chart (2015) | Peak position |
|---|---|
| Australian Albums (ARIA) | 1 |
| Austrian Albums (Ö3 Austria) | 1 |
| Belgian Albums (Ultratop Flanders) | 2 |
| Belgian Albums (Ultratop Wallonia) | 8 |
| Canadian Albums (Billboard) | 1 |
| Danish Albums (Hitlisten) | 3 |
| Dutch Albums (Album Top 100) | 1 |
| Finnish Albums (Suomen virallinen lista) | 2 |
| French Albums (SNEP) | 12 |
| German Albums (Offizielle Top 100) | 3 |
| Greek Albums (IFPI) | 3 |
| Hungarian Albums (MAHASZ) | 13 |
| Irish Albums (IRMA) | 1 |
| Italian Albums (FIMI) | 1 |
| New Zealand Albums (RMNZ) | 2 |
| Norwegian Albums (VG-lista) | 1 |
| Polish Albums (ZPAV) | 10 |
| Portuguese Albums (AFP) | 2 |
| Scottish Albums (Official Charts) | 1 |
| South Korean Albums (Circle) | 75 |
| Spanish Albums (Promusicae) | 2 |
| Swedish Albums (Sverigetopplistan) | 3 |
| UK Albums (Official Charts) | 1 |
| UK Album Downloads (Official Charts) | 1 |
| US Billboard 200 | 1 |
| US Vinyl Albums (Billboard) | 3 |

=== Year-end charts ===
2015 year-end chart performance for Sounds Good Feels Good
| Chart (2015) | Position |
|---|---|
| Australian Albums (ARIA) | 46 |
| Belgian Albums (Ultratop Flanders) | 97 |
| Dutch Albums (Album Top 100) | 57 |
| Italian Albums (FIMI) | 82 |
| Mexican Albums (AMPROFON) | 76 |
| Spanish Albums (PROMUSICAE) | 94 |
| UK Albums (OCC) | 83 |
| US Billboard 200 | 136 |

2016 year-end chart performance for Sounds Good Feels Good
| Chart (2016) | Position |
|---|---|
| US Billboard 200 | 192 |

== Certifications ==
Certifications for Sounds Good Feels Good
| Region | Certification | Certified units/sales |
|---|---|---|
| Australia (ARIA) | Gold | 35,000^{‡} |
| New Zealand (RMNZ) | Gold | 7,500^{‡} |
| Poland (ZPAV) | Gold | 10,000^{‡} |
| United Kingdom (BPI) | Gold | 100,000^{‡} |
| United States (RIAA) | Gold | 500,000^{‡} |
^{‡} Sales+streaming figures based on certification alone.

== Release history ==
Release history and formats for Sounds Good Feels Good
| Region | Date | Format | Label | Ref. |
|---|---|---|---|---|
| Worldwide | 23 October 2015 | CD; limited vinyl; digital download | Hi or Hey; Capitol | |
