= She's Kinda Hot =

2015 single by 5 Seconds of Summer

Single by 5 Seconds of Summer

from the album Sounds Good Feels Good
- B-side: "The Girl Who Cried Wolf" (7")
- Released: 17 July 2015
- Recorded: 2015
- Genre: Pop-punk; pop rock
- Length: 3:36
- Label: Capitol; Hi or Hey
- Songwriters: Michael Clifford; Ashton Irwin; John Feldmann; Benji Madden; Joel Madden
- Producer: John Feldmann

5 Seconds of Summer singles chronology
"What I Like About You" (2014)	"She's Kinda Hot" (2015)	"Hey Everybody!" (2015)

Music video
- "She's Kinda Hot" on YouTube

"She's Kinda Hot" is a song by Australian pop rock band 5 Seconds of Summer. The song is the first single from the band's second album Sounds Good Feels Good. The pop-punk and pop rock song was co-written by band members Ashton Irwin and Michael Clifford, alongside Benji and Joel Madden of Good Charlotte and produced by John Feldmann. It was released worldwide on 17 July 2015. The music video was released on 5 August 2015 and has more than 50 million views as of 7 August 2018.

The band followed up the single's release with an EP release on 28 August 2015, featuring bonus tracks and physical editions on both CD and vinyl in certain countries.

== Background ==
Bassist Calum Hood stated in an interview with radio host Angus O'Loughiln: "The title is really misleading because the song is about people not caring of what others think, it's a revolution for outcasts. It has a deep meaning." Lead guitarist Michael Clifford stated, "The song is heavy as hell, heavier than our previous songs. We were shocked but happy with the reviews."

== Composition ==
"She's Kinda Hot" is composed in the key of E major with a tempo of 116–120 beats per minute. Both the verses and chorus are based around twelve-bar blues, specifically, the shuffle-blues chord progression (I I I I / IV IV I I / V IV I I).

== Music video ==
The video directed by Isaac Rentz and shot at the Warner Brothers lot in Hollywood has the band heading into a McMansion garage and working on a vehicle and then, for some reason, are now lounging on the porch of a different house that is more modest farmhouse with deciduous trees and Michael plays an acoustic guitar Deliverance-style. Intercut is scenes of a guy playing a video game in a 70's style basement with '80s touches and sodacans/pizza/takeout, a guy eats a bowl of cereal and a guy attends a psychotherapist session. All guys get in undesirable situations with high functioning society participants, the video gamer gets harangued by a girlfriend and her friends then abandoned, the cereal eater gets milk and cereal poured on his head by his older jock brother and his friend and the psychotherapist finally drives her client to a rage. The band then drives their band stage float thats in the style of the Japanese-esque dekotora and then puts on a street concert for the neighbourhoods kid. The video ends with the camera panning up into the night sky and the vehicle exhaust fumes dissipating.

== Extended play ==
The extended play was released in 2015 which contains four tracks: "She's Kinda Hot" (alternative version), "Broken Pieces", "Over and Out", and "Lost in Reality".

== Track listing ==
=== Extended play ===
Digital EP
No.	Title	Writer(s)	Length
1.	"She's Kinda Hot" (alternate version)	Michael Clifford; Ashton Irwin; Benji Madden; Joel Madden; John Feldmann	3:35
2.	"Broken Pieces"	Clifford; Calum Hood; Alex Gaskarth; Deryck Whibley; Michael Green	3:29
3.	"Over and Out"	Clifford; Hood; Whibley; Green; Gaskarth	2:58
4.	"Lost in Reality"	Luke Hemmings; Clifford; Hood; Whibley; Green	3:30

Amazon digital EP
No.	Title	Writer(s)	Length
1.	"She's Kinda Hot" (alternate version)	Clifford; Irwin; B. Madden; J. Madden; Feldmann	3:35
2.	"The Girl Who Cried Wolf"	Luke Hemmings; Clifford; Hood; Irwin; Feldmann	4:18
3.	"Safety Pin"	Hemmings; Hood; Clifford; Irwin; Feldmann; Emily Warren	3:27
4.	"Broken Pieces"	Clifford; Hood; Whibley; Green	3:29

=== Single ===
Digital download
No.	Title	Length
1.	"She's Kinda Hot"	3:39

7" vinyl
No.	Title	Length
1.	"She's Kinda Hot"	3:39
2.	"The Girl Who Cried Wolf"	4:18

CD single
No.	Title	Length
1.	"She's Kinda Hot"	3:39
2.	"Broken Pieces"	3:29
3.	"Lost in Reality"	3:30

CD single (HMV exclusive)
No.	Title	Length
1.	"She's Kinda Hot"	3:39
2.	"Over and Out"	2:58

== Charts ==
=== Weekly charts ===
Weekly chart performance for "She's Kinda Hot"
Chart (2015)	Peak position
Australia (ARIA)	6
Austria (Ö3 Austria Top 40)	35
Belgium (Ultratop 50 Flanders)	46
Belgium (Ultratip Bubbling Under Wallonia)	11
Canada Hot 100 (Billboard)	27
Czech Republic Airplay (ČNS IFPI)	72
Czech Republic Singles Digital (ČNS IFPI)	61
France (SNEP)	62
Germany (GfK)	76
Greece Digital Songs (Billboard)	5
Ireland (IRMA)	6
Japan Hot 100 (Billboard)	90
Mexico Ingles Airplay (Billboard)	38
Netherlands (Single Top 100)	57
New Zealand (Recorded Music NZ)	11
Portugal Digital Song Sales (Billboard)	9
Scottish Singles Sales (Official Charts)	9
Spain (Promusicae)	14
Sweden (Sverigetopplistan)	95
Switzerland (Schweizer Hitparade)	59
UK Singles (Official Charts)	14
US Billboard Hot 100	22
US Pop Airplay (Billboard)	15

=== Year-end charts ===
Year-end chart performance for "She's Kinda Hot"
Chart (2015)	Position
Australian Artist Singles (ARIA)	32

== Certifications ==
Region	Certification	Certified units/sales
Australia (ARIA)	Platinum	70,000^{‡}
New Zealand (RMNZ)	Gold	15,000^{‡}
United Kingdom (BPI)	Gold	400,000^{‡}
United States (RIAA)	Platinum	1,000,000^{‡}
^{‡} Sales+streaming figures based on certification alone.

== Release history ==
Region	Date	Format(s)	Record label	Ref.
Worldwide	17 July 2015	Digital download	Capitol; Hi or Hey	
Italy	17 July 2015	Radio airplay	Universal	
Worldwide	28 August 2015	Digital EP; CD; 7"	Capitol; Hi or Hey	
