= Chandler Leighton =

Los Angeles based Pop Musician

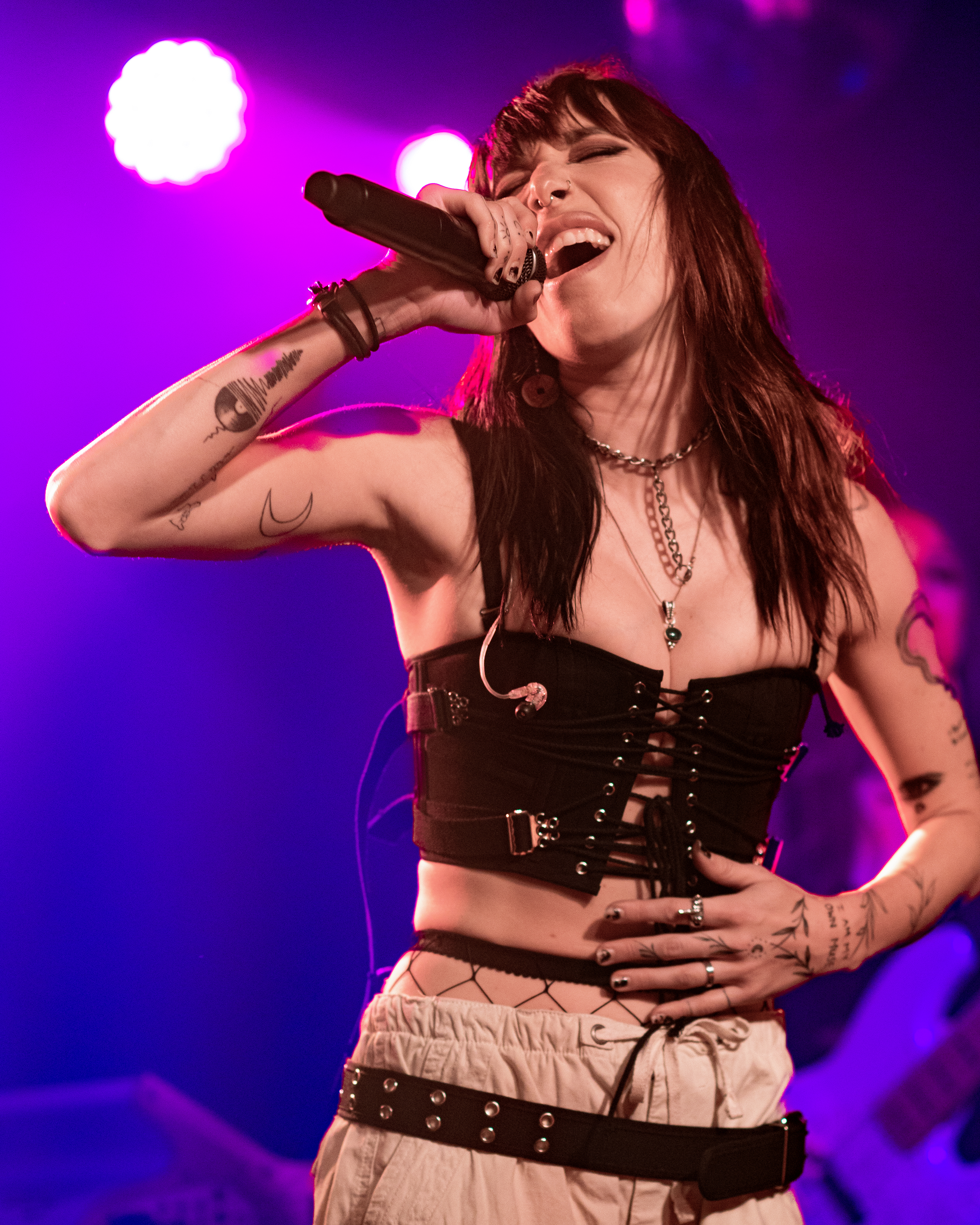
- Chandler Leighton in 2023

Background information
- Born: Chandler Rebecca Leighton; September 5, 1995 (age 31); Los Angeles, California
- Origin: Los Angeles, California
- Genres: Pop Rock; Alt pop
- Occupations: Singer; songwriter
- Instruments: Vocals; Guitar
- Years active: 2014-present
- Label: Boom Records

Chandler Leighton (/tʃændlɜːr leɪtɒn/ Chan-dlər Lay-ton, born September 5, 1995) is an American singer-songwriter and musician based in Los Angeles, California. She auditioned for the 14th and 15th seasons of American Idol, successfully making it to the first round. In 2020 she released her debut single, "Elenor Rigby," but her big breakthrough came in 2022 with the release of her song "When You Say My Name." In 2024 Leigton released her debut album Proof You Weren't The Only One.

== Early life ==
Chandler Rebecca Leighton was born September 5, 1995, in Los Angeles, California, to father, John Leighton and mother, Melissa Arnson. When Leighton was 7 years old her parents filed for divorce and she went to live with her mother with her two siblings in Bethel, Maine. She attended Crescent Park School from 2nd to 5th grade. When Leighton was 11, she went back to LA and lived with her father. She attended San Francisco State University, where she studied audio production engineering.

== Career ==
=== 2014-2021: American Idol and Career Beginnings ===
In 2014 Leighton auditioned for American reality singing competition show American Idol during its 14th season For her audition she sang "New York State of Mind" by Billy Joel. All three judges voted to advance Leighton on to the Hollywood Round. She was not amongst those to make it beyond this round.

Leighton would audition for Idol again the following year, her audition wasn't televised though she would advance after receiving two out three votes, advancing her to the Hollywood Round once again. Just like the previous year, Leighton would not advance beyond this point.

In 2019, Leighton was featured on Ascend (Illenium album), on the final track called "Lonely."

In 2020 Leighton would release her debut single titled, “Elenor Rigby.” Later in 2021, Leighton would release 5 singles, "Curtain Call", "Alone", "Would You", "Lie Awake" and "Let It Go."

=== 2022 - 2024: A Letter to My Vices and Proof You Weren’t The Only One ===
In March 2022 Leighton released a standalone single, “When You Say My Name,” which she had stated her career defining song. 2022 would also be the year that Leighton released her debut EP, A Letter To My Vices, which featured singles, “Oxytocin”, a version of “Let It Go” featuring Lo Spirit, “I Think You Turned Me”, "WTF happened last night” and "4 UR Entertainment." Leighton capped off the year releasing a single with singer Dezi called "Witch Hunt."

In 2023 Leighton released various songs to be included in her upcoming debut album. Starting with “A Letter To Everyone Who’s Hurt Me." She followed up with the release of more singles. The final single to be released before the Album would release was “Got What I Wanted.” In April 2024 she released her Debut Album, Proof You Weren’t The Only One.

In the summer of 2024 Leighton announced her first tour, the Sick Tour, with guest Haiden Henderson. Leading up to the tour Leighton would release two new singles, "Freak Show" and "Touchin' Me." After the tour concluded Leighton would release one last stand alone single that year, “Pretty Girl I’ll Make You Famous.”

=== 2025 - Present: Coming up for Air and upcoming second album ===
In 2025 Leighton would release of new singles to be included in Leighton's upcoming EP, Coming Up For Air, which included singles, "Say Less", "LOSIN' MY MIND", "EMERGENCY (SOS)", and "SUPERMODEL". She also went on tour with Natalie Jane for her Sick To My Stomach Tour and supported Johnnie Guilbert on his Violent Dream Tour. 2025 also marked the start of Leighton using a live band in her music. The band consists of drummer, Sage Weeber, guitarist, Constance Day, and bassist, Aubrey Harris.

In Early 2026 Leighton has released three singles, "Waiting For You To Heal", "Wasted Potential" and "Blood ≠ Water". In April 2026 Leighton announced that she would be joining singer Vana, on The Lady in Red Tour. In August Leighton released "F Off Off My MIND" and in October released "TURN THE LIGHTS OFF". Leighton's second album, 4th Element, is set to release in February 2027.

== Artistry ==
Prior to launching her solo career, Leighton was involved in the EDM scene. She provided vocals to a number of projects including the song "Lonely" off the ILLENIUM album, ASCEND.

Leighton's music crosses into many genres, especially Dark Pop, Alt Pop, Indie Pop, Pop Rock, electro and occasionally acoustic pop.

Thematically, Leighton's music delves into the darker side of the industry." She makes songs that can resonate with her audience's experiences and offer a form of escapism. Leighton says that it's easier for her to make music from the sad and traumatic experiences of her life more so than her positive ones. For example, her 2023 song "A Letter to Everyone Who's Hurt Me" a song about a dysfunctional family. Or self discovery in the song "I Think You Turned Me."

== Discography ==
Albums
Name	Year
Proof You Weren't The Only One	2024

Extended Plays
Name	Year
A Letter To My Vices	2022
Coming Up For Air	2025

Singles
Name	Year	Album
Elenor Rigby	2020	Non Album Single
Curtain Call	2021	Non Album Single
Alone	2021	Non Album Single
Would You	2021	Non Album Single
Lie Awake	2021	Non Album Single
Let it Go	2021	A Letter To My Vices
When You Say My Name	2022	Non Album Single
Oxytocin	2022	A Letter To My Vices
I Think You Turned Me	2022	A Letter To My Vices
WTF Happened Last Night	2022	A Letter To My Vices
Witch Hunt (featuring Dezi)	2022	Non Album Single
A Letter To Everyone Whos Hurt Me	2023	Proof You Weren't The Only One
Monster	2023	Proof You Weren't The Only One
Fixer Upper	2023	Proof You Weren't The Only One
Extra Extra	2023	Proof You Weren't The Only One
American Dream	2023	Proof You Weren't The Only One
Half Life	2023	Proof You Weren't The Only One
A Late Apology	2024	Proof You Weren't The Only One
ETA	2024	Proof You Weren't The Only One
Got What I Wanted	2024	Proof You Weren't The Only One
FREAK SHOW	2024	Non Album Single
touchin' me	2024	Non Album Single
pretty girl I'll make you famous	2024	Non Album Single
Say Less	2025	Coming Up For Air
Losin' My Mind	2025	Coming Up For Air
Emergency (SOS)	2025	Coming Up For Air
Supermodel	2025	Coming Up For Air
Waiting For You To Heal	2026	Non Album Single
Wasted Potential	2026	Non Album Single
Blood ≠ Water	2026	Non Album Single
F Off Off My MIND	2026	Non Album Single
TURN THE LIGHTS OFF	2026	Non Album Single
POISON	2026	Non Album Single
