= Makeout (band) =

American pop punk band

MAKEOUT
- Origin: Providence, Rhode Island
- Genres: Pop punk; pop rock
- Years active: 2012–present
- Label: Rise
- Members: Scott Eckel; Tyler Young; Kyle Dee; AJ Khah
- Past members: Sam Boxold; Travis Danforth; Patrick Devin; Jake Nathaniel; Chris Piquette; Alex Lofton
- Website: https://www.makeoutofficial.com/

MAKEOUT (formerly Trophy Wives) is an American pop punk band formed in Providence, Rhode Island. The group consists of drummer Scott Eckel, lead guitarist Tyler Young, vocalist Kyle Dee, and bassist AJ Khah.

The group's debut album, The Good Life, was released via Rise Records in 2017. Young describes the band's sound as "Distorted guitars, crazy drum fills, really catchy melodies, and a bit of emotional angst sprinkled on top."

== History ==
=== Formation as Trophy Wives and debut EPs (2012–2017) ===
The group independently released its debut EP Letting Go self-produced and recorded by Chris Piquette in 2012. In 2013, the band independently released a second EP, also produced and recorded by Piquette, One Way Trip to Mars. In 2014, the group won a battle of the bands competition and performed a date on the Warped Tour; in 2015, the group played 9 dates.

=== Signing, name change, and The Good Life (2017–2019) ===
In 2017, the band signed to Rise Records and changed its name to MAKEOUT. The group's debut album, The Good Life, was released via Rise in 2017.

MAKEOUT gained more recognition while opening for Blink 182 alongside The Naked and Famous. In 2020, they shared that they would "love to [tour with them] again."

=== Lineup changes and second album (2018–present) ===
During the Warped Tour 2018, Jake Nathaniel, (previously of acts, The Home Scene, and Silence the Radio) stepped in to replace Alex Lofton. Nathaniel joined the band to fill in for live performances. Nathaniel's tenure with the band was temporary, concluding after the tour with Cute Is What We Aim For in the Fall of 2018.

On January 24, 2019, lead singer Sam Boxold announced his departure from the group after their 20/20 tour. In September 2019, MAKEOUT announced that they would be moving forward with the band, with Scott Eckel and Tyler Young remaining, AJ Khah joining as bassist, and Kyle Dee joining as vocalist. MAKEOUT met Khah on Warped Tour years earlier and Young noted that Dee "really nailed the audition" when they were looking for a new vocalist.

The band played in Providence, Chicago, and Boston in December 2019 with a new album released in the first quarter of 2020. The band also announced they would no longer be playing "Secrets" live, a song that courted controversy for explicit misogyny and threats of violence against women that were further condemned by Real Friends frontman Dan Lambton. Young stated the reasoning behind no longer playing the song was to establish that MAKEOUT was "...a new band and we want people to focus on that." They also explained that the band are now "more focused on the message that [they're] putting out into the world."

On July 10, 2020, the band released their first single with the new lineup, called Home. " Dee explained that the song is "about wanting to be in a safe place. Feeling comfortable and warm," as well as sharing that COVID-19 pandemic lockdowns helped the band "be creative and think outside the box."

== Discography ==
Studio albums

Title	Album details
The Good Life	Released: September 29, 2017; Label: Rise; Format: CD, DL

Singles

Title	Year	Album
"Crazy"	2017	The Good Life
