= Calum Hood =

Australian bassist (born 1996)

- Hood in 2026

Background information
- Born: Calum Thomas Hood; 25 January 1996 (age 30); Sydney, New South Wales, Australia
- Genres: Pop rock; pop; power pop; pop-punk; new wave; alternative rock
- Occupation: Musician
- Instruments: Bass guitar; vocals; keyboards
- Years active: 2011–present
- Member of: 5 Seconds of Summer

Calum Thomas Hood (born 25 January 1996) is an Australian musician, known for being the bassist and a vocalist of the pop rock band 5 Seconds of Summer. Since 2014, the band have sold more than 10 million albums, sold over two million concert tickets worldwide, and surpassed seven billion song streams, making them one of the most successful Australian musical exports in history.

Hood's debut solo album, Order Chaos Order, was released on 13 June 2025.

== Early life ==
Calum Thomas Hood was born on 25 January 1996 and raised in Mount Druitt, New South Wales. His father, David Hood, is a former Coca-Cola employee, while his mother, Joy Hood, worked in the superannuation industry. Through his father, he claims Scottish descent, and through his mother, he claims Māori descent. Hood is the younger brother of singer-songwriter, Mali-Koa. Hood recalls his childhood upbringing to be "middle-class" and "not the most glamorous life". Hood attended Norwest Primary School, where he befriended future band-mate Michael Clifford in the third grade. For his high-school education, Hood attended Norwest Christian College, where he befriended future band-mate Luke Hemmings in Year 7 after they performed a Secondhand Serenade cover at a school talent show.

Throughout his childhood and early teenage years, Hood took a keen interest in sports, particularly football (soccer), which he had a "promising future" in and visited a Brazil training camp for, in order to pursue the sport as a career. However, after the formation of the band and due to the band's move to London in late 2012, he ultimately decided to stop playing football to instead pursue music. Hood later recalled that after quitting football, "there was a period of a month where my parents thought I was making the worst decision of my life. My mum threw out all the clothes in my closet. And I left [...] just being like, I made one of the biggest decisions. But now it's worked out". Following his decision to quit playing football, he dropped out of high school in 2012 after completing Year 11.

== Career ==
In 2011, Hood, Clifford and Hemmings began posting song covers on Hemmings' YouTube channel. The trio eventually added mutual friend Ashton Irwin to their videos, forming the current 5 Seconds of Summer lineup. After months of posting song covers together, the band began attracting interest from major music labels and publishers and signed a publishing deal with Sony/ATV Music Publishing. Hood has since released six studio albums with the band: 5 Seconds of Summer (2014), Sounds Good Feels Good (2015), Youngblood (2018), Calm (2020), 5SOS5 (2022) and Everyone's a Star! (2025).

Apart from the band, Hood has co-written songs for other artists, including the Black Veil Brides and Makeout.

On 11 April 2025, Hood announced his debut solo album, Order Chaos Order, to be released through EMI Music Australia on 13 June. The lead single "Don't Forget You Love Me" was released on the same day.

== Personal life ==
In 2017, it was reported that Hood bought a house, previously owned by Richie Kotzen, in the Hollywood Hills neighborhood of Los Angeles. As of 2020, Hood's net-worth is estimated to be $20 million (USD).

== Discography ==
=== Albums ===
List of albums, with selected details
Title	Details	Peak chart positions						
Title	Details	AUS	BEL (FL)	GER	NLD	SCO	UK	US
Order Chaos Order	Released: 13 June 2025; Label: EMI Music; Format: LP, CD, digital	1	28	20	24	7	54	179

=== Singles ===
List of singles
Title	Year	Peak chart positions	Album
Title	Year	NZ Hot	Album
"Don't Forget You Love Me"	2025	39	Order Chaos Order
"Call Me When You Know Better"	2025	—	Order Chaos Order
"Sunsetter"	2025	—	Order Chaos Order

=== Song credits ===
Year	Title	Artist	Album	Notes
2014	"Teenage Queen"	Donghae & Eunhyuk	Ride Me	Composer
2017	"Ride It Out"	Makeout	The Good Life	Composer
2018	"Wake Up"	Black Veil Brides	Vale	Composer
2018	"Golden Days"	Steve Aoki	Neon Future III	Writer
2020	"Cariño"	302	-	Bass
2020	"The Art of Letting Go"	Mali-Koa	Hunger	Composer, producer
2025	"Cool"	Michael Clifford	Sidequest	Writer
