= X (Poppy song) =

Single by Poppy

from the album Am I a Girl?
- Released: October 25, 2018
- Recorded: 2017
- Genre: Heavy metal; nu metal; power pop
- Length: 2:54; 2:08 (acoustic version)
- Label: I'm Poppy; Mad Decent
- Songwriters: Moriah Pereira; Corey Mixter; Chris Greatti; Zakk Cervini
- Producer: Zakk Cervini

Poppy singles chronology
"Hard Feelings" (2018)	"X" (2018)	"Voicemail" (2019)

Alternative cover
- Acoustic version cover

Music video
- "X" on YouTube

"X" is a song by American singer Poppy. It was released on October 25, 2018 by Mad Decent as the fifth and final single from her second studio album Am I a Girl? (2018). The song was written by Poppy, Titanic Sinclair, Chris Greatti and the producer Zakk Cervini. Musically, the song explores heavy metal, a musical departure for Poppy at the time.

The song and Poppy's new direction in music were positively reviewed by critics. Its music video was inspired by the 1976 film Carrie. It later became the official theme song for NXT TakeOver: Phoenix the following January, and an acoustic version was released during the same month.

== Background and composition ==
Poppy released her second studio album Am I a Girl? on October 31, 2018. The album mainly features an electro-pop sound and was also preceded by four pop singles. "X" was released as Am I a Girl?'s fifth single few days before the album's release. The music video followed on November 5. An acoustic version of "X" was released on Poppy's YouTube channel on January 8, 2019, and was later released for digital streaming on January 17.

"X" has been described by critics as a heavy metal, nu metal and power pop song. Similar to "Play Destroy", her collaboration with Grimes, "X" explores heavier territory, with Poppy describing both tracks as a new genre called "Poppymetal". "X" features "contradicting verses and melodies", with heavy metal parts in which the singer "begs to be made bloody" and peaceful sections with harmonies where she sings about wanting to "love everyone". The song is in the key of F♯ minor with a BPM of 114.

== Reception ==
Andy Hill from Gigwise states: "It's a masterpiece. So much packed in – the legit death metal, the retro-horror shoutouts, the note-perfect peace and love hippy interludes. It's her 'Bohemian Rhapsody'. High art for the Ritalin generation."

Anna Fair from Alternative Press states: "While the peaceful verses are accompanied by delightful harmonies and a scene right out of the '60s, the immediate scene following is dark. Heavy metal guitars back Poppy's vocals, and she gets her wish ['please get me bloody']."

== Track listings ==
Digital download and streaming

1. "X" – 2:54

Digital download and streaming (acoustic)

1. "X" (acoustic) – 2:08

== Release history ==
Release dates and formats for "X"
Region	Date	Formats	Version	Labels	Ref.
Various	October 25, 2018	Digital download; streaming	Original	I'm Poppy; Mad Decent	
Various	January 17, 2019	Digital download; streaming	Acoustic	I'm Poppy; Mad Decent	
