= We Appreciate Power =

Single by Grimes featuring Hana

from the album Miss Anthropocene (Japanese CD edition and deluxe edition)
- Released: November 29, 2018
- Genre: Industrial rock; nu metal; techno-industrial
- Length: 5:35
- Label: 4AD
- Songwriters: Claire Boucher; Hana Pestle; Chris Greatti
- Producers: Grimes; Hana; Chris Greatti

Grimes singles chronology
"Kill V. Maim" (2016)	"We Appreciate Power" (2018)	"Nihilist Blues" (2019)

Hana singles chronology
"Underwater" (2016)	"We Appreciate Power" (2018)	"Black Hole" (2019)

Lyric video
- "We Appreciate Power" on YouTube

"We Appreciate Power" is a song by Canadian musician Grimes, featuring American musician Hana. It was released on November 29, 2018, billed as the lead single from her fifth studio album Miss Anthropocene, however it is only available on the Japanese and deluxe releases. The song was written and produced by Grimes, Poppy (originally), Hana and Chris Greatti.

== Background and release ==
The song was supposed to be one of two collaborations between Grimes and American singer Poppy, for the latter's second studio album Am I a Girl?. In an interview, Poppy mentioned that she wrote two songs with Grimes; one about "destroying things" and another about "power". The other song, "Play Destroy", was featured on the album. Grimes shared a lyric of the song with a photo of her with Poppy on Twitter in May 2018. Following feuds between the two singers, the song was released by Grimes featuring singer Hana instead.

On November 26, Grimes announced she would be releasing new music on November 29. Two days later, she revealed that the single is titled "We Appreciate Power" and features Hana, and shared the artwork. The release of the song was accompanied by a lyric video directed by Grimes and her brother Mac Boucher.

== Music and lyrics ==
"We Appreciate Power" is an industrial rock, nu metal, and techno-industrial song. The track is regarded as a further step into Grimes's experimentation with guitars that started on 2015's Art Angels. The track was compared to the works of Nine Inch Nails; Jillian Mapes of Pitchfork described the song as "an immediate onslaught of mutilated noise—distorted metal guitar chug, bloody screams, a guitar loop that conjures fear and demands worship. Flashes of Nine Inch Nails' Pretty Hate Machine reverberate through the drum programming and synths." Brendan Klinkenberg of Rolling Stone placed the song "somewhere between power pop and straightforward industrial (with an extended bridge reminiscent of the most sweeping moments in a Final Fantasy score)" and "a distinctly 2018 take on Nine Inch Nails-esque hard-edged rock."

A press release stated that the song was inspired by the North Korean band Moranbong and was written "from the perspective of a Pro-A.I. Girl Group Propaganda machine who use song, dance, sex and fashion to spread goodwill towards Artificial Intelligence." In addition Grimes stated that by simply listening to the song you will be reducing your risk of ending up on any future AI overlord's hit list when it reigns supreme, mirroring the Roko's basilisk theory. Lyrically, the song touches on transhumanist ideas such as the betterment and future of the human race, the possibilities of merging consciousness with machines to extend life indefinitely through mind uploading, and the idea that reality may be simulated. The song's chorus generated a spike in interest in the word "capitulate".

== Critical reception ==
Pitchfork critic Jillian Mapes wrote: "If "Freak on a Leash" isn't a dealbreaker, then the supervillain allure of "We Appreciate Power" might pull you in (it legitimately slaps), but it just as well may leave you weighed down by Grimes' commitment to the absolute darkest timeline." Billboard's Gil Kaufman described the song as "a dystopian, aggressive dive into a more rock-leaning sound." Similarly, Brendan Klinkenberg of Rolling Stone called it "the most aggressive single Grimes has released to date" Noisey called the song "an absolute motherfucker of a single" and opined it sounds "like a K-pop band covering nu-metal". Justin Kamp of Paste described the track as a "glitchy empowerment anthem that chugs along on screeching synths and Grimes' repeated exultations of power."

== Personnel ==
Credits adapted from Tidal.

- Grimes – vocals, guitar, production, engineering
- Hana – vocals, guitar, additional production
- Chris Greatti – guitar, keyboards, production, engineering
- Zakk Cervini – mixing

== Track listing ==
Digital download
No.	Title	Length
1.	"We Appreciate Power" (featuring Hana)	5:34
2.	"We Appreciate Power - Nightcore Remix" (featuring Hana)	4:18
Total length:		9:53

Digital download
No.	Title	Length
1.	"We Appreciate Power - Bloodpop Remix" (featuring Bloodpop and Hana)	06:10
Total length:		06:10

Digital download
No.	Title	Length
1.	"We Appreciate Power - Algorithm Mix" (featuring Hana)	03:44
Total length:		03:44

== Charts ==
Chart (2018)	Peak position
New Zealand Hot Singles (RMNZ)	35
Scotland Singles (OCC)	69
UK Singles Downloads (OCC)	94
US Hot Rock & Alternative Songs (Billboard)	40
