= Matteo Loglio =

Italian interaction designer

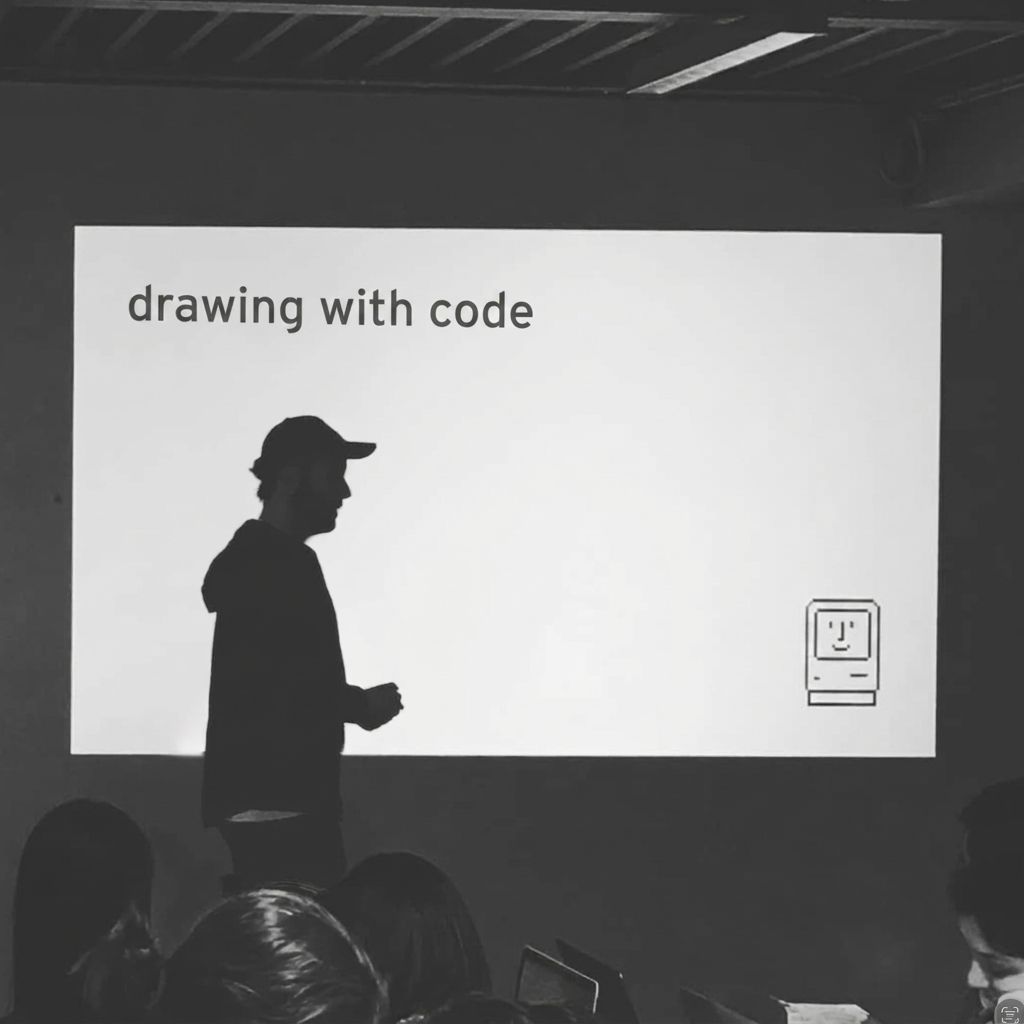
- Matteo Loglio teaching a creative coding class
- Other name: matlo
- Occupation: Interaction designer
- Known for: Co-founder of Primo Toys (Cubetto); designer of NSynth Super
- Website: matlo.me

Matteo Loglio (known as matlo) is an Italian interaction designer. He is best known as a co-founder of Primo Toys, the London-based company behind the children's coding robot Cubetto, and as the designer of NSynth Super, an open-source musical instrument developed at Google Creative Lab. He is also a co-founder of the design studio oio.

His work has been characterised as combining the traditional imprint of Italian design with qualities described as "very democratic, accessible and elegant in its simplicity".

== Education ==
Loglio studied at MAInD, the Master in Interaction Design programme at SUPSI in Lugano, completing the course in 2012.

== Career ==
Loglio began his career in Italy working with Arduino, the open-source electronics platform. In 2013 he co-founded Primo Toys, a London-based startup behind Cubetto, a screen-free wooden robot that teaches computational thinking to children through tangible coding blocks. He later joined Google Creative Lab, where he contributed to NSynth Super, an open-source musical instrument that uses a neural network to generate sounds. In 2019 he co-founded oio, a design studio focused on emerging technologies and artificial intelligence.

In 2021 Loglio published the children's book Many Intelligences: What Do Robots, Starfish, and Toasters Think About? with Corraini Edizioni. In 2026, Loglio worked with the Victoria and Albert Museum and YouTube to design a recreated early YouTube watch page accompanying the museum's acquisition of Me at the zoo, the first video uploaded to YouTube, for its permanent collection.

== Teaching ==
Loglio has taught as a visiting lecturer at Central Saint Martins in London, MAInD Lugano, and HEAD – Genève, as well as at the Copenhagen Institute of Interaction Design (CIID), Harbour.Space University, and ISIA Urbino.

== Honours and awards ==
- IXDA Interaction Award, IUVO, 2013.
- Cannes Lions Product Design Lion, Cubetto, 2016.
- Red Dot Design Award, Best of the Best, Cubetto, 2017.
- D&AD Graphite Pencil, Environmental Sustainability, Cubetto, 2017.
- Good Design Award, Cubetto, 2017.
- D&AD Yellow Pencil, Product Design, NSynth Super, 2018.
- Cannes Lions Bronze, Outdoor, Draw to Art, 2018.
- D&AD Graphite Pencil, Digital Design, Draw to Art, 2019.

== Exhibitions ==
- Archives du Design Romand, mudac, Lausanne, 2024–2025
- The Last Pencil, DROPCITY, Milan Design Week, 2023
- SPACE10 pop-up at LOOT, Mexico City, 2022
- La gran imaginación. Historias del futuro, Espacio Fundación Telefónica, Madrid, 2021
- The Future Starts Here, Victoria and Albert Museum, London, 2018
- Giro Giro Tondo. Design for Kids, Triennale di Milano, 2017
- Water, Copeland Gallery, London, 2017
- Unread Messages, The Aram Gallery, London, 2015
- London Tech City, Museum of Modern Art, New York, 2015
