= I o (musician) =

American DJ and record producer (1990–2020)

i_o
- Also known as: Fawks; GLock; RONIKS
- Born: Garrett Falls Lockhart; May 16, 1990; Richmond, Virginia, U.S.
- Died: November 23, 2020 (aged 30) Los Angeles, California, U.S.
- Genres: EDM; techno; house; dubstep
- Occupations: DJ; record producer; remixer
- Years active: 2012–2020
- Labels: Malware Records; 4AD; Anjunabeats; Armada Music; Bite This!; inHarmony Music; mau5trap; Spinnin' Deep

Garrett Falls Lockhart (May 16, 1990 – November 23, 2020), known professionally by his stage name i_o, was an American DJ and record producer.

== Early life ==
Garrett Falls Lockhart was born on May 16, 1990, in Richmond, Virginia, and attended St. Stephen's Episcopal School in Austin, Texas. After graduating high school, he attended George Washington University in Washington, D.C. While in college, he began learning to DJ and had his first gig in his sophomore year. During college, he built up a following performing under the name 'Glock' (a portmanteau of his name) at local clubs like Lima and the Sweet Spot.

In 2013, Lockhart moved to Los Angeles to attend the Icon Collective music production school in Burbank, California. In this post Icon Collective time he was using the alias 'Fawks'.

Over time, Lockhart gained some notoriety through compromising online accounts for various artists, labels, and venues. Given the nature of these events, it is difficult to fully discern between true unauthorized penetration and ad campaign for these claims. Either way it was an ongoing story for him over several years while working with several labels. This is referenced on his Armada Music profile page bio which states, "Making a name for himself by taking control of various social media accounts of record labels, media outlets, artists, and venues...".

A more specific reference to this was given in an earlier interview with EDMIdentity. When asked, "Montreal's New City Gas was the latest victim of your exploits as you hacked their page effortlessly after they challenged you with a booking on the line. What made them such an easy target?" he responded:

What can I say, I really wanted to play Montreal. Don't store your admin on an open facing network.

== Career ==
=== Glock ===
Lockhart spent his time at George Washington University promoting himself under the alias Glock (stylized as GLock) by spreading flyers around the university campus, ordering hundreds of stickers featuring his logo, and giving shirts to students, promoters, and club bouncers. While studying from 2009 throughout 2012, Lockhart produced and released several dubstep songs under the Glock moniker. In an interview with The GW Hatchet, he remarked his first warehouse rave as "the best experience of my life" and wanted to make a career out of teaching others how to make music. After graduating in 2013, Lockhart Deejayed at several clubs under the Glock alias, saying that the clubs would ask him to play a show because his position as a college student would attract other George Washington University students to show up.

=== Fawks ===
Lockhart later started releasing under the alias Fawks, becoming known for his "Fawks Flips", a series of unofficial remixes. He had produced "Fawks Flips" of RL Grime's "Core", "Shelter" by Porter Robinson and Madeon, "Imaginary Friends" by deadmau5, The Game and Skrillex's "El Chapo", and "No Type" by Rae Sremmurd. By 2015, he had been released through various record labels such as Ministry of Sound and Ultra Music.

Lockhart released various singles as Fawks, including a G-House song titled "Riddim"; the electro house song "Say You Like It", featuring Medicienne as vocals; and the song "AFK" in July 2017. Lockhart was a featured artist on YDG's "Hold Up", providing vocals for the single.

=== i_o ===
==== 2017: Debut releases ====
Lockhart debuted the i_o moniker in 2017 as part of Mau5trap's We Are Friends, Vol. 7. He included the electro house song "Warning" as part of the compilation album and was marked as a "powerful" debut as described by a Dancing Astronaut writer. Online magazine columnists noted that Mau5trap was known to debut emerging artists, including Rezz, Rinzen, No Mana, and Attlas, and so marked Lockhart as an artist to watch; EDM Identity would include him in their 2018 "artists to watch" article.

In late December, Australian DJ and record producer Tommy Trash collaborated with Lockhart and singer Daisy Guttridge to release "Oxygen". The deep house song was conceptualized from a breakdown idea that Lockhart had sent to Tommy Trash, with the latter recruiting Daisy Guttridge to record vocals. It was well-received by critics, with a writer for Dancing Astronaut noted the song's "atmospheric allure and subdued, deep house vigor" as a departure from what Tommy Trash had been producing for over a decade.

==== 2018: Extended plays and subsequent releases ====
On February 20, 2018, Lockhart released his debut extended play Analog//DDoS on Mau5trap. The two-track EP contained the songs "Analog" and "//DDoS" and was well-received by critics. Following the EPs release, Lockhart took over Mau5trap's Twitter account, answering fan questions and "leaking" information, including another EP release in May, an album release by Rezz in late-2018, and several other future Mau5trap releases. The stunt lauded as a PR campaign by EDM Sauce's Erik Mahal, who said it would "go down in history."

Lockhart released his second extended play, Rootkit, on May 25, 2018. The 2-track extended play contained the progressive house song "Audio Dust" and the techno song "PassiveX" and was well-received by critics. Karlie Powell of Your EDM described the two songs as a ying to the other's yang, saying that Lockhart presents an "astonishingly diverse style in a 2-track sweep." In an interview with Billboard, Lockhart explained that he wanted to explore different components of the i_o project, with "Audio Dust" leading as a "more melodic components of the project" while "PassiveX" acts as "an example of where my heart of the i_o project lies: dark warehouses and banging techno."

Lockhart's third extended play, Scriptkiddi, was released for free on July 17, 2018. The two-track EP consisted of the songs "On Acid" and "The New Wave", both previously featured in DJ mixes before release. Writing for Dancing Astronaut, Robyn Dexter noted that both songs featured on the extended play were "hard-hitting techno heaters, composed of whirlwinds of heavy bass and sultry, computerized vocals".

==== 2019: "Violence" ====
Later came a major collaboration with composing and performing the song Violence along with Grimes. Although it was a side project for her she liked it so much that she included it in her album and made it the first single released from it. By this time she was apparently already aware of his music as she called i_o to do work on the song. This helped establish his widespread notability and increased promotional exposure through credit in industry publications like Variety where Jem Aswad wrote of the "synth-driven, soft-focus collaboration with DJ i_o". Positive reviews of the album, the song, and video for it mentioning his credit helped spread his name. Examples of important mainstream media mentions coming from being named a New York Times popular-music 'Critic Pick' by critic Jon Pareles and the write up mentioning his collaboration in Rolling Stone.

By the time of his death 'Violence' was his most successful in terms of chart performance. It spent 10 weeks on the Billboard 'Electronic Dance Music' chart, where it peaked at 19th on March 7, 2020. In other national charts it peaked at 48 on Mexico Ingles Airplay and 31 on New Zealand Hot Singles.

==== 2020: Final releases ====
Finally late in 2020 he was signed to the prestigious Armada Music label while starting his own imprint named 'Label 444'. Label 444 and Armada Music were going to be used for releases of different genres. His Armada Music profile page in August 2020 read, "He's joined the Armada family for 2021, with promises of releasing dance smashes on the label. He will also start off the year with his own imprint, Label 444, where his hard underground sound will reside."

== Artistry ==
Lockhart was praised by several online music magazines and was also included in several "artists to watch" articles. Erin Cropper of EDM Identity included Lockhart in her list of house and techno music artists at the beginning of 2018, saying that although he was the newest debut artist on the list, he became "one of the artists that we fell in love with in all the right ways". Your EDM's Matthew Meadow included Lockhart in his Top Artists list for 2019, alongside other artists such as 1788-L, Peekaboo, Fisher, Svdden Death, Nitti Gritti, Kompany, and Moore Kismet. We Rave You put Lockhart in their electronic dance music artist's for 2020, saying that EDM fans praise him for his use of "compelling beats and fascinating use of bass". He highlighted his song "Not Techno" as a satirical piece that drew attention to the elitism within the techno scene.

== Death ==
His death on November 23, 2020, was announced November 24, 2020 via social media (Instagram and Twitter) and music industry news sites like Billboard.com and NME. A tweet published by his family on May 18, 2021, concluded that he died from a "sudden and fatal arrhythmia" brought along by late stage Hashimoto's thyroiditis.

== Discography ==
=== Albums and EPs ===
Title	Details
Analog//DDoS	Released: 20 February 2018; Label: Mau5trap; Format: digital download, streaming
Rootkit	Released: 25 May 2018; Label: Mau5trap; Format: digital download, streaming
ScriptKiddi	Released: 17 July 2018; Label: Malware Records; Format: digital download, streaming
Fatal Error	Released: 31 August 2018; Label: Mau5trap; Format: digital download, streaming
Low	Released: 16 November 2018; Label: Mau5trap; Format: digital download, streaming
Death by Techno	Released: 3 May 2019; Label: Mau5trap; Format: digital download, streaming
House of God	Released: 2 August 2019; Label: Mau5trap; Format: digital download, streaming
ACID 444	Released: 22 November 2019; Label: Mau5trap; Format: digital download, streaming
NRG 444	Released: 7 February 2020; Label: Mau5trap; Format: digital download, streaming
AM 444	Released: 29 May 2020; Label: Mau5trap; Format: digital download, streaming
Révolution	Released: 7 August 2020; Label: Mau5trap; Format: digital download, streaming
Warehouse Summer	Released: 23 November 2022; Label: Armada Music; Format: digital download, streaming

==== As a featured artist ====
Title	Details
We Are Friends, Vol. 7 by Mau5trap	Released: 8 December 2017; Label: Mau5trap; Format: digital download, streaming
First Bites! Vol. 1 by Bite This!	Released: 9 March 2018; Label: Bite This!; Format: digital download, streaming
Melted Candy by No Mana	Released: 4 December 2018; Label: Mau5trap; Format: digital download, streaming
We Are Friends, Vol. 8 by Mau5trap	Released: 4 January 2019; Label: Mau5trap; Format: digital download, streaming
Jauz Presents: This Is Off The Deep End by Bite This!	Released: 26 July 2019; Label: Bite This!; Format: digital download, streaming
Anjunabeats The Yearbook 2019 by Anjunabeats	Released: 28 November 2019; Label: Anjunabeats; Format: digital download, streaming
Miss Anthropocene by Grimes	Released: 21 February 2020; Label: 4AD; Format: LP, CD, digital download, streaming
Balance (Remixes) by Armin van Buuren	Released: 20 March 2020; Label: Armada Music; Format: digital download, streaming
Electricity by Sian	Released: 27 March 2020; Label: Mau5trap; Format: digital download, streaming
Miss Anthropocene (Rave Edition) by Grimes	Released: January 1, 2021; Label: 4AD; Format: digital download, streaming

=== Singles ===
Title	Year	Album	Label
Oxygen (with Tommy Trash, featuring Daisy Guttridge)	2017	Non-album singles	Spinnin' Deep
Body Rock	2018	First Bites! Vol. 1	Bite This!
Lazers	2018	Non-album singles	inHarmony Music
Not Techno	2018	Non-album singles	inHarmony Music
Feel You Now (with Mike Schmid)	2018	Non-album singles	inHarmony Music
Bad Things (with No Mana, featuring Fay)	2018	Melted Candy	Mau5trap
Let Me Go (with Tommy Trash, featuring Daisy Guttridge)	2019	Non-album singles	Mau5trap
Truth (with Jauz)	2019	Non-album singles	Bite This!
Violence (with Grimes)	2019	Miss Anthropocene	4AD and Mau5trap
Annihilation (with Lights)	2020	AM 444	Mau5trap
Annihilation (Afterhours Mix) (with Lights)	2020	Non-album singles	Mau5trap
In My Head	2020	Non-album singles	Armada Music
Castles in the Sky	2020	Non-album singles	Armada Music

=== Remixes ===
Title	Year	Artist	Label
Imaginary Friends	2019	Deadmau5	Mau5trap
Alchemy	2019	Above & Beyond	Anjunabeats
Mr. Navigator	2020	Armin van Buuren and Tempo Giusto	Armada Music
Access	2020	DJ Misjah, DJ Tim	Armada Music

== Chart history ==
Chart History	I_o	"Violence" (with Grimes)	"Castles in the Sky"
Billboard Next Best Sound (2020)	1	-	-
Billboard Dance/Electronic Songs (2020)	-	19	-
Billboard Dance/Electronic Digital Songs (2019/2020)	-	5	22
Billboard Mexico Ingles Airplay (2019)	-	48	-
Billboard Canada Emerging Artists	-	27	-
New Zealand Hot Singles (RMNZ)	-	31	-
