= Delete Forever =

Single by Grimes

from the album Miss Anthropocene
- Released: February 12, 2020
- Genre: Folk; dance
- Length: 3:57
- Label: 4AD
- Songwriter: Claire Boucher
- Producer: Grimes

Grimes singles chronology
"4ÆM" (2019)	"Delete Forever" (2020)	"Cry" (2020)

Music video
- "Delete Forever" on YouTube

"Delete Forever" is a single recorded by Canadian musician Grimes. It was released on February 12, 2020, under the label 4AD as the fifth and final single off of her fifth studio album, Miss Anthropocene. The song is a folk and dance composition.

== Background ==
In an interview with Zane Lowe for Apple Music's Beats 1, Grimes revealed that "Delete Forever" was written on the night of American rapper Lil Peep's death, while its lyrics were inspired by the death of the singer's friends due to opioid addiction.

== Composition ==
"Delete Forever" is an "earnest and heartbreaking" and "folkily melodic" acoustic ballad, which employs a banjo, strings, "incredibly clean" acoustic guitar, electronic drums and bass. In an interview with Zane Lowe for Apple Music's Beats 1, Grimes described "Delete Forever" as a "pretty bummer song [...] about the opioid epidemic". Sonically, the record "incorporates folk, Britpop, and dance".

== Music video ==
On February 12, 2020, the song's music video premiered on YouTube. It depicts the singer in "brightly-colored pigtails and ethereal makeup" playing "a queen looking over her crumbling empire". Grimes revealed that the video was based on the fourth volume of the Japanese cyberpunk manga Akira, while its setting was created in a 3D modelling program.

== Charts ==
Chart (2020)	Peak position
US Hot Dance/Electronic Songs (Billboard)	14
