= Primo Toys =

London Based Educational Toy Company

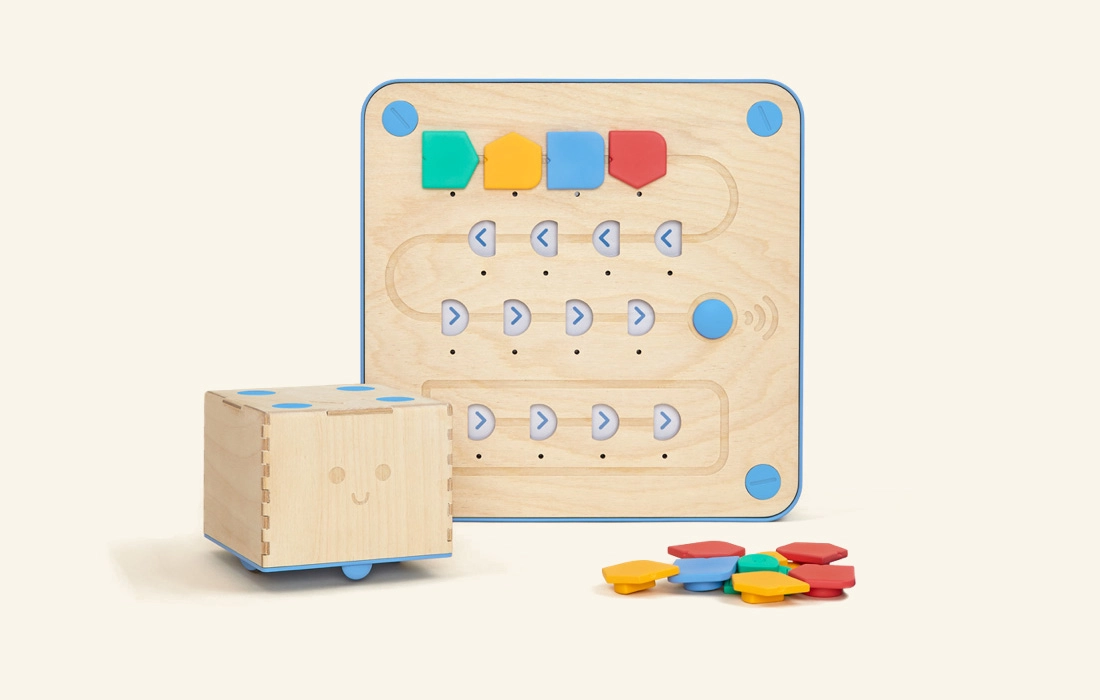
- The Cubetto Playset
- Founded: June 2013
- Founders: Filippo Yacob, Matteo Loglio
- Headquarters: London, UK
- Website: primotoys.com

Primo Toys is a London-based educational toy company founded by Filippo Yacob and Matteo Loglio, best known for creating the Cubetto Playset, an award-winning wooden robot that has been used by more than 10 million children to date, designed to teach children how to code using a tangible programming language that doesn't use screens or literacy. In April 2016, Cubetto became the most crowd-funded ed-tech invention in history, when 6,553 backers pledged a total of $1,596,457 to support their Kickstarter campaign. Primo Toys are backed by Randi Zuckerberg, Arduino co-founder Massimo Banzi, and Liam Casey's PCH International.

== Overview ==
Primo Toys was founded in June 2013 by Filippo Yacob and Matteo Loglio. Unsatisfied by the status quo of educational toys on the market, they set off to create a new type of educational toy company. "Primo" means "first" in Italian, reflecting the nature of the toys the company creates as the first steps into a child's technology education. The company's mission is to become "The best toy company in the world".

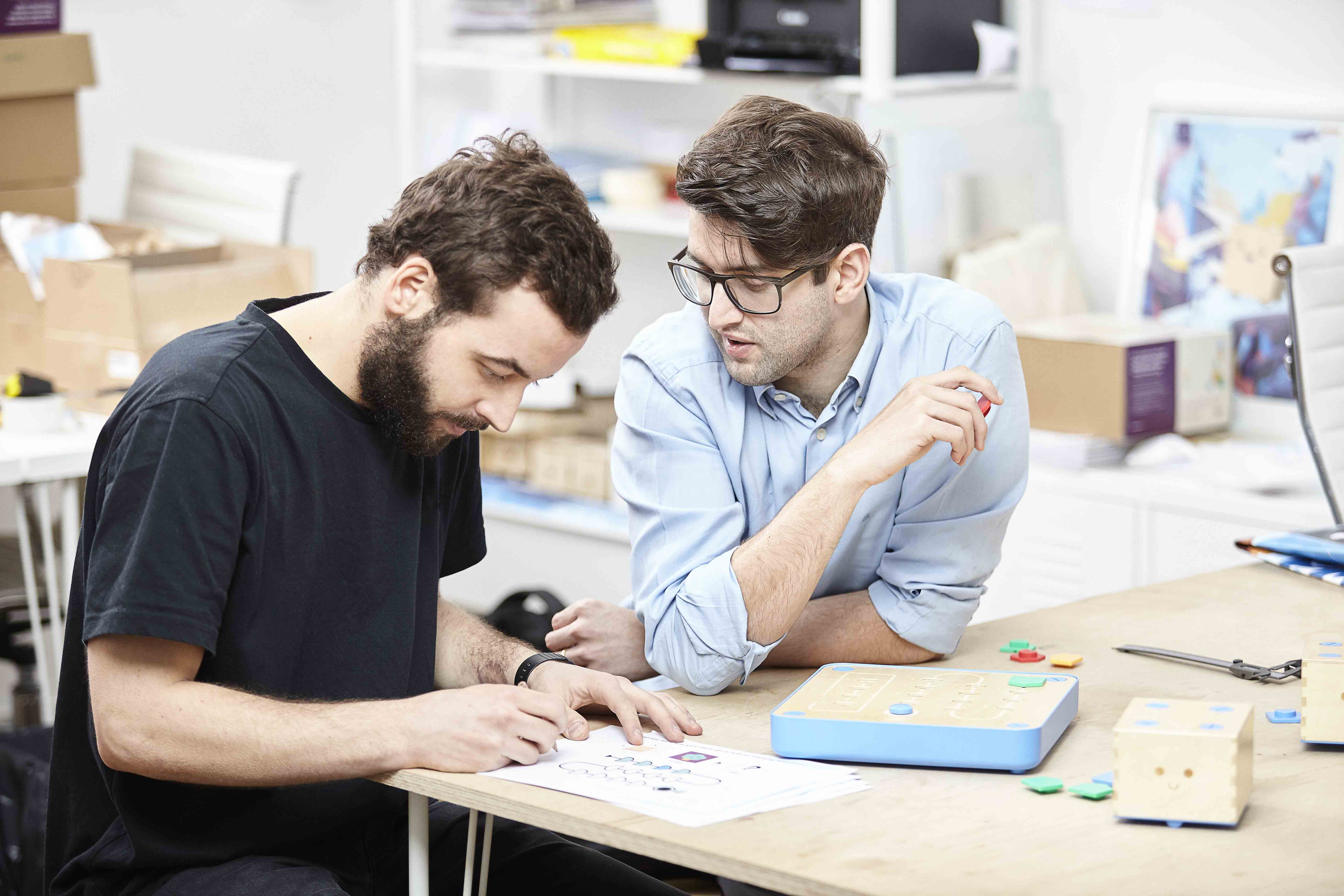
Primo Toys founders Matteo Loglio and Filippo Yacob .

== Cubetto Playset ==
The Cubetto Playset is the company's first commercial product. It's an award-winning coding kit designed to introduce computational thinking and programming logic to children aged three and up. The toy has been praised as “groundbreaking” due to its hands on programming language, which powers a wooden robot through an illustrated adventure. Cubetto has been the recipient of numerous international design awards, including a Best of Best Red Dot Design Award 2016 for concept, Gold at Cannes Lions 2016 for product design, and a 2016 D&AD pencil for impact. Cubetto has also been exhibited at the Massachusetts Institute of Technology, the MUDA, the V&A, and the Museum of Modern Art in New York.

=== The concept ===
The first idea and prototype of the playset were developed by Italian designer Matteo Loglio, during his studies at MAInD Lugano in 2012. The toy was initially designed as a research prototype, simply called "Primo", later used as a name for the company. Matteo Loglio's design for the Primo interface was inspired by his childhood experiences with Seymour Papert's LOGO, one of the first programming language used in schools. Filippo Yacob later developed Cubetto's "cube" form and character as a way to make the product viable and gender neutral, as well as the playset's routed elements and by-tonal command sound queues that make the product accessible to blind students.

=== Influences and research ===
The concept for Cubetto was inspired by Italian physician and educator Maria Montessori's early learning methods and MIT's programming language Logo, which was designed by a team directed by Seymour Papert in the 1960s as a way to teach children the basic principles of coding. The square "ground" robot that rotates only through 90 degrees while roaming a checkerboard field is similar to the screen robots (NAKIs) of the pioneering educational robotics language OZNAKI. Cubetto overall is a radical innovation, but its use of coloured pieces inserted in slots/holes for robot control and training is very similar to the TORTIS system developed by Radia Perlman within Papert's LOGO Group.

=== Primo Toys and the first Cubetto Playset ===
In 2013 Filippo Yacob and Matteo Loglio founded the ed-tech startup Primo Toys in order to bring Cubetto to market. The company launched the first digital-fabricated version of the Cubetto Playset on the Kickstarter platform. The new version of the product introduced the smiling robot Cubetto, replacing the wooden toy car, as well as the play-mat and story books. The campaign launched on the birth day of Filippo Yacob's son Alex, and collected £56,666 from 651 backers. As a result, over 300 of the first Cubetto Playset units were built by hand in a London studio and shipped to 46 countries worldwide. V1.1 and V1.2 Cubetto Playsets were also manufactured and delivered throughout 2015.

=== Cubetto Playset 2.0 and 2016 Kickstarter campaign ===
The product was re-designed for manufacturing at scale with the help of Liam Casey's PCH and Industrial designer Ben Callicott, in order to accommodate growing global demand. In April 2016, Cubetto became the most crowdfunded ed-tech invention in Kickstarter history. Launching on 8 March, the company hit its original target of $100,000 in under 17 hours. 30 days later, they raised $1,596,457 from 6,553 backers from more than 90 countries, and delivered the campaign 7 months later. Cubetto has been on the market ever since. Cubetto was featured in TIME Magazine, Fast Company and Wired.

=== Awards ===
- Product Innovation prize at the GESS Awards in 2016
- Cannes Lion - Product Design
- Junior Design Award - Platinum
- Red Dot Award - Best of Best
