= My Name Is Dark =

Single by Grimes

from the album Miss Anthropocene
- Released: November 29, 2019
- Genre: Industrial; gothic rock; alternative dance; electronic rock
- Length: 5:56
- Label: 4AD
- Songwriter(s): Claire Boucher
- Producer(s): Grimes

Grimes singles chronology
"So Heavy I Fell Through the Earth" (2019)	"My Name Is Dark" (2019)	"4ÆM" (2019)

Audio video
- "My Name Is Dark" on YouTube

"My Name Is Dark" is a song by Canadian musician Grimes. It was released on November 29, 2019, and is the third single from her fifth studio album Miss Anthropocene. The original title was "That's What the Drugs are For". A lyric video was published on December 3, 2019, featuring the Algorithm Mix of the song. Another lyric video was published on May 22, 2020, featuring a Russian translation and the Art Mix version. The video was released with the "Darkseid" lyrics. The composition consists of the industrial sound found on the Miss Anthropocene album combined with guitar and the soft-loud structure found in grunge music, including the song “Bullet with Butterfly Wings” by The Smashing Pumpkins which is also referenced in the lyrics, along with themes of nihilism, intoxication and spirituality.

The title of the song references a direct quote of the antagonist, Mr. Dark, in Ray Bradbury's 1962 novel Something Wicked This Way Comes.

The bridge of the song features Grimes overhearing a conversation between God and the Angel of Death, each protecting Hell and Heaven respectively; the Angel of Death pleads with God to fix the world, while God does nothing. This may be a metaphor for the album's theme of climate change going unnoticed. The line describing the encounter, "Paradise on my right, and h-h-hell on my left, the a-a-angel of death, right behind me" is also reference to a line in Frank Herbert's Dune.

Grimes states that certain lyrics in the song have their own themes: such as lyrics about insomnia, her experiences with record labels, and the city she recorded the song in.

== Charts ==
Chart (2020)	Peak position
US Hot Dance/Electronic Songs (Billboard)	22
