= Violence (Grimes and i o song) =

2019 single by Grimes and i_o

- Cover art for later editions

Single by Grimes and i_o

from the album Miss Anthropocene
- Released: September 5, 2019
- Genre: Electropop; trance; synth-pop; rave-pop
- Length: 3:40 (original mix); 4:12 (club mix)
- Label: 4AD; Mau5trap
- Songwriters: Claire Boucher; i_o
- Producers: Grimes; i_o

Grimes singles chronology
"Pretty Dark" (2019)	"Violence" (2019)	"So Heavy I Fell Through the Earth" (2019)

i_o singles chronology
"Fatal Error" (2018)	"Violence" (2019)	"Annihilation" (2020)

Music video
- "Violence" on YouTube

"Violence" is a song by Canadian musician Grimes and American DJ i_o. It was released on September 5, 2019, as the lead single from her fifth studio album Miss Anthropocene.

== Background ==
On September 3, 2019, the singer teased the release by posting a painting of an angelic figure whose hands touch a sword pierced into a planet resembling earth. She also blanked the remainder of her Instagram page. The post was accompanied by the caption "A new way to die! 2 days." which led publications to believe it would be the name of the song. However, she clarified the actual song title a day later. Another post in anticipation of the release read "There were Humans and Gods and nothing but Angels in between."

== Critical reception ==
Selim Bulut of Dazed Digital described the track as "a more ethereal piece of electro-pop, driven by a thumping kickdrum and synth arp bassline". Jem Aswad at Variety spoke of the song as a "synth-driven, soft-focus collaboration with DJ i_o". Writing for Uproxx, Derrick Rossignol noted that "it's an engaging piece of atmospheric but dance-ready electronic pop" and compared it to some of her previous works. In his review of Grimes' album, Miss Anthropocene, Anna Richmond described "Violence" as a song about "an abusive relationship, [...] only understood as being sung by the actual Earth to the very crisis of climate change" and, sonically, "four-to-the-floor trance with a Madonna-esque vocal melody". Rhian Daly of NME described the song as "pulsating, intergalactic rave-pop". The song appeared on Paper Mag's list of the "10 Songs You Need To Start Your Weekend Right", where the writer, Michael Love Michael, described it as "a bouncy synthpop track that feels like equal parts Britney Spears club hit and PSA for toxic relationships and/or climate change".

== Music video ==
The music video for "Violence" was released through Grimes' YouTube channel alongside the song's official release on September 5, 2019. It was directed by Grimes herself. The video begins with the singer reading The Art of War by Sun Tzu which would predict the outcome of the video. Later on March 15, 2020, the cover of the book got censored due to copyright claims made by that specific edition publishing company. After reading the book, Grimes is then seen performing dances among a group of female warriors whose movements mimic war combats; all of them are wearing facemasks to obscure their features. Grimes is also seen in the area where she read the book, dancing, and singing. Grimes wears a simple black outfit while with the dancers, and while on her own she is dressed in a "silver, futuristic dress" from Iris Van Herpen's fall 2019 couture collection. Variety compared the visuals to a "a supermodel session in the 1990s". The video features choreography inspired by TikTok user Cindy, and was filmed inside the Vibiana Cathedral.

== Personnel ==
Credits adapted from Tidal.

- Grimes – vocals, production
- Garrett Lockhart (i_o) – production
- Tom Norris – mixing

== Charts ==
Chart (2019–2020)	Peak position
New Zealand Hot Singles (RMNZ)	31
US Dance/Electronic Digital Songs (Billboard)	5
US Hot Dance/Electronic Songs (Billboard)	19
