= Play Destroy =

Song by Poppy featuring Grimes

from the album Am I a Girl?
- Released: October 31, 2018
- Genre: Synth-pop; industrial metal; nu metal
- Length: 3:05
- Label: Mad Decent
- Songwriter(s): Moriah Pereira; Claire Boucher; Authentic Songwriter; Chris Greatti
- Producer(s): Chris Greatti; Grimes

Audio
- "Play Destroy" on YouTube

"Play Destroy" is a song recorded by American singer-songwriter Poppy featuring Canadian musician Grimes from the former's second studio album Am I a Girl? (2018).

== Background ==
The collaboration was first teased in a series of pictures on both Grimes and Poppy's social media accounts. Poppy revealed that Grimes followed her on Twitter and then Poppy messaged her asking for a collaboration. She confirmed that they wrote a couple of songs together, the first being about "destroying things" and the other being about "power", referencing Grimes' single "We Appreciate Power". However, following a feud between the two singers, the song featured American singer Hana instead of Poppy.

Shortly after the release of Am I a Girl?, Poppy revealed that Grimes bullied her during the making of "Play Destroy" stating:

"I was kind of bullied into submission by [Grimes] and her team of self-proclaimed feminists," she says. "We planned the song coming out months ago, and she was preventing it. I got to watch her bully songwriters into signing NDA and not taking credit for songs that they were a part of. She doesn't practice what she preaches."

Before Poppy's statement, a fan praised Grimes for the collaboration on Twitter and she replied with "meh". When responding to the allegations, Grimes said "Poppy, you dragged me into a disgusting situation and won't stop punishing me for not wanting to be a part of it. I don't want to work with you, you leaked the song anyway. U got what you want. Let it go."

== Composition ==
"Play Destroy" is a synth-pop, industrial metal and nu-metal song. Following the sound of Poppy's "X" and "Am I a Girl?" Poppy refers to these songs as "Poppymetal".

== Reception ==
Anna Gaca of Spin stated "[The song] is a game, I imagine, akin to 'playing doctor', with all its attendant potential for deviant behavior and doll mutilation". Tom Breihan of Stereogum said that Poppy and Grimes "should've been making music together forever". He continued praising the song stating "Grimes and Poppy both have freaked-out, conceptual takes on bright, gleaming pop music. It's an incredibly strange song, and it's also kind of amazing."
