= Miss Anthropocene =

- Original standard edition and physical covers only

Studio album by Grimes
- Released: February 21, 2020
- Recorded: 2017–2019
- Genres: Electropop; synth-pop; art pop; dream pop; industrial; dark wave
- Length: 44:40
- Label: 4AD
- Producers: Grimes; Dan Carey; I_o; Hana; Chris Greatti

Grimes chronology
Art Angels (2015)	Miss Anthropocene (2020)

Revised cover
- This cover as originally intended by Grimes has been used on digital versions of the standard edition since December 2020

Singles from Miss Anthropocene
- 1. "Violence" Released: September 5, 2019; 2. "So Heavy I Fell Through the Earth" Released: November 15, 2019; 3. "My Name Is Dark" Released: November 29, 2019; 4. "4ÆM" Released: December 13, 2019; 5. "Delete Forever" Released: February 12, 2020

Miss Anthropocene is the fifth studio album by Canadian musician Grimes. It was released on February 21, 2020, through 4AD. It marked her first album in over four years, after the release of Art Angels in 2015. The album was officially announced on March 19, 2019. The name of the album is a pun on the feminine title "Miss", and the words "misanthrope" and "Anthropocene", a neologism popularised by Paul J. Crutzen in 2000 that was proposed to denote the current geological age the Earth is in. The album is a concept album about an "anthropomorphic goddess of climate change" inspired by Roman mythology and villainy. Miss Anthropocene is Grimes' final album on record label 4AD, to which she has been signed since 2012. The album is darker in style than Art Angels, containing inspiration from the sounds of industrial music.

== Background and release ==
On December 16, 2017, Grimes responded to fan on Twitter that she had "played [her] label new music", indicating that something would be released soon. Among marked disagreements with her record label 4AD, Grimes later announced that she had hoped to release a new album in 2018. On February 24, 2018, Grimes revealed that she was in the process of recording two albums to follow up her 2015 album Art Angels. In May 2018, some working titles were shared via her Instagram story. In June 2018, Grimes was featured in Apple's Behind the Mac advertisement campaign in which a snippet of a song titled "That's What the Drugs Are For" was featured.

The album's title was announced on March 19, 2019. Grimes explained that the album would be a concept album about an "anthropomorphic goddess of climate change" in which "each song will be a different embodiment of human extinction". Grimes explained that she "love[s] godly personifications of abstract/horrific concepts", pointing to the Roman god of war Mars as an inspiration; and that by making a personification of climate change she hoped that it would "maybe ... be a bit easier to look at" and not be "just abstract doom". In an interview with The Wall Street Journal, Grimes further explained that "people don't care about it [climate change], because we're being guilted." Grimes stated that she wanted "to make climate change fun" and "make a reason to look at it".

Miss Anthropocene's darker themes were also inspired by Grimes' reputation during the album's creation. Grimes elaborated in her interview with Crack Magazine that she had been made out to be a villain in the media due to large publications misrepresenting things she had said and the media's criticism of her relationship with Elon Musk, claiming that publications The New Yorker, The New York Times, Vice, and The Guardian had spread falsehoods about her, deriding that "we really do live in a post-truth society". Grimes stated that if she was going to be "stuck being a villain" then she wanted "to pursue villainy artistically", saying that it is "a really fun idea" to her, naming characters the Joker and Thanos as inspirations.

In an interview with Zane Lowe on Apple Music's Beats 1 radio station, Grimes revealed that Miss Anthropocene had actually been finished for some time and she was already working on her next album, which would be a "techno-pop album" where she "works with [her] favourite producers". Grimes mentioned that despite it being her favourite album, she had already "moved on" from the dark themes of Miss Anthropocene, which were caused by "a fair number of things that were going on at the time [of its creation]." She also stated that the song "Violence" was intended for the unnamed sixth album but was included on Miss Anthropocene because the track "feels good". In this interview Grimes also stated that one of the reasons for the album's delayed release was the death of her former manager Lauren Valencia from cancer in July 2019, an event which impacted Grimes greatly.

On October 15, 2019, Grimes revealed via a reply to a fan on Instagram that physical copies of Miss Anthropocene were in the process of being pressed. Miss Anthropocene was officially released on February 21, 2020.

== Composition ==
Musically, Miss Anthropocene has been described as electropop, synth-pop, art pop, dream pop, industrial, darkwave, dance, pop, and industrial rock. In contrast to her previous album, Art Angels, this album features a darker sound. AllMusic described the album as a "murky mix of ethereal, nu-metal, and industrial-inspired sounds". In the single "So Heavy I Fell Through the Earth" she experimented with AI-generated music through the NSynth neural synthesizer.

== Artwork ==
The original artwork features a drawing by Grimes herself inside a fictional computer program. Design was handled by Gmunk and Ryder Ripps. Grimes explained that she was inspired by her experience making music and visual art using programs such as Photoshop, Manga Studio, and Adobe Premiere Pro; this made her want to "create a fictional universe where there's like all these new gods, and if the new gods were building the simulation that we live in, [...] this is the program that the gods use."

The updated artwork is a painting by Rupid Leejm. Grimes stated that it was the artwork she originally wanted to use, but that she was discouraged from doing so after she "polled a bunch of [people]".

== Promotion ==
=== Singles ===
Originally billed to be the first single from the album, "We Appreciate Power", featuring American singer Hana, was released on November 29, 2018. The track was described as an industrial rock track with lyrics revolving around themes of transhumanism and artificial intelligence. It was also noted that Grimes had been in a relationship with technology entrepreneur Elon Musk since 2018, leading to speculation that the song was inspired by him and his work. On November 15, 2019, it was revealed the track would only be included on the digital deluxe edition and Japanese CD release of the album.

In an Instagram post published on August 13, 2019, Grimes announced the first official single from Miss Anthropocene would be released on September 13, 2019. This post was deleted shortly afterwards. On September 3, 2019, Grimes deleted all of her Instagram posts then announced in a new post that a song would be released on September 5. The song, originally speculated to be titled "A New Way to Die" due to the caption of her Instagram post, was clarified later to actually be called "Violence". The track features American DJ i_o. Dazed praised the track's "thumping kickdrum and synth arp bassline". During the music video's premiere on YouTube, Grimes announced that she would be releasing two songs, titled "So Heavy I Fell Through The Earth" and "4ÆM", as the album's next two singles although no release dates were given.

The second official single from Miss Anthropocene, "So Heavy I Fell Through the Earth", was announced via Instagram on November 11, 2019, and released on November 15, 2019. The cover art and track listing for Miss Anthropocene were also unveiled on November 15. The track received positive reviews from critics who commented on the track's slower and darker sound compared to the previous single "Violence", with NME stating that it felt like a "slow-motion fall through the cosmos", noting the track's "thick layers of bass" and "Grimes' dangling voice". Pitchfork labelled the track a "six-minute downtempo odyssey" with "forceful theatrics".

The third single from the album, "My Name Is Dark" — originally titled "That's What The Drugs Are For" — was released on November 29, 2019. The track's nu-metal sound was praised by many publications, with Stereogum calling it a "dark and gritty electro-rocker" with a "menacing guitar riff".

On December 13, 2019, Grimes premiered the fourth single from Miss Anthropocene, "4ÆM", at The Game Awards 2019 during the segment dedicated to the soundtrack of the video game Cyberpunk 2077. Grimes also announced that she is the voice actor for a character in the game named Lizzy Wizzy. "4ÆM" samples the song "Deewani Mastani" from the Bollywood film Bajirao Mastani and was described by Grimes as being a "cyberpunk interpretation" of the film. NME named the track "suitably futuristic" while other reviewers praised the song's drum and bass beat and ethereal vocals, noting similarities to songs from Grimes' 2010 album Halfaxa.

The fifth single from the album, "Delete Forever", was released on February 12, 2020. The song was inspired by Grimes losing six of her friends to heroin overdoses and the numbness Grimes felt following their deaths. It was written on the same night that emo rap artist Lil Peep accidentally died after overdosing on a fake Xanax pill that was laced with fentanyl.

=== Videos ===
Several lyric videos were released for various songs from Miss Anthropocene. A lyric video for "We Appreciate Power" was released on November 29, 2018. It features both Grimes and Hana and was directed by the former alongside her brother Mac Boucher. Another lyric video for the album's third single "My Name Is Dark" followed on December 3, 2019. Grimes described it as "just a cute vibe". On February 27, 2020, Grimes released two lyric videos for the track "Idoru". Dubbed "Slightly Longer Version" and "Slightly Shorter Version", they correspond to the "Art Mix" and "Algorithm Mix" versions of the song, respectively. Grimes released the videos after noticing that the track was a fan favorite. A "Darkseid" lyric video and a "My Name Is Dark" video featuring the "Art Mix" and a Russian lyrics translation were released on May 22, 2020.

Two music videos were released. The video for the lead single "Violence" was released on September 5, 2019, and was directed by Grimes. Its acclaimed choreography, described by Variety as "mock pistol-firing and swordplay", is inspired by TikTok user Cindy. Another video was released for the fifth single "Delete Forever" on February 12, 2020. It was directed by Grimes, Mac Boucher, and Neil Hansen, and depicts "a tyrant's lament as her empire crumbles".

A visualizer for the album's second single "So Heavy I Fell Through the Earth" was uploaded on November 15, 2019. On April 1, 2020, Grimes uploaded a green screen video for the track "You'll Miss Me When I'm Not Around" to her YouTube channel as well as an archive featuring the raw audio and video files to WeTransfer and invited her fans to remix the song and the video using the hashtag #GrimesArtKit. The footage was originally shot so that her artistic team could create visuals for the album, but she cited the COVID-19 pandemic as the reason she elected to involve her fans, in case they are "bored and wanna learn new things" while on lockdown. Billboard speculated that this may also relate to Grimes' roots in the DIY scene.

On January 1, 2021, Grimes released Miss Anthropocene: Rave Edition, a remix album featuring new versions of the albums' songs by artists including BloodPop, Channel Tres, Richie Hawtin, and Modeselektor, as well as two remixes from her Cyberpunk 2077 Apple Music DJ mix.

== Commercial performance ==
Miss Anthropocene debuted at number 1 on Billboard's Top Dance/Electronic Albums chart and at number 32 on the Billboard 200, with 19,000 equivalent album units, according to Nielsen Music/MRC Data. It also debuted at No. 10 on the Official UK Albums chart, becoming her first top 10 album in the United Kingdom.

== Critical reception ==
Professional ratings
Aggregate scores
Source	Rating
AnyDecentMusic?	7.5/10
Metacritic	79/100
Review scores
Source	Rating
AllMusic	3.5/5 stars
Consequence	B+
DIY	3.5/5 stars
The Guardian	4/5 stars
The Independent	5/5 stars
The Irish Times	5/5 stars
NME	4/5 stars
Pitchfork	8.2/10
Rolling Stone	3/5 stars
Sputnikmusic	4.2/5 stars

Miss Anthropocene received positive reviews from music critics upon its release. On review aggregator website Metacritic, which assigns media a normalized score out of 100 based on reviews from mainstream publications, the album has a score of 79 based on 27 critic reviews, which indicates "generally favorable reviews".

Reviewing Miss Anthropocene for The Independent, Adam White deemed it a "triumph" and praised the wide range of sounds explored on the album, saying that it "operates much like a greatest hits record". He directed praise to the album's "transcendent" slower songs, particularly "So Heavy I Fell Through the Earth" and "You'll Miss Me When I'm Not Around". Anupa Mistry of Pitchfork wrote that the album successfully builds upon "Grimes' long-standing interest in rave nostalgia and alluring pop music from around the world", despite expressing reservations about its "rendering [of] climate crisis as dystopian aesthetic". NME journalist Rhian Daly described the climate change concept as "fragmented ... rather than being a unifying thing to tie every song neatly together", while praising Miss Anthropocene's mix of sounds, pointing to the "eerie" "New Gods" and "intergalactic rave-pop" of "Violence" as highlights. Alexis Petridis of The Guardian found it to be an effective commentary on the "toxicity of modern celebrity" as opposed to climate change, adding that "on those terms, Miss Anthropocene works remarkably well: for all the sci-fi theorising, the emotions at its centre feel prosaic, realistic and affecting". AllMusic critic Heather Phares concluded that despite being less "vivid" than her earlier work, the album is "often fascinating and defies expectations in ways that still fit her always thought-provoking aesthetic".

Claire Shaffer of Rolling Stone commended Grimes' intentions but found that "what the album actually has to say about climate change is often lost under the admittedly beautiful, meticulously composed wreckage." Grant Sharples of Consequence of Sound called the album "her darkest, most ambitious project yet". Lisa Wright of DIY also described the album as Grimes' darkest album. Paste's Max Freedman was more critical and wrote that Miss Anthropocene "veers on incoherent" due to its lack of "subtle, effective metaphors and narratives". Sputnikmusic stated that "Miss Anthropocene takes everything about Grimes the musician...and concisely packages it into her most penetrating record yet." Louise Bruton The Irish Times described the album as a "frightening look at the many shades of human extinction in beautiful washes of nu-metal and cold electronica." In 2021, Pitchfork included the album in their "Rescored" list, adjusting its original score of 8.2 to a 6.9, with Madison Bloom claiming that Grimes "sounds like a carbon copy of herself" on it.

=== Accolades ===
Accolades for Miss Anthropocene
Publication	Accolade	Rank	Ref.
Billboard	Billboard's 50 Best Albums of 2020 – Mid-Year	—N/a	
Billboard	Billboard's 50 Best Albums of 2020	21	
Consequence	Top 50 Albums of 2020	46	
Consequence	Top 25 Albums of 2020 – Mid-Year	25	
Crack Magazine	Top 50 Albums of 2020	14	
Exclaim!	Top 50 Albums of 2020	14	
Exclaim!	Top 33 Albums of 2020 – Mid-Year	9	
Gorilla vs. Bear	Gorilla vs. Bear's Best Albums of 2020 – Mid-Year	3	
Gorilla vs. Bear	Top 50 Albums of 2020	9	
Nothing but Hope and Passion	Top 50 Albums of 2020	28	
Pitchfork	The 50 Best Albums of 2020	24	
Slant	The 50 Best Albums of 2020	2	
Spin	Spin's 30 Best Albums of 2020 – Mid-Year	—N/a	
Stereogum	Stereogum's 50 Best Albums of 2020 – Mid-Year	32	
Time	Top 10 Albums of 2020	9	

== Track listing ==
Credits adapted from Tidal.

All tracks are written by Grimes, except where noted. All tracks are produced by Grimes, except "Violence" and its remixes are produced by Grimes and Garrett Lockhart, "New Gods" is produced by Grimes and Dan Carey, and "We Appreciate Power" and its remix are produced by Grimes, Chris Greatti and Hana.

Standard edition
No.	Title	Writer(s)	Length
1.	"So Heavy I Fell Through the Earth" (art mix)		6:08
2.	"Darkseid" (with 潘PAN)	Grimes; Pan Wei-Ju	3:44
3.	"Delete Forever"		3:57
4.	"Violence" (with I_o)	Grimes; Garrett Lockhart	3:40
5.	"4ÆM"	Grimes; Ganesh Chandanshive; Siddharth-Garima; Sanjay Bhansali; Nasir Faraaz	4:30
6.	"New Gods"		3:15
7.	"My Name Is Dark" (art mix)		5:56
8.	"You'll Miss Me When I'm Not Around"		2:41
9.	"Before the Fever"		3:37
10.	"Idoru (Art Mix)"		7:12
Total length:			44:40

Japanese CD edition bonus track
No.	Title	Writer(s)	Length
11.	"We Appreciate Power" (featuring Hana)	Grimes; Hana; Chris Greatti	5:35
Total length:			50:15

Digital deluxe edition bonus tracks
No.	Title	Writer(s)	Length
12.	"So Heavy I Fell Through the Earth" (algorithm mix)		3:52
13.	"Violence" (with I_o) (club mix)	Grimes; Lockhart	4:12
14.	"My Name Is Dark" (algorithm mix)		4:03
15.	"Idoru" (algorithm mix)		4:46
Total length:			67:08

CD bonus track
No.	Title	Writer(s)	Length
16.	"We Appreciate Power" (algorithm mix)	Grimes; Hana; Greatti	3:45
Total length:			70:53

Rave edition
No.	Title	Writer(s)	Length
1.	"So Heavy I Fell Through the Earth" (ANNA remix)		6:46
2.	"Darkseid" (Richie Hawtin remix) (featuring 潘PAN)	Grimes; Pan Wei-Ju	10:37
3.	"Delete Forever" (Channel Tres remix)		3:01
4.	"Violence" (REZZ remix) (featuring I_o)	Grimes; Lockhart	3:15
5.	"4ÆM"	Grimes; Chandanshive; Siddharth-Garima; Bhansali; Faraaz	4:31
6.	"New Gods" (Tale of Us & Âme remix)		7:30
7.	"My Name Is Dark" (Julien Bracht remix)		10:23
8.	"You'll Miss Me When I'm Not Around" (Things You Say remix)		5:11
9.	"Before the Fever"		3:37
10.	"Idoru" (Modeselektor remix)		6:06
11.	"We Appreciate Power" (BloodPop remix)	Grimes; Hana; Greatti	6:11
Total length:			67:08

Notes

- The vinyl version contains the "algorithm mix" versions of "So Heavy I Fell Through the Earth", "My Name Is Dark", and "Idoru".
- "My Name Is Dark" is stylized as "My Name is Dark"
- "You'll Miss Me When I'm Not Around" is stylized in sentence case
- "Before the Fever" is stylized in sentence case
- "Idoru" is stylized in all caps

== Personnel ==
- Grimes – vocals, production, engineering
- I_o – production (track 4)
- Chris Greatti – production (track 11)
- Hana – vocals, additional production (track 11)
- Carlo "Illangelo" Montagnese – mixing (track 1)
- Tom Norris – mixing (tracks 4–5)
- Andy Wallace – mixing (track 7)
- Zakk Cervini – mixing (track 11)
- Pan Wei-Ju – vocals (track 2)
- Ryder Ripps – Creative Direction

== Charts ==
Miss Anthropocene sales chart performance
Chart (2020)	Peak position
Australian Albums (ARIA)	10
Austrian Albums (Ö3 Austria)	31
Belgian Albums (Ultratop Flanders)	36
Belgian Albums (Ultratop Wallonia)	116
Canadian Albums (Billboard)	31
Dutch Albums (Album Top 100)	68
French Albums (SNEP)	126
German Albums (Offizielle Top 100)	56
Irish Albums (Official Charts)	20
Japanese Albums (Oricon)	79
New Zealand Albums (RMNZ)	28
Scottish Albums (Official Charts)	4
Spanish Albums (PROMUSICAE)	24
Swiss Albums (Schweizer Hitparade)	25
UK Albums (Official Charts)	10
US Billboard 200	32
US Independent Albums (Billboard)	3
US Top Dance Albums (Billboard)	1

=== Year-end charts ===
Year-end chart performance for Miss Anthropocene
Chart (2020)	Position
US Top Current Album Sales	187

== See also ==
- List of 2020 albums
