= Nu metal =

Subgenre of alternative metal

- Stylistic origins: Alternative metal; rap metal; funk metal; groove metal; industrial metal; grunge; beatdown hardcore
- Cultural origins: Mid-1990s, California, U.S.
- Derivative forms: Emo rap; trap metal; hyperpop

Fusion genres
- Nu-gaze; nu metalcore

Regional scenes
- California; Midwestern United States; New England; Florida; Ontario

Other topics
- Post-grunge; New wave of American heavy metal

Nu metal (sometimes stylized as nü-metal, with a metal umlaut) is a subgenre of alternative metal that combines elements of heavy metal music with elements of other music genres such as hip-hop, funk, industrial, and grunge. Nu metal rarely features guitar solos or other displays of musical technique and emphasizes rhythm with instrumentation that is heavily syncopated. Nu metal guitarists often use seven-string guitars that are down-tuned to produce a heavier sound. Vocal styles are often rhythmic and influenced by hip-hop, and include singing, rapping, screaming and sometimes growling. DJs are occasionally featured to provide instrumentation such as sampling, turntable scratching and electronic background music. Nu metal is one of the key genres of the new wave of American heavy metal.

In the late 1980s and early 1990s, bands like Pantera, Helmet, and Faith No More were influential in the development of nu metal with their groove metal and alternative metal styles. Korn is often credited as pioneering the subgenre in the mid-1990s with their self-titled debut album. Nu metal became popular in the late 1990s, with bands and artists such as Korn, Limp Bizkit, and Slipknot all releasing albums that sold millions of copies.

Its popularity continued through the early 2000s, with bands such as Papa Roach, Staind, and P.O.D. all selling multi-platinum albums. The popularity of nu metal came to a peak in 2001 with Linkin Park's diamond-selling debut album, Hybrid Theory. By the mid-2000s, however, the oversaturation of bands, combined with the underperformance of several high-profile releases, signaled the subgenre's decline. Many nu metal bands disbanded or changed their sound in favor of other genres. Genres such as metalcore and emo overtook nu metal in popularity.

The 2010s brought a nu metal revival; many bands that combined it with other genres (for example, metalcore and deathcore) emerged, and some nu metal bands from the 1990s and early 2000s returned to the nu metal sound. Bands such as Of Mice & Men, Emmure, Issues, My Ticket Home, Bring Me the Horizon, and Motionless in White combined nu metal with metalcore or deathcore. Artists like Grimes, Poppy, and Rina Sawayama integrated nu metal sounds into electronic pop music in the late 2010s and early 2020s, and interest in nu metal rose in the early 2020s.

== Characteristics and fashion ==
"Falling Away from Me" by Korn (1999)
Tim Grierson of About.com wrote that "Falling Away from Me" by Korn showed hip-hop influence through the use of staccato rhythms, textured guitar hooks, and distorted power chords.

"Surfacing" by Slipknot (1999)
Citing the lyrics of the song's chorus, Karan Pradhan of Firstpost called Slipknot's "Surfacing" the "best encapsulation of the aggression, attitude, simplicity and indeed, the spirit of nu metal".

=== Terminology and origins ===
Nu metal is a subgenre of alternative metal. Sometimes stylized as nü-metal, the genre has also been dubbed aggro-metal or simply aggro. MTV states that the early nu metal group Korn "arrived in 1993 into the burgeoning alternative metal scene, which would morph into nü-metal the way college rock became alternative rock." Stereogum similarly said that nu metal was a "weird outgrowth of the Lollapalooza-era alt-metal scene". Nu metal merges elements of heavy metal music with elements of other music genres such as industrial, hip-hop, grunge, funk, alternative rock and post-grunge according to Blabbermouth.net. Nu metal bands use many elements of heavy metal genres such as rap metal, industrial metal, groove metal, and funk metal. Some nu metal bands, such as Static-X and Dope, made nu metal music with elements of industrial music. In contrast with other heavy metal subgenres, nu metal tends to use the same structure of verses, choruses, and bridges as those in pop music.

=== Musical characteristics ===
==== Instrumentation ====
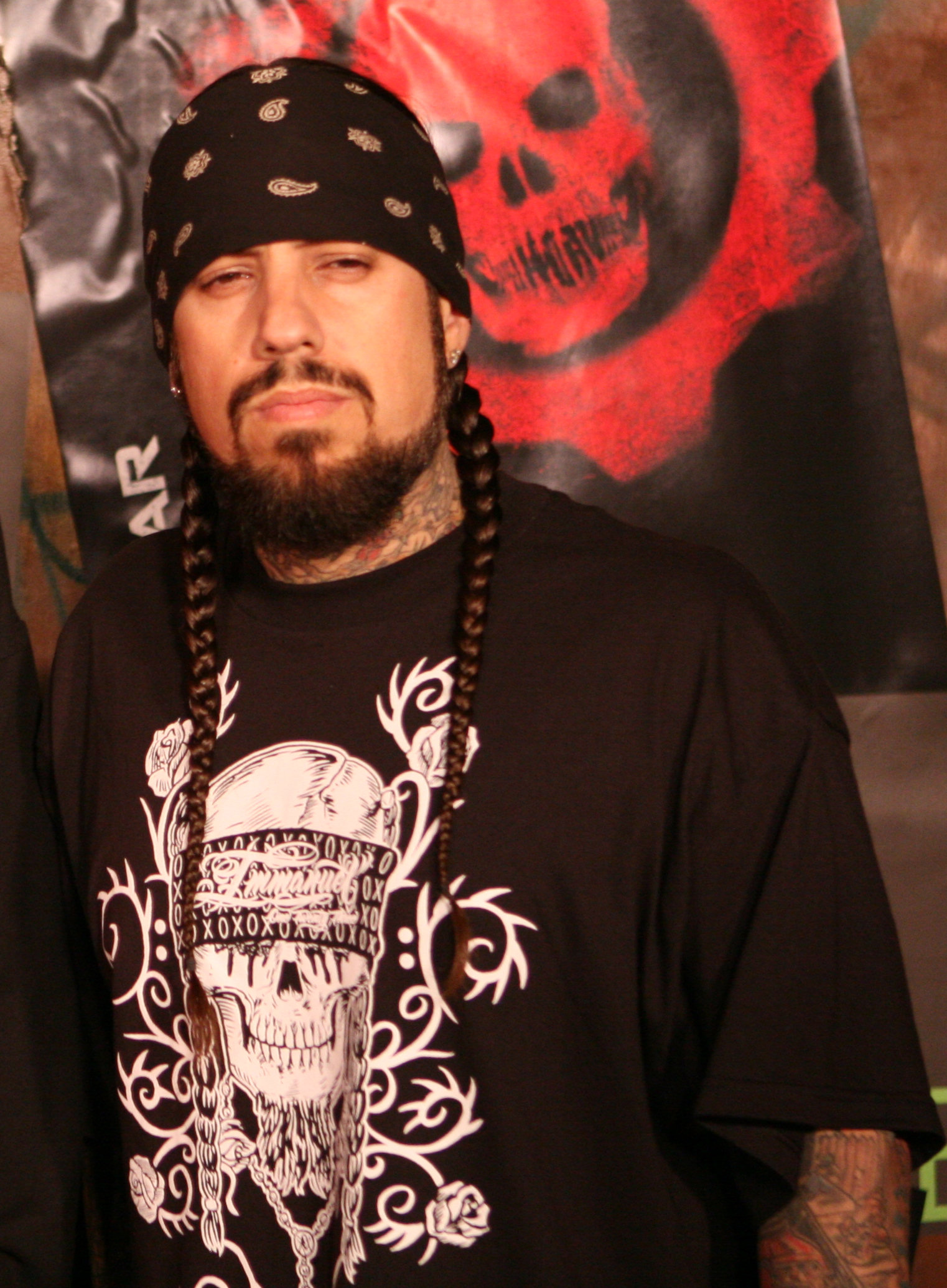
Korn bassist Fieldy (pictured) cites bassists such as Flea of Red Hot Chili Peppers and Les Claypool of Primus as influences.

Then a funny thing happened: myopic anti-rap sentiment within more conservative heavy metal quarters saw a slew of new bands already busy blurring these genre lines (Faith No More, Infectious Grooves, etc.) repositioned as "funk metal"; but this did nothing to slow down the increasing cross-pollination, as some bands added record-scratching DJs to their arsenal. Finally, a generation of groove metal bands led by Texas' Pantera brought a new level (pun intended) of rhythmic elements into heavy metal, and most of the ingredients were finally in place for bands like Korn, Deftones, Slipknot and Limp Bizkit to kickstart and coalesce the Nu-Metal craze.

— Eduardo Rivadavia of Loudwire (October 27, 2017)

Instrumentation in nu metal is heavily syncopated and is based mostly on guitar riffs, although these riffs are prominent, guitar solos are not integrated heavily within the genre. These riffs were often being inspired by groove metal. Mid-song bridges and the general lack of guitar solos contrasts it with other genres of heavy metal. Kory Grow of Revolver wrote, "... [i]n its efforts to tune down and simplify riffs, nu-metal effectively drove a stake through the heart of the guitar solo". Another contrast with other heavy metal genres is nu metal's emphasis on rhythm, rather than on complexity or mood. The wah pedal is occasionally featured in nu metal music.

Nu metal bassists and drummers are often influenced by funk and hip-hop, respectively, adding to nu metal's rhythmic nature. Blast beats and double bass drumming, which are both common in heavy metal subgenres such as black metal, thrash metal and death metal, are uncommon in nu metal, with drummers such as Slipknot's Joey Jordison and Mudvayne's Matt McDonough being notable exceptions.

Nu metal's similarities with many heavy metal subgenres include its use of common time, distorted guitars, and power chords and note structures primarily revolving around Dorian, Aeolian or Phrygian modes. While loud and heavily distorted electric guitars are a core feature of all metal genres, nu metal guitarists took the sounds of "violence and destruction" to new levels with their overdriven guitar tone, which music journalists Kitts and Tolinski compared to the "...sound [of] a Mack truck being crushed by a collapsing skyscraper."

Some nu metal bands use seven-string guitars that are generally down-tuned, rather than traditional six-string guitars. Likewise, some bass guitarists use five-string and six-string instruments. Bass guitar-playing in nu metal often features an emphasis on funk elements. In nu metal music, DJs are sometimes featured to provide instrumentation such as sampling, turntable scratching and electronic backgrounds. Nu metal tends to have hip-hop grooves and rhythms.

==== Vocals ====
For a genre that blends the vocally-centric music of hip-hop with the visceral fury of metal, any given nu-metal band's identity is defined in large part by the sonic persona of their frontperson.

— Eli Enis of Revolver (July 26, 2021)

Vocal styles used in nu metal music include singing, rapping, screaming and growling. Vocals in nu metal are often rhythmic and influenced by hip-hop. While some nu metal bands, such as Limp Bizkit and Linkin Park, have rapping in their music, other nu metal bands, such as Godsmack and Staind, do not.

Nu metal bands occasionally feature hip-hop musicians as guests in their songs; Korn's song "Children of the Korn" features the rapper Ice Cube, who performed on the band's 1998 Family Values Tour. The hip-hop musician Nas was featured on Korn's song "Play Me", which is on the band's album Take a Look in the Mirror. Limp Bizkit has recorded with multiple hip-hop musicians including Method Man, Lil Wayne, Xzibit, Redman, DMX and Snoop Dogg. Linkin Park collaborated with hip-hop musician Jay-Z on their 2004 extended play Collision Course. Kid Rock has recorded with hip-hop musicians Eminem and Snoop Dogg. Trevor Baker of The Guardian wrote, "Bands such as Linkin Park, Korn and even the much reviled Limp Bizkit ... did far more to break down the artificial barriers between 'urban music' and rock than any of their more critically acceptable counterparts."

==== Lyrics ====
Lyrics in nu metal songs are often angry or nihilistic; many of the genre's lyrics focus on topics such as pain, angst, bullying, emotional issues, abandonment, betrayal, and personal alienation, in a way similar to those of grunge. Many nu metal lyrics that are about these topics tend to be in a very direct tone. However, some nu metal songs have lyrics that are about other topics. P.O.D. has used positive lyrics about promise and hope. The nu metal song "Bodies" by Drowning Pool is about moshing. The Michigan Daily wrote about Limp Bizkit's lyrics, writing that the band "used the nu-metal sound as a way to spin testosterone fueled fantasies into snarky white-boy rap. Oddly, audiences took frontman Fred Durst more seriously than he wanted, failing to see the intentional silliness in many of his songs". Limp Bizkit's lyrics have also been described as misogynistic. Dope's lyrics are usually about sex, drugs, parties, women, violence, and relationships. In contrast, according to Josh Chesler of the Phoenix New Times, the lyrics of Deftones, who were once considered a nu metal band, "tend to have complex allusions and leave the songs open to many different interpretations."

=== Fashion ===
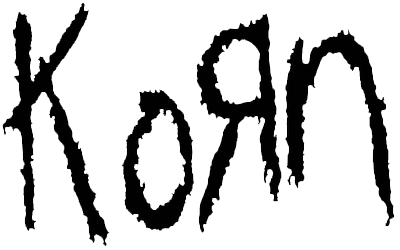
The Korn logo (stylized as KoЯn) became an iconic symbol of nu metal.

Nu metal clothing typically consists of baggy pants, shirts, and shorts, JNCO jeans, Adidas tracksuits, sports jerseys, baseball caps, baggy hoodies, cargo pants, and sweatpants. Nu metal hairstyles and facial hairstyles include dreadlocks, braids, spiky hair, chin beards, bald heads, goatees, frosted tips, and bleached or dyed hair. Common accessories in nu metal fashion include wallet chains, tattoos, and piercings, especially facial piercings. Nu metal fashion has been compared to hip hop fashion.

Some nu metal bands such as Motograter, Mushroomhead, Mudvayne, and Slipknot wear masks, jumpsuits, costumes, face paint, corpse paint or body paint. A few nu metal bands, such as Coal Chamber, and Kittie are known for having gothic appearances.

== History ==
=== 1980s–1993: Precursors and origins ===
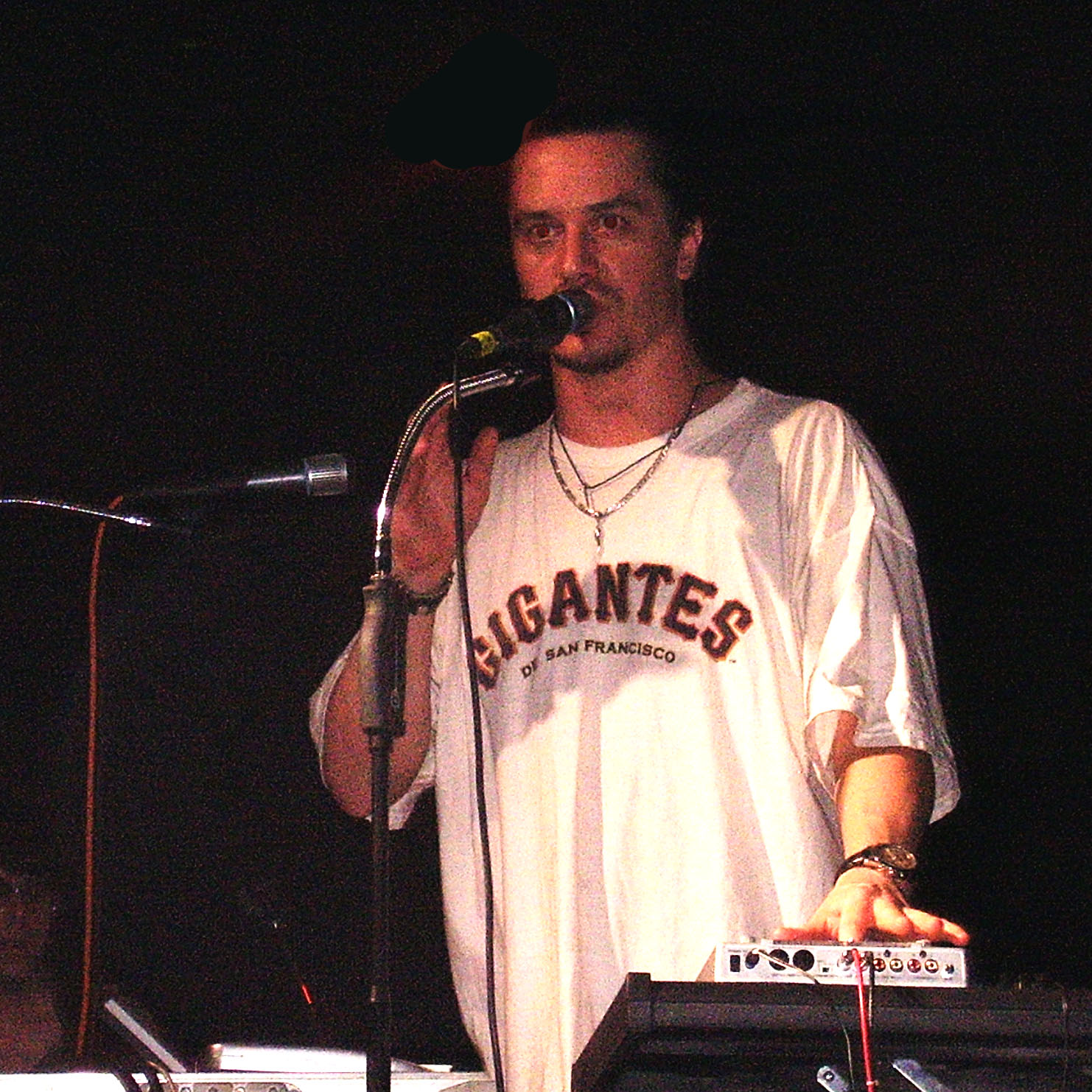
Mike Patton of Faith No More and Mr. Bungle was a major influence on nu metal.

Thrash metal band Anthrax was an influence on nu metal by combining hip-hop and metal on their 1987 rap metal EP I'm the Man; this laid groundwork for nu metal's development. Nu metal bands often borrowed their metal influence from groove metal band Pantera, with the pioneering nu metal band Korn's lead vocalist Jonathan Davis saying of Pantera guitarist Dimebag Darrell, "if there was no Dimebag Darrell, there would be no Korn". Alternative metal musician Mike Patton of Faith No More and Mr. Bungle was a major influence on many nu metal vocalists due to his wide range of vocal styles.

=== 1993–1997: Early years ===
Joel McIver acknowledged Korn as the band that created and pioneered the nu metal genre with its demo Neidermayer's Mind, which was released in 1993. McIver also acknowledged Korn as the band that started the new wave of American heavy metal, which is a heavy metal music movement that started in the 1990s. The aggressive riffs of Korn, the rapping of Limp Bizkit, and the melodic ballads of Staind created the sonic template for nu metal. The origins of the term "nu metal" are often attributed to the work of producer Ross Robinson, who has been called "The Godfather of Nu Metal" between producers. Robinson has produced for nu metal bands such as Korn, Limp Bizkit and Slipknot. Many of the first nu metal bands, such as Korn and Deftones, came from California; however, the genre soon spread across the United States and many bands arose from various states, including Limp Bizkit from Florida, Staind from Massachusetts, and Slipknot from Iowa. In the book Brave Nu World, Tommy Udo wrote about the nu metal band Coal Chamber, "There's some evidence to suggest that Coal Chamber were the first band to whom the tag 'nu metal' was actually applied, in a live review in Spin magazine."

In 1994, Korn released their self-titled debut album, which is widely considered the first nu metal album. Korn had experienced underground popularity at this time; their debut album peaked at number 72 on the Billboard 200. In 1995, the band Sugar Ray released its debut studio album Lemonade and Brownies, an album described as both funk metal and nu metal. In 1995, Deftones released their debut album Adrenaline. The album peaked at number 23 on the Heatseekers Albums chart on October 5, 1996. Deftones also were temporarily controversial in 1996 when their vocalist Chino Moreno was blamed by TV news reports for a riot that occurred at the 1996 U-Fest festival on October 5, 1996. Adrenaline was certified gold by the Recording Industry Association of America (RIAA) in the summer of 1999. It was also certified platinum by the RIAA in September 2008.

Sepultura's 1996 album Roots features nu metal elements that were considered influential to the genre, while Roots itself was influenced by Korn's self-titled debut album. Nu metal continued to rise in popularity when Korn's 1996 album Life Is Peachy peaked at number 3 on the Billboard 200 and sold 106,000 copies in its first week of release. Attention through Ozzy Osbourne's 1996 introduction of Ozzfest was integral to boosting the careers of many nu metal bands, including Limp Bizkit.

=== 1997–2001: Mainstream breakthrough ===
"Headup" by Deftones featuring Max Cavalera (1997)
"Headup" by Deftones features Max Cavalera and was described by Decibel as Around the Fur's "most nü-metal track".

Few bands played nu metal until 1997, which Billboard writer William Goodman called a "banner year" for the genre, as Sevendust, Coal Chamber, Limp Bizkit and Papa Roach all released their debut albums. Limp Bizkit's Three Dollar Bill, Y'all (July 1997) grew in popularity as the band's mainstream profile rose, eventually going double platinum in the United States. Coal Chamber's self-titled debut was a minor hit—frequently compared to Korn—and gained exposure through the band's appearances at Ozzfest. Sugar Ray's Floored went multi-platinum, though its only hit—the reggae-leaning "Fly"—pointed toward the pop rock direction the band fully embraced on 14:59 (1999). Deftones' Around the Fur, also from 1997, reached number 29 on the Billboard 200 and was later certified platinum.

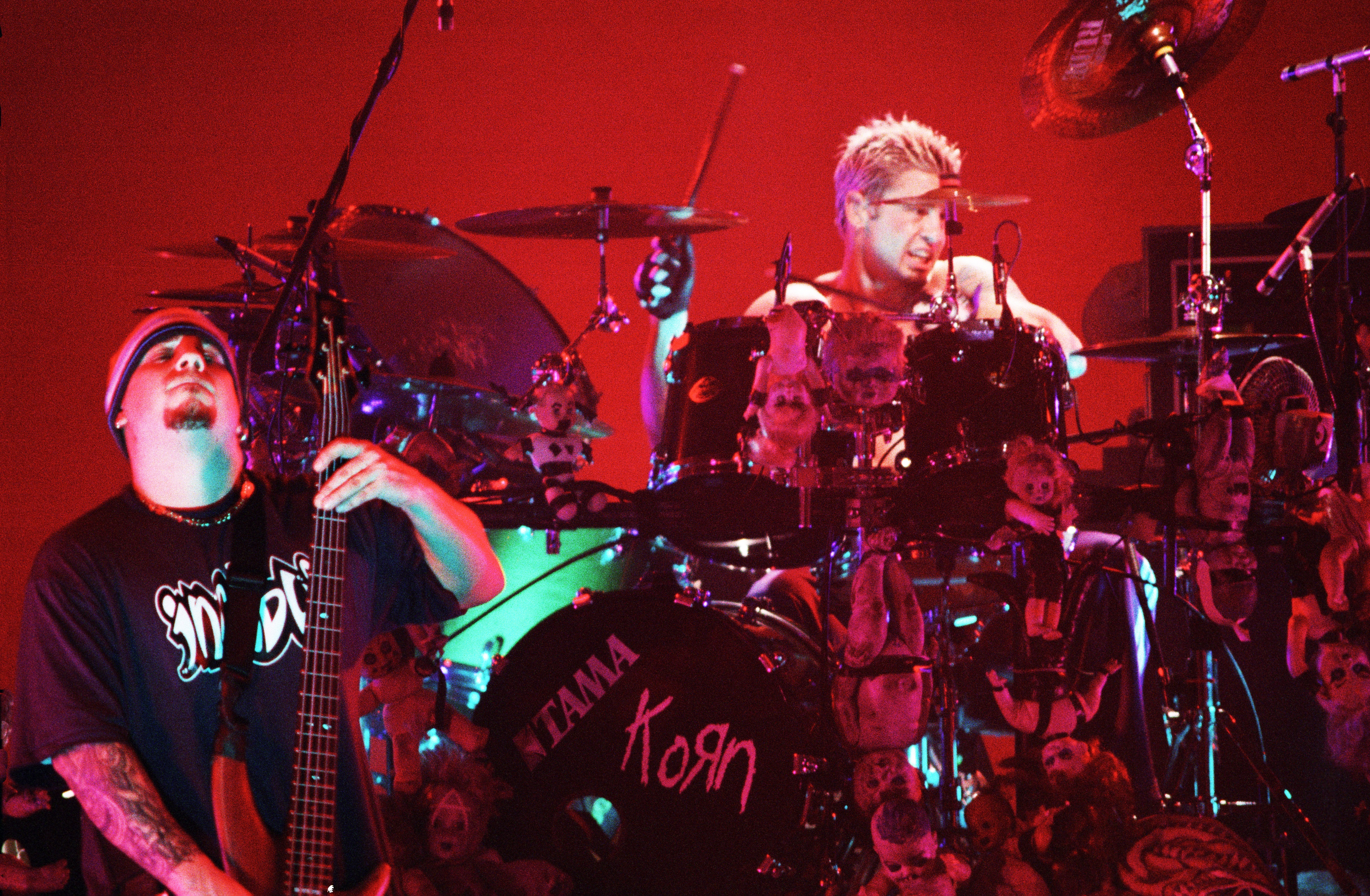
Korn bassist Reginald Arvizu and former drummer David Silveria performing live with the band in 1997

In 1998, nu metal achieved full mainstream success. Billboard later called August 18, 1998—which saw the release of Korn's Follow the Leader, Kid Rock's major-label debut Devil Without a Cause and Orgy's Candyass—the "Biggest Day in Nu-Metal History". Follow the Leader topped the Billboard 200, was certified multi-platinum, and paved the way for other nu metal bands. By this point many were signed to major labels and drew on heavy metal, hip-hop, industrial, or grunge. A number of established acts also adopted nu metal elements, among them rappers Vanilla Ice and Cypress Hill and metal bands Sepultura, Primus, Fear Factory, Machine Head and Slayer. In 1999, Korn's fourth album Issues also reached number 1 and was certified multi-platinum within a month. Korn, Limp Bizkit and P.O.D. appeared repeatedly on Total Request Live. As the genre grew, Limp Bizkit's hedonistic, hypermasculine songs appealed especially to "jocks" and fraternity men, while heavier bands drew mall goths and other outsiders who identified with the genre's angst-driven lyrics.

The Woodstock 1999 festival featured multiple nu metal artists and bands such as Korn, Limp Bizkit and Sevendust. During and after Limp Bizkit's performance at the festival, violence occurred and people tore plywood from the walls during the performance of the band's song "Break Stuff". Several sexual assaults were reported to have happened during the festival; a rape that was reported during Limp Bizkit's performance, and gang rape was reported to have occurred during Korn's set at the festival. Despite the incidents at the festival, Limp Bizkit's popularity and the sales of their then-recent album Significant Other were not affected. The album topped the Billboard 200 and was certified multi-platinum.

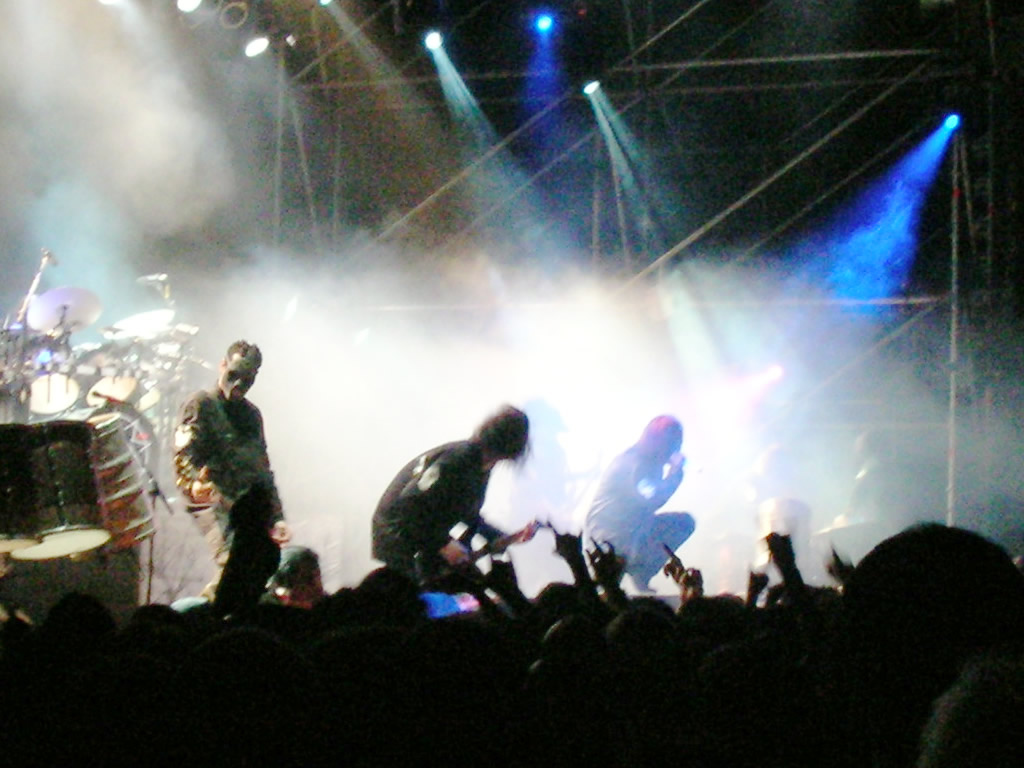
Slipknot performing in Buenos Aires in 2005

In 1999, Slipknot emerged with an extremely heavy nu metal sound, releasing their self-titled album, which was certified platinum in 2000 and 2× platinum in 2005. In a review of the band's self-titled album, Rick Anderson of AllMusic wrote about Slipknot, "You thought Limp Bizkit was hard? They're the Osmonds. These guys are something else entirely." Anderson noted the death metal influence on the album. Slipknot drummer Joey Jordison, noted by Anderson for his death metal-influenced drumming, said of Slipknot's music: "The roots are death metal, thrash, speed metal, and I could go on and on about all those bands."

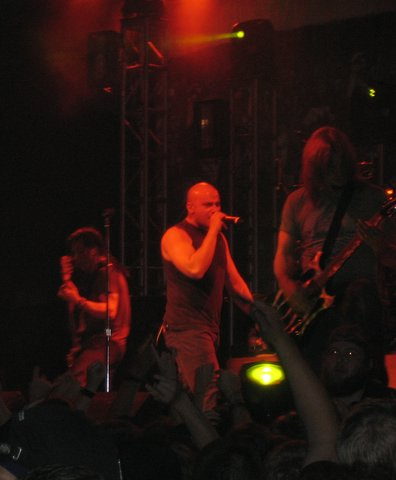
Disturbed performing in 2005

In 1999, Staind's second album Dysfunction yielded the Mainstream Rock hit "Mudshovel" and went multi-platinum. In 2000, Limp Bizkit's third album Chocolate Starfish and the Hot Dog Flavored Water set a record for the highest first-week sales of a rock album, selling over a million copies in its first week and breaking a seven-year-old record held by Pearl Jam's Vs. The same year, Papa Roach's Infest, Disturbed's debut The Sickness and P.O.D.'s The Fundamental Elements of Southtown all reached platinum status. Many nu metal acts—among them Kittie, Disturbed, Mudvayne, Linkin Park, Slipknot, Papa Roach, Static-X and Drowning Pool—performed at the commercially successful Ozzfest, while Papa Roach and Limp Bizkit joined rappers Eminem and Xzibit on the sold-out Anger Management Tour.

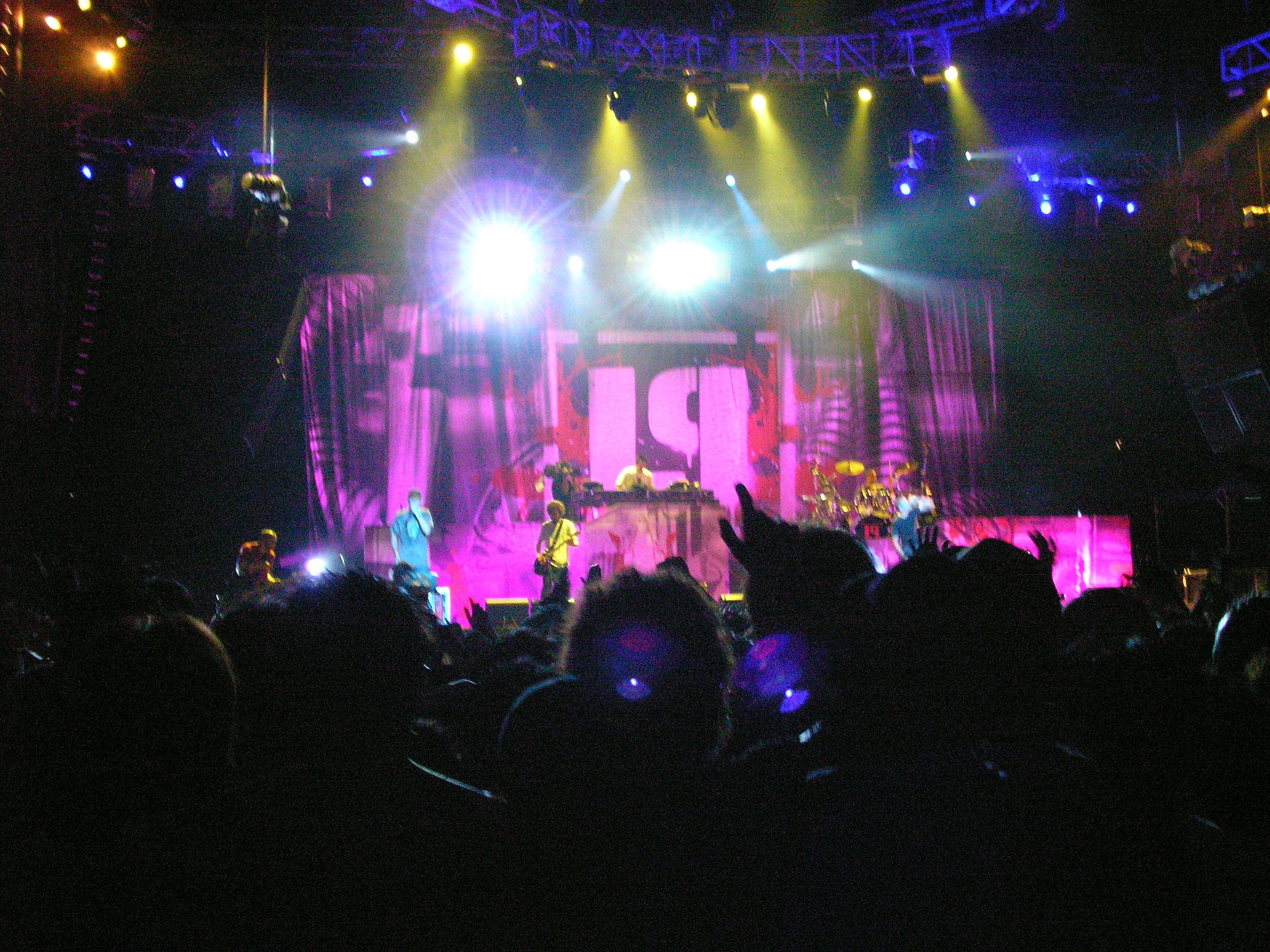
Linkin Park in 2006

Late in 2000, Linkin Park released their debut Hybrid Theory, which became the best-selling debut album of the 21st century and marked the commercial peak of nu metal. It was the best-selling album of 2001 in the United States and was ultimately certified diamond by the RIAA. The band won a Grammy Award for "Crawling", and its single "In the End" reached number 2 on the Billboard Hot 100 in early 2002.

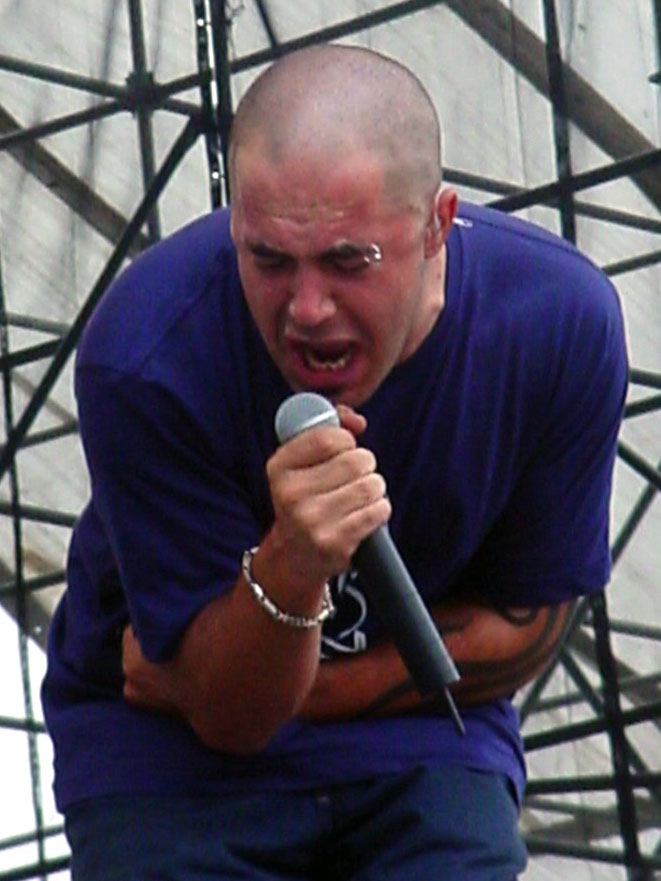
Aaron Lewis, the vocalist of Staind, performing in August 2001

Crazy Town's debut The Gift of Game reached number 9 on the Billboard 200 and went platinum. Staind's 2001 album Break the Cycle debuted at number 1 and was certified multi-platinum, although much of it showed the band moving toward a softer sound.

In August 2001, Slipknot released Iowa, which reached number 3 and went platinum; critic John Mulvey called it the "absolute triumph of nu metal". P.O.D.'s Satellite went triple platinum, and the band's popularity carried into 2002. Drowning Pool's debut Sinner also went platinum, and its single "Bodies" became a frequently played video on MTV. System of a Down's Toxicity topped the Billboard 200 and was certified multi-platinum; the band blended nu metal with Middle Eastern music, Armenian music and jazz, and was noted for its political lyrics.

=== 2001–2004: Continued success and early signs of decline ===
In 2003, MTV reported that nu metal's mainstream popularity had declined over the previous year, noting that Korn's Untouchables and Papa Roach's Lovehatetragedy both sold less than their predecessors and that the bands' new releases featured fewer hip-hop elements. Korn's Jonathan Davis attributed the lower sales of Untouchables to music piracy, as the album had leaked online months before release. MTV further observed that nu metal received less radio and television airplay and that the genre's talent pool had been diluted by numerous similar-sounding bands, including American Head Charge, Adema, Cold and Dope, whose albums "left more of a collective impression than individual ones". It also noted that Kid Rock's country single "Picture" outperformed his nu-metal-styled material. During this time, indie and garage rock revival bands such as the Strokes, The White Stripes, and Jet began achieving mainstream success as nu metal's popularity started to decline.

Despite that narrative, Untouchables was certified platinum and its single "Here to Stay" received heavy radio play and topped MTV's Total Request Live, though the album still sold less than Korn's most successful release, Follow the Leader. Linkin Park's remix album Reanimation sold over a million copies in 2002, which MTV called impressive for a remix album, and P.O.D. remained popular with Satellite.

In 2003, Linkin Park's Meteora debuted at number 1 and was certified multi-platinum. Limp Bizkit's Results May Vary (2003) shifted toward alternative rock; it reached number 3 but drew poor reviews and sold far less than the band's earlier albums. Korn's Take a Look in the Mirror likewise sold less than its predecessors. Staind's 2003 album 14 Shades of Grey was significantly less heavy than previous albums and shows the band's departure from nu metal and a movement towards a lighter sound. Even so, several international acts found success with the style, including Three Days Grace from Canada and Lostprophets from Wales, the latter scoring the highest-charting single by a UK rock band in 2003 with "Last Train Home".

=== 2004–2010: Further decline and new directions ===
Although nu metal's popularity survived into 2002 and 2003, much of it had dropped significantly by 2004. By the mid-late 2000s, the popularity of emo exceeded that of nu metal. Also during this time, metalcore, a fusion of extreme metal and hardcore punk, became one of the most popular genres in the new wave of American heavy metal, with the success of bands like Killswitch Engage, Shadows Fall, God Forbid, Unearth, Trivium, and Bullet for My Valentine. Groove metal band Lamb of God also became successful in the heavy metal genre. Stephen Hill of Louder Sound called the rise of metalcore after the decline of nu metal "the metalcore revolution".

In the mid-late 2000s, several nu metal bands experimented with other genres to adapt to the changes in trends. Linkin Park's third studio album Minutes to Midnight, released in 2007, was noted for its near-complete departure from the band's nu metal sound. Describing the album's style, singer Chester Bennington stated, "We've really moved away from anything that sounds like nu-metal." Nu metal bands such as Disturbed, Soulfly, Drowning Pool, and Slipknot had begun to utilize heavier elements of groove metal, death metal and thrash metal into their music. Similarly to Limp Bizkit; Staind and Papa Roach had also begun experimenting with Alternative Rock into their sound. Papa Roach abandoned the nu metal genre entirely with their 2004 album Getting Away with Murder, moving to a hard rock style. System of a Down released two albums in 2005, Mezmerize and Hypnotize. Both did well commercially and critically, but the band took a more alternative metal approach to the two albums compared to their past three efforts. In 2005, Limp Bizkit released an EP called The Unquestionable Truth (Part 1) which had little promotion and advertising. The album was not very popular; its sales fell 67% during its second week of release. In 2006, Limp Bizkit went on hiatus. In 2012, vocalist Fred Durst said:

"Here's the deal: say in 2000, there were 35 million people who connected to this band. Twelve years later, lots of those people have moved on. We were a moment in time and it's over."

=== 2010s: Underground revival ===
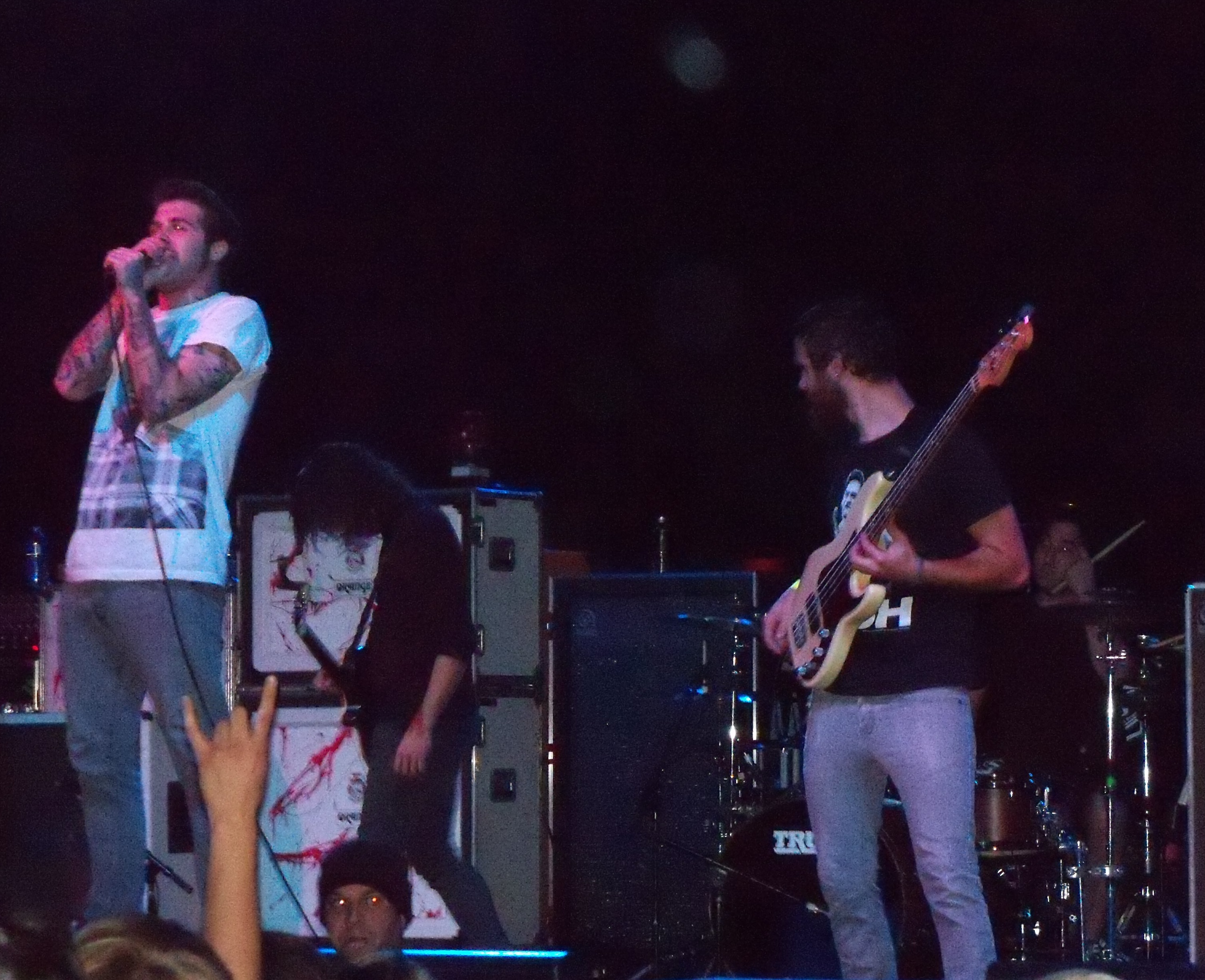
Of Mice & Men is one of several metalcore bands that added elements of nu metal to later albums.

During the mid-2010s, there was a discussion within media of a possible nu metal revival because of bands fusing nu metal with other genres. Despite the lack of radio play and popularity, some nu metal bands recaptured some of their former popularity as they released albums in a nu metal style. Many metalcore and deathcore groups gained moderate popularity in the 2010s and used elements from nu metal. This fusion is nu metalcore. Suicide Silence's 2011 album The Black Crown, which features elements of nu metal and deathcore, peaked at number 28 on the Billboard 200. In 2014, Issues' self-titled debut album peaked at number 9 on the same chart. The album features elements of metalcore, nu metal, pop and R&B. Of Mice & Men's 2014 album Restoring Force, which features elements of nu metal, peaked at number 4 on the Billboard 200. Bring Me the Horizon, often described as a metalcore band, released their fifth album That's the Spirit, which peaked at number 2 on the Billboard 200, in 2015. The album draws from multiple genres including nu metal and would experiment further with nu metal on their 2020 album Post Human: Survival Horror. The band's keyboardist has described them as a nu metal band. Motionless In White in Graveyard Shift and Disguise features elements of industrial, gothic, metalcore and nu metal.

Some media outlets viewed a nu metal revival as beginning in the 2010s with groups like Blood Youth, Cane Hill, Stray From The Path, Sworn In, DangerKids, Islander, and Blind Channel. Within this movement, nu metalcore became increasingly prominent through the popularity of groups like Vein.fm, Loathe and Code Orange. According to PopMatters writer Ethan Stewart, Code Orange's 2017 album Forever led to nu metalcore becoming "one of the most prominent flavors of contemporary metal".

=== Late 2010s–present: Mainstream revival and influence on other genres ===
While some media outlets believed these 2010s artists marked the start of a nu metal revival, Metal Hammer writer Dannii Leivers cited the aforementioned groups as simply hinting towards a revival, instead claiming a revival began in 2021, "a crop of young revivalists... looking to put a brand-new spin on the music of their formative years", namely Tetrarch. Other notable acts in this wave include Tallah, Orthodox, Vended, and Wargasm.

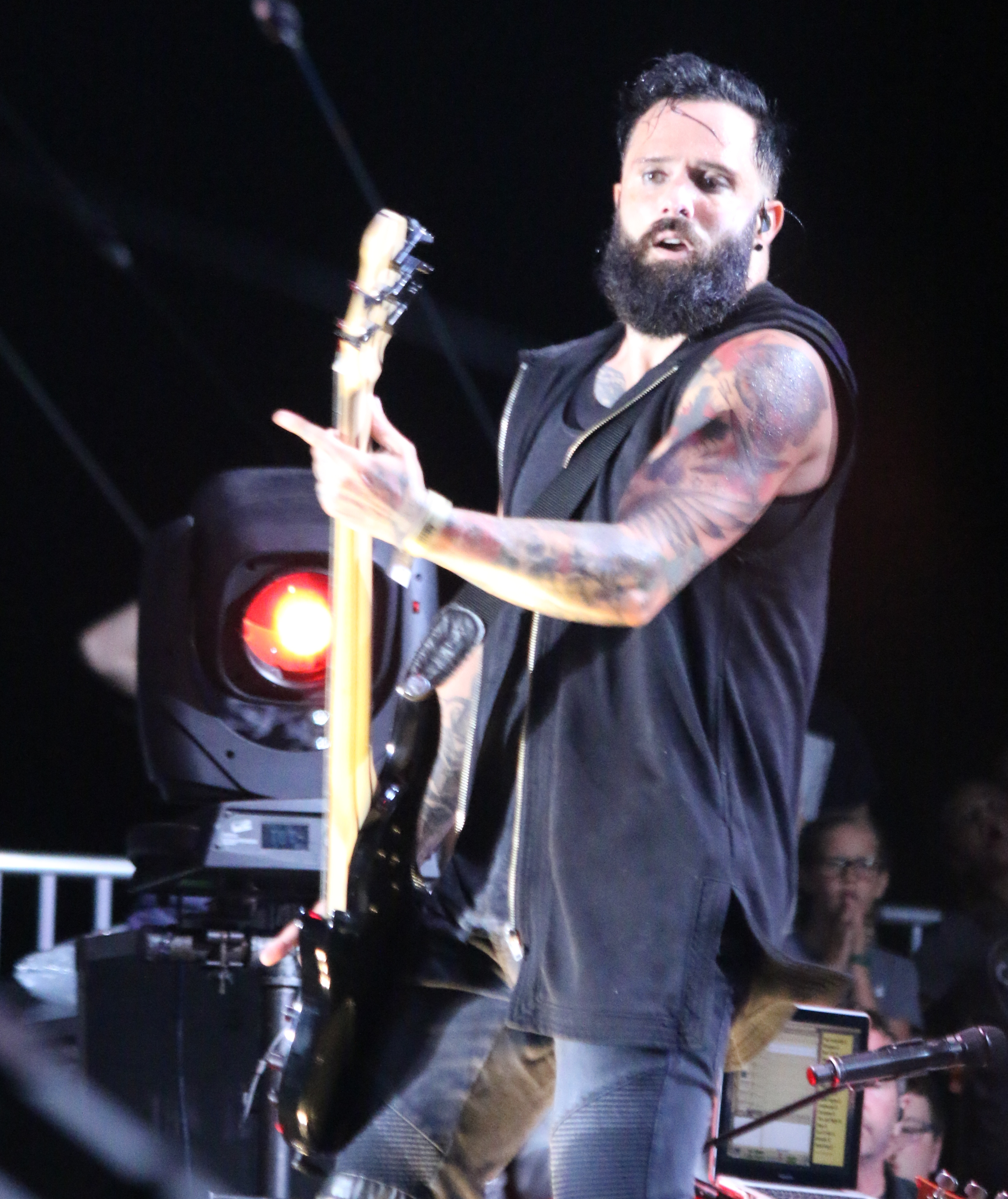
Skillet frontman John Cooper founded Fight the Fury to return to a specifically heavy sound.

In 2018, John L. Cooper, the frontman of Christian rock band Skillet, formed Fight the Fury as a side project inspired by the sound of acts like Metallica, Disturbed, and Slipknot. Echoing elements of nu metal from Collide in 2003, the Still Breathing EP explores various social themes, such as child abuse, spiritual issues, and mental health.

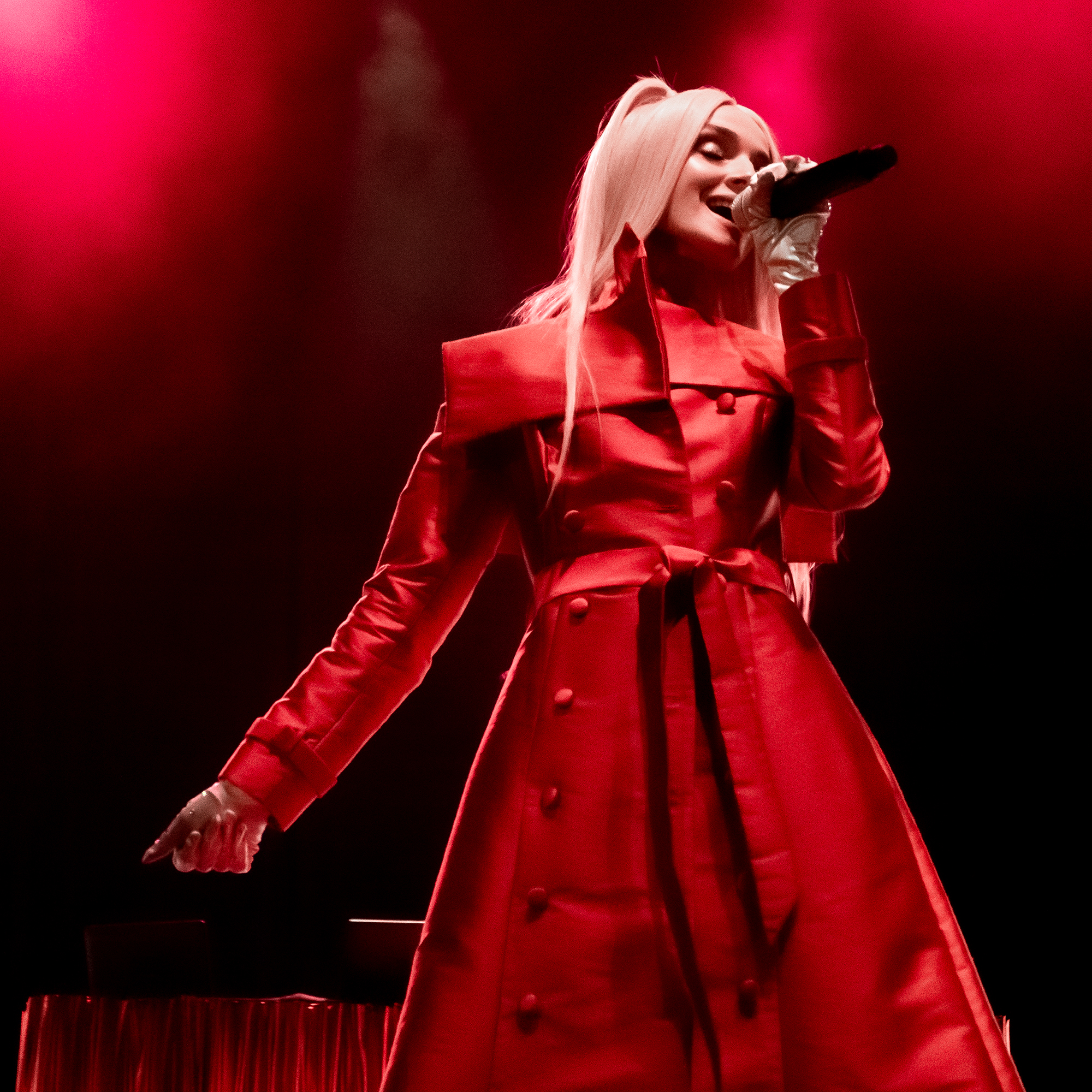
Poppy incorporated nu metal into electropop on her albums I Disagree and Am I a Girl?.

Electronic and art pop singer-songwriters incorporated nu metal into their sound in the late 2010s and early 2020s. Poppy has incorporated nu metal on her albums Am I a Girl? and I Disagree, Grimes on album Miss Anthropocene and Rina Sawayama on Sawayama. The songs "We Appreciate Power" and "Play Destroy" were pioneering examples. Poppy has described this fusion as "nu-Poppy" or "Poppymetal". I Disagree received critical acclaim for this fusion, with single "Bloodmoney" nominated for the 2021 Grammy Award for Best Metal Performance, making her the first female solo artist to be nominated for the award in its history. Dorian Electra incorporated nu metal influences on their album My Agenda, as did Ashnikko on Demidevil, particularly on single "Cry". The Guardian noted that these mostly female artists have revived nu metal, a mostly male genre, and successfully adapted it to showcase a female perspective. Rina Sawayama said "metal itself lends itself to toxic masculine tropes, but it's also almost taking the piss out of a very masculine expression of emotion". Smaller bands have also rose to the scene in the early 2020s with the genre, including London-based Wargasm, who have been "validated by the nu-metal daddies," after Korn vocalist Jonathan Davis described them as "his new favourite band."

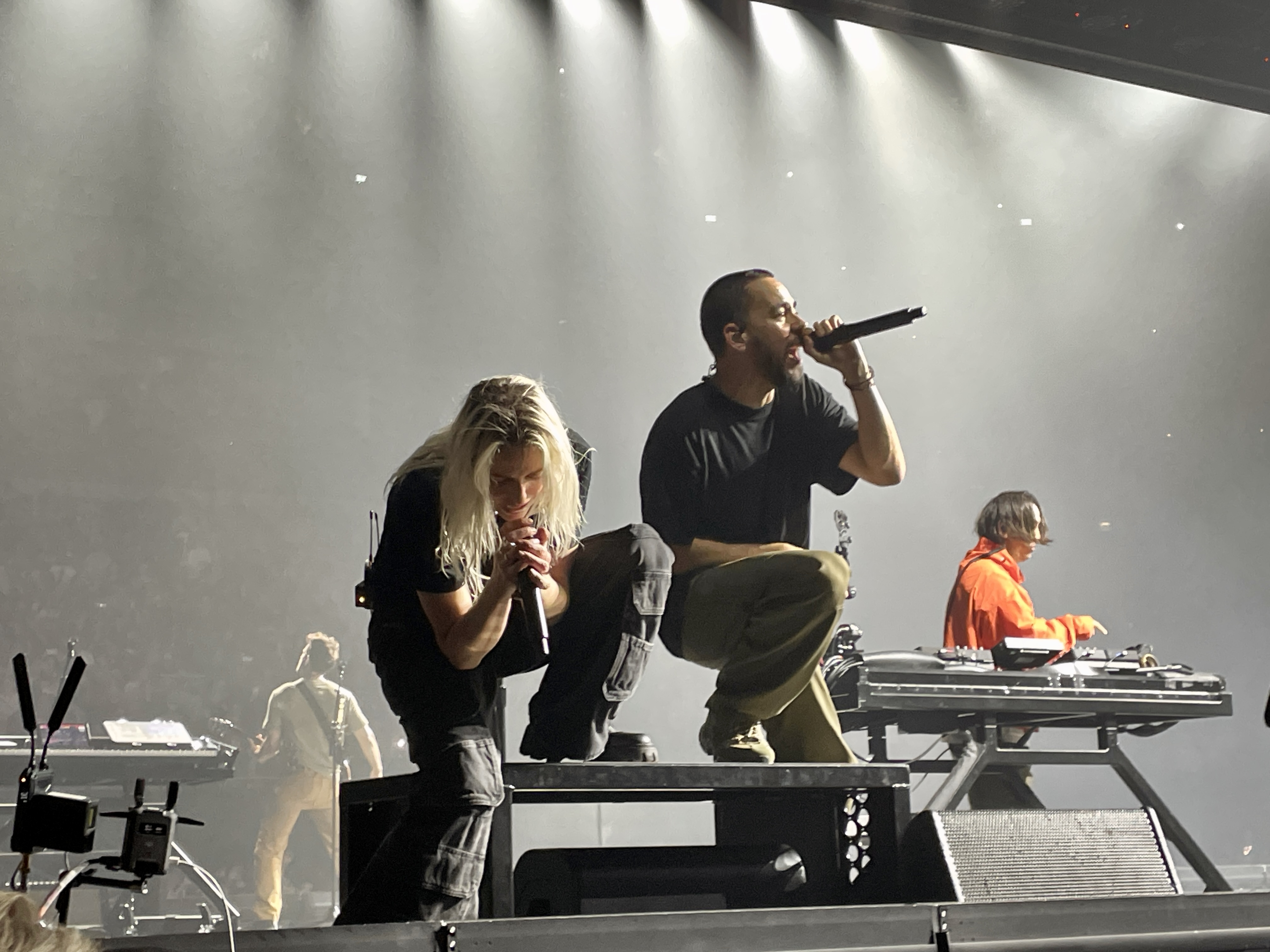
Linkin Park generated a large amount of media publicity by its revival in 2024.

In the early 2020s, several media outlets noted that nu metal has undergone a resurgence in interest among Generation Z listeners. In 2023, Google searches for the term "nu metal" were reported as being at their highest in "nearly 20 years". Deftones and Slipknot began gaining popularity among Generation Z in the early 2020s when their music was featured in videos on the app TikTok. Also, several nu metal bands returned and released new music after decades like Staind, Adema, Alien Ant Farm and Kittie. Late 2024 saw the surprise revival of Linkin Park after a seven-year hiatus following the death of frontman Chester Bennington in 2017. With new singer Emily Armstrong of the rock band Dead Sara and new drummer Colin Brittain, the band released their eighth studio album From Zero on November 15. Several songs on the album, such as lead single "The Emptiness Machine", "Heavy Is the Crown", and "Two Faced" call back to their earlier nu metal sound prominently featured on Hybrid Theory and Meteora.

== Legacy ==
=== Reception ===
Despite its popularity around the turn of the millennium, nu metal has been criticized by heavy metal fans and labelled with derogatory terms such as "mallcore" and "whinecore". Gregory Heaney of AllMusic called it "one of metal's more unfortunate pushes into the mainstream"; Lucy Jones of NME called it "the worst genre of all time"; and Garry Sharpe-Young dismissed it as "a dumbed-down and—thankfully short[-]lived exercise". When Machine Head adopted a nu metal sound on The Burning Red, the band were accused of "selling out", a charge they dismissed.

Several prominent metal musicians voiced similar disdain: Lamb of God's Randy Blythe said nu metal "sucks" and predicted audiences were "ready for angrier music", Megadeth's Dave Mustaine said he would "rather have his eyelids pulled out" than listen to it, and Gary Holt of Exodus said he was "so glad" about its decline. Some of nu metal's own influences also distanced themselves from it: Mike Patton of Faith No More said he felt "no responsibility" for the genre, while Page Hamilton of Helmet objected to being "credited with or discredited with creating" a sound the band "sound[ed] nothing like". Trent Reznor of Nine Inch Nails called many nu metal bands "insincere" and "a parody of itself". Although Fred Durst of Limp Bizkit cited Rage Against the Machine as an influence, Rage's bassist Tim Commerford called Limp Bizkit "one of the dumbest bands in the history of music", and "apologize[d]" for influencing them.

Others have defended the genre. Jody MacGregor of FasterLouder, while calling nu metal "music's most hated genre", argued it was "not as bad as people think". Coal Chamber's Dez Fafara said he was proud of the association and that nu metal bands "broke new musical ground", while Slipknot's Corey Taylor, The Smashing Pumpkins' Billy Corgan and Sevendust's Lajon Witherspoon praised its cross-pollination of styles and its influence on later metal. Jack Porter of The Michigan Daily argued that the label had become "a ghetto" for any heavy, radio-friendly band perceived as low in quality, causing serious listeners to overlook the genre's merits. Writing for Loudwire, Eduardo Rivadavia credited nu metal with reviving the commercial fortunes of heavy metal in the late 1990s and helping pave the way for the new wave of American heavy metal, metalcore and post-metal.

=== Usage of the label ===
Some heavy metal musicians rejected nu metal as a legitimate metal subgenre, arguing it is not "true heavy metal", and some acts most associated with the genre have likewise distanced themselves from the term. Slipknot described their own music simply as "metal metal", treating their link to nu metal as a coincidence of timing. Korn's Jonathan Davis long resisted the label, maintaining that the band may have "invented a new genre" but that "nu-metal" was coined for the bands that followed, and he also rejected the "heavy metal" tag, describing Korn instead as a funk band. By 2019, however, he had grown comfortable with it, calling it "pretty cool to say we helped invent some kind of movement."

Staind's Aaron Lewis, Wes Borland of Limp Bizkit, Mike Wengren of Disturbed and Godsmack's Sully Erna similarly disowned the nu metal or "heavy metal" labels. Mike Shinoda of Linkin Park said the band "never held the flag for nu-metal", which he associated with "arrogant, misogynistic" frat rock. Chino Moreno of Deftones—a band frequently grouped with nu metal early on—was especially vocal, refusing to be "lumped in" with the scene and criticizing peers such as Korn, which prompted a public exchange with Davis. Linkin Park's Chester Bennington initially said he "hate[d] that genre", but by 2012 had come to accept the label for the band's early work, noting that few others were blending metal and hip-hop when Linkin Park began.

== See also ==
- List of nu metal bands
- Alternative metal
- Rap rock
- Rap metal
- New wave of American heavy metal
- Neue Deutsche Härte

== Bibliography ==
- Arnopp, Jason (2011). Slipknot: Inside the Sickness, Behind the Masks With an Intro by Ozzy Osbourne and Afterword by Gene Simmons. Random House. ISBN 978-0-09-187933-4.
- Arvizu, Reginald (2009). Got the Life: My Journey of Addiction, Faith, Recovery, and Korn. William Morrow. ISBN 978-0-06-166249-2.
- Christe, Ian (2004). Sound of the Beast: The Complete Headbanging History of Heavy Metal. Harper. ISBN 0-380-81127-8.
- Devenish, Colin (2000). Limp Bizkit. St. Martin's Press. ISBN 0-312-26349-X.
- Furman, Leah (2000). Korn: Life in the Pit. St. Martin's Griffin. ISBN 0-312-25396-6.
- Kitts, Jeff; Tolinski, Brad (2002). Guitar World Presents Nu-metal. Hal Leonard Corporation. ISBN 0-634-03287-9.
- McIver, Joel (2002). Nu-metal: The Next Generation of Rock & Punk. Omnibus Press. ISBN 0-7119-9209-6.
- Porter, Dick (2003). Rapcore: The Nu-Metal Rap Fusion. Plexus Publishing. ISBN 0-85965-321-8.
- Small, Doug (1998). Korn. Omnibus Press. ISBN 0-8256-1688-3.
- Udo, Tommy (2002). Brave Nu World. Sanctuary Publishing. ISBN 1-86074-415-X.
- Newquist, Harvey P.; Maloof, Rich (2004). The New Metal Masters. Hal Leonard Corporation. ISBN 978-0-87930-804-9.
