= Am I a Girl? =

Studio album by Poppy
- Released: October 31, 2018
- Recorded: Mid-2017 – January 10, 2018, October 2018
- Genre: Dance-pop; synth-pop; electropop; nu metal
- Length: 39:28
- Label: I'm Poppy; Mad Decent
- Producer: Alvaro; Aryay; Authentic Producer; Zakk Cervini; Diplo; Dr. R; Fernando Garibay; Chris Greatti; Thomas Helsloot; Vaughn Oliver; Daniel Padilla; Ramiro Padilla; Titanic Sinclair; Wax Motif

Poppy chronology
| Poppy.Remixes (2018) | Am I a Girl? (2018) | Choke (2019) |

Singles from Am I a Girl?
- 1. "In a Minute" Released: July 27, 2018; 2. "Time Is Up" Released: August 22, 2018; 3. "Fashion After All" Released: October 12, 2018; 4. "Hard Feelings" Released: October 19, 2018; 5. "X" Released: October 25, 2018

Am I a Girl? is the second studio album by American singer and songwriter Poppy. It was released on October 31, 2018, by Mad Decent. Musically, it is primarily a dance-pop record, with some songs incorporating elements of the nu metal genre. The album was recorded with several producers and co-writers including Vaughn Oliver, Wax Motif, Fernando Garibay, Zakk Cervini and more.

Before its release, Poppy had described the album as having a French, vaporwave and Kate Bush influence. The album features guest appearances from Diplo, Garibay and vocals from Grimes. It was supported by five singles, all of which featured a pop sound but later explored metal with the final single.

== Composition ==
Am I a Girl? has been labelled by critics as a dance-pop, synth-pop, electropop, and nu metal album. The final tracks of the record, "Am I a Girl?", "Play Destroy", and "X" explore heavy metal.

== Promotion ==
=== Singles ===
"In a Minute" was released as the lead single from the album on July 27, 2018. On August 10, the second single "Time Is Up" featuring Diplo was released alongside a music video.

On October 12, 2018, Poppy released "Fashion After All" as the third single, followed by fourth single "Hard Feelings" on October 19. "X" was released as the fifth and final single from the album on October 25, 2018. The music video for "X" was released on November 5, 2018.

On October 30, 2018, "Play Destroy", which features Canadian singer Grimes, was released early on Poppy's YouTube channel several hours before the album was out worldwide. This track received critical attention for its blend of pop and heavy metal. Despite not being featured on the album, "Immature Couture" was released as a promotional single in September using Am I a Girl?'s album artwork.

Following the viral success of "Girls In Bikinis" on TikTok, Mad Decent intended to release an exclusive vinyl of "Girls In Bikinis" / "Fashion After All" on November 26, 2020 through Record Store Day's website. However, Poppy stated that she didn't consent to put out the vinyl and later said she's grateful that she left the record label. The vinyl was eventually not released.

=== Tour ===
In late 2018 and early 2019, Poppy embarked on the Am I a Girl? Tour in support of the album.

== Critical reception ==
Professional ratings
Review scores
| Source | Rating |
|---|---|
| AllMusic | 3.5/5 stars |
| Highsnobiety | 3.0/5 |

Am I a Girl? received polarized reviews from music critics. Highsnobiety described Poppy as "intriguing if not wholly charismatic" and found that the album "is an enjoyable enough club record, but it fails to add anything new to the conversation". AllMusic noted Poppy's sense of humor is evident during the record and remarked that while "not as cohesive as Poppy.Computer, Am I a Girl? definitely isn't stale, and it succeeds at expanding Poppy's sound and identity enough to keep fans listening and guessing."

Maura Johnston of Rolling Stone described the album's shift into metal music in its latter half as a satisfying "critique of the mental whipsawing one has to do in order to survive in 2018", and Poppy referred to the genre as "Poppymetal".

== Track listing ==
Credits adapted from Tidal.

Am I a Girl? track listing
| No. | Title | Writer(s) | Producer(s) | Length |
|---|---|---|---|---|
| 1. | "In a Minute" | Poppy Chan; Kate Nash; Nolan Lambroza; Simon Wilcox | Dr. R | 2:53 |
| 2. | "Fashion After All" | Poppy Chan; Titanic Sinclair; Tommy English | Wax Motif | 3:23 |
| 3. | "Iconic" | Poppy Chan; Sinclair; Wilcox | Fernando Garibay; Daniel Padilla; Ramiro Padilla | 2:52 |
| 4. | "Chic Chick" | Poppy Chan; Sinclair; Wilcox; English | Vaughn Oliver | 2:54 |
| 5. | "Interlude 1" | Poppy Chan | Dr. R | 0:47 |
| 6. | "Time Is Up" (featuring Diplo) | Poppy Chan; Thomas Wesley Pentz; Wilcox; Jasper Helderman; Sinclair; English; Oliver; Thomas Helsloot | Diplo; Alvaro; Helsloot; Oliver | 3:29 |
| 7. | "Aristocrat" (featuring Garibay) | Poppy Chan; Sinclair; Wilcox; Garibay | Garibay; D. Padilla; R. Padilla | 3:21 |
| 8. | "Hard Feelings" | Poppy Chan; Sinclair; Wilcox; Chris Greatti; Garibay | Garibay; D. Padilla; R. Padilla | 3:39 |
| 9. | "Girls in Bikinis" | Poppy Chan; Sinclair; Wilcox | Oliver | 2:25 |
| 10. | "The Rapture Ball" | Poppy Chan; Sinclair; Wilcox; English | Aryay | 3:00 |
| 11. | "Interlude 2" | Poppy Chan | Dr. R | 1:06 |
| 12. | "Am I a Girl?" | Poppy Chan; Sinclair; Wilcox | Zakk Cervini; Sinclair | 3:37 |
| 13. | "Play Destroy" (featuring Grimes) | Poppy Chan; Authentic Songwriter; Greatti; Claire Boucher | Greatti; Authentic Producer; Grimes^{[a]} | 3:05 |
| 14. | "X" | Poppy Chan; Sinclair; Greatti; Cervini | Cervini; Greatti | 2:54 |
| Total length: | | | | 39:28 |

Notes

- ^{^[a]} signifies an additional producer
- "Interlude 1" and "Interlude 2" are each titled as "+" on the physical versions of the album.

== Release history ==
Release dates and formats for Am I a Girl?
| Region | Date | Format | Label | Ref. |
|---|---|---|---|---|
| Various | October 31, 2018 | Digital download; streaming | I'm Poppy; Mad Decent | |
| Various | December 21, 2018 | CD; LP record | I'm Poppy; Mad Decent | |
