= NSynth =

Machine learning audio synthesizer

NSynth: Neural Audio Synthesis
- Original author(s): Google Brain, Deep Mind, Magenta
- Initial release: 6 April 2017; 8 years ago
- Repository: github.com/magenta/magenta/tree/main/magenta/models/nsynth
- Written in: Python
- Type: Software synthesizer
- License: Apache 2.0
- Website: magenta.tensorflow.org/nsynth

NSynth (a portmanteau of "Neural Synthesis") is a WaveNet-based autoencoder for synthesizing audio, outlined in a paper in April 2017.

== Overview ==
The model generates sounds through a neural network based synthesis, employing a WaveNet-style autoencoder to learn its own temporal embeddings from four different sounds. Google then released an open source hardware interface for the algorithm called NSynth Super, used by notable musicians such as Grimes and YACHT to generate experimental music using artificial intelligence. The research and development of the algorithm was part of a collaboration between Google Brain, Magenta and DeepMind.

== Technology ==
=== Dataset ===
The NSynth dataset is composed of 305,979 one-shot instrumental notes featuring a unique pitch, timbre, and envelope, sampled from 1,006 instruments from commercial sample libraries. For each instrument the dataset contains four-second 16 kHz audio snippets by ranging over every pitch of a standard MIDI piano, as well as five different velocities. The dataset is made available under a Creative Commons Attribution 4.0 International (CC BY 4.0) license.

=== Machine learning model ===
A spectral autoencoder model and a WaveNet autoencoder model are publicly available on GitHub. The baseline model uses a spectrogram with fft_size 1024 and hop_size 256, MSE loss on the magnitudes, and the Griffin-Lim algorithm for reconstruction. The WaveNet model trains on mu-law encoded waveform chunks of size 6144. It learns embeddings with 16 dimensions that are downsampled by 512 in time.

== NSynth Super ==
NSynth Super
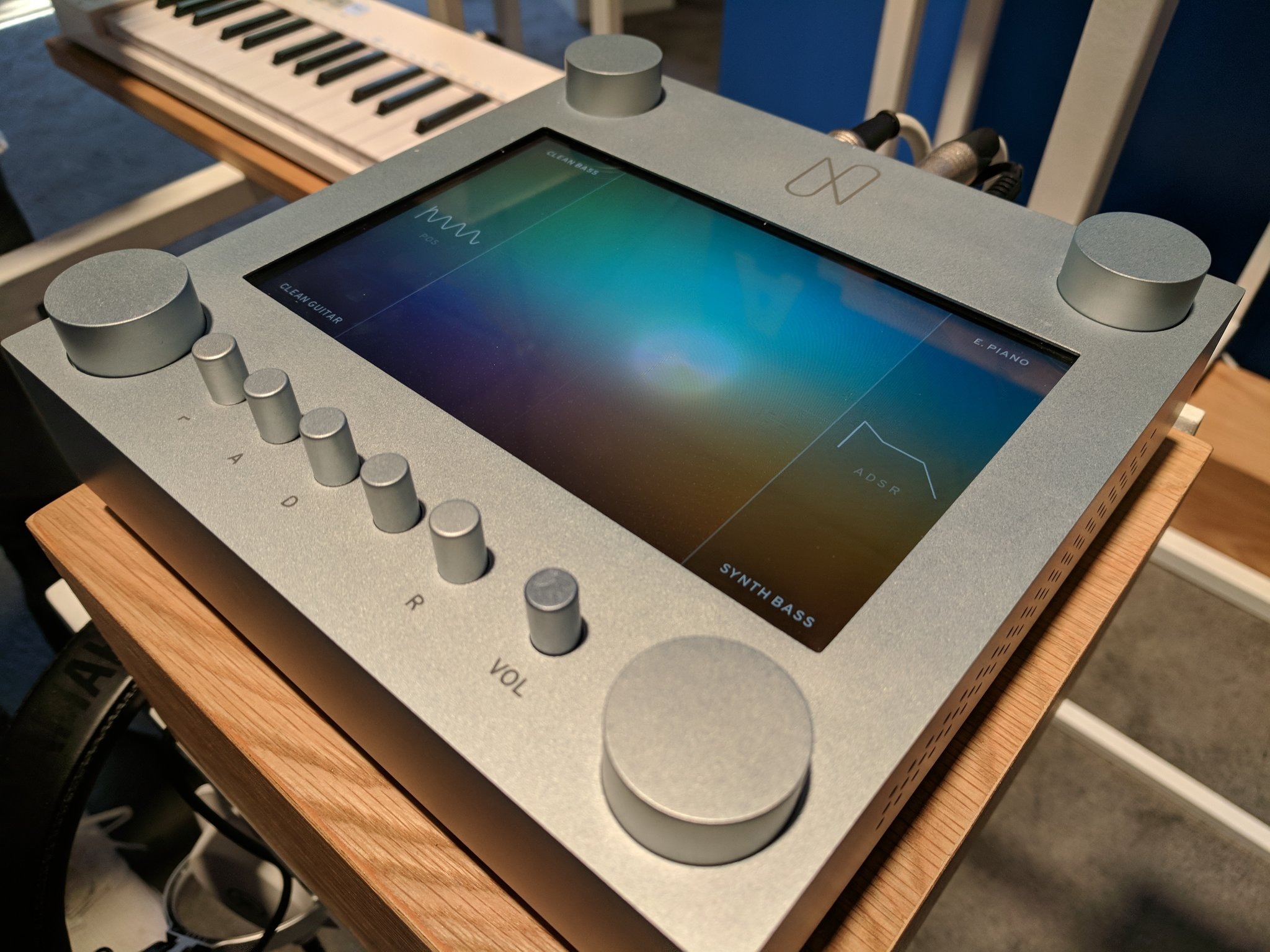
- NSynth Super Front Panel
- Manufacturer: Google Brain, Google Creative Lab
- Dates: 2018

Technical specifications
- Synthesis type: Neural Network Sample-based synthesis

Input/output
- Left-hand control: Pitch bend, ADSR
- External control: MIDI

In 2018 Google released a hardware interface for the NSynth algorithm, called NSynth Super, designed to provide an accessible physical interface to the algorithm for musicians to use in their artistic production.

Design files, source code and internal components are released under an open source Apache License 2.0, enabling hobbyists and musicians to freely build and use the instrument. At the core of the NSynth Super there is a Raspberry Pi, extended with a custom printed circuit board to accommodate the interface elements.

== Influence ==
Despite not being publicly available as a commercial product, NSynth Super has been used by notable artists, including Grimes and YACHT.

Grimes reported using the instrument in her 2020 studio album Miss Anthropocene.

YACHT announced an extensive use of NSynth Super in their album Chain Tripping.

Claire L. Evans compared the potential influence of the instrument to the Roland TR-808.

The NSynth Super design was honored with a D&AD Yellow Pencil award in 2018.
