= Grimes discography =

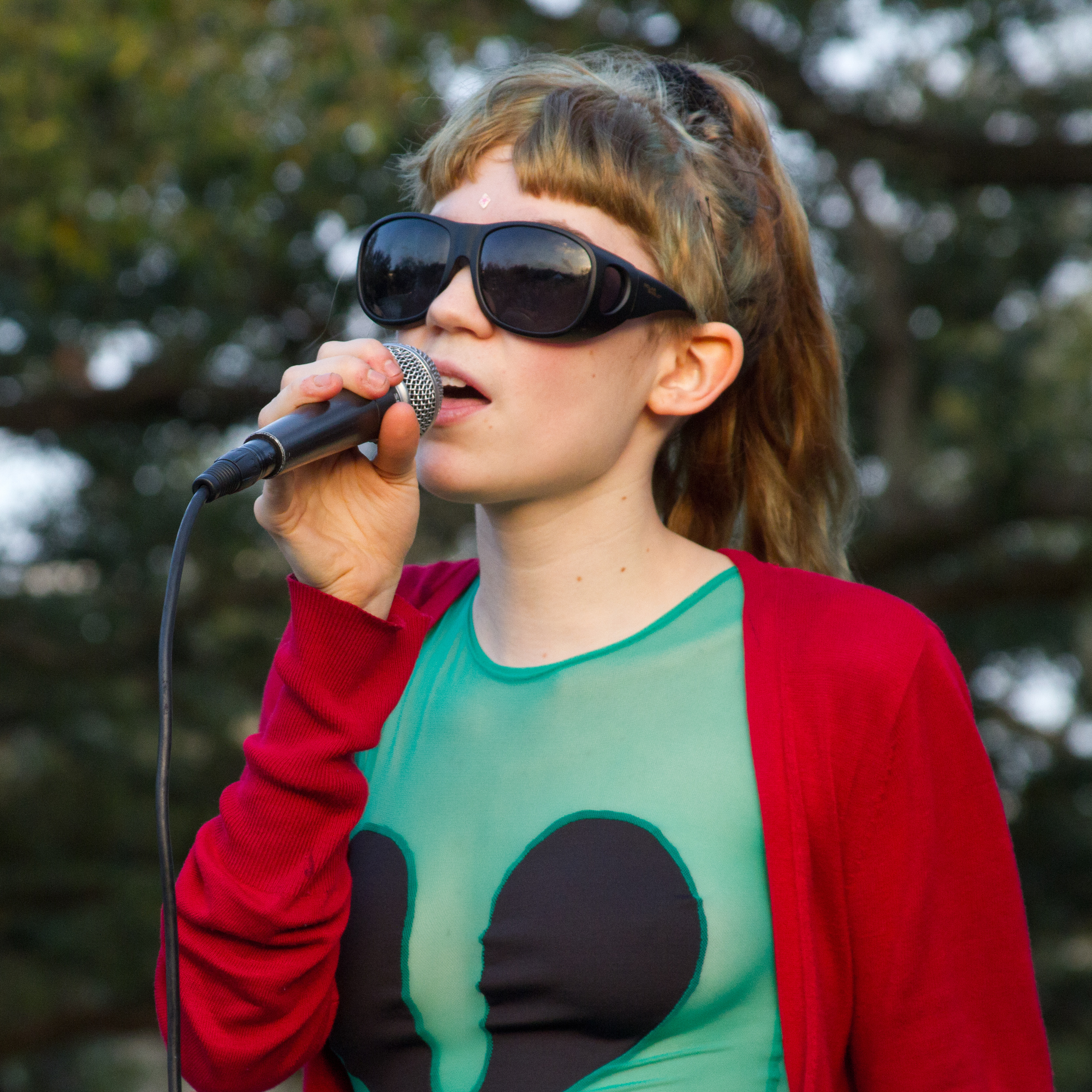
- Grimes in 2012
- Studio albums: 5
- EPs: 3
- Singles: 27
- Music videos: 26
- Promotional singles: 4
- Remix albums: 1
- DJ mixes: 1

Canadian singer and songwriter Grimes has released five studio albums, one remix album, one DJ mix, three extended plays (EPs), twenty-seven singles (seven as a featured artist), four promotional singles, and twenty-six music videos. Born and raised in Vancouver, Grimes attended McGill University in Montréal, where she became involved in Bachelor of Arts and Science program.

Grimes named herself after grime music after discovering the existence of the genre via Myspace. In January 2010, she released her debut album, Geidi Primes on Arbutus Records, followed by Halfaxa, in September of that year. In late 2011, she announced that she had signed with 4AD, who partnered with Arbutus Records to release her third studio album, Visions, in 2012. Visions met critical acclaim and was hailed by The New York Times as "one of the most impressive albums of the year so far". Her fourth album, Art Angels, was released in 2015, and her fifth, Miss Anthropocene, was released in 2020.

Grimes' has been noted by critics for her vocals, which have been described as "sweet, thin and hazy"., as well as a wide array of influences, ranging from electronica to pop, hip hop, R&B, dance, and classical.

In 2013, Grimes was awarded the Webby Award for Artist of the Year and a Juno Award for Electronic Album of the year. She has made the Polaris Music Prize Shortlist twice; in 2012 for Visions in 2016 for Art Angels.

As of March 2021, Grimes's albums have earned 736,000 consumption units, of which 307,000 are album sales and 554 million on-demand song streams in the United States, according to MRC Data.

== Albums ==
=== Studio albums ===
List of studio albums, with selected details, selected chart positions, and sales
Title	Details	Peak chart positions										Sales	Certifications
Title	Details	CAN	AUS	BEL (FL)	IRE	NL	NZ	SCO	SWI	UK	US	Sales	Certifications
Geidi Primes	Released: January 10, 2010; Label: Arbutus; Formats: CD, LP, digital download, cassette	—	—	—	—	—	—	—	—	—	—		
Halfaxa	Released: September 30, 2010; Label: Arbutus; Formats: CD, LP, digital download	—	—	—	—	—	—	—	—	—	—		
Visions	Released: February 21, 2012; Label: 4AD; Formats: CD, LP, digital download	—	— (Note: Visions did not enter the ARIA Top 100 Albums Chart, but peaked at seven on the Australian Hitseekers Albums chart.)	46	65	—	—	94	—	67	98	US: 110,000	MC: Gold; BPI: Silver; RMNZ: Gold
Art Angels	Released: November 6, 2015; Label: 4AD; Formats: CD, LP, digital download, cassette	16	30	82	31	84	28	40	—	31	36	US: 50,000	BPI: Silver
Miss Anthropocene	Released: February 21, 2020; Label: 4AD; Formats: CD, LP, digital download	31	10	36	20	68	28	4	25	10	32		
Psy Opera	Scheduled: TBA; Label: Formats:	-	-	-	-	-	-	-	-	-	-		
"—" denotes a recording that did not chart or was not released in that territory.

=== Remix albums ===
List of remix albums, with selected details
Title	Details
Miss Anthropocene (Rave Edition)	Released: January 1, 2021; Formats: Digital download, streaming

=== DJ mixes ===
List of DJ mixes, with selected details
Title	Details
This Story Is Dedicated to All Those Cyberpunks Who Fight Against Injustice and Corruption Every Day of Their Lives!	Released: December 11, 2020; Formats: streaming

== Extended plays ==
List of extended plays, with selected details
Title	Details
Lethe	Released: December 18, 2007; Label: Self-released; Format: Digital download
Darkbloom (with d'Eon)	Released: April 18, 2011; Label: Arbutus, Hippos in Tanks; Formats: CD, 12", digital download
Ambrosia (Note: Ambrosia was released as a bonus EP with the Rough Trade exclusive edition of Visions.)	Released: November 30, 2012; Label: 4AD; Formats: CD

== Singles ==
=== As lead artist ===
List of singles as lead artist, showing year released, selected chart positions, certifications, and originating album
Title	Year	Peak chart positions										Certifications	Album
Title	Year	CAN Rock	AUS Hit.	BEL (FL) Tip	MEX Air.	NZ Hot	POR	SCO	UK	US Electro	US Rock	Certifications	Album
"Genesis"	2012	—	—	—	44	—	—	—	—	—	—	BPI: Gold; RIAA: Gold; RMNZ: Platinum	Visions
"Go" (featuring Blood Diamonds)	2014	—	10	—	—	—	—	—	190	22	—		Non-album singles
"Entropy" (with Bleachers)	2015	—	—	—	—	—	—	—	—	—	—		Non-album singles
"Flesh Without Blood"	2015	46	7	84	43	—	—	—	—	18	23		Art Angels
"Kill V. Maim"	2016	—	—	— (Note: "Kill V. Maim" did not enter the Flanders Ultratop 50, but charted as an "extra tip" on the Ultratip chart.)	—	—	—	—	—	—	—		Art Angels
"We Appreciate Power" (featuring Hana)	2018	—	—	—	13	35	—	69	— (Note: "We Appreciate Power" did not enter the UK Singles Chart, but peaked at number 94 on the UK Singles Downloads Chart.)	—	40		Miss Anthropocene
"Violence" (with i_o)	2019	—	—	— (Note: "Violence" did not enter the Flanders Ultratop 50, but charted as an "extra tip" on the Ultratip chart.)	48	31	—	—	—	19	—		Miss Anthropocene
"So Heavy I Fell Through the Earth"	2019	—	—	—	—	—	—	—	—	18	—		Miss Anthropocene
"My Name Is Dark"	2019	—	—	—	—	—	—	—	—	22	—		Miss Anthropocene
"4ÆM"	2019	—	—	—	—	—	—	—	—	18	—		Miss Anthropocene
"Delete Forever"	2020	—	—	—	—	—	—	—	—	14	—		Miss Anthropocene
"Player of Games"	2021	—	—	—	—	—	—	—	—	19	—		Non-album singles
"Shinigami Eyes"	2022	—	—	—	—	19	48	—	—	12	36		Non-album singles
"Welcome to the Opera" (with Anyma)	2023	—	—	—	—	—	—	—	—	35	—		Genesys
"I Wanna Be Software" (with Illangelo)	2023	—	—	—	—	—	—	—	—	—	—		Non-album singles
"Nothing Lasts Forever" (with Sevdaliza)	2023	—	—	—	—	—	—	—	—	—	—		Non-album singles
"Image" (Grimes Special) (with Magdalena Bay)	2024	—	—	—	—	—	—	—	—	—	—		Non-album singles
"IDGAF"	2025	—	—	—	—	—	—	—	—	—	—		Non-album singles
"Artificial Angels"	2025	—	—	—	—	—	—	—	—	—	—		Non-album singles
"Sign From God" (with Cobrah)	2026	—	—	—	—	—	—	—	—	—	—		Non-album singles
"Accelerando" (with Vadakin)	2026	—	—	—	—	30	—	—	—	—	—		Psy Opera
"—" denotes a recording that did not chart or was not released in that territory.

=== As featured artist ===
List of singles and peak chart positions
Title	Year	Peak chart positions						Album
Title	Year	BEL (FL)	BEL (WA)	NZ Hot	UK	US R&B	US Rock	Album
"Phone Sex" (Blood Diamonds featuring Grimes)	2012	—	—	—	—	—	—	Non-album single
"Pynk" (Janelle Monáe featuring Grimes)	2018	— (Note: "Pynk" did not enter the Flanders Ultratop 50, but charted as an "extra tip" on the Ultratip chart.)	— (Note: "Pynk" did not enter the Wallonie Ultratop 50, but charted as an "extra tip" on the Ultratip chart.)	—	—	21	—	Dirty Computer
"Love4eva" (Loona yyxy featuring Grimes)	2018	—	—	—	—	—	—	Beauty & the Beat
"Nihilist Blues" (Bring Me the Horizon featuring Grimes)	2019	—	—	29	77	—	45	Amo
"Cry" (Ashnikko featuring Grimes)	2020	—	—	37	—	—	—	Demidevil
"Entwined" (Sub Focus featuring Grimes)	2025	—	—	4	— (Note: "Entwined" did not enter the UK Singles Chart, but peaked at number 62 on the UK Singles Sales Chart.)	—	—	Contact
"Miku-Maxxing" (with Hatsune Miku and SatapanP)	2026	—	—	—	—	—	—	Beyond Borders Vol.1: Emerge Mode Miku
"—" denotes a recording that did not chart or was not released in that territory.

=== Promotional singles ===
List of promotional singles, showing year released, chart positions, certifications, and originating album
Title	Year	Peak chart positions			Certifications	Album
Title	Year	IRE	MEX Air.	US Electro	Certifications	Album
"Oblivion"	2012	92	39	—	BPI: Gold; RIAA: Gold; RMNZ: Platinum	Visions
"Realiti"	2015	—	—	30		Art Angels
"Scream" (featuring Aristophanes)	2015	—	—	—		Art Angels
"Pretty Dark"	2019	—	—	—		Non-album single
"—" denotes a recording that did not chart or was not released in that territory.

== Other charted songs ==
List of other charted songs, showing year released, chart positions, and originating album
Title	Year	Peak chart positions				Album
Title	Year	BEL (FL)	NZ Hot	US Electro	US Rock	Album
"Medieval Warfare"	2016	—	—	—	24	Suicide Squad: The Album
"Darkseid" (with 潘PAN)	2020	—	—	31	—	Miss Anthropocene
"New Gods"	2020	—	—	34	—	Miss Anthropocene
"You'll Miss Me When I'm Not Around"	2020	— (Note: "You'll Miss Me When I'm Not Around" did not enter the Flanders Ultratop 50, but charted as an "extra tip" on the Ultratip chart.)	36	10	—	Miss Anthropocene
"Before the Fever"	2020	—	—	41	—	Miss Anthropocene
"Idoru"	2020	—	—	27	—	Miss Anthropocene
"Sheesh" (Benee featuring Grimes)	2020	—	12	—	—	Hey U X
"—" denotes a recording that did not chart.

== Guest appearances ==
List of guest appearances, showing year released, and originating album
Title	Year	Other artist(s)	Album
"Golden Calf"	2013	Doldrums	Lesser Evil
"Take Me Away"	2014	Bleachers	Strange Desire
"Heaven"	2015	Troye Sivan, Betty Who	Blue Neighbourhood
"Dark Come Soon"	2017	Hana	Tegan and Sara Present The Con X: Covers
"The Medicine Does Not Control Me"	2018	Jimmy Urine	Euringer
"Play Destroy"	2018	Poppy	Am I a Girl?
"Delicate Weapon"	2020	None	Cyberpunk 2077: Radio, Vol. 2 (Original Soundtrack)
"Last Day / Новый День"	2022	IC3PEAK	Kiss of Death
"No Man's Land"	2022	Bella Poarch	Dolls
"Fly to You"	2023	Caroline Polachek, Dido	Desire, I Want to Turn Into You
"MachineGirl"	2025	Adéla	The Provocateur
"Face The Flame"	2026	Yeat, Youngboy Never Broke Again	ADL
"New Solution"	2026	Matt Proxy	Trojan Horse

== Music videos ==
List of music videos as lead artist, showing year released, and directors
Title	Year	Director(s)	Ref.
"Vanessa"	2011	Grimes and John Londono	
"Crystal Ball"	2011	Tim Kelly	
"Oblivion"	2012	Emily Kai Bock and Grimes	
"Nightmusic" (featuring Majical Cloudz)	2012	John Londono	
"Genesis"	2012	Grimes	
"Go" (featuring Blood Diamonds)	2014	Roco-Prime (Grimes and Mac Boucher)	
"Realiti"	2015	Grimes	
"Flesh Without Blood/Life in the Vivid Dream"	2015	Grimes	
"Kill V. Maim"	2016	Grimes and Mac Boucher	
"California"	2016	Grimes and Mac Boucher	
"Butterfly"	2016	Grimes and Mac Boucher	
"World Princess Part II"	2016	Grimes and Mac Boucher	
"Scream" (featuring Aristophanes)	2016	Grimes and Mac Boucher	
"Belly of the Beat"	2016	Grimes and Mac Boucher	
"Venus Fly" (featuring Janelle Monáe)	2017	Grimes	
"Violence" (featuring I_o)	2019	Grimes	
"Delete Forever"	2020	Grimes	
"Idoru"	2020	Grimes	
"You'll Miss Me When I'm Not Around"	2020	Mac Boucher	
"Player Of Games"	2021	Anton Tammi	
"Shinigami Eyes"	2022	BRTHR	
"So Heavy I Fell Through the Earth"	2024	Grimes	
"Artificial Angels"	2025	Grimes	
"Miku-Maxxing"	2026	eternalusa	
"Accelerando"	2026	Cho Giseok	
