= List of awards and nominations received by Grimes =

Grimes awards and nominations
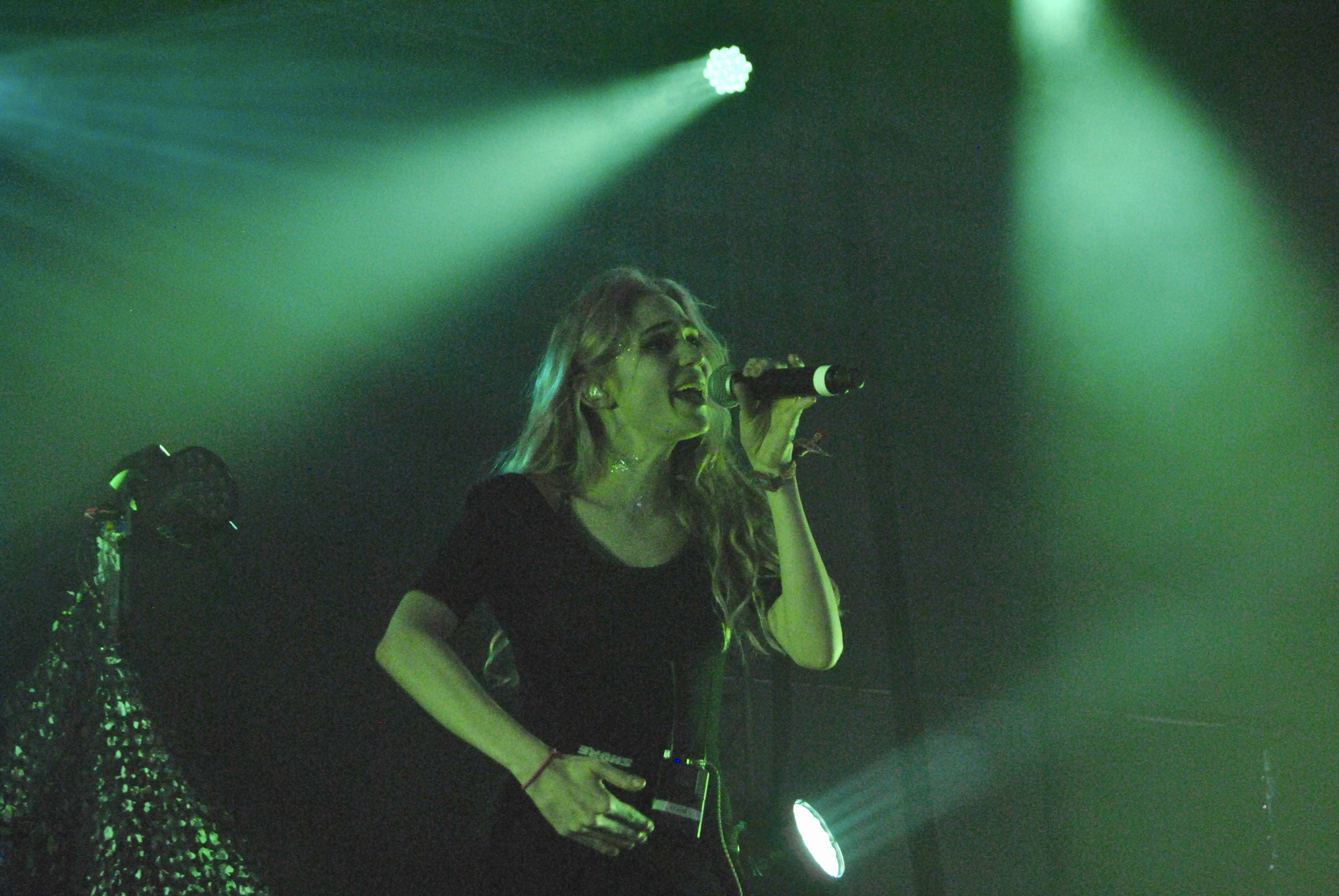
- Grimes performing at the Governors Ball in 2014
Awards and nominations
Award	Wins	Nominations
A2IM Libera Awards	1	1
Antville Music Video Awards	0	3
Bazaar Women of the Year	1	1
Canadian Independent Music Awards	0	1
iHeartRadio MMVAs	1	9
International Dance Music Awards	0	2
Juno Awards	4	5
NME Awards	0	3
Polaris Music Prize	0	2
UK Music Video Awards	0	1
Webby Awards	1	2

Totals (Note: Certain award groups do not simply award one winner. They acknowledge several different recipients, have runners-up, and have third place. Since this is a specific recognition and is different from losing an award, runner-up mentions are considered wins in this award tally. For simplification and to avoid errors, each award in this list has been presumed to have had a prior nomination.)
- Wins: 8
- Nominations: 32

Grimes is a Canadian singer, songwriter, record producer and visual artist. She has received various awards and nominations for her work in each of the aforementioned fields. Grimes rose to prominence in the early 2010s, receiving multiple honors for her work as a recording artist. Her third studio album, Visions (2012), won Electronic Album of the Year at the Juno Awards of 2013, and she received many nominations for her work as a director on the video for the album's promotional single "Oblivion", and further nominations for the videos for Visions single "Genesis" and non-album single "Go". She continued to receive honors with the release of her fourth studio album, Art Angels (2015), winning Video of the Year for "Kill V. Maim" and "Venus Fly", at the Juno Awards of 2017 and 2018, respectively.

== A2IM Libera Awards ==
The A2IM Libera Awards are dedicated to celebrating independent musicians across all genres, created by Richard James Burgess. Grimes has received one award.

Year	Nominee / work	Award	Result	Ref.
2016	"Kill V. Maim"	Video of the Year	Won	

== AIM Independent Music Awards ==
The AIM Independent Music Awards are a UK-based ceremony celebrating the best in independent music

Year	Nominee / work	Award	Result	Ref.
2016	"Kill V. Maim"	Independent Video of the Year	Nominated	

== Antville Music Video Awards ==
The Antville Music Video Awards are annual online awards that recognize the best music videos of the past year. Grimes has received three nominations.

Year	Nominee / work	Award	Result	Ref.
2012	"Oblivion"	Video of the Year	Nominated	
2012	"Oblivion"	Best choreography	Nominated	
2012	"Oblivion"	Best performance	Nominated	

== Berlin Music Video Awards ==
The Berlin Music Video Awards (BMVA) is a festival and networking event for filmmakers, directors, artists, musicians, and music video fans held annually in Berlin, Germany. The four-day event consists of music video marathons, live performances, DJ sets, various workshops, and fashion. The BMVA highlights that anyone can participate - quality, originality and diversity will be rewarded.

Year	Nominee / work	Award	Result	Ref.
2022	"Player of Games"	Best Cinematography	Nominated	

== Best Art Vinyl ==
The Best Art Vinyl award has been awarded since 2005 by Art Vinyl Ltd for the best album artwork of the past year. The award is judged by public vote from a list of 50 nominations from music industry and graphic design experts.

Year	Nominee / work	Award	Result	Ref.
2020	Miss Anthropocene	Best Vinyl Art	Nominated	

== Harper's Bazaar Women of the Year Awards ==
The Harper's Bazaar Women of the Year Awards are held to celebrate women in fashion. Grimes has received one award.

Year	Nominee / work	Award	Result	Ref.
2016	Grimes	Musician of the Year 2016	Won	

== Canadian Independent Music Awards ==
The Canadian Independent Music Awards are held to celebrate Canadian and International independent musicians, held during Canadian Music Week. Grimes has received one nomination.

Year	Nominee / work	Award	Result	Ref.
2017	"Flesh Without Blood"	Single of the Year	Nominated	

== GAFFA Awards ==
The GAFFA Awards (Danish: GAFFA Prisen) have been awarded since 1991 by Danish magazine of the same name in the field of popular music.

Year	Nominee / work	Award	Result	Ref.
2021	Herself	Best International Solo Act	Nominated	
2021	Miss Anthropocene	Best International Album	Nominated	

== Hungarian Music Awards ==
The Hungarian Music Awards is the national music awards of Hungary, held every year since 1992 and promoted by Mahasz.

Year	Nominee / work	Award	Result
2021	Miss Anthropocene	Best Foreign Electronic Album	Nominated

== iHeartRadio Much Music Video Awards ==
The iHeartRadio Much Music Video Awards are annual awards presented by the Canadian television channel Much to honour the year's best music videos. Grimes has received won award from nine nominations.

Year	Nominee / work	Award	Result	Ref.
2013	"Genesis"	Dance Video of the Year	Nominated	
2015	"Go"	Video of the Year	Nominated	
2015	"Go"	Best Post-Production	Nominated	
2015	"Go"	Best Director	Nominated	
2016	"Flesh Without Blood"	Video of the Year	Nominated	
2016	"Flesh Without Blood"	Best Director	Nominated	
2017	"Venus Fly" (featuring Janelle Monáe)	Best EDM/Dance Video	Won	
2017	"Venus Fly" (featuring Janelle Monáe)	Best Pop Video	Nominated	
2017	"Venus Fly" (featuring Janelle Monáe)	Fan Fave Video	Nominated	

== International Dance Music Awards ==
The International Dance Music Awards are held as a part of the Winter Music Conference in Miami Beach, Florida to recognize and honor exceptional achievements in 57 award categories. Grimes has received two nominations.

Year	Nominee / work	Award	Result	Ref.
2016	"Flesh Without Blood"	Best Alternative/Indie Rock Dance Track	Nominated	
2016	Grimes	Best Breakthrough Artist (Solo)	Nominated	

== Juno Awards ==
The Juno Awards are held annually to celebrate the best of Canadian musicians. Grimes has won four awards from five nominations.

Year	Nominee / work	Award	Result	Ref.
2013	Visions	Electronic Album of the Year	Won	
2013	Grimes	Breakthrough Artist of the Year	Won	
2017	Art Angels	Alternative Album of the Year	Nominated	
2017	Art Angels	Recording Package of the Year	Nominated	
2017	"Kill V. Maim"	Video of the Year	Won	
2018	"Venus Fly"	Video of the Year	Won	
2023	"Shinigami Eyes"	Dance Recording of the Year	Nominated	

== mtvU Woodie Awards ==
Year	Nominee / work	Award	Result	Ref.
2013	Grimes	Woodie of the Year	Nominated	

== NME Awards ==
The NME Awards are an annual music awards show in the United Kingdom, founded by the music magazine NME. Grimes has been nominated for five awards.

Year	Nominee / work	Award	Result	Ref.
2013	Grimes	Best Solo Artist	Nominated	
2013	"Oblivion"	Best Music Video	Nominated	
2014	actuallygrimes.tumblr.com	Best Band Blog or Twitter	Nominated	
2016	Grimes	Best International Solo Artist	Nominated	
2016	Art Angels	Best Album	Nominated	

== Polaris Music Prize ==
The Polaris Music Prize is a music award annually given to the best full-length Canadian album based on artistic merit, regardless of genre, sales, or record label. Grimes has been nominated twice.

Year	Nominee / work	Award	Result	Ref.
2012	Visions	Best Canada Album of 2012	Nominated	
2016	Art Angels	Best Canada Album of 2016	Nominated	

== Rober Awards Music Prize ==
Year	Nominee / work	Award	Result	Ref.
2020	Herself	Best Pop Artist	Nominated	

== UK Music Video Awards ==
The UK Music Video Awards is an annual celebration of the best in music video. Grimes has received two nominations.

Year	Nominee / work	Award	Result	Ref.
2012	"Oblivion"	Best Alternative Video - International	Nominated	
2020	"Cry" (with Ashnikko)	Best Pop Video - UK	Nominated	

== Webby Awards ==
The Webby Awards is an award for excellence on the Internet presented annually by The International Academy of Digital Arts and Sciences. Grimes has received one award from two nominations.

Year	Nominee / work	Award	Result	Ref.
2013	Grimes	Artist of the Year	Won	
2017	Art Angel (Documentary)	Online Film & Video - Music	Nominated	
