= Darkbloom =

Darkbloom may refer to:

- Darkbloom (album), a 2022 album by We Came as Romans
- Darkbloom (EP), a 2011 EP by Grimes and d'Eon
