= Jaime Brooks =

Canadian-American musician (born 1984)

- Born: May 5, 1984 (age 42)
- Genres: Electronic; pop; breakbeat; experimental; ambient
- Occupations: Musician; songwriter; record producer
- Instruments: Vocals; keyboard; piano; guitar; bass; harmonica
- Years active: 2009–present
- Website: https://jaimebrooks.substack.com/

Jaime Brooks (born May 5, 1984) is a Canadian-American songwriter and musician currently based in Vancouver. She began releasing solo music in 2013 with her first EP Stop Pretending, followed by her debut album Magical Pessimism 2014 (2014). In 2019 and 2020 she released Main Pop Girl 2019 and Pain Mop Girl 2020, respectively, with the latter being a remix album of the former.

She was also one half of electronic music duo Elite Gymnastics with musician and visual artist Joshua Clancy. After Clancy's departure from the project in 2012, Brooks renamed the then-solo effort to Dead Girlfriends and then renamed it to Default Genders following a controversy around the name. In 2022, Brooks revived the Elite Gymnastics name and released Snow Flakes 2022.

Brooks also hosts an independent online newsletter via Substack, The Seat of Loss, in which she writes articles concerning music, culture, and technology.

== Career ==
=== 2009–2013: Elite Gymnastics ===
Elite Gymnastics
- Origin: Minneapolis, Minnesota, U.S.
- Genres: Electronic; techno; house; breakbeat; drum and bass; rave; chillout
- Years active: 2009–2013
- Label: Acéphale
- Past members: Jaime Brooks (credited under deadname); Joshua Clancy
- Website: elitegymnastics.tumblr.com

Elite Gymnastics was an electronic music duo from Minneapolis, Minnesota and later a solo project from Vancouver, British Columbia self-described as a "multimedia art project." Formed by Brooks in Minneapolis around 2009, original lineups consisted of various local musicians in the Minneapolis area and eventually settled as a duo of Jaime Brooks and Joshua Clancy. They self-released several EPs and mixtapes before Clancy's departure in 2012.

As a duo they released seven EPs on which Brooks handled most of the songwriting and musical production duties while Clancy handled the album artwork: Real Friends, Neu! '92, Gizzard Greens V.1, Gizzard Greens V.2, RUIN (and its B-side, RUIN 2), RUIN 3, and RUIN 4. Gizzard Greens is a digital double EP in the style of a remix album (though the two volumes were released individually in 2010 and 2011) featuring a cover of Cheryl Cole's "Parachute" and a mashup combining Sub Focus' remix of Rusko's "Hold On" (featuring Amber Coffman) with Blame's "Piano Takes You" on the first volume, and bootleg remixes of Lady Gaga's "Poker Face" and Waka Flocka Flame's "Fuck the Club Up" (featuring Pastor Troy and Slim Dunkin) on the second.

The RUIN EP was reviewed favorably by Pitchfork magazine earning a 7.8 album review rating and critical acclaim among a number of smaller publications, quickly attracting an online cult following. RUIN saw physical release as a vinyl record under the electronic label Acéphale, featuring five remixed versions of its A-side tracks for its B-side (RUIN 2). Previous albums were self-released online in digital format and made available for free download through their Tumblr-based imprint Psychedelic Surf Club. RUIN and RUIN 2 were later self-released in similar fashion as a digital double EP. Though largely a remix album, RUIN 4 features "Life/Trap" and "We Got Lost" as two previously unreleased tracks which didn't make it onto the original RUIN EP, and a rerecorded version of RUIN's "Little Things" as a hidden track.

The name Elite Gymnastics is a nod to the lyrics of "Ruthless Babysitting" by power electronics group Whitehouse.

==== Josh Clancy's departure ====
Following a 2012 tour as a supporting act for Sleigh Bells, Elite Gymnastics became Brooks' solo project with Clancy parting ways after a reportedly tumultuous experience on the road. "Our personal relationship is kinda kaput for the time being," Brooks describes in a Tumblr post detailing some of the reasons for continuing the project solo. Brooks continued the project solo, relocating to Vancouver following a stint in New York City, releasing the single "Andreja 4-Ever" as part of the Adult Swim Singles Program the same year.

The solo form of Elite Gymnastics only saw the release of single "Andreja 4-Ever" and a couple of remixes (for Sky Ferreira and How to Dress Well) before Brooks decided to rename the project; first to Dead Girlfriends, then to Default Genders.

=== 2013–2014: Default Genders ===
Default Genders
- Origin: Vancouver, British Columbia, Canada
- Genres: Electronic; pop; breakbeat; ambient; experimental
- Years active: 2013–present
- Members: Jaime Brooks
- Website: magicalpessimism.bandcamp.com

==== Dead Girlfriends and "On Fraternity" controversy ====
The release of single "On Fraternity" from the debut EP Stop Pretending caused a substantial amount of controversy. "On Fraternity" is a noisy electronic track with lyrics concerning sexual assault and rape culture, inspired by her then-partner Grimes' own song "Oblivion" which also addresses sexual assault. Pitchfork reviewed the track positively and awarded it "Best New Track" which caught the attention of other writers who took issue with Brooks (who still identified as a cisgender male) speaking on feminist topics in their music alongside the provocative moniker "Dead Girlfriends." Claire Lobenfeld for Stereogum harshly criticized the song as "mansplaining" the issue of sexual assault back to women, finding its blunt lyrics and disaffected delivery condescending. The discourse culminated into an online round table discussion about male privilege in music and feminist discourse by Spin magazine. Brooks initially defended the song and name choice on their personal Tumblr, but later admitted to seeing the song as a failure.

Though the name "Dead Girlfriends" was inspired by a quote from feminist writer Andrea Dworkin, they admitted it was a "terrible name" that gave the wrong impression: "The idea of a white indie guy using feminism as a way to get over in the industry I think horrified a lot of people. And that idea horrifies me." Brooks rechristened the project to Default Genders shortly thereafter.

The full EP was released July 29, 2013 for digital download via Bandcamp and SoundCloud, with no physical release. Pitchfork rated the EP a 6.6, and Mark Richardson gave it a lukewarm review, complimenting its intimate and eclectic production, but finding its lyrics to be on-the-nose, though undoubtedly "straightforward and sincere."

In March 2013, they released a lo-fi cover of "Ours" by Taylor Swift as a gift to Grimes for her twenty-fifth birthday.

In 2014, she released the debut Default Genders full-length album Magical Pessimism 2014 which features eight original songs as well as remastered versions of the four Stop Pretending tracks. The artwork for both Stop Pretending and Magical Pessimism 2014 feature an illustration by Grimes. Pitchfork rated the album less positively than the EP at a score of 5.6, with Ian Cohen writing that the album "often substitutes accusation for empathy, conviction for coherence, and straw men for actual people to the point where you wonder whether Brooks’ intentions are to draw attention to the problem or just [their] own moral superiority."

The Stop Pretending EP was also renamed later to stop pretending 2013 to match the naming convention of subsequent Default Genders and Elite Gymnastics releases.

=== 2015–2018: Eponymity ===
During a four-year period following relocation to Los Angeles, California, Brooks released a series of demos and bootleg remixes on SoundCloud eponymously, though they were not made available for purchase or download.

=== 2019-2020: Default Genders ===
==== Main Pop Girl 2019 ====
On February 4, 2019, Brooks released a second full-length Default Genders album titled Main Pop Girl 2019, which includes a track featuring pop artist No Rome, updated versions of demos previously released eponymously, and an updated version of "Sophie" from Magical Pessimism 2014 featuring artist Beth Sawlts. The album was reviewed favorably by Pitchfork, receiving an 8.0 rating.

==== Pain Mop Girl 2020 ====
On April 20, 2020, Brooks released a new full-length Default Genders album titled Pain Mop Girl 2020, which consists mostly of guest-remixed and reworked versions of Main Pop Girl 2019 songs, and features two original songs as the opening tracks.

==== Main Pop Girls 2015–2018 ====
On December 4, 2020, Brooks released a collection of demos as an album titled Main Pop Girls 2015–2018 which consists of an unreleased song as the opening track and songs previously showcased eponymously as SoundCloud demos during 2015–2018, many of which laid the groundwork for material on subsequent Default Genders albums.

=== 2022: Elite Gymnastics revival ===
In 2021, Brooks announced a reconciliation with Clancy and revealed intentions to revive the Elite Gymnastics name with his blessing, though ultimately not his involvement. A debut album, Snow Flakes 2022 (stylized in all-lowercase) was released on October 18, 2022 (the only prior commercial release under the name, RUIN, being considered a double EP). The album consists of reworks of previously recorded songs as well as new material, with the new lineup of Jaime Brooks and Viri Char.

== Private life ==
Brooks is transgender and uses she and they as personal pronouns. They were in a relationship with Canadian musician Grimes from 2013 to 2018.

== Discography ==
=== Elite Gymnastics ===
==== Full lengths ====
- snow flakes 2022 (2022)

==== Extended plays ====
- Real Friends (2010)
- Gizzard Greens V.1 (2010)
- Gizzard Greens V.2 (2011)
- Neu! '92 (2011)
- RUIN (2011)
- RUIN 2 (2011)
- RUIN 3 (2012)
- RUIN 4 (2012)

==== Singles ====
- "We Fly High (Original Version)" (2009)
- "Life/Trap" (2012)
- "Andreja 4-Ever" (2012)

==== Unreleased songs ====
- "Real Love (The Hedgehog's Dilemma)" (2010)
- "I Just Wasn't Paying Attention" (2011)
- "Walls" (2011)

Note: "I Just Wasn't Paying Attention" is an early version of "We Got Lost" from RUIN 4.

==== Remixes ====
- Florrie – "Come Back to Mine (Elite Gymnastics Remix)" (2010)
- How to Dress Well – "Suicide Dream 2 (Elite Gymnastics Baptism)" (2011)
- Mozart Parties – "Where Has Everybody Gone? (Elite Gymnastics Remix)" (2011)
- Korallreven feat. Julianna Barwick – "Sa Sa Samoa (Elite Gymnastics Remix)" (2012)
- Sky Ferreira – "Red Lips (Elite Gymnastics Remix)" (2013)
- How to Dress Well – "& It Was U (Elite Gymnastics Remix)" (2013)

==== Mixtapes ====
- Mix for VnFold Magazine (2010)
- Mix for Opening Ceremony (2011)
- All We Fucking Care About is Kpop Whitehouse and Our Cats (Mix for Forty Ounce Clothing, 2011)
- I Want a 38-Minute Truce in Which There is No Rape (Mix for DIS Magazine, 2011)

=== Default Genders ===
==== Full lengths ====
- magical pessimism 2014 (2014)
- main pop girl 2019 (2019)
- pain mop girl 2020 (2020)

==== Extended plays ====
- stop pretending (2013)

==== Singles ====
- "on fraternity" (2013)

==== Mixtapes ====
- magical pessimix #1 (2014)

=== Jaime Brooks ===
==== Full lengths ====
- main pop girls 2015–2018 (the demos) (2020)
