= Shinigami Eyes =

Shinigami eyes or Shinigami Eyes may refer to:

- Shinigami eyes, a plot device in the manga Death Note
- The eyes of shinigami, creatures in Japanese culture and religion
- "Shinigami Eyes" (song), by Grimes, 2022
- A browser addon meant to help identify transphobic and trans-friendly social networks and users by highlighting them with different colours.
