= Visions (Grimes album) =

2012 studio album by Grimes

Studio album by Grimes
- Released: February 21, 2012
- Recorded: August 2011
- Studios: La Brique Studio Space, Montreal
- Genres: Synth-pop; electropop; art pop; dream pop
- Length: 48:04
- Labels: 4AD; Arbutus
- Producer: Grimes

Grimes chronology
| Darkbloom (2011) | Visions (2012) | Art Angels (2015) |

Singles from Visions
- 1. "Genesis" Released: January 9, 2012

Visions is the third studio album by Canadian musician Grimes. It was released on February 21, 2012, through 4AD. Her first since signing with 4AD, the album was recorded entirely on Apple's GarageBand software in Grimes' apartment over a three-week period. It was mixed by Grimes and her manager, Sebastian Cowan, at their La Brique Studio Space in Montreal. Visions was streamed on the NPR website a week before it was released in the United States.

Visions was acclaimed by music critics and was included in several year-end lists. The album's two singles, "Oblivion" and "Genesis", were named among the best songs of 2012 by many publications including Rolling Stone, Pitchfork and NME. It has also appeared on several decade-end lists, with Gorilla vs. Bear naming it the best album of the decade and Pitchfork naming "Oblivion" as the second best song of the decade. It was also ranked as the 252nd best album of all time by NME. Visions won a Juno Award and was also nominated for the 2012 Polaris Music Prize.

Visions is labeled as bringing the DIY music scene of the Mile End neighbourhood of Montreal to international popularity.

== Background and recording ==
I was stuck in this horrible cycle of not living anywhere, just not having any concrete sense of well-being or stability or home. That was really interesting, but that fuelled a lot of the emotional momentum of the album.

— Grimes

Claire Boucher released her debut album as Grimes, Geidi Primes on Canadian record label Arbutus Records in January 2010, followed by Halfaxa, in October of the same year. Shortly after, she began publicly promoting Grimes and started touring beyond Montreal. In 2011, she released a split 12" EP with fellow Montreal based musician d'Eon, Darkbloom and, beginning in May, opened for Swedish singer Lykke Li on her North American Tour, and the following August her debut album was re-released through No Pain in Pop Records, in CD and vinyl format for the first time.

Growing frustrated with touring and a lack of stability in her life, Boucher began work on Visions in August 2011 over three weeks at her home in Montreal. While under a release deadline set before she had started the album by her then manager, she recorded the album at a "psychotic pace", not sleeping or eating for nine days while using amphetamines to meet the deadline. Most songs on the album were finished in a single day, without many demos being created beforehand. She described the process as being "equally enjoyable and tortuous". She created the album hoping to "clear [her] mental slate. Overriding everything I’d done previously, too" stating the album "is a pretty good representation of the beginning of the future.” Visions was recorded using Apple's GarageBand, primarily using a Roland Juno-G keyboard, vocal pedals, and a sampler. The album was mixed by Boucher and Sebastian Cowan at their La Brique Studio Space. She signed with record label 4AD in January 2012.

== Composition ==
Musically, the album has been described as synth-pop, electropop, art pop, dream pop, dance-pop, experimental, and alternative pop. According to Eleanor Kagan of NPR, "Its dreamy, psychedelic dance-pop songs beg for the subwoofer to be turned all the way up." According to Rolling Stone, [Grimes] did more than anyone this year to stoke the hot romance between R&B and dream pop."

== Release and promotion ==
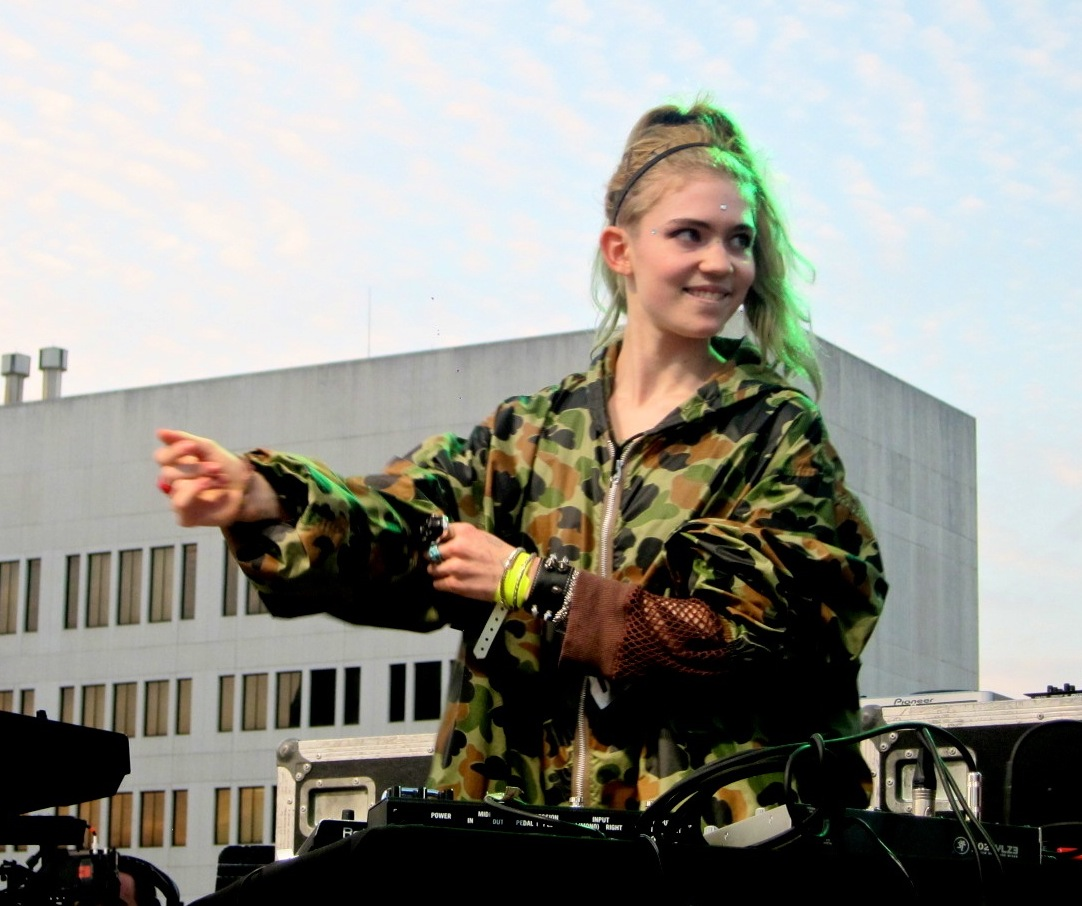
Grimes performing at SXSW in 2012.

Visions was released on February 21, 2012. Worldwide releases followed throughout March. The album was streamed on the NPR website a week before it was released in the United States. The Canadian vinyl version of the album featured a different track listing; it featured 9 songs, including two previously unreleased songs "Life After Death" and "Ambrosia". "Oblivion" was released onto the Internet in October 2011 as a promotional single, along with the announcement of the album. "Genesis" was issued as the lead single on January 9, 2012.

The album debuted at No. 98 on the Billboard 200 albums chart on its first week of release. It also debuted at No. 8 on the Top Dance/Electronic Albums chart. As of December 2015, the album has sold 110,000 copies in the US. It has sold over 150,000 units. In 2012 it was awarded a silver certification from the Independent Music Companies Association which indicated sales of at least 20,000 copies throughout Europe.

In November 2012, with the announcement that Visions was named album of the year by record shops Rough Trade and Resident, two exclusive bonus discs were made available with any purchase of the album in each shop, featuring remixes and rare tracks.

=== Visuals ===
The music video for "Oblivion", directed by Emily Kai Bock, was shot in Montreal at Olympic Stadium and at McGill University's Molson Stadium, during a football game and a motocross rally. The video debuted on March 2, 2012, and shows Grimes amongst shirtless frat boys, as well as in a men's locker room surrounded by weightlifting athletes. "Art gives me an outlet where I can be aggressive in a world where I usually can't be, and part of it was asserting this abstract female power in these male-dominated arenas—the video is somewhat about objectifying men. Not in a disrespectful way, though", Grimes explained. In an interview with Spin, she revealed that the song is about "going into this masculine world that is associated with sexual assault, but presented as something really welcoming and nice. The song's sort of about being—I was assaulted and I had a really hard time engaging in any types of relationship with men, because I was just so terrified of men for a while."

The video for "Nightmusic" was directed by John Londono and premiered on May 10, 2012. It takes place in a "barren, greywashed" landscape, and features Grimes wearing one of the "pussy rings" she designed in collaboration with Montreal-based jeweler and sculptor Morgan Black.

The self-directed video for "Genesis" premiered on August 22, 2012. It was filmed in Los Angeles and co-stars rapper and stripper Brooke Candy, whom Grimes describes as "a very contemporary muse". In the video, Grimes is seen alongside a group of friends while driving an Escalade in the desert, holding an albino python in the back of a limousine, and posing in the woods. She said of the concept of the video: "It's loosely based on this painting by my favorite painter, Hieronymus Bosch, called The Seven Deadly Sins and the Four Last Things. I wanted to play with Medieval/Catholic imagery. I was raised in a Catholic household and went to a Catholic school, and my childhood brain perceived medieval Catholicism as an action movie: There's this crazy omnipresent guy who can destroy you at any moment."

Visions' album cover was designed by Grimes herself and took her fourteen hours while she watched films like Silence of the Lambs, The Shining, and Enter the Void. Of the artwork, Grimes said “I think it’s technically proficient, super intense, laid out well, and it has a lot of meaning. It seems so agonized.” About the meaning of the cover, she stated that “It represents based, disgusting dead humanity in the most basic form...this idea of death no one understands but everyone is obsessed with.” The line across the top reads "I love" in Russian. The two vertical lines of text below resemble Japanese kanji but do not actually mean anything. The right side of the cover art contains a block of purple text which is the word 'Grimes' repeated in a grid pattern. In the top right, there are the first two lines of the poem "But Listen, I Am Warning You" by Anna Akhmatova. The bottom right features lines from another poem by Anna Akmatova, "A Song of the Final Meeting".

== Critical reception ==
Professional ratings
Aggregate scores
| Source | Rating |
|---|---|
| AnyDecentMusic? | 7.6/10 |
| Metacritic | 80/100 |
Review scores
| Source | Rating |
| AllMusic | 5/5 stars |
| The A.V. Club | A− |
| Clash | 8/10 |
| Entertainment Weekly | B+ |
| The Guardian | 4/5 stars |
| NME | 8/10 |
| Pitchfork | 8.5/10 |
| PopMatters | 8/10 |
| Rolling Stone | 3/5 stars |
| Spin | 7/10 |

Visions received critical acclaim. At Metacritic, which assigns a weighted mean rating out of 100 to reviews from mainstream critics, the album received an average score of 80, based on 42 reviews, which indicates "widespread acclaim". Lindsay Zoladz of Pitchfork awarded the album a "Best New Music" designation, claiming it "showcases a streamlined aesthetic, resulting in a statement that feels focused, cohesive, and assured. It's simple enough to leave room for Grimes to grow, but this thing is so compulsively listenable it's hard to come away from it wanting much more". The A.V. Club's Evan Rytlewski commented that on Visions, Grimes "continues her march toward accessibility, rendering hazy, quixotic sketches into tangible, hook-heavy electro-pop". Jon Caramanica of The New York Times hailed Visions as "one of the most impressive albums of the year so far". Rebecca Nicholson of The Guardian described Visions as a "smart, funny album, and it's almost impossible not to dance to it". Clash's Matthew Bennett wrote, "With 4AD's renewed vigor in all affairs electronique and Boucher's coherent elevation in both song quality and hook there'll be no stopping this creative, sensual explosion of humanity called Grimes." Benjamin Boles of Now called the album "richly textured and inventive", noting that "while Visions is unmistakably 2012 sonically in its references to R&B and hip-hop, it also fits remarkably gracefully into 4AD's impressive back catalogue of dream pop". According to Priya Elan of NME, "Visions goes beyond electropop. Melody isn’t king here. Instead, tunes flap and flit in the wind, sunny and sinister, like a grinning Jolly Roger run up a mast."

Matt James of PopMatters praised the album as "an absolute blast" and opined, "Sure, it could have done without some of the interludes [...] but its overall sense of ambition is intoxicating. Visions' rebellious contrariness to evade classification is part of the design and certainly part of the charm". Heather Phares of AllMusic concluded, "Fresh and surprisingly accessible despite its quirks,Visions is bewitching". Eric Harvey of Spin wrote, "The pervasive sense on Visions is of a young woman carefully pushing out of her own introversion, which makes the moments where she sings from the gut instead of the throat [...] or strives for human-on-human sensuality [...] all the more thrilling". Harvey continued, "Boucher's talent lies in the balance of exploiting her gifts and leveraging what's come before her, but judiciously". Kevin Liedel of Slant Magazine viewed the album as "a flawed but intimate glimpse into the fantasies of its creator, and while it might not act as a springboard to greater fame for Grimes, it's just as satisfying to hear her take her bedroom music into a darkened basement, away from the prying world." However, Luke Winkie of Under the Radar felt that Visions "isn't as much of an evolution as it is an elongation; Boucher is still making warped, sparsely-populated electro-pop, and the potential still outweighs the content", adding that the album "stands as a half-formed concept". Reyan Ali of The Phoenix stated that "the ever-fascinating Boucher clearly has unusual ideas sloshing around her skull", but ultimately criticized the album as "unnecessarily oblique, listlessly long (48 minutes!), and painfully shapeless". Rolling Stone's Jody Rosen expressed that "Grimes isn't spooky enough to be 'ghostly,' and not substantial enough to hold your attention."

=== Accolades ===
AllMusic proclaimed Visions the best album of 2012 and stated, "On Visions, Claire Boucher honed the mix of little-girl-lost vocals and dark synth-scapes she'd forged on her first two Grimes albums, Geidi Primes and Halfaxa, into something just as unique, but far catchier." The Guardian named it the second best album of 2012, calling it "a masterpiece in gonzo pop that is weird, original and derivative at the same time". The NME ranked the album at number two on its 50 Best Albums of 2012 list and number 252 in its The 500 Greatest Albums Of All Time list. The album appeared at number five on Clash's list of The Top 40 Albums of 2012, and the magazine referred to Grimes as a "creative, sensual explosion of humanity". Pitchfork placed the album at number six on its list of The 50 Best Albums of 2012 and praised it as "a triumphant meeting of human and computer, an album that blows the traditions of both pop and experimental music to pieces and glues them back together in gorgeous, entrancing ways". PopMatters included the album at number 11 on its list of The 75 Best Albums of 2012, concluding, "Astoundingly catchy, occasionally haunting, and frequently brilliant, Visions is top-rate art and pop in equal measure, and deserves to be talked about for years to come".

British magazine Fact ranked Visions the 26th best album of 2012 and commented it "moved beyond the circumstantially lo-fi character of her early offerings Geidi Primes and Halfaxa for a profoundly inventive and just plain weird take on electro-pop. While the shifty rhythms can get a bit repetitive, they're usually voiced differently, and they're always paired with otherworldly synth-work that darts into uneasy, industrial territory". Rolling Stone placed Visions at number 33 on its 50 Best Albums of 2012 list, noting the album "uses EDM extremism, medieval chants, sugar-crusted melodies and her own sky-high voice to rethink pop music". The album was listed on Paste's The 50 Best Albums of 2012 at number 50, and the magazine wrote, "With its constantly shifting tonal landscapes and non-standard structures, it's the kind of music that's exceptionally hard to peg on paper, but that never stops Visions' tracks from looping in your head long after it spins to a close".

"Oblivion" was ranked the best song of 2012 by both Pitchfork and PopMatters; the former called it "beautifully fragmented" and stating it "sound[s] both chilly and machine-like but also radiate[s] human warmth and imperfection", while the later opined that "this nouveau dream pop triumph is surely the album's calling card, the definitive encapsulation of everything that makes the record (not to mention the musician behind it) so beguiling to listen to". Pitchfork also named "Oblivion" as the second best song of the decade. The NME named "Oblivion" and "Genesis" the sixth and 16th best tracks of 2012, respectively. Rolling Stone included "Oblivion" at number 28 on its list of the 50 Best Songs of 2012, writing that on the song, Grimes "drops sugar-dust vocals over a thwunking synth loop, sounding perfectly dreamy until you listen to the words: 'I never walk alone after dark.../Someone could break your neck/Coming up behind you and you'd never have a clue.' The catchiness only makes it creepier".

Visions was shortlisted for the 2012 Polaris Music Prize on July 17, 2012, but lost out to Feist's Metals. The album won Electronic Album of the Year at the Juno Awards of 2013. Visions is labeled as bringing the DIY music scene of the Mile End neighbourhood of Montreal to international popularity.

=== Year-end and decade-end lists ===
| Publication | Accolade | Rank | Ref. |
|---|---|---|---|
| AllMusic | AllMusic Best of 2012 | 1 | |
| Gorilla vs. Bear | Albums of the Decade | 1 | |
| The Guardian | Best Albums of 2012 | 2 | |
| NME | 50 Best Albums of 2012 | 2 | |
| Pitchfork | The 50 Best Albums of 2012 | 6 | |
| Pitchfork | Pitchfork's 200 Best Albums of the 2010s | 50 | |

== Track listing ==
All tracks are written by Claire Boucher.

Standard edition
| No. | Title | Length |
|---|---|---|
| 1. | "Infinite ♡ Without Fulfilment" | 1:36 |
| 2. | "Genesis" | 4:15 |
| 3. | "Oblivion" | 4:12 |
| 4. | "Eight" | 1:48 |
| 5. | "Circumambient" | 3:43 |
| 6. | "Vowels = Space and Time" | 4:21 |
| 7. | "Visiting Statue" | 1:59 |
| 8. | "Be a Body (侘寂)" | 4:20 |
| 9. | "Colour of Moonlight (Antiochus)" (featuring Doldrums) | 4:00 |
| 10. | "Symphonia IX (My Wait is U)" | 4:53 |
| 11. | "Nightmusic" (featuring Majical Cloudz) | 5:03 |
| 12. | "Skin" | 6:09 |
| 13. | "Know the Way (outro)" | 1:45 |
| Total length: | | 48:04 |

iTunes Store bonus track
| No. | Title | Length |
|---|---|---|
| 14. | "Christmas Song" (featuring Jay Worthy) | 2:58 |

Amazon MP3 bonus track
| No. | Title | Length |
|---|---|---|
| 14. | "Angel" | 1:22 |

Japanese edition bonus tracks
| No. | Title | Length |
|---|---|---|
| 14. | "Life After Death" | 2:48 |
| 15. | "Ambrosia" | 3:31 |

Canadian 12-inch vinyl
| No. | Title | Length |
|---|---|---|
| 1. | "Oblivion" | 4:12 |
| 2. | "Eight" | 1:48 |
| 3. | "Circumambient" | 3:43 |
| 4. | "Life After Death" | 2:48 |
| 5. | "Nightmusic" (featuring Majical Cloudz) | 5:03 |
| 6. | "Ambrosia" | 3:31 |
| 7. | "Symphonia IX (My Wait Is U)" | 4:51 |
| 8. | "Genesis" | 5:15 |
| 9. | "Skin" | 6:09 |
| Total length: | | 38:22 |

Rough Trade edition bonus disc
| No. | Title | Length |
|---|---|---|
| 1. | "Ambrosia" | 3:33 |
| 2. | "Christmas Song" (featuring Jay Worthy) | 3:00 |
| 3. | "Genesis" (Skip Remix) | 4:01 |
| 4. | "Song for Ric" (featuring Majical Cloudz) | 3:25 |
| 5. | "Be a Body" (Baardsen Rework) | 3:25 |

Resident edition bonus disc
| No. | Title | Length |
|---|---|---|
| 1. | "Angel" | 1:22 |
| 2. | "Life After Death" | 2:48 |
| 3. | "Oblivion" (Baardsen Remix) | 3:25 |
| 4. | "Be a Body" (Tokori Remix) | 4:55 |

== Personnel ==
Credits adapted from the liner notes of Visions.

- Grimes – vocals, production, poetry
- Anna Akhmatova – poetry
- Jasper Baydala – layout
- Sebastian Cowan – mastering, mixing
- Mark Khair – alien head design

== Charts ==
=== Weekly charts ===
| Chart (2012–13) | Peak position |
|---|---|
| Australian Hitseekers Albums (ARIA) | 7 |
| Belgian Albums (Ultratop Flanders) | 46 |
| Belgian Heatseekers Albums (Ultratop Wallonia) | 9 |
| Irish Albums (IRMA) | 65 |
| UK Albums (Official Charts) | 67 |
| UK Independent Albums (Official Charts) | 8 |
| US Billboard 200 | 98 |
| US Independent Albums (Billboard) | 13 |
| US Top Alternative Albums (Billboard) | 17 |
| US Top Dance Albums (Billboard) | 8 |

=== Year-end charts ===
| Chart (2012) | Position |
|---|---|
| US Top Dance/Electronic Albums (Billboard) | 21 |

== Certifications ==
| Region | Certification | Certified units/sales |
|---|---|---|
| Canada (Music Canada) | Gold | 40,000^{‡} |
| New Zealand (RMNZ) | Gold | 7,500^{‡} |
| United Kingdom (BPI) | Silver | 60,000^{‡} |
^{‡} Sales+streaming figures based on certification alone.

== Release history ==
| Region | Date | Label | Ref. |
|---|---|---|---|
| Canada | February 21, 2012 | Arbutus | |
| United States | February 21, 2012 | 4AD | |
| Australia | March 1, 2012 | Remote Control | |
| Germany | March 9, 2012 | 4AD | |
| Ireland | March 9, 2012 | 4AD | |
| United Kingdom | March 12, 2012 | 4AD | |
| France | March 13, 2012 | 4AD | |
| Japan | June 6, 2012 | Hostess | |
