= Realiti (song) =

Song by Grimes

from the album Art Angels
- Released: March 8, 2015
- Recorded: Early 2013
- Genre: EDM; bubblegum pop (only in Art Angels)
- Length: 4:24 (demo); 5:06 (album version)
- Songwriter: Grimes
- Producer: Grimes

Demo cover

Music video
- "Realiti" on YouTube

"Realiti" (stylized as "REALiTi") is a song by Canadian singer Grimes. It was released as a YouTube video on March 8, 2015, as a thank you to her fans in Asia. The song was later included on her 2015 album Art Angels. The demo version was included as a bonus track on the CD release of the album.

== Composition ==
Grimes originally intended the song to be released on her abandoned fourth studio album. She claims it to only be a demo that was recorded in early 2013, and that she has lost the original Ableton file, so it was never mixed and mastered. The version from the video was taken from an MP3 file that she tried to doctor into what she considered to be "a listenable state". Musically, the song is described as EDM and trance.

== Music video ==
The video for the demo version of the song was shot by Mac Boucher during shows of her tour in Asia.

== Critical reception ==
Despite being initially only a demo, "Realiti" received critical acclaim. MTV says that after listening to the song, "you'll be wondering why Grimes left the track off her album." Stereogum agreed, saying that "REALiTi" was "a very good new song" and that "if she's willing to toss great songs like these into the ether, then when is she coming with something official?" The Atlantic notes that the song "is as good as anything on the radio" and goes on to claim that "the song is fabulous" and adds that the recording-quality issues don't prevent the song from sounding better than anything on the radio. Pitchfork Media claims the song is the best new Grimes release since Visions and calls it a "compelling step forth," which "absorbs EDM and trance in Boucher's seemingly infinite palette of sound."

The reaction to the song online was so positive that Grimes said she would consider adding it to her new album, although she believes she has "better". The announcement of the track listing to Art Angels revealed that she ultimately complied and added the song to the album.

Consequence of Sound named "Realiti" the fifth best song of 2015.

== Charts ==
Chart (2015)	Peak position
US Hot Dance/Electronic Songs (Billboard)	30
