= Grimes =

Canadian musician (born 1988)

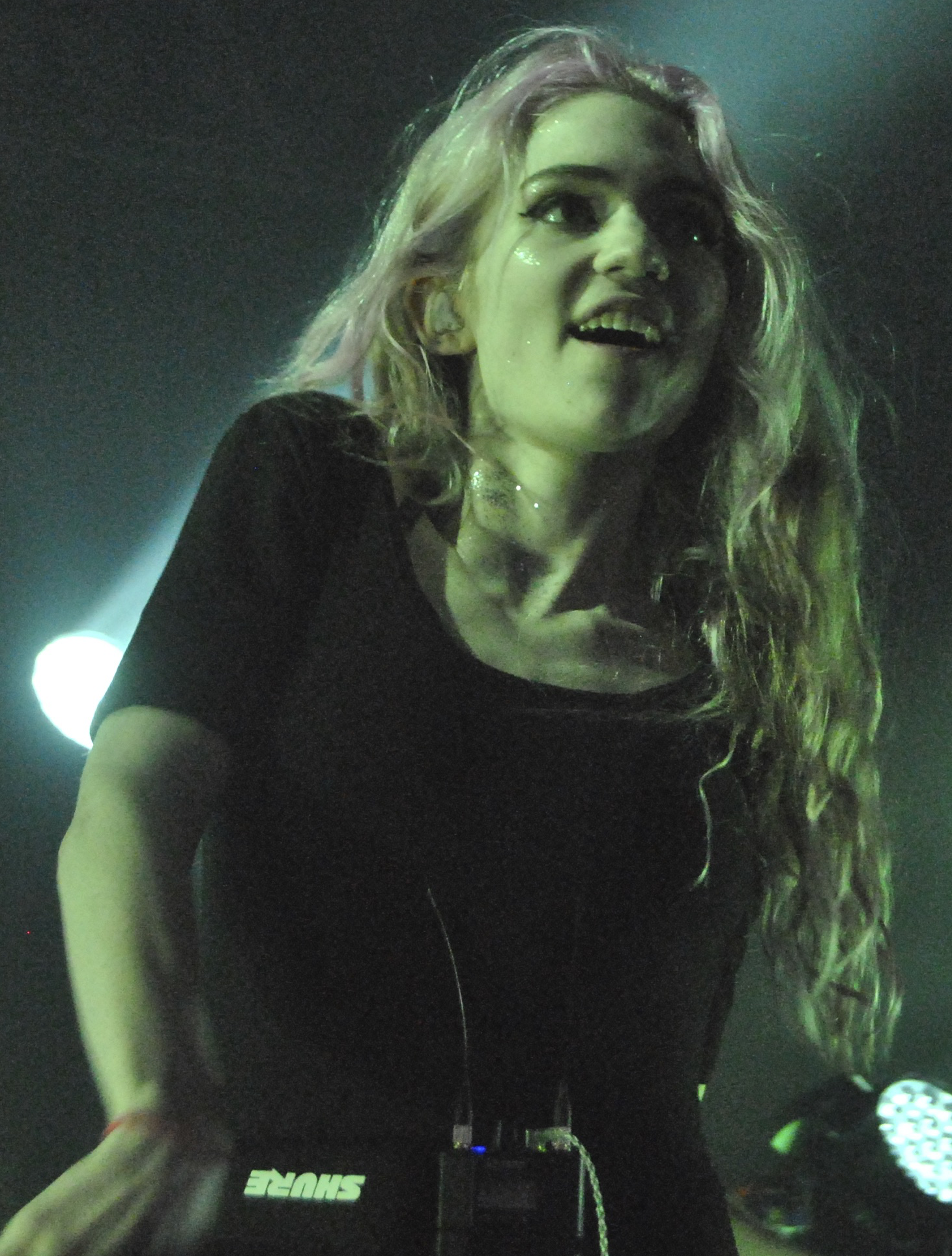
- Grimes in 2014
- Born: Claire Elise Boucher; March 17, 1988 (age 38); Vancouver, British Columbia, Canada
- Other name: c
- Education: McGill University (unfinished)
- Occupations: Musician; singer; songwriter; record producer; music video director; visual artist
- Years active: 2007–present
- Partner: Elon Musk (2018–2021)
- Children: 3
- Relatives: Jay Worthy (stepbrother)
- Awards: Full list
- Musical career
- Origin: Montreal, Quebec, Canada
- Genres: Synth-pop; electropop; art pop; dream pop; dance-pop
- Instruments: Vocals; keyboards; synthesizers; guitar; violin
- Works: Discography
- Labels: Arbutus; 4AD; Roc Nation; Nazgul; Columbia
- Formerly of: Membrain

Claire Elise Boucher (/buːˈʃeɪ/ boo-SHAY, Canadian French: [buʃe]; born March 17, 1988), known professionally as Grimes, is a Canadian singer, songwriter, and record producer. She is known for her ethereal synthpop sound and incorporating high fantasy and science fiction themes.

Born and raised in Vancouver, British Columbia, Grimes began releasing music independently after moving to Montreal, Quebec, in 2006. She released two albums, Geidi Primes and Halfaxa, in 2010 on Arbutus Records, before signing with 4AD and rising to prominence with the release of her 2012 album, Visions. The album received the Canadian music industry Juno Award for Electronic Album of the Year, and yielded two singles: "Genesis" and "Oblivion". Following this, her fourth studio album, Art Angels, was released in 2015, and several publications named it the best album of the year. Her fifth studio album, Miss Anthropocene, was released in 2020. Her sixth studio album, Psy Opera, is scheduled for release in 2027.

Outside of music, Grimes had a voice role in the 2020 action role-playing video game Cyberpunk 2077 and was a judge on the music competition game show Alter Ego.

== Early life ==
Grimes was born Claire Elise Boucher in Vancouver, British Columbia, on March 17, 1988, the first child of Sandy Garossino, a former Crown prosecutor and arts advocate, and Maurice Boucher, a former banker who works "in the business side of biotech." She is of French Canadian (Québécois) and Italian descent. Her grandmother was born in Alberta and her great-grandmother immigrated from Ukraine to Canada in her youth.

Grimes and her younger brother, Mac, were raised Roman Catholic, and attended Catholic school in Vancouver. She later commented that her religious upbringing had a significant impact on her: "It totally influences everything I do. I think I have serious latent Catholic guilt issues." Her parents divorced when she was 11 years old, after which her mother remarried. Her step-father is an Indo-Canadian man named Ravi Sidhoo, and she considers Indian culture a significant influence in her upbringing. Through her mother's remarriage, she has two stepbrothers, one of whom is a member of the hip-hop duo LNDN DRGS and performs under the name Jay Worthy.

In 2006, Grimes graduated from Lord Byng Secondary School and relocated from Vancouver to Montreal to attend McGill University's joint Bachelor of Arts and Science program. "I was studying general Arts and Science degree, but I was in the electro-acoustics program" she said in early interviews. However, she later said she studied neuroscience. She was expelled in December 2010 for skipping classes.

== Career ==
=== 2007–2011: Career beginnings, Geidi Primes, and Halfaxa ===
Grimes began releasing music on Myspace under her current stage name in 2007. Her performer name was chosen because at the time, MySpace allowed artists to list three musical genres. She listed "grime" for all three, without knowing what the grime music genre was. Grimes was self-taught in music and visual art.

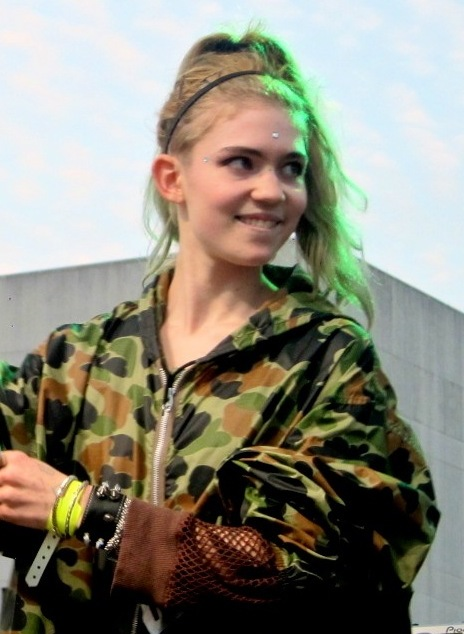
Grimes performing at South by Southwest 2012

In January 2010, Grimes released her debut album, Geidi Primes, a concept album inspired by the Dune series, followed by her second album, Halfaxa, in October of the same year. After the release of Halfaxa, she began to publicly promote her music and tour beyond Montreal. In 2011 Grimes released five songs on her side of the split 12" with d'Eon, Darkbloom (through both Arbutus and Hippos in Tanks). Beginning in May 2011, Grimes opened for Lykke Li on her North American tour, and the following August her debut album was re-released through No Pain in Pop Records, in CD and vinyl format for the first time. In 2011, she collaborated with DJ/producer Blood Diamonds.

=== 2011–2014: Visions ===
Following extensive touring and positive reception to her first two albums and Darkbloom contribution, Grimes signed with record label 4AD in January 2012. Her third studio album, Visions, was released on February 21, 2012, in Canada through Arbutus Records, in the United States through 4AD, and various dates in March 2012 elsewhere. appeared on a number of publications' year-end lists and was considered Grimes' breakout album. NME included it on their 500 Greatest Albums of All Time list in 2013. Visions won the Electronic Album of the Year Award and Grimes was nominated for the Breakthrough Artist of the Year at the 2013 Junos. Grimes also won the Artist of the Year Award at the 2013 Webbys.

[After nine days] you have no stimulation, so your subconscious starts filling in the blanks ... I started to feel like I was channelling spirits. I was convinced my music was a gift from God. It was like I knew exactly what to do next, as if my songs were already written.

— Grimes in The Guardian, April 27, 2012

The album's second single, "Oblivion", was named the best song of 2012 by Pitchfork and was produced into a music video co-directed by Emily Kai Bock and Grimes. Pitchfork ranked "Oblivion" at number one on their 200 Best Tracks of the Decade So Far list in 2014. In interviews following the album's release, Grimes explained that she was assigned a strict deadline by which to have her third album finished far before it was complete, resulting in her recording the bulk of Visions while isolated in her Montreal apartment in Mile End for three consecutive weeks. Notably, this intensive recording session included a period of nine days without sleep or food and with blacked out windows, since she generally could not make music as readily during the day, and doing "tons of amphetamines" She described the writing process as being "equally enjoyable and tortuous", feeling that its difficulty contributed to its success. Grimes went on the Visions Tour from 2012 to 2014 with supporting acts Born Gold, Myths, Elite Gymnastics, and Ami Dang. From March 23–25, 2012, Grimes staged an art show and charity auction at the Audio Visual Arts (AVA) gallery in New York City, featuring paintings and drawings. In March 2012, Grimes collaborated with Cop Car Bonfire's Tim Lafontaine and went under the name, Membrain. They planned to release an EP called, Sit Back, Rewind. In May 2012, Grimes was featured on Blood Diamonds's song "Phone Sex". In July 2012, Grimes toured as a supporting act with Diplo and Skrillex on the Full Flex Express Canadian Train Tour. In August 2012, Grimes made her American television debut on Late Night With Jimmy Fallon.

In April 2013, Grimes posted a written statement addressing her experience as a female musician as rife with sexism and expressed disappointment that her feminist stance was often interpreted as anti-male. When speaking about her preference to produce all her studio albums herself, she said, "I don't wanna be just like the face of this thing I built, I want to be the one who built it." In December 2013, Grimes employed the services of Jay-Z's management company, Roc Nation.

=== 2014–2017: Art Angels ===
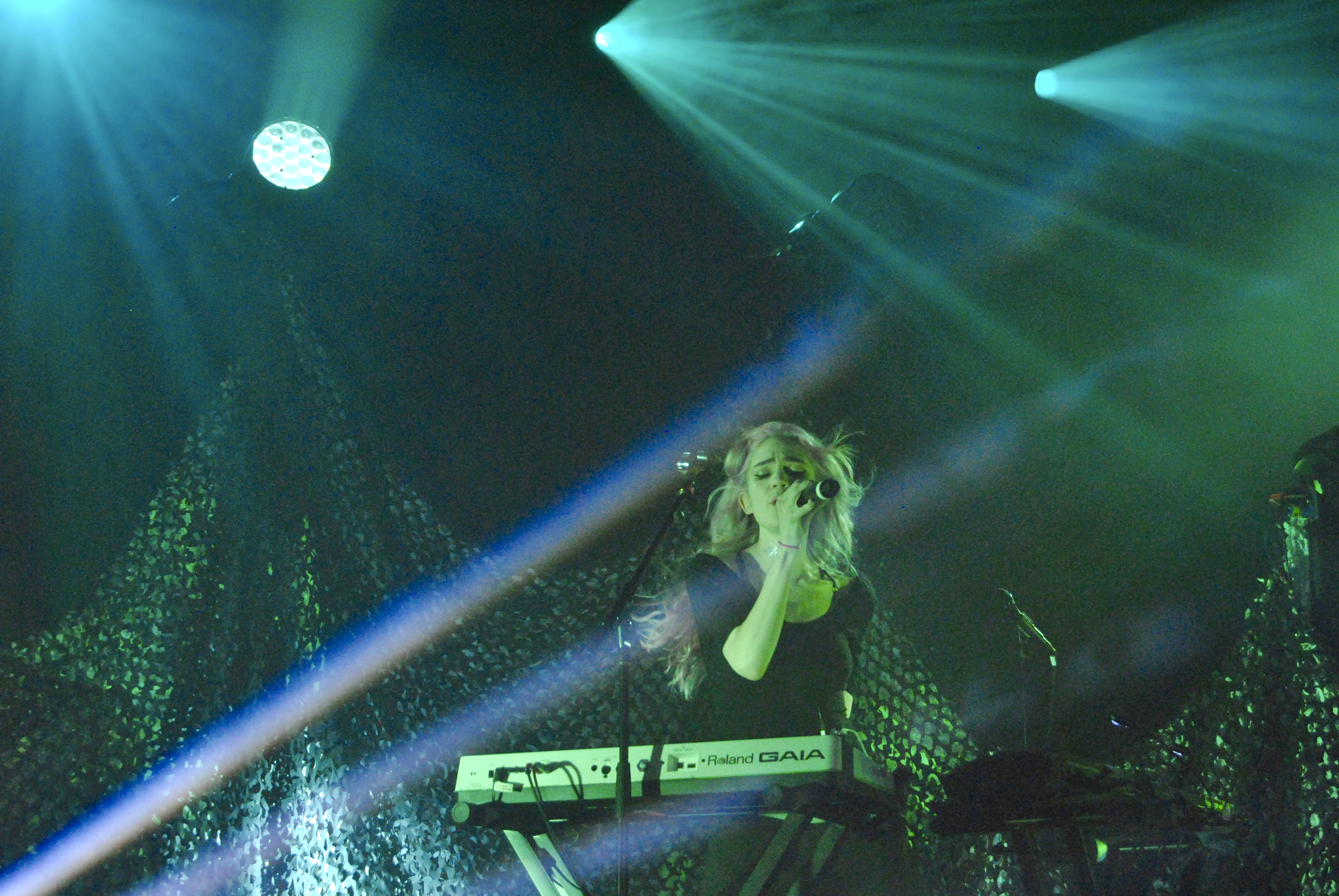
Grimes performing at the Governors Ball in June 2014

On June 26, 2014, Grimes premiered the new track "Go", produced by and featuring Blood Diamonds. It was a track that had been written for and rejected by Rihanna and was premiered on Zane Lowe's radio 1 show. Rolling Stone ranked it number fourteen on their Best Songs of 2014 list. In July 2014, Grimes was featured on Bleachers' song "Take Me Away" from their album, Strange Desire. On August 19, 2014, Grimes was featured in the music for the remix of Haim's My Song 5.

On March 8, 2015, Grimes released a self-directed video for a demo version of "Realiti" from an abandoned album. It received critical acclaim from music critics, being named Best New Music by Jenn Pelly from Pitchfork, calling it the "best new Grimes song since Visions." On March 15, 2015, Grimes and Bleachers released their collaboration, "Entropy" for the HBO TV show Girls. In the summer of 2015, Grimes toured with Lana Del Rey for several of her Endless Summer Tour dates. She then toured in the fall of 2015 as the headliner of her own Rhinestone Cowgirls Tour with opener Nicole Dollanganger.

Speaking of her upcoming fourth album, scheduled for a "surprise" release in October 2015, Grimes said that record was recorded with "real instruments", a departure from the primarily synth and sampler driven composing of her prior releases. On October 26, 2015, Grimes released the lead single of the album, "Flesh Without Blood", as well as a two-act music video comprising both "Flesh Without Blood" and "Life in the Vivid Dream", another song from the upcoming album. The album, titled Art Angels, was released in November 2015 to favourable reviews, garnering an 88 (out of 100) rating on Metacritic and the Best New Music designation from Pitchfork. Jessica Hopper of Pitchfork described Art Angels as "evidence of Boucher's labor and an articulation of a pop vision that is incontrovertibly hers... an epic holiday buffet of tendentious feminist fuck-off, with second helpings for anonymous commenters and music industry blood-suckers."

Art Angels was named the best album of 2015 by NME, Exclaim!, and Stereogum. It peaked at number 1 on the Billboard US Top Alternative Album Chart and number 2 on the Billboard Top Independent Album chart. Grimes won the 2016 International award at the Socan Annual Awards and the 2016 Harper's Bazaar Musician of the Year Award in October.

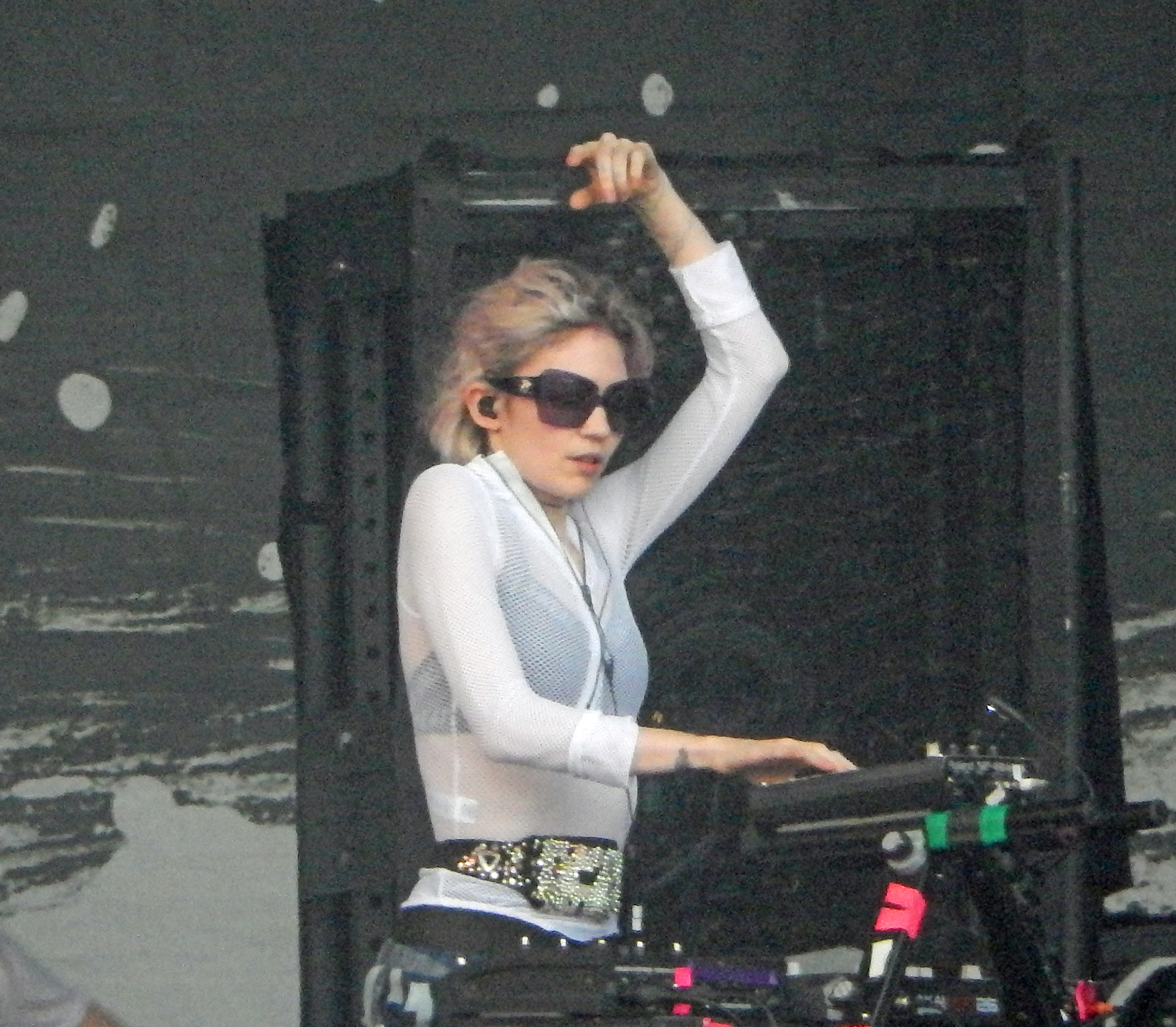
Grimes performing at Lollapalooza 2016

In the spring of 2016, Grimes toured Asia and Europe with supporting act Hana on the Ac!d Reign Tour. Grimes continued touring through the summer of 2016, performing at various music festivals across North America and opening for Florence and the Machine on select dates of the How Beautiful Tour.

Continuing the series of music videos for songs off Art Angels that began with "Flesh Without Blood" and "Life in the Vivid Dream" ("Act I" and "Act II", respectively), Grimes released the music video for "Kill V. Maim" ("Act III") on January 19, 2016, and the music video for "California" ("Act IV") on May 9, 2016. Grimes crafted a slightly remixed version of "California" for the music video to achieve a less "dissonant" visual/auditory mix. On August 3, 2016, Grimes released the song "Medieval Warfare" as part of the soundtrack of the 2016 superhero film, Suicide Squad.

On October 5, 2016, Grimes with friend and collaborator Hana Pestle, more commonly known by stage name Hana, released "The Ac!d Reign Chronicles", a lo-fi series of seven music videos including songs by Grimes ("Butterfly", "World Princess Part II", "Belly of the Beat" and "Scream") and Hana ("Underwater", "Chimera" and "Avalanche"), each starring in their respective segments. Additional appearances include Aristophanes in Scream and two of Grimes' backup dancers, Linda Davis and Alyson Van, throughout the series. "The AC!D Reign Chronicles" were recorded over the course of two weeks during the duo's time touring Europe and were made with minimal production, shot exclusively on iPhones with no crew aside from her brother, Mac Boucher, who assisted with filming. In 2016, Grimes co-wrote the song "Heaven" for Troye Sivan's album Blue Neighbourhood.

On February 2, 2017, Grimes premiered on Tidal the high budget futuristic music video of "Venus Fly", starring herself and Janelle Monáe. The video was uploaded on YouTube on February 9, 2017. She won Best Dance Video for "Venus Fly" at the 2017 Much Music Video Awards. In 2017, Grimes won a JUNO Award for Video of the Year, featuring "Kill V. Maim". On October 19, 2017, Grimes released a cover of Tegan and Sara's "Dark Come Soon" with Hana. The cover is a part of Tegan and Sara's The Con X: Covers album.

=== 2018–2021: Miss Anthropocene and collaborations ===
In February 2018, Grimes wrote on Instagram, "welp no music any time soon after all." It was later revealed that this was due to a clash with her label, 4AD. She later revealed on an Instagram post that she would eventually be releasing two albums, and that "they would be separated by a period of time", with the first being released with 4AD, and the second with an undisclosed label. Grimes stated that this first album would be "highly collaborative and [characterized by] most glorious light", with the second highlighting themes of "pure darkness and chaos."

On April 10, 2018, Grimes was featured on "Pynk", the third single from Janelle Monáe's album, Dirty Computer. On May 30, 2018, Grimes was featured on "Love4Eva" by Loona yyxy, the lead single from South Korean girl group Loona's third sub-unit's debut EP Beauty & the Beat. On June 15, 2018, she was featured in a video for Apple's Behind the Mac series on their YouTube channel, with a preview of a song from her upcoming album titled "That's What the Drugs Are For", later released as "My Name Is Dark". In the same month, she posted two Twitter videos previewing two songs from her upcoming album, "adore u (beautiful game)" and "4ÆM". In 2018, Grimes composed the theme music for Netflix's animated series Hilda. On October 19, 2018, Grimes was featured on Jimmy Urine's "The Medicine Does Not Control Me" from the album, Euringer.

On October 31, 2018, Grimes was featured on "Play Destroy" by Poppy on her album Am I a Girl? Shortly after the release of "Play Destroy", Poppy accused Grimes of bullying during the making of "Play Destroy" stating:

"I was kind of bullied into submission by [Grimes] and her team of self-proclaimed feminists", she says. "We planned the song coming out months ago, and she was preventing it. I got to watch her bully songwriters into signing NDA and not taking credit for songs that they were a part of. She doesn't practice what she preaches."

Grimes responded by saying:

"Poppy, you dragged me into a disgusting situation and won't stop punishing me for not wanting to be a part of it", [..] "I don't want to work with you, you leaked the song anyway. u got what you want. Let it go."

On November 29, 2018, Grimes released the single, "We Appreciate Power" featuring Hana, which was described as an industrial rock and nu metal song. On December 10, 2018, Grimes performed the song on The Tonight Show Starring Jimmy Fallon. Grimes also appeared on Bring Me the Horizon's "Nihilist Blues" from their sixth album, Amo, in January 2019.

On August 13, 2019, Grimes posted an advertisement for the Adidas by Stella McCartney Fall 2019 collection on Instagram, stating that she would release the first single off her upcoming album, Miss Anthropocene, on September 13, 2019. She released the music video for "Violence", featuring i_o, on September 5, 2019. On October 25, 2019, an unfinished version of the album was leaked online. On November 15, 2019, she released two versions of the single "So Heavy I Fell Through the Earth" On November 29, 2019, Grimes released the single "My Name Is Dark". On December 13, 2019, Grimes released the single "4ÆM" and performed the song at the 2019 Video Game Awards in order to introduce herself as Lizzy Wizzy, a voiced character in the game Cyberpunk 2077. On February 12, 2020, she released the single "Delete Forever", which was partly inspired by the death of Lil Peep and the ongoing opioid crisis. Miss Anthropocene was released on February 21, 2020. On February 27, 2020, Grimes released a music video for the song "Idoru". On April 1, 2020, Grimes released a music video for the song "You'll Miss Me When I'm Not Around" and asked fans to finish the video because it only features Grimes and a green screen. On June 17, 2020, Grimes was featured on Ashnikko's song, "Cry" from her mixtape, Demidevil.

Grimes made an appearance on the Adult Swim sketch comedy show, The Eric Andre Show in November 2020. Grimes collaborated with Benee on the dance-style song "Sheesh" on the latter's debut album, Hey U X, released on November 11, 2020. On December 11, 2020, Grimes and other associated artists, all using aliases, released a Cyberpunk 2077-themed DJ mix album on Apple Music, titled This story is dedicated to all those cyberpunks who fight against injustice and corruption every day of their lives!. It contains two new songs by Grimes, "Samana" and "Delicate Weapon". On December 18, 2020, nine months after the release of her fifth studio album, Miss Anthropocene, Grimes changed the cover art for the album on all streaming platforms. The new cover art is a painting by Rupid Leejm that Grimes commissioned to use. In discussing the process of choosing the cover art originally, "I polled a bunch of ppl and everyone said not to use it (??) but I wish I trusted my gut. I fucking LOVE this painting." On January 1, 2021, Grimes released Miss Anthropocene: Rave Edition, a remix album featuring new versions of songs on the album by artists including BloodPop, Channel Tres, Richie Hawtin, and Modeselektor, along with two remixes from her Cyberpunk 2077 Apple Music DJ mix.

=== 2021–present: Alter Ego, collaborations, and Psy Opera ===
On March 5, 2021, Grimes signed with Columbia Records. On May 8, 2021, Grimes appeared on a Saturday Night Live sketch as Princess Peach alongside the host, Elon Musk, as Wario. In June 2021, she appeared in Doja Cat's music video "Need to Know". Later that month, Grimes started a new partnered Discord server called "Grimes Metaverse Super Beta" and a new podcast "Homo Techno", co-hosted with science communicator Liv Boeree. She used the Discord server to tease new music frequently, and released a snippet of a song called "Shinigami Eyes" which she continued to promote in subsequent social media posts, Grimes spoke about an upcoming concept album with Billboard in July 2021, describing it as a "space opera."

In July 2021, Grimes, alongside will.i.am, Alanis Morissette, Nick Lachey, and Rocsi Diaz were revealed as judges on Alter Ego, a new singing competition series in which the contestants make the use of motion capture technology to portray themselves as "dream avatars." She also made a cameo appearance in the short film Discord: The Movie, alongside Awkwafina, Danny DeVito, and J Balvin. On September 30, 2021, Grimes released a new song titled "Love" recorded in response to her separation from Elon Musk and its subsequent media attention.

In November 2021, Grimes released a collaboration between her "AI girl group" named NPC and music producer Chris Lake, titled "A Drug from God". On December 3, 2021, Grimes announced the title of her sixth studio album, Book 1, and released a new single titled "Player of Games". In December 2021, Grimes teased a collaboration with the Weeknd on Discord, saying it would be released in 2022.

In January 2022, Grimes partnered with the video game Rocket League for the Neon Nights event. The event ran from January 26 to February 8, and featured Grimes-themed items and her songs "Shinigami Eyes" and "Player of Games". In January 2022, Grimes announced a 10th anniversary vinyl of her album Visions. On January 26, 2022, she released "Shinigami Eyes". A week later, on February 3, 2022, Grimes announced her forthcoming EP titled Fairies Cum First. In April 2022, Grimes was featured on the song, "Last Day" by the Russian band IC3PEAK from the album Kiss of Death. Grimes was featured in the music video for Bella Poarch's "Dolls" which was released on July 15, 2022. Grimes was an opening act on select dates for Swedish House Mafia's Paradise Again Tour alongside Kaytranada, ZHU, and Alesso. The tour ran from July 29 to November 13, 2022. Grimes appeared on Bella Poarch's song, "No Man's Land" from the Dolls EP, which was released on August 12, 2022.

In August 2022, Grimes was featured on the cover of Vogue Plus China, in which she did an interview and further discussed her upcoming collaboration with The Weeknd. She confirmed that the song is called "Sci Fi" and is set for release in mid-2022. She also provided more details about her upcoming studio album and EP, stating, "all these projects [will] come together and merge into one project at the end." On September 17, 2022, she revealed that she has twenty songs for her upcoming album and teased that the album might be divided into two albums. She also confirmed that the album was in the process of being mixed. In January 2023, Grimes gave an update on her delayed sixth album, Book 1, announcing that her career was a 'side quest' now and that her children, friends and family were her priorities. On January 31, 2023, it was announced that Grimes would feature on Caroline Polachek's song "Fly to You", alongside Dido. The song is from Polachek's fourth studio album, Desire, I Want to Turn Into You, which released on February 14, 2023.

In April 2023, Grimes invited people to use her voice in AI generated songs, stating that she likes the idea of 'killing copyright'. On June 8, 2023, Grimes released "Welcome to the Opera", along with Anyma, also known as Matteo Milleri, of the Italian duo Tale of Us. On July 28, 2023, Grimes released "I Wanna Be Software", with Canadian record producer Illangelo. On November 3, 2023, Grimes collaborated with Iranian-Dutch singer Sevdaliza on the song "Nothing Lasts Forever". In December 2023, it was announced that Grimes would be partnering with the toy Curio company to launch an interactive AI toy named "Grok" that she provided the voice for.

In April 2024, Grimes DJed at Coachella, which was cut short due to technical problems. Grimes restarted songs several times, punctuated by loud yelps and screeches of frustration, telling the crowd she was experiencing speed issues with her tracks which were playing double their normal tempo and she was having trouble "doing the math." Grimes remarked the problems came from her having outsourced preparation work to third parties due to time constraints. On September 20, 2024, Grimes released a remix of a song called "Supernova", originally by K-pop group Aespa as part of "iScreaM Vol.33 : Supernova / Armageddon Remixes", the 33rd EP in a series of K-pop remixes by SM Entertainment sub-label "ScreaM Records". On October 29, 2024, Grimes released a remix of Magdalena Bay's "Image". Magdalena Bay had previously credited Grimes as an inspiration for their work.

On February 24, 2025, two demos were uploaded to Grimes' SoundCloud: "The Fool" and "I Don't Give a Fuck, I'm Insane". The latter appeared on other streaming sites a few hours later. Grimes co-produced Adéla's song "Machine Girl", which was released on February 28, 2025. Grimes also made a cameo in the song's music video alongside Sofia Wylie. On October 17, 2025, Grimes released the single "Artificial Angels". A music video for the song was released on October 20, 2025. On October 31, 2025 Grimes was featured on the single "Entwined", by English DJ/producer Sub Focus. In April 2026, Grimes began teasing her upcoming sixth studio album, Psy Opera. In an interview with Interview Magazine, Grimes discussed why she temporarily quit music, "Everything I’d been going through with the public and my personal life and having kids, I was like, ‘I’m just going to be a stay-at-home mom. Screw this." The release date for the album was not given as Grimes said that the album was "not quite done." On June 26, 2026, Grimes released a collaboration with Swedish singer/songwriter Cobrah titled "Sign From God". On August 14, 2026, Grimes was featured on the single, "Miku-Maxxing", along with producer SatapanP and vocaloid Hatsune Miku. The song is the lead single for the collaborative Hatsune Miku EP, Beyond Borders Vol.1: Emerge Mode Miku. On October 7, Grimes began posting teasers for Psy Opera. A release date was not announced but the album will be her first released on her own label, Nazgul Recording LLC. On October 9, Grimes released the single, "Accelerando".

== Artistry ==
=== Musical style ===
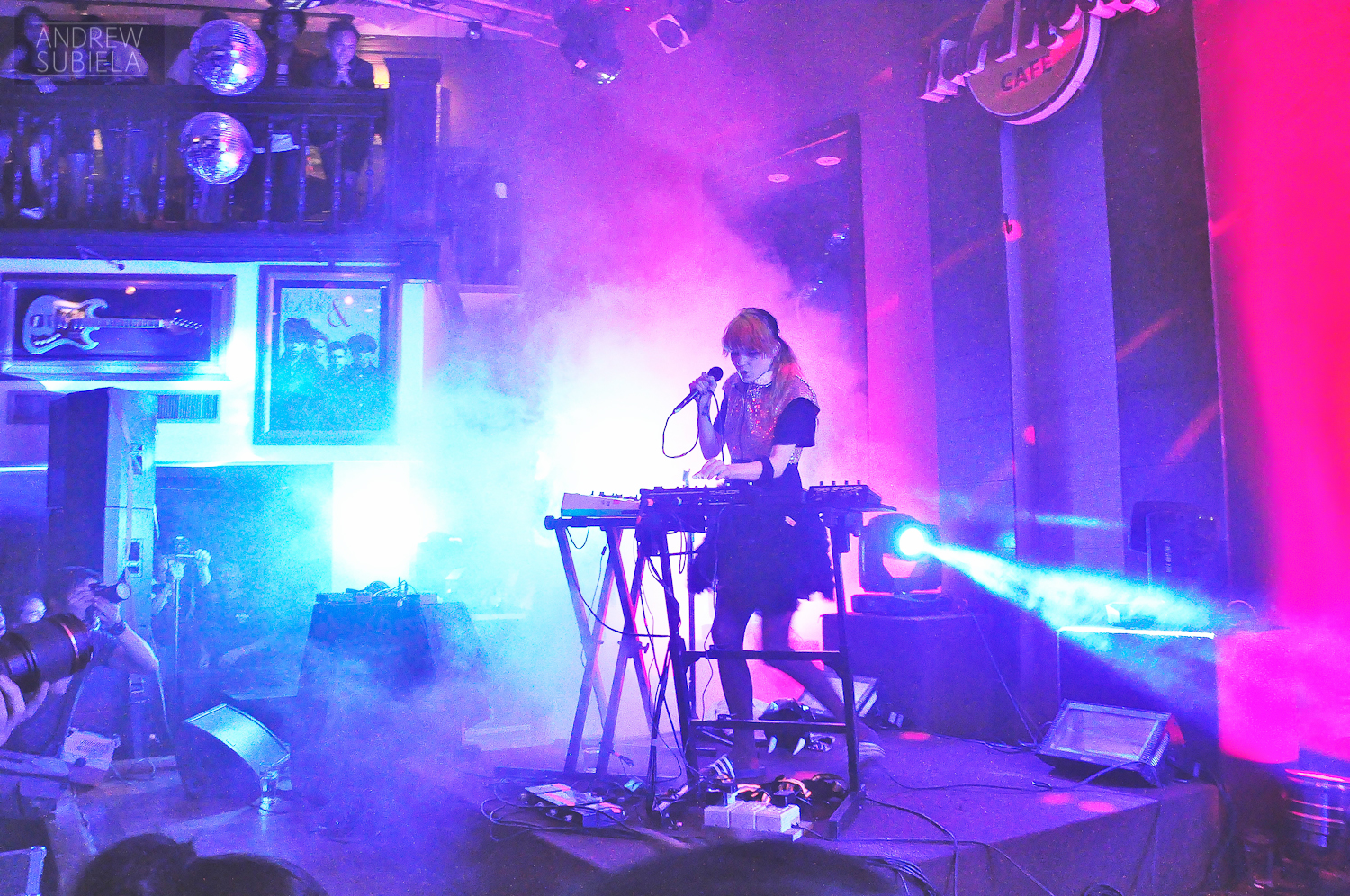
Grimes at Hard Rock Café Makati in 2013

Grimes' music has been described with a number of labels, including synth-pop, electropop, art pop, indie pop, dream pop, experimental pop, dance-pop, pop, avant-garde pop, lo-fi, dance, witch house, electronic, glo-fi, bedroom pop, and electronica with elements of rock, hip-hop, R&B, folk, drum and bass, and classical. (Note: Musical styles: "synth-pop"; "electropop"; "art pop"; "indie pop"; "dream pop"; "experimental pop"; "dance-pop"; "pop"; "avant-garde pop"; "lo-fi"; "dance"; "witch house"; "electronic"; "glo-fi"; "bedroom pop"; "electronica"; "with elements of:"; "rock"; "hip hop"; "R&B"; "folk"; "drum and bass"; "classical")

According to Vulture, "[Grimes moved away] from the creepy, lo-fi R&B of her early releases to the futuristic dance-pop of her...[third] album, Visions." For her fourth studio, Art Angels, Grimes learned how to play guitar and violin. She stated "I didn't want to play the keys, 'cause I don't want to be considered synth-pop." Rolling Stone described the album as a move away from her "hazy synth-pop toward an off-kilter guitars-and-beats sound", and "uses rock sounds in a really different context." Grimes described her fifth studio album Miss Anthropocene as "mostly ethereal nu metal." The Guardian summarised her musical style: "By sounding a little like everything you've ever heard, the whole sounds like nothing you've ever heard." The Japan Times wrote that Grimes' "otherworldly, Ableton-assisted music is crammed full of hooks fit to sit alongside Rihanna and Taylor Swift in the Top 40." Dazed stated: "In a sense, she'd always thrived on being too pop for indie and too indie for pop." Her lyrics were described by The Guardian as "generally elusive and impressionistic, shying away from specifics." Grimes is a soprano. The Daily Telegraph described her vocals as "sweet, thin and hazy." She utilizes looping and layering techniques, particularly with vocals; many of her songs feature layers of over fifty different vocal tracks which create an "ethereal" sound. Her lyrical themes include science fiction, feminism, and climate change. Her fifth studio album Miss Anthropocene has been considered to be a loose concept album about an "anthropomorphic goddess of climate change" inspired by Roman mythology and villainy. Heather Phares of AllMusic described the album as a "brooding embodiment of climate change." In the single "So Heavy I Fell Through the Earth" she also experimented with AI-generated music using the NSynth neural synthesizer.

Grimes described her music as "ADD music", shifting frequently and dramatically – "I go through phases a lot." She said "Most music with traditional verse, chorus and bridge structures can probably be considered 'pop'. But I think most people think about Top 40 these days when they use the word 'pop', and I'm emphatically not from that world."

=== Influences ===
Grimes has said that Panda Bear's 2007 album Person Pitch "jumpstarted" her mind. She explains, "Up until that point I had basically only made weird atonal drone music, with no sense of songwriting. I barely understood anything about music ... But suddenly all music clicked into place and seemed so simple and easy. I was pretty much able to spontaneously write songs immediately after listening to this album once."

While making Visions, Grimes was listening to Aphex Twin, Black Dice, Dungeon Family, Michael Jackson, New Edition, Outkast, Nine Inch Nails, Burial, TLC, Mariah Carey and stated "I'm into the really caustic beats, the kind of sharp drum and bass kind of stuff. Really nice vocals too, with lots of tight harmonies at the same time."

Grimes cites Blink-182 as an influence in her Amoeba Records "What's In My Bag?" episode where she picked one of their live DVDs. Grimes considers Blue Hawaii "a big part of [her] family in Montreal." Grimes stated that Cocteau Twins are "one of the first bands I was into that was considered alternative." In 2014, In a tweet, Grimes replied to someone saying that her recent influences were Chris Isaak, St. Vincent, and Mindless Self Indulgence. The theories of her second studio album, Halfaxa were inspired by Hildegard of Bingen.

Before releasing her fourth studio album, Art Angels, Grimes described one of her upcoming songs as a glam rock track inspired by David Bowie and Queen. Art Angels was also influenced by Billy Joel, Bruce Springsteen, and The Godfather movies. Grimes said that while touring with How to Dress Well, his song "Suicide Dream 2" "made me tear up every night... [and] after this tour I got really re-inspired, went home, and immediately wrote [songs that] are, in my opinion, the best shit I've ever done." Early on, Grimes stated that "an early diet of the Spice Girls, Marilyn Manson, OutKast and Skinny Puppy drove her to build pop songs out of the harsher sonic textures she rarely heard on the radio." Some of her other influences include Jedi Mind Tricks, Kenji Kawai, Yoko Kanno, Alicia Keys, Christina Aguilera, Panda Bear, Bikini Kill, Kate Bush, Al Green, Salem, Trent Reznor, Tool, Yeah Yeah Yeahs, Beyoncé, and Paramore.

=== Visual art ===
Grimes designs her album art for all of her albums, gig fliers, comic book covers, and merchandise. She has done exhibitions showcasing her works and has stated that "[she has] always been a visual artist." Her art is influenced by Japanese anime, manga, and comic artists such as Charles Burns and Daniel Clowes. Her illustrations have appeared in gallery shows, including at Guggenheim Museum Bilbao. She created an alternate cover for Image Comics' The Wicked + The Divine, and designed a capsule collection of t-shirts for Hedi Slimane's Saint Laurent, in 2013. That year, she also curated a two-day event at the Audio Visual Arts Gallery in New York City with a silent auction to benefit the Native Women's Association of Canada's campaign to raise awareness of violence against aboriginal women in Canada. In early 2021, she sold original digital art in the form of non-fungible tokens for $5.8 million. In May 2022, she said on Twitter she was joining the board of Unicorn DAO, "to help their mission to fund/ develop female and non-binary lead [sic] art and projects."

== Personal life ==
Grimes's brother Mac Boucher has played a role in creating a number of her music videos including "Violence", "Go", "Realiti", and "Venus Fly", among others. She and her stepbrother, who raps under the name Jay Worthy, collaborated on the single "Christmas Song", released on the Rough Trade bonus disc of her Visions album.

In 2009, Grimes and a friend attempted to travel down the Mississippi River to New Orleans from Minneapolis in a houseboat they built. Following several mishaps, including engine trouble and encounters with law enforcement, the houseboat was impounded by the city of Minneapolis. Grimes said that elements of the story were exaggerated in the newspapers that reported on it at the time. The adventure has been turned into an animated video narrated by T Bone Burnett.

Grimes has been open about her past drug use, revealing intense periods during the creation of her third album Visions in 2012, during which she "blacked out the windows and did tons of amphetamine and stayed up for three weeks and didn't eat anything." In 2014, she wrote a blog post expressing her aversion to hard drugs.

Grimes embraces her distinctive lisp, and has expressed no desire for speech therapy to alter it. Grimes has been diagnosed with autism and ADHD, and has reported having been previously misdiagnosed with restless legs syndrome and schizoaffective disorder. She described personal motor-skill issues when "[she] went to check [her] kids and performed worse than them on every test."

Frequently identified as a feminist musician during her early career, Grimes expressed frustration with this in 2015 by stating that it "really genders [her]" in a way that she does not identify with, adding that she does not relate strongly to female gender identity. Earlier that year, she had posted on Twitter: "I vibe in a gender-neutral space so I'm kinda impartial to pronouns." In 2018, she made another post on the platform stating that she is "personally put off by the word 'woman' at least as far as my self id" and, in 2021, she called herself "female-ish." In 2023, she told an interviewer, "I kinda like the patriarchy", saying "a lot of good things came from it". She went on to clarify, "I think it's sort of oppressive and overly dominant, and if you don't include women in things they can easily become toxic, you know."

In January 2025, Grimes attended a party in Washington, D.C., alongside Curtis Yarvin, to celebrate the second inauguration of Donald Trump.

=== Relationships ===
From 2007 to 2010, Grimes was in an on-and-off relationship with Devon Welsh, then lead vocalist of Majical Cloudz. The two met in 2007 at a first-year dorm party while studying at McGill University. From 2012 to 2018, Grimes was in a relationship with electronic musician Jaime Brooks, who supported her on the Visions Tour performing as Elite Gymnastics.

In 2018, Grimes began a relationship with business magnate Elon Musk. They met after discovering on Twitter that they had both independently made the same pun, combining the 18th-century art style Rococo and the thought experiment Roko's basilisk to create "Rococo's basilisk." In May 2020, Grimes gave birth to their son. Musk and Grimes originally gave the baby the name "X Æ A-12", which would have violated California regulations as it contained characters that are not in the modern English alphabet, which they then changed to "X Æ A-Xii". They have received criticism for choosing a name perceived to be impractical and difficult to pronounce. In 2021, they had a daughter via surrogacy. According to Grimes, Go Won, with whom she collaborated in 2018 on Loona yyxy's "Love4eva", is her eldest son's godmother.

Grimes and Musk "semi-separated" in September 2021. In January 2022, Grimes said of Musk: "I would probably refer to him as my boyfriend, but we're very fluid." Despite fluctuating relationship statuses, in March 2022 Grimes described Musk as her "best friend and the love of my life." In September 2023, it was reported that the couple had another son. Later that month, Grimes sued Musk over parental rights to their children in a California court. Musk allegedly fought to keep the hearing closed, asking for the documents to be sealed. In early 2025, after Musk was accused of performing a Nazi salute during Donald Trump's second inauguration, Grimes denounced Nazism and the "far alt-right." In February 2025, she criticised Musk for bringing their eldest son, X Æ A-Xii, to public events after he was photographed and filmed in the Oval Office.

In March 2024, Grimes revealed she was in a relationship with Italian-American DJ Anyma. Their separation was announced in August 2025.

As of November 2026, Grimes is in a relationship with music producer Elijah Weinkauf.

== Discography ==
Studio albums

- Geidi Primes (2010)
- Halfaxa (2010)
- Visions (2012)
- Art Angels (2015)
- Miss Anthropocene (2020)
- Psy Opera (2027)

== Filmography ==
=== Film and television ===
Film and television credits
Year	Title	Role	Notes	Refs.
2011	Tabula Rasa	Saint-Boniface	Short film	
2018	Hilda	—N/a	34 episodes; theme music composer only	
2020	The Eric Andre Show	Herself	Episode: "The ASAP Ferg Show"	
2021	Saturday Night Live	Princess Peach	Episode: "Elon Musk/Miley Cyrus"; uncredited	
2021	Discord: The Movie	Herself	Short film; cameo	
2021	Alter Ego	Judge	11 episodes	

=== Video games ===
Video games
Year	Title	Voice role	Refs.
2020	Cyberpunk 2077	Lizzy Wizzy	

== Tours ==
=== Headlining ===
- Halfaxa Tour (Canada, 2010) (co-headlined with Pop Winds)
- Visions Tour (World, 2012–2014) (supported by Born Gold, Myths, Elite Gymnastics, Ami Dang)
- Rhinestone Cowgirls Tour (North America, 2015) (supported by Nicole Dollanganger)
- Ac!d Reign Tour (Asia/Europe, 2016) (supported by Hana, Aristophanes, Lupa J)
- March of the Pugs Tour (North America, 2016) (supported by Hana, Tei Shi, Christine and the Queens)

=== Supporting ===
- Lykke Li – Wounded Rhymes Tour (2011)
- Diplo and Skrillex – Full Flex Express Canadian Train Tour (2012)
- Lana Del Rey – The Endless Summer Tour (2015)
- Florence and the Machine – How Beautiful Tour (2016)
- Swedish House Mafia – Paradise Again Tour (2022)
