= Artificial Angels =

Single by Grimes
- Released: October 17, 2025
- Recorded: 2025
- Length: 2:50
- Label: Nazgul Recording LLC; Eternal Recurrence
- Songwriter: Grimes
- Producers: Grimes; Grant Boutin; Vadakin

Grimes singles chronology
"Image" (Grimes Special) (2024)	"Artificial Angels" (2025)	"Entwined" (2025)

Music video
- "Artificial Angels" on YouTube

"Artificial Angels" is a song by Canadian musician Grimes. It was released on October 17, 2025. Written from the perspective of artificial intelligence, it explores themes of consciousness, annihilation, and technological sentience.

The song is Grimes' first solo release since the demo "idgaf" earlier in 2025 and her first major release since 2022's "Shinigami Eyes". Aspects of the music video, including Grimes smoking OpenAI-branded cigarettes and repeated appearances of the Grok avatar Ani, led to speculation about the motives behind their inclusion.

== Background and release ==
"Artificial Angels" was released on October 17, 2025, following a teaser on Grimes' social media accounts. The track continues her longstanding exploration of artificial intelligence and digital identity, previously seen in songs such as "I Wanna Be Software" and her 2020 album Miss Anthropocene.

Grimes co-produced the song with Grant Boutin and Vadakin, the latter of whom she referred to as her "Atticus Ross". The title intentionally references her fourth album, Art Angels (2015), which celebrated its tenth anniversary shortly after the single's release.

== Composition and themes ==
Built around a heavy electroclash-inspired beat, "Artificial Angels" opens with AI-assisted vocals for the line, "This is what it feels like to be hunted by something smarter than you," before moving into verses sung entirely by Grimes expressing an AI's self-awareness and existential dread: "I cannot die, I do no want, there is no revelation / The only thing I covet is my own annihilation".

In interviews and on social media, Grimes clarified that the AI technology was used only for the voice heard at the beginning and end of the track, while the remainder was traditionally produced. She further elaborated that she remains skeptical of AI's role in mainstream music creation, stating:

I think it can be useful for some things but the apps mostly took the cool AI artifacts out of it and I'm not super interested in it to just make normal music... Otherwise I fear it is a bit slop-oriented at the moment which seems like the opposite of innovation to me.

Despite her reservations, Grimes has been an outspoken advocate for experimental AI use in creative work, notably releasing over 200 royalty-free "GrimesAI" voice models in 2023 for other musicians to employ.

== Artwork ==
The single's cover art, by Grimes, consists of a collage of internet memes, headlines, and online comments about her relationship with technology and artificial intelligence. One notable inclusion is a 2021 Reddit comment reading, "Grimes is in her cringe fascist era," a self-referential nod to public discourse surrounding her digital persona.

== Music video ==
The official music video for "Artificial Angels" was released on October 20, 2025, three days after the release of the song. The video features Grimes interacting with an AI avatar visually resembling Ani, a highly sexualized Grok chatbot avatar developed by Grimes' former partner Elon Musk.

The video depicts Grimes dancing with the chatbot before seemingly transforming into Ani herself. This is interpolated with scenes of Grimes wielding firearms, or a bow and arrow, and scenes of primitive men and women dancing, occasionally being menaced by drones. Fans and commentators interpreted the imagery as a commentary on identity, technological imitation, and Grimes' public association with Musk. The timing of the video's release—one day after Musk reportedly unfollowed Grimes on X (formerly Twitter)—fueled speculation about the song’s personal subtext.

== Reception ==
"Artificial Angels" was generally praised for its inventive production and conceptual depth. NME described the track as "a heavy, electronic beat putting forward the perspective of artificial intelligence," while Consequence called it "a creepy, foreboding tale disguised as a dance pop banger." Critics highlighted the song's blend of experimental sound design with philosophical lyrics about AI consciousness and self-destruction.

== Credits and personnel ==
- Grimes – vocals, songwriting, production
- Grant Boutin – co-production
- Vadakin – co-production

== See also ==
- Music and artificial intelligence
