= Geidi Primes =

2010 debut studio album by Grimes

Studio album by Grimes
- Released: January 10, 2010
- Recorded: 2009
- Genres: Dream pop; experimental pop; psychedelia; electronica; lo-fi; bedroom pop
- Length: 31:32
- Label: Arbutus
- Producer: Grimes

Grimes chronology
Lethe (2007)	Geidi Primes (2010)	Halfaxa (2010)

Geidi Primes (/ˈɡeɪdi/ GAY-dee) is the debut studio album by Canadian musician Grimes. It was released through Arbutus Records on January 10, 2010. In 2011, the album was released in the United Kingdom through No Pain in Pop Records on CD and LP, containing a slightly different cover art. Geidi Primes is a concept album based on Frank Herbert's novel Dune and David Lynch's 1984 film adaptation of the book.

On March 1, 2024, coinciding with the release of Dune: Part Two, Grimes released a nightcore version of Geidi Primes.

== Background ==
The album's title refers to the fictional planet Giedi Prime, from the Dune novels by Frank Herbert, originating with the 1965 novel Dune, Grimes' favourite book. "Caladan", the first track, refers to another fictional planet. The next, "Sardaukar Levenbrech", refers to the military rank of Levenbrech — roughly in between a sergeant and a lieutenant — in the Sardaukar army. A Face Dancer, as used in track three's title "Zoal, Face Dancer", is a type of human in the series who can shapeshift. Track six, "Feyd Rautha Dark Heart", refers to Feyd-Rautha Harkonnen, antagonist of the first novel in the Dune series. "Shadout Mapes", the 10th track, refers to a minor character. Track 11, "Beast Infection", refers to the "Beast" the nickname of the character Rabban.

Grimes did not expect that the album would be successful and so assumed that no one would ever hear it. She quotes this as being behind her reasoning for the album title and track names, though has since mentioned that the "decision has kind of haunted me". She has also stated that she now feels that the album was "naïve".

== Composition ==
Geidi Primes has been described as a dream pop, experimental pop, psychedelia, electronica, lo-fi, bedroom pop, folk, drum and bass, and classical album. Thomas A Ward of NME described the album as "a perfect blend of oriental pop, chillwave and post-rock."

== Critical reception ==
Professional ratings
Review scores
Source	Rating
Consequence	4/5 stars
Dummy	8/10
Fact	3.5/5
NME	3.5/5 stars
Pitchfork	7.5/10

Geidi Primes received positive reviews from music critics. Pitchfork's Lindsay Zoladz noted the album has an "eccentric, dreamy sound, which draws upon everything from dubstep to disco, Eastern music to 1990s R&B", adding, "Despite its modest production values and relative simplicity, it's a cohesive, enchanting, and surprisingly assured debut." Zoladz goes on to opine that "perhaps Geidi Primes’s greatest virtue is its resourcefulness", stating that it "excels at crafting evocative moods from deceivingly simple sonic materials and song structures". Of Grimes as a vocalist, Zoladz found that she can "work her range", from her "impressive falsetto" to a "spooky low tone" and her "tuneful deadpan" mid-range. In conclusion, Zoladz stated that "Geidi Primes shows that even her earliest recordings displayed a distinct point of view and an oddly mesmerizing quality [...] a dreamy soundscape that invites an escape from the glitchy universe, a brief provocation to let go and just bliss out."

Siobhán Kane of Consequence described "Caladan" as "almost tribal in conceit"; praised "Rosa" for its "sweet, soft voice coos, soaring around staccato-like percussion"; stated "Venus in Fleurs" brings to mind "a darkly lit underworld that sounds like someone breathing ice". Kane continued, "There is something so unusual about this record, an artifact that sounds as if it is being transmitted from space, as if it were coming from a more creative place than could be found on earth". Thomas A Ward of the NME viewed the album as "an instantly accessible and intimate listen", commending Grimes for her "chameleonic approach" to the genres of the record.

== Track listing ==
All tracks are written by Grimes.

No.	Title	Length
1.	"Caladan"	2:26
2.	"Sardaukar Levenbrech"	2:06
3.	"Zoal, Face Dancer"	2:36
4.	"Rosa"	3:13
5.	"Avi"	2:36
6.	"Feyd Rautha Dark Heart"	3:32
7.	"Gambang"	1:34
8.	"Venus in Fleurs"	2:43
9.	"Grisgris"	3:23
10.	"Shadout Mapes"	4:32
11.	"Beast Infection"	2:21
Total length:		31:32

== Personnel ==
Credits adapted from the liner notes of Geidi Primes.

- Grimes – vocals, production, artwork
- Erik Zuuring – design, layout
- Sebastian Cowan – mastering

== Release history ==
Region	Date	Label	Format(s)
Canada	January 10, 2010	Arbutus Records	Cassette (limited to 30 copies); digital download
United Kingdom	September 19, 2011	No Pain in Pop	CD; LP
Canada	January 31, 2012	Arbutus Records	CD
