= Genesis (Grimes song) =

Single by Grimes

from the album Visions
- B-side: "Ambrosia"
- Released: 2012
- Recorded: August 2011
- Genre: Synth-pop; electropop
- Length: 4:15
- Label: 4AD
- Songwriter(s): Grimes
- Producer(s): Grimes

Grimes singles chronology
"Genesis" (2012)	"Phone Sex" (2012)

Music video
- "Genesis" on YouTube

"Genesis" is a song by Canadian singer and songwriter Grimes, released in 2012, as the lead single from her third studio album, Visions (2012). The song is one of Grimes' most successful releases so far, as a result of the song's music videos becoming viral, mostly through micro-blogging site Tumblr. The NME placed the song at number 16 on its list of 50 Best Tracks of 2012.

== Music video ==
The self-directed video for "Genesis" premiered on August 22, 2012. It was filmed in Los Angeles and co-stars rapper and stripper Brooke Candy, whom Grimes describes as "a very contemporary muse". In the video, Grimes is seen alongside a group of friends while driving an Escalade in the desert, holding an albino python in the back of a limousine, and posing in the woods. She said of the concept of the video: "It's loosely based on this painting by my favorite painter, Hieronymus Bosch, called The Seven Deadly Sins and the Four Last Things. I wanted to play with Medieval/Catholic imagery. I was raised in a Catholic household and went to a Catholic school, and my childhood brain perceived medieval Catholicism as an action movie: There's this crazy omnipresent guy who can destroy you at any moment."

== Charts ==
Chart (2012)	Peak position
UK Indie (OCC)	37
Mexico (Mexico Ingles Airplay, Billboard)	44

== Certifications ==
Region	Certification	Certified units/sales
United Kingdom (BPI)	Gold	400,000^{‡}
United States (RIAA)	Gold	500,000^{‡}
^{‡} Sales+streaming figures based on certification alone.

== Track listings ==
- Digital download
1. "Genesis" – 4:15
- Limited-edition cassette single

A. "Genesis" – 4:15
B. "Ambrosia" – 3:31
