= D'Eon (musician) =

Canadian electronic musician

d'Eon
- Also known as: Kallisti; D. Jung; Eva Weishaupt
- Born: Chris d'Eon; 1985 (age 40–41)
- Origin: Dartmouth, Nova Scotia, Canada
- Genres: Electronica; experimental; avant-garde; R&B; world; ambient
- Occupations: Singer-songwriter, musician, producer, composer
- Instruments: Vocals, keyboards, dramyin
- Years active: 2009–present
- Labels: Hausu Mountain; Hippos in Tanks; Arbutus
- Member of: Omon Ra II

Chris d'Eon (born 1985), mononymously known as d'Eon, is a Canadian electronic musician, singer-songwriter, producer, and composer based in Montreal, Quebec. He is known for his musical eclectism, which encompasses various elements of electronica, pop, avant-garde music, and world music.

== Early life ==
Chris d'Eon began making music at four years old after receiving synthesizers and a sequencer from his parents. He took professional music courses as a teenager before dropping out of his studies entirely.

In 2008, d'Eon travelled to the Himalayas and was taught how to play the dramyin by a Tibetan musician. During this trip, he moved to the Dip Tse Chok Ling monastery and didn't speak for months. This trip greatly influenced his musical eclecticism, as upon returning to Canada, d'Eon began incorporating dramyin and other elements of Eastern music into his music.

== Career ==
=== 2009–2010: Wa Al-'Asr, Æon, and Palinopsia ===
d'Eon's first music released was the second half of a split album with Omon Ra, released on May 21, 2009. This would be the first in a series of five cassettes produced and distributed between 2009 and 2010 with d'Eon as a performer, three featuring him as a solo artist. Among these is d'Eon's debut album, Wa Al-'Asr, which was released on November 4, 2009 through Numbers Station Recordings. The song "Tear Down the Wall" from Wa Al-'Asr received a music video directed by Matthew Wilson, who later joined d'Eon in psychedelic rock band Omon Ra II.

Subsequent cassette tapes released during 2010 through Numbers Station included d'Eon's second album Æon, a second split album with Canadian musician Dirty Beaches and d'Eon as a part of Omon Ra II as the group's first and only project, and a four-track EP titled Swan Covers near the end of the year, which was composed of d'Eon's own interpolations of songs by experimental rock band Swans. Palinopsia, d'Eon's third album, was also released later in the year through Hippos in Tanks to commercial success.

=== 2011–2012: Darkbloom, Music for Keyboards, and LP ===
On April 18, 2011, d'Eon released a subsequent release titled Darkbloom, a split EP featuring fellow Canadian musician Grimes which gained attention from various music publications, including Spin, Pitchfork, and Exclaim!. On June 23, 2011, d'Eon also released an EP of instrumental outtakes from the production of Darkbloom entitled Darkbloom Sessions through SoundCloud.

On March 6, 2012, d'Eon released a free mixtape titled Music for Keyboards Vol. I, which was described as a "prelude" to his next upcoming album and compiled miscellaneous, mostly unreleased instrumentals spanning back to 2003. The mixtape was soon followed by Music for Keyboards Vol. II: "What's My Age Again" Variantions and four further installments in the series were released in the following years, with the most recent being Music for Keyboards Vol. VI released on March 29, 2019.

d'Eon's highly anticipated fourth album, LP, was released on July 10, 2012 to significant praise.

=== 2013–2018: Foxconn / Trios and side projects ===
d'Eon began working on music under the side project Kallisti in 2013. Between working on the Kallisti project and his Music for Keyboards series, d'Eon released his fifth album Foxconn / Trios on November 27, 2015. Similar to Darkbloom Sessions, d'Eon released a companion EP to Foxconn / Trios entitled Foxconn / Trios Sessions.

On August 11, 2016, d'Eon released an album entitled Patriot as Eva Weishaupt, a more political side project. He also contributed the track "WHAT'S IN YOUR CLOSET?" to the political compilation album World War 2020 - Episode Four (2016 Version): WikiLeaks vs. DNC under the Eva Weishaupt alias.

=== 2019–present: Rhododendron and Leviathan ===
On March 6, 2019, d'Eon returned from a musical hiatus with his sixth studio album Six Trios. Earlier that year and under the new side project D. Jung, d'Eon had released an album titled Griffintown Swing on February 21, inspired by the neighborhood of Griffintown where he once lived. d'Eon also returned to music in his Kallisti project, releasing the album The Rave is Not a Sacred Place on April 13, 2019 through B&R Records, his new record label for his projects as Kallisti and D. Jung.

d'Eon released his seventh album From the Root of Jesse Sprouts a Splendid Flower on February 13, 2020, the album based around religion and Christianity. In 2021, he released three studio albums, including his eighth album Four Trios, which continued in the musical direction of his album Six Trios, and his ninth album Bijoux, both released in February of that year.

On August 13, 2021, d'Eon released his tenth studio album Rhododendron through Hausu Mountain Records, marking his first release in six years to be released in physical format. Rhododendron gained attention from various music publications upon its release and was praised for its musical diversity. The song "Rhododendron pt. I" also received a music video directed by the Stiner Brothers.

On June 21, 2024, d'Eon released his eleventh studio album Leviathan, also through Hausu Mountain. Like its preceding album, it also received a release on cassette tape and CD respectively.

== Sound and image ==
d'Eon's music has been met with critical acclaim. Andy Kellman of Allmusic compared his musical style to "vintage new age and contemporary experimental electronic artists, '80s mainstream pop, throwback house, and left-of-center R&B" and noted "Arabic, Iranian, and Turkish" influences. He was also compared to Oneohtrix Point Never and DJ Deeon. Alex Hudson of Exclaim! describes d'Eon's music as a juxtaposition of genres such as "Chicago footwork, new jack swing, UK drum & bass and trip hop". Ambient and Tibetan music elements in his music have also been noted.

== Personal life ==
d'Eon is a Catholic.

== Discography ==
=== Studio albums ===
Title	Details	Ref.
Omon Ra / Chris d'Eon (with Omon Ra)	Released: 2009; Label: Divorce; Formats: Cassette, digital download	
Wa Al-'Asr	Released: 2009; Label: Numbers Station; Formats: Cassette, digital download	
Æon	Released: January 7, 2010; Label: Numbers Station; Formats: Cassette, digital download	
Omon Ra II / Dirty Beaches (as part of Omon Ra II with Dirty Beaches)	Released: April 2010; Label: Campaign for Infinity; Formats: Cassette, digital download	
Palinopsia	Released: October 31, 2010; Label: Hippos in Tanks; Formats: LP, digital download	
LP	Released: June 4, 2012; Label: Hippos in Tanks; Formats: CD, LP, digital download	
Foxconn / Trios	Released: November 27, 2015; Label: Knives; Format: LP, digital download	
Patriot (as Eva Weishaupt)	Released: August 11, 2016; Label: B&R Records; Format: Digital download	
Griffintown Swing (as D. Jung)	Released: February 21, 2019; Label: B&R Records; Format: Digital download	
Six Trios	Released: March 6, 2019; Label: Self-released; Formats: Digital download	
The Rave Is Not a Sacred Space (as Kallisti)	Released: April 13, 2019; Label: B&R Records; Formats: Digital download	
From the Root of Jesse Proceeds a Splendid Flower	Released: February 13, 2020; Label: Self-released; Formats: Digital download	
Four Trios	Released: February 4, 2021; Label: Self-released; Formats: Digital download	
Bijoux	Released: February 22, 2021; Label: Self-released; Formats: Digital download	
Rhododendron	Released: August 13, 2021; Label: Hausu Mountain; Formats: CD, cassette, digital download	
Leviathan	Released: June 21, 2024; Label: Hausu Mountain; Formats: CD, cassette, digital download	

=== Mixtapes ===
Title	Details
Cruel New Decade	Released: August 11, 2010; Label: Self-released; Formats: Digital download
Ghosthack	Released: May 13, 2011; Label: Le Venerdì Mixtape; Formats: Digital download
Music for Keyboards Vol. I	Released: March 6, 2012; Label: Self-released; Formats: Digital download
Music for Keyboards Vol. II: "What's My Age Again" Variations	Released: April 26, 2012; Label: Self-released; Formats: Digital download
Music for Keyboards Vol. III: Symphonie No. 1 "Patriote"	Released: October 27, 2012; Label: Self-released; Formats: Digital download
Music for Keyboards Vol. IV: "Blackout"	Released: August 19, 2013; Label: Self-released; Formats: Digital download
Music for Keyboards Vol. V: "Robby"	Released: September 9, 2014; Label: Self-released; Formats: Digital download
Music for Keyboards Vol. VI	Released: March 29, 2019; Label: Self-released; Formats: Digital download

=== Extended plays ===
Title	Details
Swans Covers	Released: 2010; Label: Palimpsest; Formats: Cassette
Darkbloom (with Grimes)	Released: April 18, 2011; Label: Arbutus, Hippos in Tanks; Formats: CD, LP, digital download
Darkbloom Sessions	Released: June 23, 2011; Label: Self-released; Formats: Digital download
Dhikr Remembrance of God (Note: Dhikr Remembrance of God is a compilation EP of d'Eon's side of Omon Ra / Chris d'Eon and "Haydar" from Wa Al-'Asr.)	Released: August 18, 2011; Label: Self-released; Formats: Digital download
Arc of Fire (as Kallisti)	Released: December 1, 2013; Label: B&R Records; Formats: Digital download
Foxconn / Trios Sessions	Released: 2015; Label: Self-released; Formats: Digital download
Phony Assets (as Kallisti)	Released: February 3, 2020; Label: B&R Records; Formats: Digital download

=== Mixes ===
- FACT Mix 338 (2012, FACT magazine)
- The Lord Himself Is the Farm, Himself He Grows and Grinds (2012, DIS)
- D'Eon Live Set Boiler Room Montreal
- Extracts from the Erisian Front 1
- NTS Session: 26-9-16

=== Music videos ===
- "Tear Down the Wall" (2009, directed by Matthew Wilson)
- "Kill a Man with a Joystick in Your Hand" (2010, directed by Todd Ledford)
- "Keep The Faith" (2010, directed by Christian "Megazord" Oldham)
- "Transparency" (2011, directed by Grimes)
- "Arc of Fire" (2013, directed by Lorenzo Senni)
- "Rhododendron Pt. I" (2021, directed by Stiner Brothers)
- "Installation of the Cisterns" (2024, directed by Clark Woods)
- "Leviathan" (2024, directed by Clark Woods)
