= Halfaxa =

2010 studio album by Grimes

Studio album by Grimes
- Released: September 30, 2010
- Genres: Witch house; goth-pop; darkwave; glo-fi; experimental
- Length: 55:07
- Labels: Arbutus; Lo
- Producer: Grimes

Grimes chronology
| Geidi Primes (2010) | Halfaxa (2010) | Darkbloom (2011) |

Alternative cover
- Lo Recordings cover

Professional ratings
Review scores
| Source | Rating |
|---|---|
| Drowned in Sound | 7/10 |
| Dummy | 7/10 |
| Pitchfork | 7.8/10 |

Halfaxa is the second studio album by Canadian electronic music artist Grimes. It was released in Canada on October 5, 2010, by Arbutus Records, and in the United Kingdom and mainland Europe in May 2011 by Lo Recordings.

== Background ==
Grimes described Halfaxa as "dark" but created at a more positive point in her life, contrasting with the other albums she had produced. The album is mostly inspired by her time in Halifax, Nova Scotia, while staying at her friend's home.

== Composition ==
Halfaxa has been described as a goth-pop, witch house, dark wave, and glo-fi release, as well as featuring influences of glitch pop, R&B, techno, industrial, and electro. Grimes has said Halfaxa was created to "evoke the feeling of believing in God in a very Medieval Christian way", and has described it as her "medieval" album.

== Track listing ==
All tracks are written by Claire Boucher.

| No. | Title | Length |
|---|---|---|
| 1. | "Outer" | 1:12 |
| 2. | "Intor / Flowers" (deliberately misspelled; titled as "Intro / Flowers" on most digital releases) | 2:50 |
| 3. | "Weregild" | 5:14 |
| 4. | "∆∆∆∆Rasik∆∆∆∆" (deleted from digital releases and pressings made by Arbutus Records in 2016 and later) | 1:50 |
| 5. | "Heartbeats" (bonus track exclusive to the Lo Recordings releases) | 4:32 |
| 6. | "Sagrad Прекрасный" | 5:13 |
| 7. | "Dragvandil" | 1:39 |
| 8. | "Devon" | 4:31 |
| 9. | "Dream Fortress" | 5:01 |
| 10. | "World ♡ Princess" | 4:41 |
| 11. | "† River †" | 1:57 |
| 12. | "Swan Song" | 3:05 |
| 13. | "≈Ω≈Ω≈Ω≈Ω≈Ω≈Ω≈Ω≈Ω≈" (titled as "Omega" on some releases) | 2:14 |
| 14. | "My Sister Says the Saddest Things" | 4:12 |
| 15. | "Hallways" | 5:44 |
| 16. | "Favriel" | 2:36 |
| Total length: | | 55:07 |

Notes

- On the Lo Recordings version, the tracks: 1, 2, 4, 6 are stylised in lowercase and 9, 10 are stylised as "Dreamfortress" and "world♡princess."
- On some digital releases, "∆∆∆∆Rasik∆∆∆∆" is simply titled "rasik".

== Personnel ==
Credits adapted from the liner notes of Halfaxa.

- Grimes – vocals, production, composition, illustrations
- Jasper Baydala – design
- Sebastian Cowan – mastering (tracks 1–4, tracks 6–16)
- Antony Ryan – mastering (track 5)

== Release history ==
| Country | Date | Label | Format(s) |
|---|---|---|---|
| Canada | September 30, 2010 | Arbutus Records | Digital download |
| United States | September 30, 2010 | Arbutus Records | Digital download |
| Canada | October 5, 2010 | Arbutus Records | CD |
| Australia | February 28, 2011 | Lo Recordings | Digital download |
| France | February 28, 2011 | Lo Recordings | Digital download |
| Germany | February 28, 2011 | Lo Recordings | Digital download |
| United Kingdom | February 28, 2011 | Lo Recordings | Digital download |
| Germany | March 11, 2011 | Lo Recordings | CD |
| United Kingdom | March 14, 2011 | Lo Recordings | CD; LP |
| France | March 16, 2011 | Loreley | CD; LP |
| Australia | March 30, 2011 | Lo Recordings | CD |
| Germany | April 22, 2011 | Lo Recordings | LP |
| United States | January 31, 2012 | Arbutus Records | CD |
| United States | April 1, 2016 | Arbutus Records | LP |
