= Darkbloom (EP) =

EP by Grimes and d'Eon
- Released: April 18, 2011
- Genres: Electropop; R&B; avant-pop
- Length: 36:19
- Labels: Arbutus; Hippos in Tanks
- Producers: Grimes; d'Eon

Grimes chronology
Halfaxa (2010)	Darkbloom (2011)	Visions (2012)

d'Eon chronology
Palinopsia (2010)	Darkbloom (2011)	LP (2012)

Professional ratings
Review scores
Source	Rating
Cokemachineglow	81%
Fact	3/5
Pitchfork	7.2/10

Darkbloom is a split EP by Canadian musicians Grimes and d'Eon. It was released on April 18, 2011, as a joint release through Grimes' and d'Eon's respective labels, Arbutus Records and Hippos in Tanks. Darkbloom was conceived together by Grimes and d'Eon but recorded separately.

Grimes directed the video for "Vanessa" herself after reportedly being unhappy with the video made for "Crystal Ball". It was Claire Boucher's (Grimes) directorial debut. She also directed and co-starred in the D'Eon video for "Transparency." Both videos were released on the same day in April 2011. Tim Kelly's video for "Crystal Ball" had been filmed earlier but was released in May.

== Track listing ==
Tracks 1–5 performed, written and produced by Grimes. Tracks 6–9 performed, written and produced by d'Eon.

No.	Title	Length
1.	"Orphia"	1:09
2.	"Vanessa"	5:24
3.	"Crystal Ball"	3:16
4.	"Urban Twilight"	4:16
5.	"Hedra"	3:39
6.	"Telepathy"	3:03
7.	"Thousand Mile Trench"	6:00
8.	"Tongues"	4:02
9.	"Transparency"	5:30

== Personnel ==
Credits adapted from Darkbloom album liner notes.

- Grimes – vocals, producer (tracks: 1–5)
- d'Eon – vocals, producer (tracks: 6–9)
- Jasper Baydala – design
- Sebastian Cowan – additional mixing
- Sadaf Hakimian – photography
- Tyler Los-Jones – insert

== Release history ==
Country	Date	Label	Format
United Kingdom	April 18, 2011	Arbutus Records, Hippos in Tanks	Digital download
Canada	April 19, 2011	Arbutus Records, Hippos in Tanks	CD
Canada	May 10, 2011	Arbutus Records, Hippos in Tanks	12"
Canada	May 17, 2011	Arbutus Records, Hippos in Tanks	Digital download
United States	May 17, 2011	Arbutus Records, Hippos in Tanks	Digital download
