= Oblivion (Grimes song) =

Promotional single by Grimes

from the album Visions
- Released: 2012
- Recorded: August 2011
- Genre: Synth-pop; electropop; dream pop; experimental pop
- Length: 4:11
- Label: 4AD
- Songwriter: Grimes
- Producer: Grimes

Music video
- "Oblivion" at YouTube

"Oblivion" is a song by Canadian musician Grimes from her third studio album, Visions (2012). It was released as a promotional single in 2012 by the British record label 4AD.

== Creation ==
In an April 2012 interview with Jacinda Govind for Music Feeds, Grimes explained that the song is about a violent assault:

It made me crazy for a few years. I got really paranoid walking around at night and started feeling really unsafe. The song is more about empowering myself physically amongst a masculine power, and the hate of feeling powerless, making light of masculine physical power, making it jovial and non-threatening. I took a typically violent cultural situation and made it pop and happy.

Chandler Levack for CBC in 2020 and Caz Tran for ABC in 2022 have reported on Grimes' sexual assault, with Tran writing that "as a survivor of a violent sexual assault, 'Oblivion' was the result of [Grimes'] most determined efforts to turn feelings of fear and paranoia into something light hearted and innocuous".

The song's title is in reference to the short story collection of the same name by David Foster Wallace, who had committed suicide four years before the song's release. In an interview with Hunger magazine, she said, "[Reading] is a huge part of my creative process. I'm probably as inspired by literature as I am by music."

== Composition ==
"Oblivion" has been described as electropop, synth-pop, dream pop, experimental pop, with a "futurepop beat". The song was described by NME as "Kraftwerk teaming up with Blondie for a rework of 'Heart of Glass' and performing it several hundred leagues under the sea".

== Critical reception ==
It is one of Grimes' most successful releases and was ranked at number 38 on Australian alternative music station Triple J's 2012 Hottest 100 countdown. It was named the best song of 2012 on Pitchfork, which in 2019 also named it the second best song of the decade. It placed at number 229 on NME magazine's list of the 500 Greatest Songs of All Time.

== Music video ==
The music video was co-directed by Grimes and Emily Kai Bock, on a "shoe string budget". It features Grimes, in a black coat and her signature pink hair, with headphones on at a sporting match with a largely male crowd. It was shot in Montreal at Olympic Stadium and at McGill University's Molson Stadium, during a football game and a supercross event.

The video debuted on March 2, 2012 and shows Grimes amongst shirtless frat boys, as well as in a men's locker room surrounded by weightlifting athletes.

Grimes stated for Pitchfork:

Art gives me an outlet where I can be aggressive in a world where I usually can't be, and part of it was asserting this abstract female power in these male-dominated arenas—the video is somewhat about objectifying men. Not in a disrespectful way, though.

In an interview with Spin; when asked about her "videos [playing] with ... clichés of powerful and powerless female archetypes", she answered:

I was interested in the Japanese archetype of a female protagonist who is very small and very cute and very physically powerful. You don't see that archetype in America. But in Japanese culture, there are female characters who can embody this girl uniform and still cut someone's head off with a sword. "Oblivion" embodies that kind of archetype, going into this masculine world that is associated with sexual assault, but presented as something really welcoming and nice. The song's sort of about being — I was assaulted and I had a really hard time engaging in any types of relationship with men, because I was just so terrified of men for a while.

== Track listing ==
- UK promotional CD-R single
1. "Oblivion" (radio edit) – 3:10
2. "Oblivion" (album version) – 4:11

== Charts ==
Chart (2012)	Peak position
Ireland (IRMA)	92
Mexico Ingles Airplay (Billboard)	39

== Certifications ==
Region	Certification	Certified units/sales
New Zealand (RMNZ)	Platinum	30,000^{‡}
United Kingdom (BPI)	Gold	400,000^{‡}
United States (RIAA)	Gold	500,000^{‡}
^{‡} Sales+streaming figures based on certification alone.

== Use in media ==
- The song was most recently used in the 2024 Netflix documentary “Biggest Heist Ever.”
- The song was used in the short film The Everything directed by Humberto Leon, co-creative director of Kenzo.
- The song was used in an episode of the BBC series, Silent Witness.
- The song was used in the 2019 film, Good Boys.
- The song was used in the second season episode of the Netflix series, Baby.
- The song was used in the BBC/HBO series, I May Destroy You.
- The song was used as the theme song for the PBS series A Brief History of the Future
