= Magdalena Bay discography =

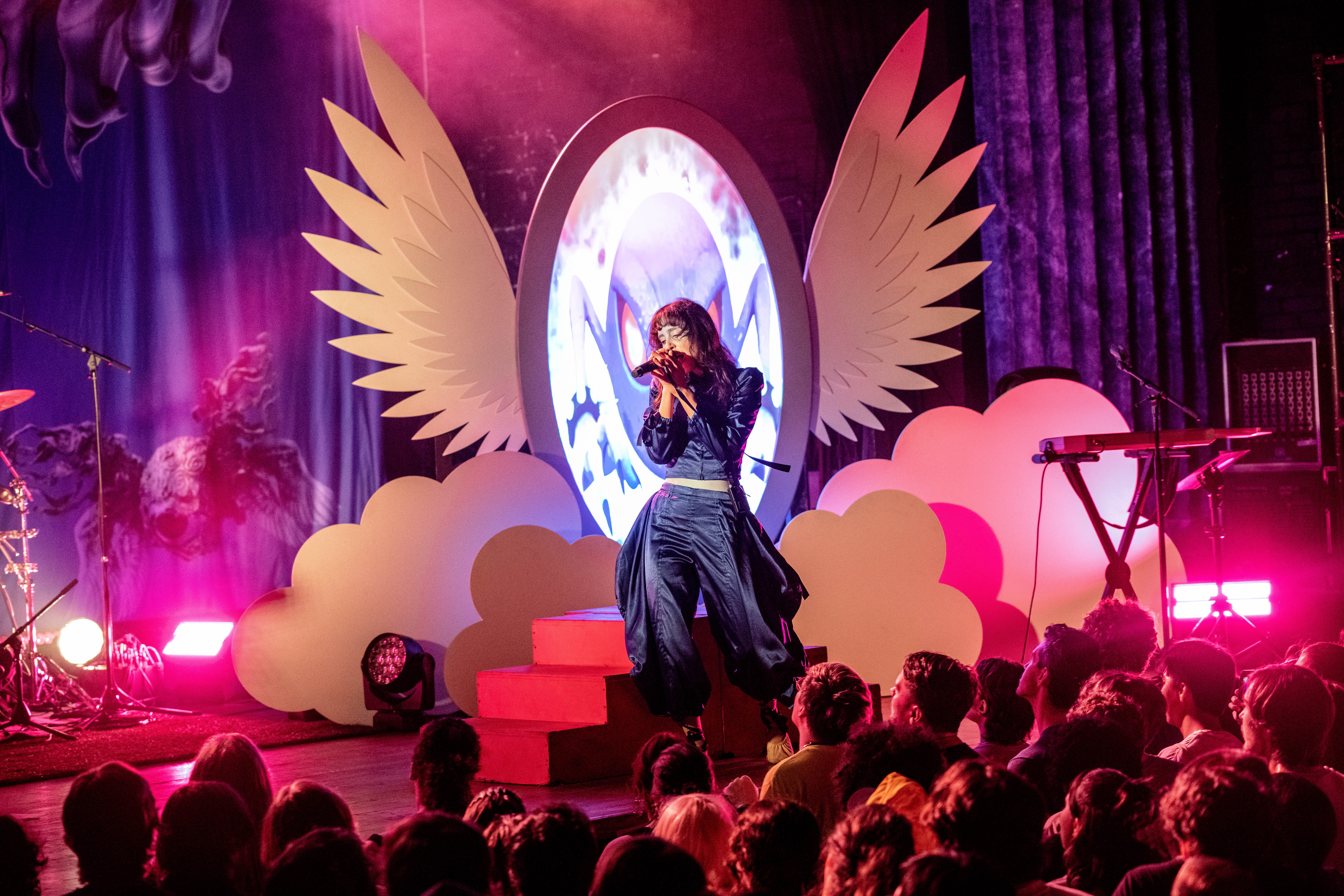
- Studio albums: 2
- EPs: 3
- Mixtapes: 3
- Compilation albums: 2
- Singles: 43
- Music videos: 33

American alternative pop duo Magdalena Bay have released 2 studio albums, 2 compilation albums, 3 extended plays, 3 mixtapes, 35 singles, and 33 music videos.

== Albums ==
=== Studio albums ===
List of studio albums, with selected chart positions, showing other relevant details
Title	Details	Peak chart positions			
Title	Details	US Curr.	US Heat	AUS	UK Down.
Mercurial World	Released: October 8, 2021; Label: Luminelle, The Orchard; Formats: LP, CD, cassette, digital download, streaming	59	18	—	—
Imaginal Disk	Released: August 23, 2024; Label: Mom + Pop Music; Formats: LP, CD, streaming	17	6	38	33

=== Compilation albums ===
Title	Details
Mini Mix, Vol. 1–3	Released: August 1, 2025; Label: Luminelle Recordings; Formats: LP
Nice Day: A Collection of Singles	Release date: April 17, 2026; Label: Mom + Pop Music; Formats: 4 7-inch vinyls

== Mixtapes ==
Title	Details
Mini Mix, Vol. 1	Released: July 19, 2019; Label: Luminelle Recordings; Formats: 10-inch vinyl, cassette, digital download, streaming
Mini Mix, Vol. 2	Released: November 20, 2020; Label: Luminelle Recordings; Formats: 10-inch vinyl, digital download, streaming
Mini Mix, Vol. 3	Released: April 13, 2023; Label: Luminelle Recordings; Formats: 10-inch vinyl, digital download, streaming

== Extended plays ==
Title	Details
Day/Pop	Released: January 15, 2019; Label: Self-released; Formats: Digital download, streaming
Night/Pop	Released: January 17, 2019; Label: Self-released; Formats: Digital download, streaming
A Little Rhythm and a Wicked Feeling	Released: March 13, 2020; Label: Luminelle Recordings; Formats: Digital download, streaming, vinyl

== Singles ==
=== As lead artist ===
Title	Year	Certifications	Album
"Voc Pop"	2016		Non-album single
"Head Over Heels"	2016		Day/Pop
"#wastehistime"	2017		Day/Pop
"Neon"	2017		Night/Pop
"Set Me Off"	2017		Day/Pop
"Redbone"	2017		Night/Pop
"Drive Alone"	2017		Night/Pop
"Move Slow"	2017		Night/Pop
"Waking Up"	2018		Day/Pop
"The Girls"	2018		Non-album singles
"Ghost"	2018		Non-album singles
"Money Lover"	2019		Non-album singles
"Only If You Want It"	2019		Non-album singles
"Mine"	2019		Mini Mix, Vol. 1
"Venice"	2019		A Little Rhythm and a Wicked Feeling
"Good Intentions"	2019		A Little Rhythm and a Wicked Feeling
"Killshot"	2019	RIAA: Gold; BPI: Silver; RMNZ: Gold	A Little Rhythm and a Wicked Feeling
"Oh Hell"	2019		A Little Rhythm and a Wicked Feeling
"How to Get Physical"	2020		A Little Rhythm and a Wicked Feeling
"Airplane"	2020		A Little Rhythm and a Wicked Feeling
"Story" (Gus Kero Kero Bonito remix)	2020		Non-album single
"Live 4ever"	2020		Mini Mix, Vol. 2
"Woww"	2020		Mini Mix, Vol. 2
"Hideaway"	2020		Mini Mix, Vol. 2
"Sky2Fall"	2020		Mini Mix, Vol. 2
"Killshot" (Slowed + Reverb)	2021		Non-album single
"Chaeri"	2021		Mercurial World
"Secrets (Your Fire)"	2021		Mercurial World
"You Lose!"	2021		Mercurial World
"Hysterical Us"	2021		Mercurial World
"Chaeri" (Danny L Harle remix)	2022		Mercurial World (Deluxe)
"Shotgun" (Magdalena Bay remix) (with Soccer Mommy)	2022		Non-album single
"All You Do"	2022		Mercurial World (Deluxe)
"Unconditional"	2022		Mercurial World (Deluxe)
"Death & Romance"	2024		Imaginal Disk
"Image" (solo or Grimes Special)	2024		Imaginal Disk
"Tunnel Vision"	2024		Imaginal Disk
"That's My Floor"	2024		Imaginal Disk
"Ashes to Ashes" (Triple J Like a Version)	2025		Non-album single
"Second Sleep / Star Eyes"	2025		Nice Day: A Collection of Singles
"Human Happens / Paint Me a Picture"	2025		Nice Day: A Collection of Singles
"Unoriginal / Black-Eyed Susan Climb"	2025		Nice Day: A Collection of Singles
"This Is The World (I Made It For You) / Nice Day"	2025		Nice Day: A Collection of Singles

=== As featured artist ===
Title	Year	Album
"Power" (Disco Shrine featuring Magdalena Bay)	2019	Xoxo, Disco
"Superficial Love" (Calica featuring Magdalena Bay)	2020	Non-album single
"Push Me Away" (Jordana featuring Magdalena Bay)	2021	Non-album single
"Disappearing" (Blu DeTiger featuring Magdalena Bay)	2024	All I Ever Want Is Everything

== Guest appearances ==
List of non-charting, non-single guest appearances, showing year released, other artist(s), and associated album name
Title	Year	Other artist(s)	Album
"Messy Hair"	2025	TV Girl, George Clanton	Fauxllennium (Japanese deluxe edition)

== Music videos ==
All music videos released via the band's official YouTube channel.

Title	Year	Director
"Head over Heels" (Tears for Fears cover)	2016	Sally Hunter and Mica Tenenbaum
"Neon"	2017	Matthew Lewin
"The Girls"	2018	Mica Tenenbaum and Matthew Lewin
"Ghost"	2018	Mica Tenenbaum and Matthew Lewin
"Money Lover"	2019	Mica Tenenbaum and Matthew Lewin
"Afternoon in Heaven"	2019	Mica Tenenbaum and Matthew Lewin
"Turning Off the Rain"	2019	Mica Tenenbaum and Matthew Lewin
"El Dorado"	2019	Mica Tenenbaum and Matthew Lewin
"Only If You Want It"	2019	Mica Tenenbaum and Matthew Lewin
"U Wanna Dance?"	2019	Mica Tenenbaum and Matthew Lewin
"Mine"	2019	Mica Tenenbaum and Matthew Lewin
"Nothing Baby"	2019	Mica Tenenbaum and Matthew Lewin
"NeverEnding Story" (Mini cover)	2019	Mica Tenenbaum and Matthew Lewin
"Venice"	2019	Pete Ohs
"Good Intentions"	2019	Mica Tenenbaum and Matthew Lewin
"Killshot"	2019	Mica Tenenbaum and Matthew Lewin
"How to Get Physical"	2020	Mica Tenenbaum and Matthew Lewin
"Live 4ever"	2020	Mica Tenenbaum and Matthew Lewin
"Woww"	2020	Mica Tenenbaum and Matthew Lewin
"Hideaway"	2020	Mica Tenenbaum and Matthew Lewin
"Sky2Fall"	2020	Mica Tenenbaum and Matthew Lewin
"Body"	2020	Mica Tenenbaum and Matthew Lewin
"I Don't Want to Cry Anymore"	2021	Mica Tenenbaum and Matthew Lewin
"Chaeri"	2021	Luke Orlando
"Secrets (Your Fire)"	2021	Mica Tenenbaum and Matthew Lewin
"You Lose!"	2021	Mica Tenenbaum and Matthew Lewin
"Hysterical Us"	2021	Ian Clontz
"Dreamcatching"	2022	Felix Geen
"All You Do"	2022	Luke Orlando
"Unconditional"	2022	Mica Tenenbaum and Matthew Lewin
"The Beginning"	2022	Michael Garber
"Death & Romance"	2024	Amanda Kramer
"Image"	2024	Amanda Kramer
"That's My Floor"	2024	Amanda Kramer
"Second Sleep"	2025	Amalia Irons

== Production discography ==
Title	Year	Artist(s)	Album
"Running Out of Time"	2023	Lil Yachty	Let's Start Here
"Wishing On You"	2023	Jihyo	Zone
