= Amanda Kramer (director) =

Director and screenwriter (born 1981)

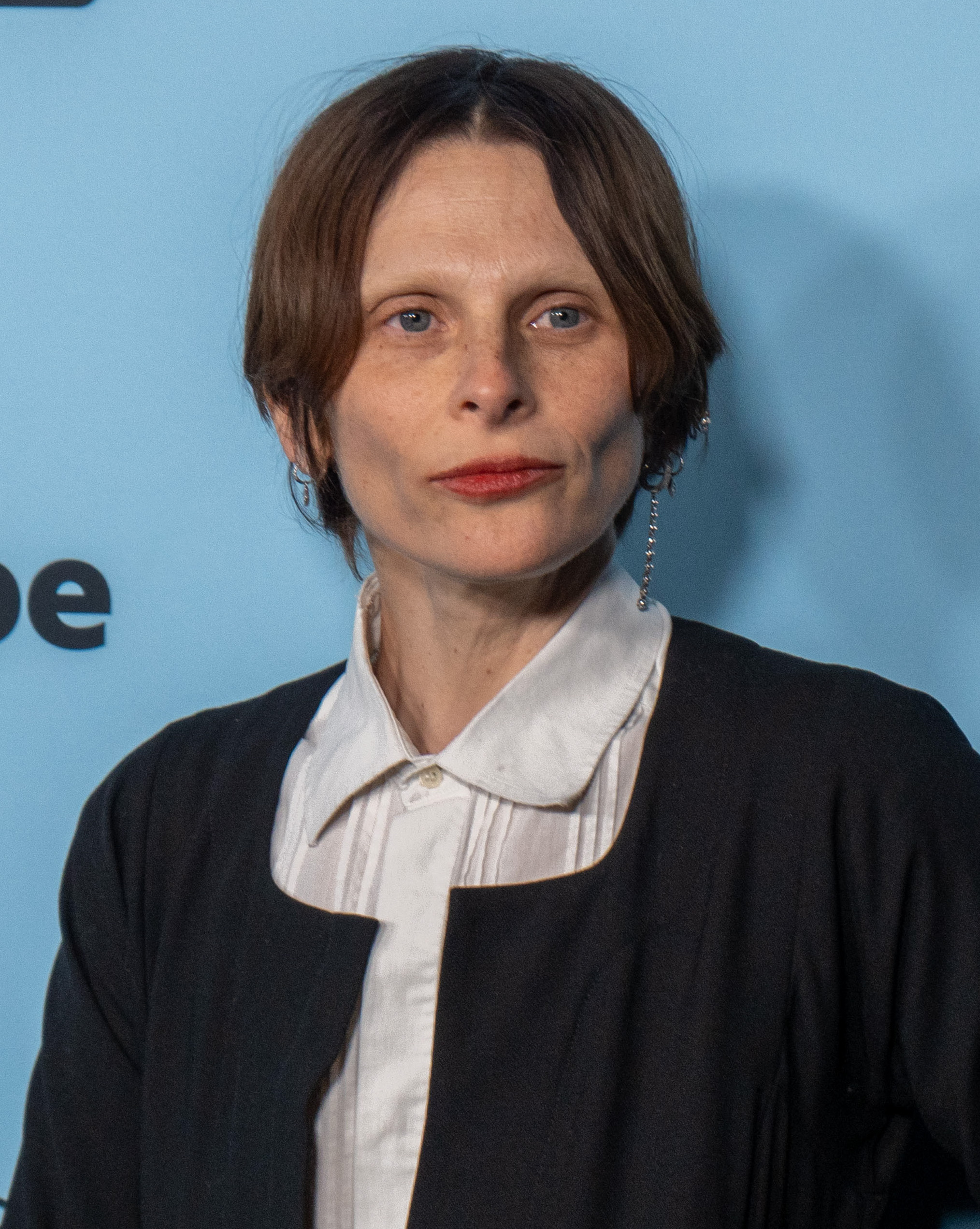
- Kramer in 2025
- Born: September 1, 1981 (age 45)
- Education: Emerson College
- Occupations: Director; screenwriter; producer
- Writing career
- Years active: 2013–present
- Website: www.afilmbyamandakramer.com

Amanda Kramer (born September 1, 1981) is a director, screenwriter, and producer. She is best known for the films Ladyworld (2018), Please Baby Please (2022), and By Design (2025), all of which she wrote and directed.

== Life and career ==
Kramer was born on September 1, 1981. She attended Emerson College in Boston, Massachusetts, with the intent of becoming a playwright and theater director. She graduated from Emerson at 20 years old.

After graduating from college, Kramer moved to Los Angeles, California. She first worked as a vintage clothing buyer upon moving there, though she had ambitions to pursue theater. However, she eventually found that the Los Angeles theater scene was "not very vivid" and decided to focus on other fields, overseeing underground record labels and creating house music.

While living in Los Angeles, Kramer co-founded the underground record label Not Not Fun. She also released music under the name LA Vampires, and was a member of the duo Pocahaunted. Under her LA Vampires moniker, Kramer released collaborative albums with Maria Minerva and Zola Jesus. Kramer appeared in the 2013 documentary Silk, which follows four acts from the Los Angeles-based electronic label 100% Silk as they tour across Europe; she also produced the film. Kramer's debut short film Bark premiered in 2016 at Fantastic Fest.

Kramer began creating her debut film Paris Window, co-written with screenwriter Noel David Taylor, in 2017. A comedy surrounding the destructive relationship between two siblings, the film was primarily shot in Kramer's apartment. She then began principal photography on her next film, the suspense thriller Ladyworld, in January 2018. Co-written with screenwriter Benjamin Shearn, Ladyworld follows a group of teenage girls who, during a sleepover, become trapped in a house after an earthquake. The film was partially inspired by the 1954 William Golding novel Lord of the Flies, and Kramer has emphasized that the need to depict young women's capacity for cruelty was important to her when making the film.

Paris Window premiered on August 15, 2018, at the Women Texas Film Festival. The film was subsequently awarded the Jury Prize for Creative Vision at the Downtown Los Angeles Film Festival in October 2018. Ladyworld premiered on September 22, 2018, at Fantastic Fest, prior to screening at the BFI London Film Festival and the Toronto International Film Festival. On July 29, 2019, four days before the theatrical release of Ladyworld, Talkhouse published an essay of Kramer's entitled "Why Does Everything Look So Fucking Ugly?", a commentary on what she perceived as the visual blandness and homogeneity of contemporary film and television. Ladyworld was then theatrically released on August 2, 2019, followed by a release on DVD and video-on-demand platforms on August 27. Paris Window was later released on Amazon, Vimeo, and Filmhub in 2019. In November 2019, Ethan Warren, a frequent contributor to the film essay website Bright Wall/Dark Room, named Kramer as a director who will define the 2020s in a piece for IndieWire.

On March 18, 2020, the music video for Maya Hawke's song "By Myself," which Kramer directed, was released. Hawke had previously starred in Ladyworld. In October 2020, Kramer began shooting her next feature film, Please Baby Please, again co-written with Noel David Taylor. Starring Andrea Riseborough, Harry Melling, Karl Glusman, and Demi Moore, the film is set in the 1950s and follows a married couple who begin to question their relationship, as well as their own conceptions of gender identity, upon witnessing a murder committed by a group of greasers. While in the process of making Please Baby Please, Kramer began writing the script for her next film, Give Me Pity!, which she has said was born out of frustration with the length of the development process for the former film. "I was like, 'I could do this bare bones, like 10 people, $100,000 or less over the course of five days,'" she said in a 2023 interview with Filmmaker. Give Me Pity! began shooting in July 2021. Starring Sophie von Haselberg, the film parodies variety television specials of the 1970s and 80s as it follows a fictional diva's descent into doubt and self-loathing.

Please Baby Please premiered on January 26, 2022, as the opening film of the 51st International Film Festival Rotterdam. The film then went on to win the Grand Jury Award at the 2022 Outfest Los Angeles LGBTQ Film Festival. The film was released in theaters on October 28, 2022. Give Me Pity! also premiered as an official selection at the 51st International Film Festival Rotterdam. The film was given a New York City theatrical release on February 23, 2023, before being made available to streaming platforms on March 7.

In 2023, So Unreal, Kramer's first documentary feature, premiered at the 18th annual Fantastic Fest. Narrated by Blondie frontwoman Debbie Harry, the film discusses how the evolution of technology has been depicted in film. So Unreal was released in North America in fall 2025.

Kramer's film By Design, starring Juliette Lewis and Mamoudou Athie, premiered at the 2025 Sundance Film Festival. The film follows a woman who swaps bodies with a chair. In 2026, the feature-length visual album for Magdalena Bay's Imaginal Disk, which Kramer directed, premiered at the Tribeca Festival. Segments from the film were initially released as music videos during summer 2024; Kramer is also credited as the director of these individual works. (Note: Music videos are attributed to multiple references:)

== Artistry ==
=== Themes ===
Kramer's work predominantly focuses on gender roles in a patriarchal society, and often centers female characters. She has described the fear of rape as a core thematic component of Ladyworld, which features a disembodied male character whose presence causes unrest among a group of teenage girls trapped in a basement. She has stated that she was drawn to making Please Baby Please in order to challenge the heteronormativity perpetuated in 1950s popular culture, as well as to draw attention to the underground subcultures present during that era. She has also described Please Baby Please as an interrogation of masculinity, as well as the conflicts between violence, desire, and vulnerability therein. "I think any great work of feminism needs to discuss masculinity as much as anything else," she said in Film Comment interview discussing the film.

Regarding her focus on female characters, Kramer has said, "I exist, I think, in a large part, to write great parts for women of all ages. Actresses deserve to have as complex, bizarre, and difficult parts as their male co-stars." She has expressed admiration for actors such as Gena Rowlands, Faye Dunaway, Elizabeth Taylor, and Geneviève Bujold, due to the "ever-operatic, highly created, arch character embodiments" they portray. Kramer has specifically cited Rowlands as an influence on her direction of the Ladyworld cast.

Despite the prominence of women's stories in her work, Kramer has expressed reluctance to identify as a feminist, in part because she feels the word has been co-opted to the point of having several different meanings. She has identified with womanism in her artistry, and has elaborated on this by stating:

My brand of womanism is admittedly rather nasty – women appear as disgusting, disturbed, manipulative, lustful, voracious, willful, over-attuned, vindictive... I could go on. Why? Because obviously we are, but also because I'm working in the surreal and abstract and dramatic and tragic.

=== Style ===
Kramer's films often eschew realism in favor of theatricality, pastiche, and camp aesthetics. She has cited artifice and fantasy as key themes in her work. Kramer believes that experimental and avant-garde filmmaking can be used to challenge patriarchal narrative strictures in art. Additionally, though all of her narrative features are written as screenplays, many of her works resemble stage plays, due to their heavy amount of dialogue and spare set dressing. "I just don't think I know how to write films," she said in a 2019 interview with Rough Cut. "So I just write plays and shoot them. It's really lazy, actually. But I set it up like a stage because that's how I can visualize it." Kramer does not conduct formal auditions, instead preferring to become acquainted with an actor's personality, as well as their willingness to take risks, before determining whether they are right for a role.

=== Influences ===
Kramer participated in the 2022 Sight and Sound decennial poll of the greatest films of all time. Her selections were as follows:

- The Cook, The Thief, His Wife & Her Lover (1989)
- Without You I'm Nothing (1990)
- Stardust Memories (1980)
- All That Jazz (1979)
- Ali: Fear Eats the Soul (1974)
- Cruising (1980)
- Safe (1995)
- The Player (1992)
- Basic Instinct (1992)
- Caché (2005)

== Filmography ==
=== Feature films ===
Year	Title	Notes
2013	Silk	Documentary; appears as self; also producer
2018	Paris Window	
2018	Ladyworld	
2022	Please Baby Please	
2022	Give Me Pity!	Also producer
2023	So Unreal	Documentary; also producer
2025	By Design	
2026	Imaginal Disk	

=== Short films ===
Year	Title	Notes	Ref.
2016	Bark		
2017	Intervene		
2017	Requests	Also producer	
2019	Sin Ultra	Also producer	

=== Music videos ===
Year	Song	Artist	Ref.
2018	"Bag Away"	Harriet Brown	
2018	"To Hop Woo, Thanks For Everything My G"	Moisture Boys	
2020	"By Myself"	Maya Hawke	
2023	"The Gift"	Sarabeth Tucek	
2024	"Death & Romance"	Magdalena Bay	
2024	"Image"	Magdalena Bay	
2024	"That's My Floor"	Magdalena Bay	

== Awards and nominations ==
Year	Association	Category	Work	Result	Ref.
2018	Downtown Los Angeles Film Festival	Jury Prize for Creative Vision: Feature	Paris Window	Won	
2022	Outfest	Grand Jury Award: North American Narrative Feature	Please Baby Please	Won	
