= Imaginal Disk (film) =

2026 film by Amanda Kramer

- Festival poster
- Directed by: Amanda Kramer
- Written by: Mica Tenenbaum; Matthew Lewin
- Produced by: Katie White; Doug Klinger
- Starring: Mica Tenenbaum; Matthew Lewin; James Jelin; Liza Babin; Megan Seely
- Cinematography: Patrick Jones
- Edited by: Mica Tenenbaum; Matthew Lewin
- Music by: Magdalena Bay
- Production company: Another Video
- Release dates: June 4, 2026 (Tribeca Festival); January 27, 2027 (United States)
- Running time: 59 minutes
- Country: United States
- Language: English

Imaginal Disk (sometimes marketed as Magdalena Bay’s Imaginal Disk) is a 2026 American experimental science fiction romantic musical film directed by Amanda Kramer. Starring Mica Tenenbaum and Matthew Lewin, who additionally conceptualized and edited the film and provided its music as Magdalena Bay, the film is a visual companion to their 2024 album of the same name. The film premiered at the Tribeca Festival on June 4, 2026 and will release on DVD on January 27, 2027.

== Cast ==
- Mica Tenenbaum as True / Ghost
- Matthew Lewin
- James Jelin as The Doctor
- Liza Babin as Disk Sales Entity 1
- Megan Seely as Disk Sales Entity 2

== Production ==
On August 23, 2025, the one-year anniversary of the release of the Imaginal Disk album, Magdalena Bay announced that they were in the process of making a feature film as a visual companion to the album. Excerpts from the film in the form of music videos for the album’s tracks “Death & Romance”, “Fear, Sex”, “Image”, and “That’s My Floor” were released in 2024; Kramer is also credited as the director for these works.

In April 2026, it was reported that the film was selected to screen at the Tribeca Festival.

== Release ==
Imaginal Disk premiered at the Tribeca Festival on June 4, 2026, and has since had a small amount of additional screenings at other locations. Director Amanda Kramer has stated that it is planned to eventually release the film via physical media and streaming, but a distributor has yet to be found; a direct-to-consumer DVD release of the film is set to release on January 27, 2027.
