= Tatsumi Romano =

American actress

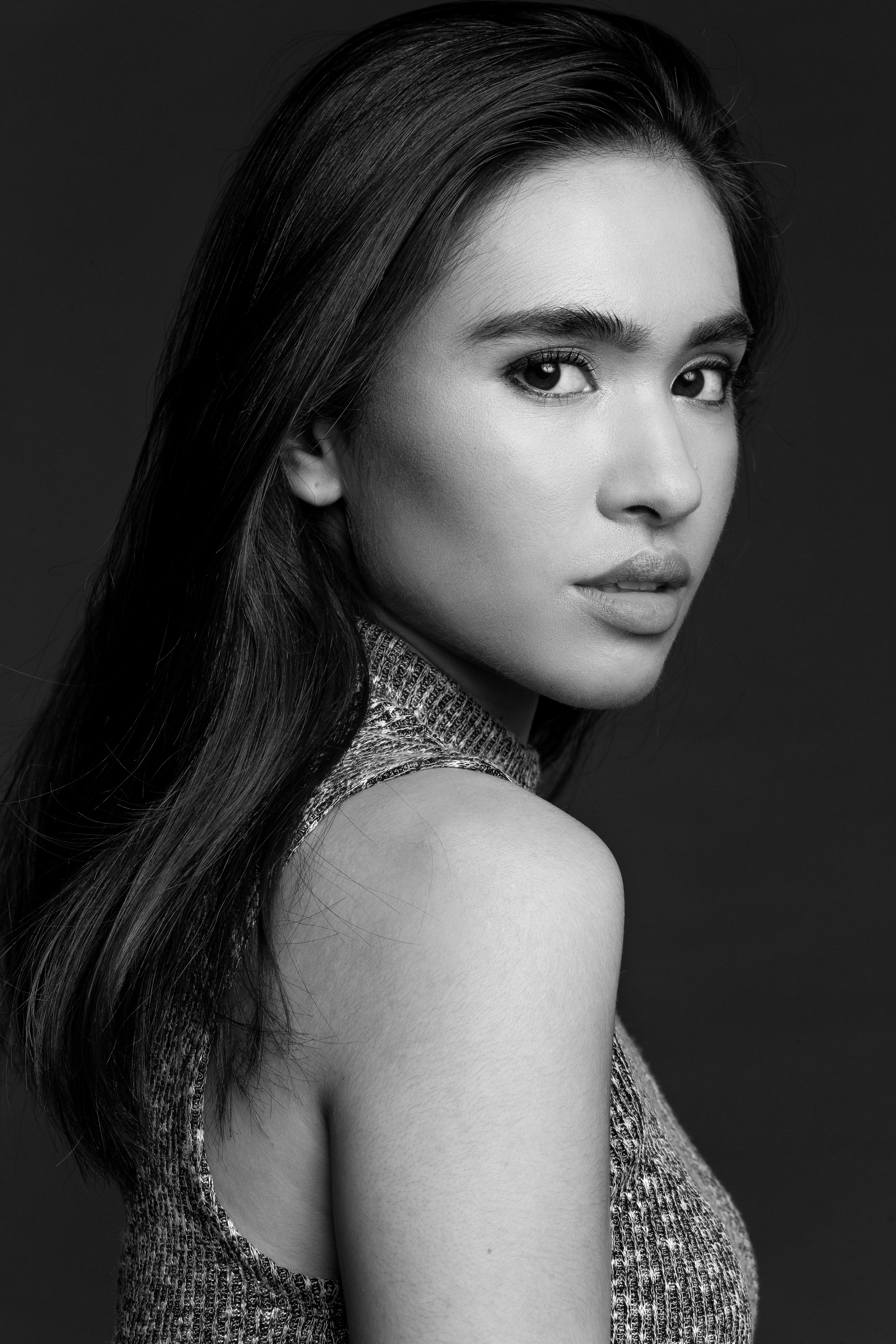
- Born: April 17, 1998 (age 28)
- Occupation: Actress
- Years active: 2010-present

Tatsumi Romano (born April 17, 1998) is an American actress. She is best known for her role as Missy, one of the two protagonists in the series Class of Lies of Snap Originals.

== Career ==
Romano began her career performing voice-over roles in animations, including PBS's WordWorld and various commercials.

In 2018, Romano moved to Los Angeles to pursue full-time acting at 19. She acted in the 2018 thriller-suspense film Ladyworld, directed by Amanda Kramer. The film was selected for the Frontières Platform at the Festival de Cannes in April of that year. Later in 2018, she starred as one of the protagonists in Snapchat's Snap Original, Class of Lies, a series based on two college best friends and roommates who solve cold cases on their crime podcast. The series was the recipient of the Writers Guild of America Awards for Best Short Form New Media and received over 20 million viewers.

In 2021, she appeared in two films: Nineteen on Fire, alongside Euphoria's Alexa Demie, and Year One.

== Filmography ==
Year	Film	Role	Comments
2010	Papa Gorilla Banana	Keiko Yamamoto	Short
2011	Time	Olivia	Short
2013	iSpy		Short
2015	Almost Midnight	Josie Hart	
2016	Her Name Was Hope	Kelly Fine	
2018	Ladyworld	Amanda	
2018	Class of Lies	Missy	TV series, 12 episodes
2021	Nineteen on Fire	Marty	Short
2021	Sk8r Grrl	Dynamic	
TBA	Year One	Breanna	Completed
TBA	A Drifting Man		Post-production
