= Lee Rodriguez =

American actress (born 1999)

- Born: LaRhonza Lee Rodriguez; November 28, 1999 (age 26); Fresno, California, U.S.
- Occupations: Actress; singer
- Years active: 2018–present

LaRhonza Lee Rodriguez (born November 28, 1999) is an American actress and singer. Rodriguez is known for her regular role as Fabiola Torres on the Netflix comedy Never Have I Ever.

== Early life ==
LaRhonza Lee Rodriguez was born on November 28, 1999, in Fresno, California to a Mexican-American father and an African American mother. When she was a child, her family moved to Hesperia, California. When she was in the 8th grade, she started performing roles in the school theatre at Encore Jr./Sr. High School, a school specializing in the arts, helping her develop an interest in acting. She listed herself in a talent agency and later got a role in the year 2018.

== Career ==
Rodriguez's first TV acting role was her portrayal of Bea in the series Class of Lies in 2018. In the same year Rodriguez portrayed Naomi on Grown-ish in 2018. In 2020, Rodriguez joined the cast of Mindy Kaling's Netflix series Never Have I Ever as Fabiola, a gay teenager who is captain of the robotics team at her high school. To prepare for the role, she tried her hand at building a robot that she named "Tinzel Washington".

In 2023, Rodriguez started releasing music under the stage name "La Rhonza".

== Personal life ==
Rodriguez has spoken about colorism and the lack of representation of dark-skinned actresses of colour in the entertainment industry. Rodriguez has future goals of releasing music albums and touring. Rodriguez identifies as queer, first coming out on National Coming Out Day in 2020.

== Filmography ==
Year	Title	Role	Notes
2018	Class of Lies	Bea	Recurring role (season 1)
2018	Grown-ish	Naomi	Episode: "If You're Reading This It's Too Late"
2021	Go Off with Jess & Julissa	Newscaster/Various Characters	2 episodes
2020–2023	Never Have I Ever	Fabiola	Main role (seasons 1–4)
2023	The Good Doctor	Bianca	Episode: "Second Chances and Past Regrets"
