= Class of Lies (American TV series) =

2018 American TV series

- Genre: Teen drama
- Created by: Snap Inc. and NBCUniversal
- Starring: Camille Ramsey; Tatsumi Romano; Lukas Gage; Lee Rodriguez
- Narrated by: Camille Ramsey; Tatsumi Romano
- Country of origin: United States
- Original language: English
- No. of seasons: 1
- No. of episodes: 12

Production
- Executive producer: Mark Boal
- Production location: United States
- Production company: Snap

Original release
- Network: Snapchat
- Release: October 10 – October 21, 2018

Class of Lies is an American teen drama series created for Snapchat as part of Snap Originals which was launched in 2018. Developed as a joint venture between Snapchat and NBCUniversal, the show is executive produced by Mark Boal, who wrote and produced the Oscar-winning film The Hurt Locker and the Oscar-nominated film Zero Dark Thirty.

== Plot ==
Devon (Camille Ramsey) and Missy (Tatsumi Romano) are best friends and college roommates who crack cold cases on their successful true-crime podcast. Their lives quickly turn upside down when their best friend disappears without a trace, leaving the two true-crime podcasters responsible for solving their most important case yet.

== Production ==
The series was written by Riverdale writer Tessa Leigh Williams and won the 2019 Writers Guild of America (WGA) award for Best Original Short Form New Media. The entire series was filmed and edited vertically, as a way of introducing a new method of viewing streaming content. The series is among a list of shows branded as Snap Originals and was the company's introduction to TV-like programming. Additionally, viewers are able to interact with the series through augmented reality features such as Show Portals, which allow viewers to enter Missy and Devon's dorm room and explore the premises.

== Cast and characters ==
- Camille Ramsey as Devon, a 19-year-old college student who hosts a true-crime podcast with her best friend, Missy
- Tatsumi Romano as Missy, a 19-year old college student who hosts a true-crime podcast with her roommate, Devon, and uses her STEM skills to solve complex cases
- Lukas Gage as Tiger, a frat guy
- Lee Rodriguez as Bea, a close friend of Devon and Missy who goes missing after a night out
- Frank Cappello as Anderson, a popular TA who is intimately involved with Devon

== Episodes ==
No.	Title	Original release date
1	"A True Crime Mystery You Need To Watch"	October 10, 2018
2	"How to Find a Missing Person"	October 11, 2018
3	"Next Step: Interrogate the Roommate"	October 12, 2018
4	"Why You Should NEVER Trust the Roommate"	October 13, 2018
5	"Why You Shouldn't Flirt With the Dark Side..."	October 14, 2018
6	"Did Our Heroines Just Become Villains?"	October 15, 2018
7	"Devon's Hot Hookup Might Be the End of Her..."	October 16, 2018
8	"What Happens Next Will Shake You to Your Core"	October 17, 2018
9	"What Really Happened to the Missing Girls?"	October 18, 2018
10	"Find Out What Really Happened to Bea"	October 19, 2018
11	"Name a More Iconic Duo... We'll Wait."	October 20, 2018
12	"This Finale Will Make Your Heart Race"	October 21, 2018
