= Ladyworld =

- Theatrical release poster
- Directed by: Amanda Kramer
- Written by: Amanda Kramer; Benjamin Shearn
- Based on: Lord of the Flies by William Golding
- Produced by: Thomas R. Burke; Jamie Dolan; Leal Naim; Amanda Kramer
- Starring: Ariela Barer; Annalise Basso; Ryan Simpkins; Odessa A'zion; Maya Hawke; Zora Casabere; Tatsumi Romano
- Cinematography: Patrick Meade Jones
- Edited by: Benjamin Shearn; Noel David Taylor
- Music by: Callie Ryan
- Production companies: Love & Death Productions; Pfaff & Pfaff Productions
- Distributed by: Cleopatra Entertainment
- Release date: September 22, 2018 (Fantastic Fest)
- Running time: 93 minutes
- Country: United States
- Language: English

Ladyworld is a 2018 American thriller film directed by Amanda Kramer and starring Ariela Barer, Annalise Basso, Ryan Simpkins, Odessa A'zion, (Note: Then credited as Odessa Adlon.) and Maya Hawke. An all-female take on the 1954 novel Lord of the Flies, Ladyworld follows eight teenage girls trapped in a house together after an earthquake. As food and water run low, their sanity begins to disintegrate and they soon regress to their basic instincts.

== Plot ==
When an earthquake strikes, eight teenage girls get trapped together as food, water, and sanity begin to disintegrate enough for the girls to resort to using their basic instincts.

== Cast ==
- Ariela Barer as Olivia
- Annalise Basso as Piper
- Ryan Simpkins as Dolly
- Odessa Adlon as Blake
- Maya Hawke as Romy
- Zora Casabere as Mallory
- Tatsumi Romano as Amanda
- Atheena Frizzell as Eden
- Noel David Taylor as The Man

== Production ==
Principal photography began in January 2018 in Los Angeles, California.

== Release ==
The film had its world premiere at Fantastic Fest in Austin, Texas on September 22, 2018. The film also screened at BFI London Film Festival and Toronto International Film Festival. After, Cleopatra Entertainment acquired North American rights to the film and set a theatrical release for August 2, 2019.

== Reception ==
On Rotten Tomatoes, the film holds an approval rating of 52% based on 21 reviews, with an average rating of 5.3/10. On Metacritic, the film has a weighted average score of 54 out of 100, based on 6 critics, indicating "mixed or average" reviews.
