= Death & Romance =

2024 single by Magdalena Bay

Single by Magdalena Bay

from the album Imaginal Disk
- Released: May 28, 2024
- Genre: Synth-pop; psychedelic pop; neo-psychedelia; electronic pop
- Length: 5:14
- Label: Mom + Pop
- Songwriters: Matthew Lewin; Mica Tenenbaum
- Producer: Magdalena Bay

Magdalena Bay singles chronology
"Unconditional" (2022)	"Death & Romance" (2024)	"Image" (2024)

Music video
- "Death & Romance" on YouTube

"Death & Romance" is a song by the American duo Magdalena Bay from their second studio album, Imaginal Disk (2024). It was released through Mom + Pop Music on May 28, 2024, as the album's lead single. Both members of the duo—Matthew Lewin and Mica Tenenbaum—wrote and produced the song, while the mixing was handled by Dave Fridmann and was mastered by Emily Lazar. Written in a two-week period, "Death & Romance" is a psychedelic pop, neo-psychedelia, and synth-pop track led by piano and drums. The fictional lyrics represent a woman who was left by her alien boyfriend.

Upon its release, "Death & Romance" was met with positive reception from music critics; some of them called it a standout on Imaginal Disk. The magazine Paste ranked it as the best song of 2024, while other publications included it in lower positions of their year-end lists. A music video for the song premiered on June 18, 2024; it was directed by Amanda Kramer and follows the story of True, a character portrayed by Tenenbaum. Magdalena Bay performed "Death & Romance" as part of the regular set list in The Imaginal Mystery Tour (2024).

== Background and release ==
In 2021, the American duo Magdalena Bay—consisted of Mica Tenenbaum and Matthew Lewin—released their debut album, Mercurial World, to critical acclaim. While promoting the album with a concert tour, they started working on new music; one of the first songs written was "Death & Romance". The duo wrote it when they had time to be at home, during a two-week period of "creative spark". In parallel, they released Mini Mix, Vol. 3, an extended play (EP) containing seven short songs, accompanied by a full-length music video. Months after, they signed to New York City-based record label Mom + Pop Music. In a statement, they expressed their excitement for "what the future holds", and announced that "the next stage, the next phase is here". In the following year, Magdalena Bay started teasing the arrival of new music on social media for several weeks.

"Death & Romance" was released through Mom + Pop Music on May 28, 2024. Alongside the release of the song, Magdalena Bay also announced a concert tour titled The Imaginal Mystery Tour, and revealed the first dates throughout North America and Europe on September, October, and November 2024. In a statement, the duo presented the song: "Imagine rain pouring, streetlights glowing. You sit at home and wait for your alien boyfriend to pick you up in his UFO...but this time, he's not coming." On July 11, with the release of the single "Image", Magdalena Bay announced the album Imaginal Disk and its track listing, in which "Death & Romance" appears as the fifth track. They stated that it is attached to "Fear, Sex", the sixth track, being "two parts of the same song".

== Composition ==
"Death & Romance" is 5 minutes and 14 seconds long. Both members of Magdalena Bay wrote and produced the track, which was mixed by Dave Fridmann and mastered by Emily Lazar. Musically, critics have categorized "Death & Romance" as a psychedelic pop, neo-psychedelia, and synth-pop track. They also viewed elements of psych-rock. It is led by piano and drums, while also containing "twinkly" synthesizers and "groovy" bass. With "Death & Romance", Magdalena Bay moved into "longer, melodramatic" tracks, marking a departure from more traditional structures. According to Liam Hess of Vogue, the song's keyboards and thundering drums are similar to the works of the Swedish group ABBA. The intro was compared by Exclaim!'s Kaelen Bell to the 1999 single "Steal My Sunshine" by the Canadian duo Len. The lyrics are sung by Tenenbaum from a perspective of a woman who was left by her alien boyfriend, as she sends a signal to him to a red star from far away.

== Critical reception ==
Upon its release, "Death & Romance" received positive reviews from music critics, with some of them describing it as a standout on Imaginal Disk. Bell said that the song "sounds absolutely massive". Paolo Ragusa of Consequence praised Tenenbaum's voice for being "drenched in atmosphere, lending a hypnotic and hazy air to the song". Paper's Tobias Hess envisioned "Death & Romance" playing in a stadium. He praised its lyrics and instrumentation as having "vibrancy of a forever-classic". Writing a review of the album for Paste, Eric Bennett stated that "each icy piano stab makes the scope feel bigger and more all-consuming". Dan Condon of ABC News believed that "Death & Romance" is "what Tame Impala producing Dua Lipa should've sounded like".

"Death & Romance" was placed in several mid-year and year-end lists of the best songs of 2024. While including it on its list of the Best Songs of 2024 So Far in July, magazine Dork described it as "pure sonic serotonin" and "the soundtrack to the best night out you've never had, complete with streetlights that glow just a little too brightly and rain that falls upwards". "Death & Romance" was named the best song of 2024 by Paste; the magazine's critic Clare Martin praised Tenenbaum's crystalline vocals and delivery, as well as the tension in the instrumentation. It was added to the lists by Dork, Stereogum, and Pitchfork at numbers 16, 32, and 45, respectively. The song was not included in the Vulture top 10 songs of the year but was named by the website as one of the "other highlights".

== Music video ==
Amanda Kramer directed the sci-fi-themed music video for "Death & Romance", which premiered on June 18, 2024. It is around three minutes longer than the song, and features UFOs, portals, and doppelgängers. The video stars Tenenbaum in the role of a character named True, who lays in an aquamarine bedroom and in a "bucolic scenery". She meets a being of light, Lewin, and the two kiss. It is revealed that they are being monitored by aliens who try to abduct the being of light before he escapes and leaves True. She is then "updated" with what the album is named after, an "Imaginal Disk". The outro of the video was later revealed to be "Fear, Sex". In a press release, Magdalena Bay said that the song "feels complete" with the video and expressed their enthusiasm for sharing "the rest of the story with you". The writer Travis Shosa of The Line of Best Fit said that the video is "bizarre", but was not surprised considering the duo's previous "absurd" aesthetics.

== Live performances ==
Magdalena Bay performed "Death & Romance" live during The Imaginal Mystery Tour in 2024. The duo played Imaginal Disk in full and in order, interspersing it with other songs from their discography, including "Secrets (Your Fire)" and "You Lose!". Dork's Abigail Firth said that it was one of the "big moments" of the tour, with a rock opera feeling.
