= Image (song) =

2024 single by Magdalena Bay

Single by Magdalena Bay

from the album Imaginal Disk
- Released: July 10, 2024
- Genre: Synth-pop; disco; pop
- Length: 3:32
- Label: Mom + Pop
- Songwriters: Matthew Lewin; Mica Tenenbaum
- Producer: Magdalena Bay

Magdalena Bay singles chronology
"Death & Romance" (2024)	"Image" (2024)	"Tunnel Vision" (2024)

Grimes singles chronology
"Nothing Lasts Forever" (2023)	"Image" (Grimes Special) (2024)	"Artificial Angels" (2025)

Music video
- "Image" on YouTube

"Image" is a song by the American musical duo Magdalena Bay from their second studio album, Imaginal Disk (2024). It was released through Mom + Pop Music on July 10, 2024, as the album's second single. Both members of the duo—Matthew Lewin and Mica Tenenbaum—wrote and produced the song. Musically, it is a synth-pop, disco, and pop track led by bassline, drums, and synthesizers that build up to the last chorus. The song's lyrics are about self-reinvention.

Music critics received "Image" positively, some of whom praised its sound and named it one of the best songs from 2024. One critic noted similarities between Tenenbaum's vocal affectations and those from the Canadian musician Grimes, who was cited by the duo as an inspiration for their early work. A remix version of the song with Grimes was released on October 29, 2024.

Amanda Kramer directed the music video for "Image", which premiered alongside the song. Inspired by Peter Gabriel, it includes vaporwave aesthetics and stars Tenenbaum portraying the fictional character True. Magdalena Bay included "Image" on the regular set list of the Imaginal Mystery Tour (2024–2025). To promote the song, they also performed it at their late-night television debut on Jimmy Kimmel Live! and on Triple J's Like a Version series.

== Background and release ==
After being signed to the record label Mom + Pop Music, the American duo Magdalena Bay released the single "Death & Romance" on May 28, 2024. Subsequently, they announced a concert tour, the Imaginal Mystery Tour. On July 10, the duo released "Image" and announced their second album, Imaginal Disk. They also revealed its track listing, in which "Image" appears as the fourth track. In a statement regarding the song, the duo shared: "Close your eyes. Imagine a brand new, better you. Now wait 22 minutes. Now open your eyes. Meet your brand new image! Isn't it amazing that the meat in our heads can do this?". On October 29, 2024, they shared a remix version with the Canadian musician Grimes, who inspired the beginnings of the duo members' musical career. They expressed their excitement after the release of the remix, describing it as "a big deal".

== Composition ==
"Image" is 3 minutes and 32 seconds long. Both members of Magdalena Bay—Mica Tenenbaum and Matthew Lewin—wrote and produced the track. It was mixed by Dave Fridmann and mastered by Emily Lazar. Musically, it is a disco, synth-pop, and pop track. The 1980s-inspired production is "lush and glimmering", according to Rome Saenz of Billboard Philippines. It contains a bassline, 4/4 kick drum, and "sparkling" synthesizers that builds up as the song progresses. The lyrics center on self-reinvention. The first chorus mentions "22 more minutes", while the second says "21 more minutes", initiating a countdown; after that period of time in Imaginal Disk, a breakdown in the song "Tunnel Vision" is presented, which leads into the album's second act.

For Stereogum, Abby Jones described the track as both futuristic and nostalgic, beginning "as a mellower, vaporwave-meets-pop diva jam, until a delightfully blown-out bass crashes into the final chorus". The affectations of Tenenbaum's haunting vocals were compared by Paste's Eric Bennett to those from Grimes. The remix with Grimes starts with a pitched-up voice saying: "The seats are empty. The theater is dark. So, why do you keep dancing?" On the remix, the original tempo is slowed down, and "heavier" synthesizers appear.

== Critical reception ==
Writing for The Line of Best Fit, Matthew Kim opined that, as in other songs on Imaginal Disk, the instrumentals match the lyricism vibe, praising the "crunchiness" of the final chorus of the track. Evan Sawdey for Spin said that the song "showed the group still could make spacey bangers if they wanted to". Flood Magazine's Will Schube stated that it sounds "like [it] emanated from an alien spaceship", and that the bass and snare slaps "give the chorus a biting edge". Vogue's Liam Hess described "Image" as a catchy "pop perfection" hard to find on other album released in 2024.

"Image" was added to publications' listicles of best music. Under the Radar named "Image" the best song of its release week. Billboard added it to a list of the 20 Pop Songs From 2024 That Deserved to Be Smashes. In rankings of the best songs published in 2024, "Image" was placed at number 4 by Slant Magazine and number 25 by Consequence, with the latter's critic Paolo Ragusa believing that it contains "some of [the duo's] slickest instrumentals and satisfying melodies". "Image" was also added to an unranked year-end list by Billboard Philippines.

== Music video ==
Amanda Kramer directed the music video for "Image", released alongside the single. It follows the video for "Death & Romance", which found True, a character played by Tenenbaum, getting an "imaginal disk" upgrade inserted into her forehead. The video for "Image" goes "back in time" to a waiting room before the appointment. It features a star-shaped monster, as well as a fictional home shopping network. When her time comes, the video contains mid-90s computer graphics and the monster chases her. After the sequence, it gets her into a operating chair and starts "looming over her with a comically large pair of scissors". Lewin mentioned the English musician Peter Gabriel as a reference for the video, specifically naming the visuals of "Steam" (1993) and "Sledgehammer" (1986). Jonah Krueger of Consequence described it as "intensely danceable" and perceived vaporwave aesthetics.

== Live performances ==
Magdalena Bay included "Image" on the regular set list of the Imaginal Mystery Tour in 2024. The duo played Imaginal Disk in full and in order, interspersing it with other songs from their discography, including "Secrets (Your Fire)", "Chaeri", and "You Lose!" from their previous album, Mercurial World (2021). On October 30, 2024, the duo made their late-night television debut with a performance of "Image" on Jimmy Kimmel Live!. According to Konstantinos Pappis from Our Culture Mag, they transferred the "mystical imagery" from the music video to the stage; Tenenbaum wore the same outfit and sang in front of a mirror-like video screen from their live concerts. On March 28, 2025, Magdalena Bay performed "Image" on Triple J's Like a Version series, alongside a cover of "Ashes to Ashes" (1980) by David Bowie.
