= Imaginal Disk =

2024 studio album by Magdalena Bay

Studio album by Magdalena Bay
- Released: August 23, 2024
- Studios: Mag Bay HQ; Honeymoon Suite (Los Angeles) (Note: Drums on tracks 2, 5, 12, and 13); IMRSV (Stockholm) (Note: Orchestra)
- Genres: Synth-pop; dance-pop; electronic rock
- Length: 53:42
- Label: Mom + Pop
- Producers: Mica Tenenbaum; Matthew Lewin

Magdalena Bay chronology
Mini Mix, Vol. 3 (2023)	Imaginal Disk (2024)

Singles from Imaginal Disk
- 1. "Death & Romance" Released: May 28, 2024; 2. "Image" Released: July 10, 2024; 3. "Tunnel Vision" Released: July 31, 2024; 4. "That's My Floor" Released: August 21, 2024

Imaginal Disk is the second studio album by the American musical duo Magdalena Bay, released through Mom + Pop Music on August 23, 2024. Both members of the duo, Mica Tenenbaum and Matthew Lewin, wrote and produced the album, while Tenenbaum provided the lead vocals. It is a concept album centered on the fictional character True. After a compact disc-shaped object, the titular Imaginal Disk, is implanted into her forehead in order to create her ideal self, her body rejects it and she relearns the meaning of being human. Recurring lyrical themes include self-exploration and consciousness.

Musically, Imaginal Disk is a synth-pop, dance-pop, and electronic rock album. It was supported by four singles—"Death & Romance", "Image", "Tunnel Vision", and "That's My Floor"—released between May and August 2024. The album is accompanied by a musical film of the same name directed by Amanda Kramer, which premiered at Tribeca Festival in June 2026. The album's music videos are pulled from the film, which follows the narrative of the album with Tenenbaum portraying True. Magdalena Bay further promoted Imaginal Disk with a concert tour, the "Imaginal Mystery Tour", which commenced in September 2024 and concluded in August 2026.

Upon its release, the album received acclaim from music critics. Most reviewers praised its style and considered it an improvement from their debut album, Mercurial World (2021). It appeared on several year-end listicles of the best music, as well as on a mid-decade ranking by Paste. The same magazine also named "Death & Romance" the best song released in 2024. Commercially, Imaginal Disk reached the top 40 in Australia and appeared on secondary charts in the United Kingdom and the United States.

== Background ==
In 2021, the American duo Magdalena Bay—consisting of Mica Tenenbaum and Matthew Lewin—released their debut album, Mercurial World, to critical acclaim. In the following year, they shared its deluxe edition, which contained alternative versions of album tracks and new songs. It was released through Luminelle Recordings. While promoting the album with a concert tour, they started working on new music. In parallel, they worked with Jihyo and Lil Yachty, and released Mini Mix, Vol. 3, an extended play (EP) with seven short songs accompanied by a full-length music video. In June 2023, the duo signed to the New York City-based record label Mom + Pop Music. In a statement, they expressed their excitement for "what the future holds", and announced that "the next stage, the next phase is here". (Note: The latter phrase is featured verbatim in the Imaginal Disk track "True Blue Interlude.") Following a series of social media posts teasing the arrival of new music in 2024, Magdalena Bay announced their second album, Imaginal Disk.

== Writing and recording ==
Magdalena Bay began writing and working on Imaginal Disk in 2022. While in the process of the album's creation, they wanted to do something different from Mercurial World, which contained songs with a classical pop structure; they decided to "play with that a little bit". Several demos were discarded because the duo felt that they were too serious, although believing that they "sounded good". Tenenbaum said that she was in "[her] first Beatles phase and then Paul McCartney phase" while writing Imaginal Disk. She and Lewin were also listening to Pink Floyd's discography, as well as albums by Fiona Apple, Radiohead, and St. Vincent. Several other artists and albums were mentioned as inspirations for Imaginal Disk, including the songwriting of the American musician Fiona Apple, the 2000 soundtrack Selmasongs by the Icelandic musician Björk, and the music of the English band Electric Light Orchestra. According to the liner notes of Imaginal Disk, it was mostly recorded in their home studio, which is referred to as "Mag Bay HQ". Additional drum and orchestral parts were respectively recorded at Honeymoon Suite in Los Angeles and IMRSV Studios in Stockholm.

== Composition ==
=== Music and concept ===
Musically, Imaginal Disk has been described by critics as a predominantly synth-pop, dance-pop, and electronic rock album. It also contains elements of pop music, psychedelia, new age, disco, shoegaze, and progressive rock. The production has been called maximalist. Pitchfork's Anna Gaca said that it departs from the optimistic sound of pop in order to adjust to a "cynical and paranoid reality".

Described by the duo and some reviewers as a "loose concept album", the lyrics of Imaginal Disk establish a narrative revolving around True, a character represented by Tenenbaum in the album's music videos. True is implanted with an "Imaginal Disk", an object shaped like a compact disc, into her forehead to transform into her ideal self. When True's body rejects the Disk, she undertakes a journey to understand "what it means to be human", as stated by the duo. The duo stated that the narrative for the album was developed after the writing of the music, with the narrative provided as a "layer of meaning on top of the record" and enmeshed in the visual design of the album and videos. Tenenbaum and Lewin developed the cover artwork with Maria Shatalova; it depicts a demon hand inserting a CD into Tenenbaum's forehead from above.

Imaginal Disk shares its name with imaginal discs, structures within the bodies of insect larvae that emerge to form parts of their adult bodies. The title was inspired by Tenenbaum's reading into metamorphosis and her interest in the relationship between these genetic processes and "ideas of self" as they applied to human nature. Lewin stated the album title acted as a "double entendre" to connect the album cover's concept of "inserting a disk into someone's forehead" with the themes of "consciousness, memory, [and] awareness". Self-exploration is also a recurring theme, along with identity and technology. The duo members have different perspectives regarding the romantic nature of the album: Tenenbaum opined that it is less romantic than Mercurial World, while Lewin disagreed, considering "the historical sense of the word", and believing that it is more melodramatic and dark.

=== Songs ===
The album opens with "She Looked like Me!", built on a dance rhythm with distorted samples, synthesizers, and percussion. It is followed by "Killing Time", a yacht rock song beginning similarly to lounge music before reaching a climax with a guitar solo, psychedelic guitar lines, and spoken word chants. It blends both pop and progressive elements. "True Blue Interlude" is a dreamy interlude that has a similar vibe to infomercials. It is followed by "Image", a disco and pop song with lyrical content that focuses on self-identity and reflection, with lines of rebirth: "Meet your brand new image." The choruses of "Image" initiate a countdown to "22" and "21 more minutes". The fifth song, "Death & Romance", is predominantly led by piano chords, while also containing synthesizers and drums. Evan Sawdey of Spin defined it one of the duo's "longer, melodramatic" tracks, marking a departure from more traditional structures. On "Fear, Sex", Tenenbaum criticizes the idea of a computer-enhanced human: "Shoulda known those dirty bastards/Would put wires in your head". The dream pop track "Vampire in the Corner" contains the duo's favorite lyrics on the album. The song is about loving a person even when it hurts to do so, as she sings: "Someone call the coroner/'Cause you're breaking my heart/My god, I think I mighta loved you too much." "Watching T.V.", the eighth song, was compared by Paste's Andy Steiner to the "Kid A chill". On the five-minute album centerpiece "Tunnel Vision", the duo explores themes of artificial intelligence and self-hatred. Its production builds up as it progresses, incorporating a synth rock sound with a bassline and live drums. On the track, the countdown initiated on "Image" ends; at that moment, a breakdown is presented, which leads to the second act to the album.

The tenth track, "Love Is Everywhere", has a disco production marked by the use of a theremin. The song's psychedelic instrumental is a reworked version of the duo's contribution to "Running Out of Time" by Lil Yachty. Gaca compared the interlude "Feeling DiskInserted?" to "YA sci-fi paperbacks". The progressive rock and psychedelic synth funk "That's My Floor" also contains a guitar solo at the end. Its lyrics have a sense of discovery: "Never really noticed I'm the transcendental type". Magdalena Bay said that it is about "how [they] imagine a party must be like. [They have] never been to one". While working on the disco-pop track "Cry for Me", the duo was "obsessed" with "Dancing Queen" (1976) by the Swedish group ABBA. They wanted to capture the feeling of "Dancing Queen" into the song, although "Cry for Me" is more "moody and dramatic", according to Lewin. Tenenbaum revealed that the lyrics are written from a perspective of a character, whether a hero or a villain, who wants "to be washed free of their sins and reborn as a pure being". While reviewing the album, AllMusic's Matt Collar described "Angel on a Satellite" as a "relaxing" ballad with baroque pop and nature sounds, also led by an acoustic piano. Imaginal Disk's last song, "The Ballad of Matt & Mica", is a self-referential track that reprises a melody from "She Looked like Me!". It closes the album with a happy ending, and was interpreted by Gaca as an allusion to Tenenbaum's real life and how she arrived with Lewin to Los Angeles.

== Release and promotion ==
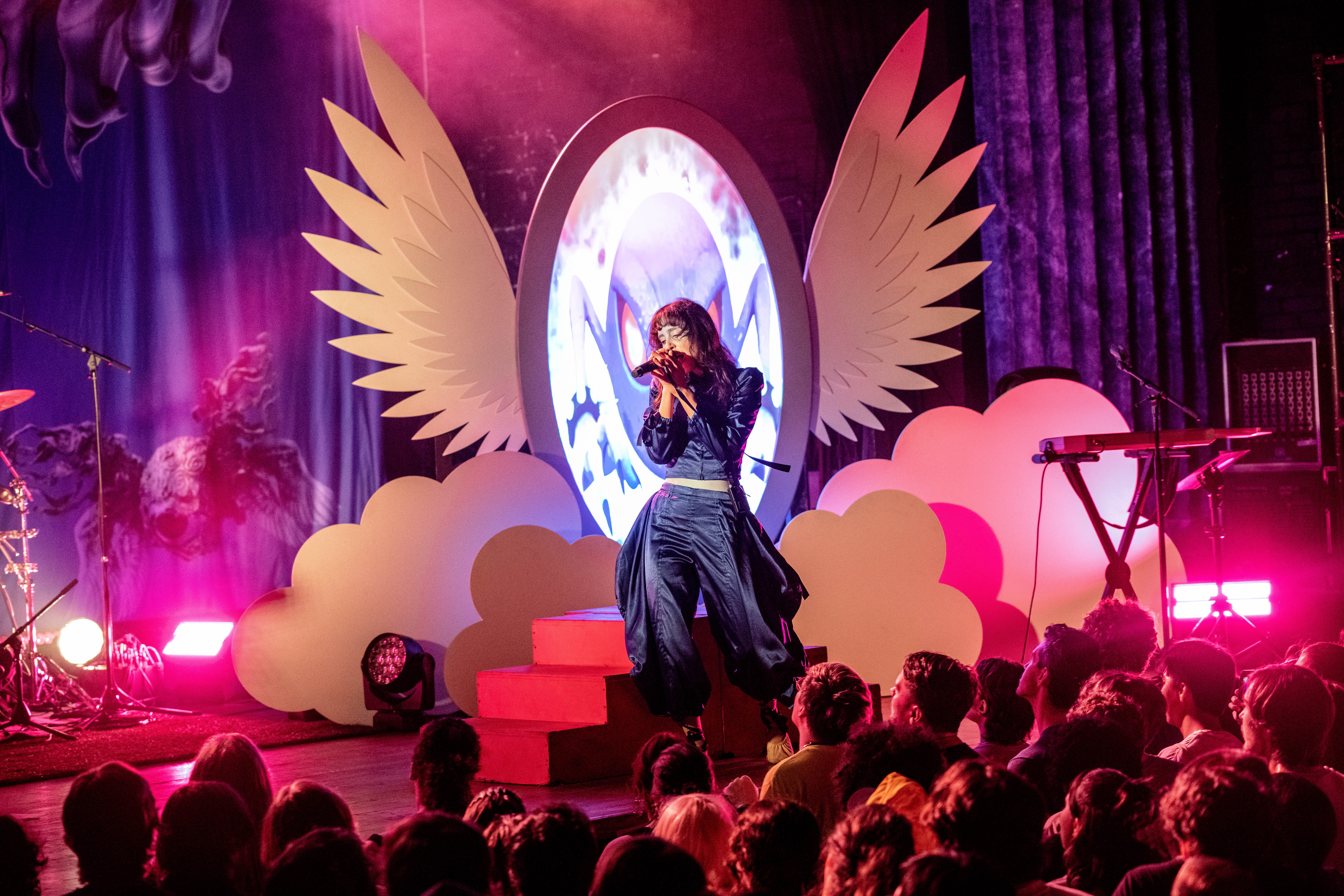
Magdalena Bay performing at the Imaginal Mystery Tour in September 2024.

The lead single from Imaginal Disk, "Death & Romance", marked the duo's first release with Mom + Pop Music, on May 28, 2024. On June 18, the release was supported by a sci-fi-themed music video directed by Amanda Kramer, extended to contain the song "Fear, Sex". The announcement of Imaginal Disk on July 10 was accompanied by the reveal of its track listing and the release of the second single "Image", with a video also directed by Kramer. It was followed by a third single, "Tunnel Vision", on July 31. "That's My Floor", the fourth and final single, was released on August 21, two days before the album's release; it was also supported by a music video. All the videos follow the narrative of the album, depicting True being chased by a monster, left by a being of light, and implanted with the "Imaginal Disk". They contain Y2K and vaporwave aesthetics, and were influenced by the music videos of Peter Gabriel, the films Flash Gordon (1980) and House (1977), and the artistry of Shana Moulton.

Imaginal Disk was released on August 23, 2024, through CD, vinyl LP, and digital formats. It reached secondary charts in the United Kingdom and the United States; it peaked at number 33 on the UK Album Downloads Chart, while reaching numbers 6 and 17 on the Billboard Heatseekers Albums and Top Current Album Sales charts, respectively. In 2025, it entered the Australian Albums chart at number 38. On October 30, 2024, Magdalena Bay made their late-night television debut with a performance of "Image" on Jimmy Kimmel Live!.

Magdalena Bay further promoted the album with the Imaginal Mystery Tour, a concert tour across North America, Europe, and Australia. The tour began in September 2024, with additional performances at multiple music festivals, such as Lollapalooza in Chicago and Primavera Sound in Barcelona. Sam Austins served as the opening act in several shows in the United States. During the tour, the duo played Imaginal Disk in full and in order, interspersed with other songs from their discography, including some from Mercurial World. The tour is set to conclude in February 2026. It received mostly positive reviews from The Guardian's Hannah Ewens and The Line of Best Fit's Adam England.

== Critical reception ==
Professional ratings
Aggregate scores
Source	Rating
AnyDecentMusic?	7.9/10
Metacritic	85/100
Review scores
Source	Rating
AllMusic	4/5 stars
The Line of Best Fit	9/10
NME	5/5 stars
Paste	8.2/10
Pitchfork	7.7/10
Slant Magazine	4/5 stars
Sputnikmusic	3/5
Under the Radar	9/10 stars

Imaginal Disk received critical acclaim, according to Metacritic. In the review aggregator site, which assigns a normalized rating from publications, the album received a weighted average score of 85 out of 100 based on 8 reviews. AnyDecentMusic? compiled 10 reviews and assigned the album a score of 7.9 out of 10.

Some reviewers compared Imaginal Disk with Magdalena Bay's previous projects. In a review for PopMatters, Sawdey perceived it as an improvement from Mercurial World, being "more colorful, more ambitious, and far weirder". Writing for Paste, Eric Bennett agreed with the latter descriptor, and called it more surprising. NME's Otis Robinson opined that the album "further consolidate[d]" Tenenbaum and Lewin's previously presented lore. Writing for Under the Radar, Caleb Campbell said that the duo "explor[ed] new textures and emotional range".

The style of Imaginal Disk was praised. Slant Magazine's Nick Seip wrote that the "lengthy and ambitious" Imaginal Disk finds them "at their most radical", and lauded it for "in fact heading somewhere". AllMusic's Matt Collar praised the vibe for being "absolutely distinctive" and compared it to the conceptual pop of Charli XCX and Caroline Polachek. Matthew Kim of The Line of Best Fit also described it as "unique" and said that the album "is a testament to good old-fashioned artistry".

Critics also commented on the album's narrative. Kim believed that the concept "isn't strictly important to the album", and it is "more like just a collection of pop songs centered around a common theme". He also stated that the album is not homogeneous, but "manages" to feel cohesive. Steiner opined that the duo "push[es] themselves out of their comfort zone". Gaca said that the "dense" concept generally works, but not in all the songs. In a less positive review, Sputnikmusic commended the album's "craft and attention to detail", but considered it to lack depth due to its "over-stimulated [and] disoriented" premise and cursory treatment of its themes.

=== Rankings ===
Several publications included Imaginal Disk in year-end listicles of the best albums released in 2024, including top-10 positions from NME, Stereogum, Slant Magazine, and Our Culture Mag. It also appeared in an unranked listicle published by Uproxx. In October 2024, Paste included Imaginal Disk on a mid-decade ranking of best albums. The same magazine named the single "Death & Romance" the best song of its release year. Other tracks that were present on year-end listicles include "She Looked like Me!", "Image", "That's My Floor", and "Cry for Me".

Select year-end rankings for Imaginal Disk
Publication/critic	Accolade	Rank	Ref.
Consequence	The 50 Best Albums of 2024	29	
Exclaim!	50 Best Albums of 2024	15	
The Forty-Five	The Best Albums of 2024	23	
NME	The 50 best albums of 2024	5	
Our Culture Mag	The 50 Best Albums of 2024	8	
Paste	The 100 Best Albums of 2024	26	
Pitchfork	The 50 Best Albums of 2024	19	
PopMatters	The 80 Best Albums of 2024	42	
Slant Magazine	The 50 Best Albums of 2024	10	
Stereogum	The 50 Best Albums of 2024	5	

Mid-decade ranking for Imaginal Disk
Publication	List	Rank	Ref.
Paste	The 100 Best Albums of the 2020s So Far (2024)	76	

== Track listing ==
All tracks are written by Mica Tenenbaum and Matthew Lewin.

Imaginal Disk track listing
No.	Title	Length
1.	"She Looked Like Me!"	3:13
2.	"Killing Time"	3:53
3.	"True Blue Interlude"	1:49
4.	"Image"	3:32
5.	"Death & Romance"	5:14
6.	"Fear, Sex"	2:32
7.	"Vampire in the Corner"	3:22
8.	"Watching T.V."	4:05
9.	"Tunnel Vision"	5:05
10.	"Love Is Everywhere"	3:14
11.	"Feeling DiskInserted?"	0:58
12.	"That's My Floor"	3:42
13.	"Cry for Me"	5:07
14.	"Angel on a Satellite"	4:03
15.	"The Ballad of Matt & Mica"	4:00
Total length:		53:36

== Personnel ==
The personnel is adapted from the liner notes.

Magdalena Bay

- Mica Tenenbaum – production, vocals
- Matthew Lewin – production, string arrangements, brass arrangements, backing vocals

Additional musicians

- Nick Villa – drums
- Erik Arvinder – orchestra conductor
- Anna Roos Stefansson – violin
- Brusk Zanganeh – violin
- Daniel Migdal – violin
- Daniela Bonfiglioli – violin
- Fredrik Syberg – violin
- Martin Stensson – violin
- Oscar Treitler – violin
- Sofie Sunnerstam – violin
- Tove Lund – violin
- Veronika Novotna – violin
- Vicky Sayles – violin
- Erik Holm – viola
- Mathilda Brunstrøm – viola
- Riikka Repo – viola
- Vidar Andersson – viola
- Daniel Thorell – cello
- Filip Lundberg – cello
- Pelle Hansen – cello
- Walter McTigert – double bass
- Martin Lood – trumpet
- Johan Wahlgren – French horn
- Chris Parkes – French horn
- Håkan Björkman – trombone
- Mikael Oskarsson – trombone
- Jon Fridmann – additional trumpet (track 1)

Technical

- Justin Raisen – additional production (track 10)
- Emily Lazar – mastering
- Dave Fridmann – mixing
- Willem Bleeker – orchestra engineering
- Erik Arvinder – orchestra engineering
- Pat Jones – drum engineering (tracks 2, 5, 12, 13)
- Jon Fridmann – mixing assistance
- Oliver Hill – string arrangements, brass arrangements

Visuals

- Maria Shatalova – exterior art
- Zhe Con – interior art
- Remi Volcair – layout design

== Charts ==
Chart performance for Imaginal Disk
Chart (2024–2025)	Peak position
Australian Albums (ARIA)	38
Scottish Albums (Official Charts)	27
UK Album Downloads (Official Charts)	33
US Heatseekers Albums (Billboard)	6
US Top Current Album Sales (Billboard)	17

== Film ==
On August 23, 2025, the one-year anniversary of Imaginal Disk, Magdalena Bay announced that they were in the process of making a “full album movie” as a visual companion to the album. Directed by Amanda Kramer, the film premiered at the Tribeca Festival on June 4, 2026 and has since had a few additional screenings. It is currently unknown when the film will be publicly released, but Kramer stated at a screening of the film that it is planned to be eventually released via physical media and streaming.
