= Please Baby Please =

2022 film by Amanda Kramer

- Theatrical release poster
- Directed by: Amanda Kramer
- Written by: Amanda Kramer; Noel David Taylor
- Produced by: Rob Paris; Gül Karakiz; David Silver; Mike Witherill
- Starring: Andrea Riseborough; Harry Melling; Karl Glusman; Demi Moore
- Cinematography: Patrick Meade Jones
- Edited by: Benjamin Shearn
- Music by: Giulio Carmassi; Bryan Scary
- Production companies: Rivulet Media; Paris Film Inc.
- Distributed by: Music Box Films
- Release dates: January 26, 2022 (IFFR); October 28, 2022 (United States)
- Running time: 95 minutes
- Country: United States
- Language: English
- Box office: $26,157

Please Baby Please is a 2022 American musical drama film directed by Amanda Kramer, who co-wrote the screenplay with Noel David Taylor. It stars Andrea Riseborough, Harry Melling, Karl Glusman, and Demi Moore.

The film had its world premiere at the International Film Festival Rotterdam on January 26, 2022. It was released to positive reviews in the United States on October 28, 2022, by Music Box Films.

== Plot ==
On the Lower East Side of Manhattan, a gang called the Young Gents stop in front of an apartment building and beat a couple to death. Another couple, Arthur and Suze, watch in shock. The gang interrogates them about where they live, while Arthur and leader Teddy stare at each other, entranced. Suze tells them which apartment they live in.

Later, Suze and Arthur host their friends Ida, Baker, and Les in their apartment. Suze recounts their encounter while Arthur is mocked by Baker and Les for his refusal to "be a man." A conversation ensues, where Suze reveals a desire to "be Stanley Kowalski" and expresses delight at the violence caused by the Young Gents, before Arthur loudly proclaims his anxieties about manhood and how he feels judged equally by men and women.

Once alone, Suze begins dancing, coaxing Arthur to join. They dance until Suze grabs a bottle, holding it between her legs like a penis. Arthur takes the bottle and Suze prostrates at Arthur's feet, begging to let her worship him. As Arthur takes the trash out he finds a blood-stained matchbook from The Blue Angel Club, and walks towards the bar.

Suze hears a neighbor calling for help. Maureen hands Suze grocery bags and they walk up to her apartment. Maureen expresses disgust for the appliances her husband buys for her. Suze tells Maureen about the incident with the gang and Maureen waxes poetic to Suze about the nature of men. Their conversation is interrupted by Billy, who has arrived to take Maureen out, calling up from the streets. Maureen gives her keys to Suze to watch the apartment while she's away in Europe.

At the club, Arthur stares at Teddy as the Young Gents mess around. Arthur watches Teddy and the bartender flirt with each other, before following them into the bathroom. Arthur awkwardly washes his hands until Teddy ushers for the bartender, who he was embracing, to leave. Teddy tells Arthur that he remembers him and begins flirting with him. Arthur confronts Teddy about the murder, who reveals that the Young Gents are preparing for a big fight. Arthur implores him not to. Teddy smiles and grabs Arthur's chin gently; they imply that they'll see each other again.

Suze fantasizes about dancing in Maureen's apartment while the Young Gents writhe around her in underwear and leather. Back to reality, Suze watches Les recite poetry as Baker accompanies him on the drum in a room filled with beatniks, as well as Dickie and Joanne, who he met at the bar. Dickie is moved by the poetry while Joanne laughs at it, causing Les to ask them to leave. An argument breaks out, and Dickie almost lashes out as Joanne.

Suze and Ida walk down the streets after having left the party and Suze expresses a desire to be considered "imposing." Ida muses about the nature of womanhood, marriage, and female friendship while Suze describes what she'd do if she was a man. They stop in front of a phone booth that is occupied by Billy in full drag, crying on a payphone and begging a lover to let them come back. Suze cries as she watches this.

Arthur and Suze sit in bed as the Young Gents holler outside of their window. They discuss the nature of evolving over the course of a life after Suze admits that she'd like to be someone else. Suze asks Arthur if he loves her, and he tells her he "loves [her] for now" and that he worries about who she's becoming. Someone throws Arthur's clarinet through the bedroom window. Suze goes out to confront the gang as Arthur begs her not to. Arthur closes the door, Gene and Lon from the gang are stood behind it. Gene opens the closet door to reveal Teddy, who is bloodied and beaten. Teddy asks Arthur if they can hide out in his apartment. Suze returns, and Lon takes her keys as the Young Gents leave. She screams in fury.

Suze and Arthur go to the Blue Angel Club, attracting the attention of Billy, who joins them. They discuss gender expectations, and Billy flirts with Arthur. Billy tells Arthur that he has a theory about life which he'll tell him "some blue night." Suze demands to hear the theory. Billy smirks, telling Arthur and Suze that they both act "queer." Suze screams, flips the table, and grabs Arthur's hand to leave.

On the way home Suze rants to Arthur about Billy's insinuation. They see the Young Gents stripping Joanne's fathers' car. Joanne challenges the gang to be vulnerable with their feelings. Teddy volunteers, monologuing about the pressures of being compared to other men. Joanne is moved by this and Lon stabs her in the neck, killing her. Arthur yells in horror and Teddy runs over to him and Suze. Teddy warns them that the Young Gents are targeting them and he can't get the apartment keys back to them. Suze offers to trade their keys for Maureen's, and Teddy says he will try to get the swap. He affectionately says goodbye to Arthur.

Once home, Arthur kisses Suze after she repeats something Teddy said earlier. Suze runs into Billy on the staircase, who tells Suze his theory from the bar. In another fantasy, Teddy and Dickie kiss at and stroke Suze as the rest of the Young Gents gyrate around her. She whispers "please, baby, please" several times.

Suze goes through Teddy's leather jacket, grabbing a ticket stub then leaving the apartment. At the gay porn theater the stub was for she starts asking patrons about Teddy. A man sitting in the back says that he knows of the Young Gents, he reveals himself to be a cop who is about to bust the theater full of "criminal queers". On his advice, Suze leaves.

Arthur runs into Teddy, who asks if he's ever thought about other men before, which Arthur silently confirms. They embrace as a wedding party exits a hall and dance. The bride bumps into Arthur and condescends to him about Teddy. Teddy proceeds to beat the groom up while Arthur watches. Once home alone, Arthur hears Suze return. He tells her that there is nothing wrong with either of them, they just need to "figure it out."

Arthur, Ida, Baker, and Les sit in Arthur and Suze's apartment as Suze dances. The Young Gents barge into the apartment and hold everyone hostage. Lon returns Suze's keys and she gives him Maureen's. Gene leaves to rob Maureen's apartment; Teddy, Dickie, and Lon stay to watch the hostages. Lon mocks Arthur for marrying Suze and Suze stabs him to death. She yells at the couple's friends to leave, and reminds Dickie that Lon killed Joanne. Dickie punches Suze in the eye, saying she has been asking for it; Teddy tells Arthur they will be back to take care of Lon's body. Suze sits in a chair while Arthur crawls over and kisses her feet, mirroring the earlier scene. Suze goes to Maureen's apartment where she finds the remaining Young Gents dead, as well as Billy and Maureen's husband, who Suze saw at the porn theater.

Suze, sporting a short haircut and black eye, is in the apartment dressing up in Teddy's clothes. Arthur dances coming back to the building and into the apartment. Arthur enters his bedroom, where Suze and Teddy are. Arthur and Teddy kiss passionately while Suze embraces Arthur from behind as she looks at the camera.

== Cast ==
- Andrea Riseborough as Suze
- Harry Melling as Arthur/Bijou 52 ticket taker
- Karl Glusman as Teddy
- Demi Moore as Maureen
- Ryan Simpkins as Dickie
- Jake Choi as Lon
- Karim Saleh as Gene
- Matt D'Elia as Raymond
- Jake Sidney Cohen as Russell
- Cole Escola as Billy
- Jaz Sinclair as Joanne
- Alisa Torres as Ida
- Yedoye Travis as Les
- Marquis Rodriguez as Baker
- Dana Ashbrook as Cal
- Mary Lynn Rajskub as Lois

In the feature audio commentary on the Blu-ray release of the film, Kramer confirms that Chris Eigeman is the voice of Arthur's father on the phone in a scene.

Director Amanda Kramer makes an uncredited cameo as a sailor in the bar scenes.

== Production ==
Amanda Kramer and Noel David Taylor wrote the screenplay in 2018; Kramer has said that she was able to convince producers to finance the film by calling it "the gay West Side Story," which Kramer described as "a lie" and "a Halloween trick".

In November 2019, Maya Hawke, Charlie Plummer, and Andrea Riseborough joined the cast of the film, with Kramer set to direct the film In October 2020, Demi Moore, Harry Melling, and Karl Glusman joined the cast of the film, with Hawke and Plummer no longer attached. In November 2020, Ryan Simpkins, Karim Saleh, Jake Choi, Matt D'Elia, Jake Sidney Cohen, Cole Escola, Jaz Sinclair, Dana Ashbrook, and Mary Lynn Rajskub were cast in the film.

Principal photography began in Butte, Montana, in October 2020. At one point the production was shut down for "a very long weekend" due to a COVID-19 outbreak on set.

== Release ==
Please Baby Please had its world premiere at the International Film Festival Rotterdam on January 26, 2022. In June 2022, Music Box Films acquired distribution rights to the film. It was released theatrically in the United States on October 28, 2022. The film began streaming on Mubi in the United States on March 3, 2023, and in most other territories on March 31, 2023. It is set to be released on DVD, in addition to a special edition Blu-ray by Vinegar Syndrome, on May 30, 2023.

The official motion picture soundtrack was released on November 22, 2023 featuring the score composed and performed by Giulio Carmassi and Bryan Scary.

== Reception ==
On the review aggregator website Rotten Tomatoes, 77% of 62 critics' reviews are positive, with an average rating of 6.3/10. The website's consensus reads: "It'll be too campy for some, but Please Baby Please benefits from an artful aesthetic that's just as striking as Andrea Riseborough's performance." Metacritic, which uses a weighted average, assigned the film a score of 65 out of 100, based on 18 critics, indicating "generally favorable" reviews.

Drew Gregory of Autostraddle gave the film a positive review, calling it "an exploration of gender entirely on its own terms, entirely on our terms," citing the film's "broad and stylized" dialogue, and praising Escola and Riseborough's performances. She did, however, criticize the treatment of Sinclair's character Joanne, writing, "Kramer utilizes a degree of violence largely absent from the more cartoonish nature of the rest of the movie. She doesn’t seem to consider the implications of this shocking violence happening to the one Black woman character."

== Accolades ==
Please Baby Please won the 2022 Outfest Grand Jury Award for North American Narrative Feature and was named one of the "10 Best Unsung LGBTQ Films of 2022" by GALECA. The film also receive a 2023 Queerty nomination for best Indie Movie.
