= Give Me Pity! =

- Film poster
- Directed by: Amanda Kramer
- Written by: Amanda Kramer
- Produced by: Jacob Agger; Sarah Winshall
- Starring: Sophie von Haselberg; Reshma Gajjar; Cricket Arrison; Shelley Long; M. Diesel; Tess Hewlett; Malachi Middleton
- Cinematography: Patrick Meade Jones
- Edited by: Benjamin Shearn
- Music by: Giulio Carmassi; Bryan Scary
- Production companies: Irving Harvey; Neon Heart Productions; Smudge Films
- Distributed by: Utopia; Aspect Ratio
- Release date: January 29, 2022 (International Film Festival Rotterdam)
- Running time: 80 minutes
- Country: United States
- Language: English
- Box office: $9,835

Give Me Pity! is a 2022 American psychedelic musical comedy film, directed and written by Amanda Kramer. The film stars Sophie von Haselberg as Sissy St Claire, an '80s television star, who gets her own television special, only to turn out not as expected.

The film had its world premiere at the International Film Festival Rotterdam on January 29, 2022.

== Synopsis ==
A young performer is allowed to shine in her very own TV special but this doesn't turn out as expected.

== Cast ==
- Sophie von Haselberg as Sissy St. Claire, an '80s television star
- Shelley Long as Baby Dog
- M. Diesel as Psychic

Additionally, Reshma Gajjar, Tess Hewlett, and Malachi Middleton star as the dancers.

== Production ==
Produced on a low-budget, Give Me Pity! was filmed in five days during the COVID-19 pandemic.

== Release ==
On January 7, 2022, Alief launched the global sales for the film. The film first premiered at the International Film Festival Rotterdam on January 29, 2022. It also premiered at the Fantasia International Film Festival on July 22, 2022, the Melbourne International Film Festival on August 12, 2022, the Edinburgh International Film Festival on August 15, 2022, the Fantastic Fest on September 23, 2022, the B3 Biennial of the Moving Image on October 16, 2022, and the Splat!FilmFest Horror Film Festival on October 27, 2022. On July 22, 2022, Utopia picked up the film distribution rights to the film, with Aspect Ratio serving as a co-distributor. The film had its New York City premiere on February 23, 2023, and was released to select digital platforms on March 7, 2023. On May 22, 2023, Bulldog Film Distribution picked up the film distribution rights for the United Kingdom and Ireland, and was released to theaters and on digital platforms on November 10, 2023.

== Reception ==
On the review aggregator website Rotten Tomatoes, 87% of 15 critics' reviews are positive, with an average rating of 6.9/10. Peter Bradshaw of The Guardian gave the film three out of five stars, writing "A genuinely strange and unsettling creation whose meaning and form can’t quite be pinned down".

=== Box office ===
In the United States, the film made $8,537 on its opening weekend, and made $8,572 totally. In the United Kingdom, it made $8,537 in just 18 theaters.
