= A Little Rhythm and a Wicked Feeling =

2020 EP by Magdalena Bay

EP by Magdalena Bay
- Released: March 13, 2020
- Genres: Bubblegum pop; electronic pop
- Length: 27:55
- Labels: Luminelle; The Orchard
- Producer: Magdalena Bay

Magdalena Bay chronology
Mini Mix, Vol. 1 (2019)	A Little Rhythm and a Wicked Feeling (2020)	Mini Mix, Vol. 2 (2020)

Singles from A Little Rhythm and a Wicked Feeling
- 1. "Venice" Released: August 15, 2019; 2. "Good Intentions" Released: September 26, 2019; 3. "Killshot" Released: October 30, 2019; 4. "Oh Hell" Released: December 12, 2019; 5. "How to Get Physical" Released: January 13, 2020; 6. "Airplane" Released: February 26, 2020

Professional ratings
Review scores
Source	Rating
Pitchfork	7.5/10

A Little Rhythm and a Wicked Feeling is the third extended play (EP) by the American musical duo Magdalena Bay, released on March 13, 2020, through Luminelle Recordings and The Orchard.

== Promotion ==
The first single from the EP, "Venice", was released on August 15, 2019. The dance-pop song was accompanied by a "highly cinematic" music video described as a "dreamy and strange slice of pop escapism". "Good Intentions" was released on September 26, 2019, and described as "a crying at the club-type of song" that "looks back on a relationship and sways between acceptance and flashes of emotion." Third single "Killshot" arrived on October 30, 2019, followed by "Oh Hell" on December 12, 2019. The latter song is an "emotional indie ballad" whose video features singer Mica Tennenbaum singing underwater. Fifth single "How to Get Physical" was released on January 13, 2020, and was described as "a bold, inspired song that tackles that awkward feeling of not having the self-confidence to just let loose and dance".

== Critical reception ==
Pitchfork contributor Ashley Bardham wrote of the EP, "Rather than obscuring emotion, their manufactured sound invokes its own kind of nostalgic joy. A Little Rhythm and a Wicked Feeling is a reminder that exaggeration or artificiality don’t have to mean soullessness; pop music is supposed to be a loud, flashy monument to earnest, embarrassing emotion. Listen to it shamelessly, euphorically, with love in your heart."

== Track listing ==
All tracks are written by and produced by Magdalena Bay.

A Little Rhythm and a Wicked Feeling track listing
No.	Title	Length
1.	"How to Get Physical"	3:10
2.	"Story"	3:40
3.	"Good Intentions"	3:36
4.	"Airplane"	3:45
5.	"Venice"	3:16
6.	"Killshot"	3:56
7.	"Stop & Go"	3:04
8.	"Oh Hell"	3:28
Total length:		27:55
