= Theatrical style =

In theatre, a theatrical style is a set of conventions governing the way a play is performed. Theatrical styles can generally be divided into two categories: realistic or non-realistic. The choice of theatrical style may be associated with artistic movements that were prevalent when the play was written or when the work was being staged, and is often intended to serve specific aims and concepts. More than one style may be used for a production, with a mix of styles used across acting, set design, and costumes.

There are four basic theatrical genres either defined, implied, or derived by or from Aristotle: Tragedy, Comedy, Melodrama, and Drama. Any number of theatrical styles can be used to convey these forms.

== Styles ==
There are a variety of theatrical styles used in theater/drama. These include:

Naturalism: Portraying life on stage with close attention to detail, based on observation of real life. Cause and effect are central to the script's structure, with the subjects focused on conflicts of nature vs. nurture, the natural order of things, survival, or notions of evolution. The production style is one of everyday reality.

Realism: Portraying characters on stage that are close to real life, with realistic settings and staging. Realism is an effort to satisfy all the theatrical conventions necessary to the production, but to do so in a way that seems to be "normal" life.

Surrealism: A movement in various areas of art, including painting, sculpture, and theater. The aim of surrealist theater is to overcome and eradicate the old, tired traditions of theater that placed restrictions on the imagination.

Expressionism: Anti-realistic in seeing appearance as distorted and the truth lies within man. The outward appearance on stage can be distorted and unrealistic to portray an external truth or internal emotional conflict.

Absurdity and Surrealism: Presents a perspective that all human attempts at significance are illogical. Ultimate truth is chaos with little certainty. There is no necessity that needs to drive us.

Epic Theatre: As devised by Bertolt Brecht, epic theatre forces audience members to constantly return to rational observation, rather than emotional immersion. Sudden bursts of song, elements of absurdity, and breaches of the fourth wall are all prime examples of how this rational observation is constantly revitalized; this idea is known as Verfremdungseffekt.

Melodrama: As devised by early Greek dramatists, these styles rely on stock characters and stereotypes to portray stories in an exaggerated way, either tragic or comic. Links to commedia dell'arte.

Theater of Cruelty: As developed by Antonin Artaud, a style that encourages the shock and horror of the audience, through the excessive use of light and sound, instead of active entertainment or emotional relaxation.

Physical theater: A modernist approach to theater which centralizes a performer's movement as the key communicator of a play's storytelling.

Poor theatre: Developed by Jerzy Growotski, this genre believes in the stripping back of set, props, costume, light, and sound to allow the focus to be placed solely upon the actors, their characterization, and the underlying human relationships.

Immersive theater: Developed by Augusto Boal, these styles all place focus on the audience member's individuality: their personal decisions, opinions, and emotions, and how these impacts those of the characters onstage. The audience firmly exists within the "world of the play". Links to Promenade and Forum theatre.
