= Mercurial World =

2021 studio album by Magdalena Bay

- Standard edition cover

Studio album by Magdalena Bay
- Released: October 8, 2021
- Genre: Synth-pop; electronic pop
- Length: 46:05
- Label: Luminelle
- Producer: Magdalena Bay

Magdalena Bay chronology
Mini Mix, Vol. 2 (2020)	Mercurial World (2021)	Mini Mix, Vol. 3 (2023)

Singles from Mercurial World
- 1. "Chaeri" Released: June 30, 2021; 2. "Secrets (Your Fire)" Released: August 11, 2021; 3. "You Lose!" Released: September 15, 2021; 4. "Hysterical Us" Released: October 5, 2021

Mercurial World is the debut studio album by the American musical duo Magdalena Bay, released on October 8, 2021, through Luminelle Recordings. Developed for two years, Mercurial World was written, produced, and recorded by both members of the duo, the vocalist Mica Tenenbaum and the multi-instrumentalist Matthew Lewin. The 14-track album draws mainly on synth-pop and electronic pop styles, featuring predominant synthesizers and drums. Lyrically, the album centers on a theory about the passage of time and existence, while also leaning to themes of relationships, technology, and evolution.

Four singles—"Chaeri", "Secrets (Your Fire)", "You Lose!", and "Hysterical Us"—accompanied Mercurial World, along with music videos for all four and the album track "Dreamcatching". The conceptual visuals incorporate retro and Y2K aesthetics. To further promote the album, Magdalena Bay embarked on their first headlining concert tour, the Mercurial Tour, and performed at other events.

Upon its release, Mercurial World received mostly positive reviews from music critics; some of them praised its production and style, while the less enthusiastic reviewers criticized the lyricism. Commercially, the album reached two secondary Billboard charts in the United States. A 28-track deluxe edition was released on September 23, 2022; supported by three singles, it includes remixes by Cecile Believe and Danny L Harle, as well as fan-made voicemails.

== Background and development ==
The vocalist Mica Tenenbaum and the multi-instrumentalist Matthew Lewin first met at the age of 15 playing music in different bands at a concert organized for their after-school music program, located in Miami, United States. Tenenbaum then joined Tabula Rasa, Lewin's progressive rock band, that was influenced by the bands Yes, Genesis, and King Crimson. Following the releases of two albums, they disbanded when the members started their academic studies. While attending colleges in different American states, Tenenbaum and Lewin then reconnected with the goal of making pop music, inspired by several musicians including Fiona Apple, St. Vincent, and Grimes. In 2016, Tenenbaum and Lewin formed the duo Magdalena Bay and released the single "Voc Pop". Two years later, they moved to an apartment in Los Angeles, where they recorded music videos on a green screen. After releasing several singles and extended plays (EPs) with a DIY approach, they gained a cult following among pop fans and signed a recording contract with Luminelle Recordings. Their EP A Little Rhythm and a Wicked Feeling was released on March 13, 2020; it was planned to be promoted by a series of concerts supporting the bands Kero Kero Bonito and Yumi Zouma, before they were cancelled due to the COVID-19 lockdowns.

Following the cancellation of the tour, Magdalena Bay decided to start working on their debut full-length studio album. They recorded together in their home studio, which "immersed [them] in [their] creative, insular universe" and contributed to the album's "particular sense of madness in containment", according to Lewin. He was suspended from his job and had time to concentrate on creating music. In mid-2020, the duo listed all the songs they had written for the album, along with their themes. Both musicians noticed that the songs were mainly about them observing the passage of time and feeling overwhelmed by the universe; in an interview with Vulture's Justin Curto in 2021, Tenenbaum stated that the result contained a subconscious pattern. The album title was decided to be Mercurial World after writing the title track because the duo felt that it "sums up" the themes present on all the tracks. They also said that most of the album was a result of their quarter-life crisis.

== Composition ==
=== Overview ===
Magdalena Bay entirely wrote, produced, recorded, mixed, and mastered Mercurial World. The standard edition of the album contains 14 tracks. Musically, it is a synth-pop and electronic pop album, with influences from several genres including 1980s and 1990s pop music, psychedelia, disco, electronica, EDM, and hyperpop. By the time of Mercurial World's release, Lewin stated that they were "figuring out what Magdalena Bay sounds like". Its production predominantly includes synthesizers, drum beats, and pop hooks, while also drawing from rock guitars and easy listening piano. The hooks of several songs are low-energy and mid-tempo. The album was influenced by the indie pop bands MGMT and Chvrches, as well as the musicians Grimes, Charli XCX, and Caroline Polachek. Matt Colar of AllMusic compared Tenenbaum's "baby-voice" to that of the singer Kate Bush. Writing for PopMatters, Rob Moura compared Mercurial World to the production of Art Angels (2015) by Grimes, the bubblegum of Kero Kero Bonito, the strings and piano of Future Nostalgia (2020) by the singer Dua Lipa, and the overall works of the project M83.

Lyrically, the album's main theme is the passage of time, while also leaning to relationship issues, stress about the future, technology, and evolution. The album focuses on an abstract theory described by Tenenbaum: "If there's nothingness before you're born and nothingness after you die, it creates kind of a meeting point here, and life creates the circle of what goes around that, so in that way, there is no end". The duo cited Fiona Apple as an influence for their songwriting, noting that Lewin introduced Tenenbaum to her music as a teenager. When discussing the inspirations on the album, Lewin said that he and Tenenbaum "processed them and then, hopefully, turned them into something that [they] feel is more representative" of the duo.

=== Songs ===
Mercurial World opens with "The End", a song with lyrics that question whether an ending exists. It interpolates Madonna's "Material Girl" (1985). The album starts and finishes with a loop by a curtain call that connects the first to the last track, "The Beginning". About that topic, the duo stated that they have "made this moment eternal" and that "it's like the music itself becomes the answer to the question". The title track and "Dawning of the Season" are synth-pop songs with pop key changes. In the latter, the duo deals with insecurities and curing anxiety with body movement. "Secrets (Your Fire)" is a yacht rock song made by synthesizers, guitars, and a 1970s-inspired funk bassline. It was influenced by the singers Gwen Stefani and Britney Spears, and the disco band Chic; according to the magazine Under the Radar, it is also reminiscent of the production of Mariah Carey's "Fantasy" (1995). As explained by Magdalena Bay, the lyrics are centered on "digital anxiety", dealing with the over-sharing online and the duo's desire for privacy. The upbeat fifth track, "You Lose!", was categorized by critics as pop rock and noise pop. It is led by chiptune, and contains playground chants, guitars, and samples from video games over Tenenbaum's vocals. It emphasizes on a failed relationship, with sound effects indicating a game over. The following track, "Something for 2", includes electronic beats.

The seventh track on Mercurial World, the synth-pop and progressive house song "Chaeri", focuses on mental health and friendships, detailing the feeling of abandoning a friend with mental health problems. The Line of Best Fit's Olivia Swash compared the track's electro dance beat to the music of the singer Robyn. The duo was inspired to create the song after watching the film Uncut Gems (2019) and listening to Gigi D'Agostino's "L'amour toujours" (2000), the single featured in the credits. The eighth track, titled "Halfway", has an existential theme over a production primarily characterized by bleeps and synthesizers, while "Hysterical Us" includes elements of bubblegum pop and synth-rock, and lyrics about anxiety and paranoia. The lyrical content of "Prophecy" and "Follow the Leader" represents a search for meaning; musically, the former is a baroque pop ballad, while the latter contains robotic vocals and electronic instrumentals, and was seen by Katherine St. Asaph of Pitchfork as similar to Beyoncé's "Party" (2011). "Domino" contains "scratchy" guitars reminiscent of Night Time, My Time (2013) by the singer Sky Ferreira, as remarked by Ben Cohn from Beats Per Minute. "Dreamcatching" is a hyperpop song, on which Tenenbaum uses her soprano voice to express the desire to explore the world with a partner. Cohn also compared "The Beginning" to "Boys" (2008) by the singer-songwriter Ashlee Simpson. "The Beginning" closes the album with a dissolved voice of Tenenbaum whispering "Matt, Matt". The album is an infinite loop, starting with the same whispers before shouting, "Wake up."

=== Deluxe edition ===
The deluxe edition provides 14 more tracks to the track listing. It adds previously unreleased songs that were discarded from the original track listing, remixes and alternative versions of album tracks, and voicemails from fans dubbed as "secrets". Magdalena Bay wanted the deluxe edition to have "its own concept and flow to it, but [to feel] separate from the original record", as stated by Lewin in an interview with Vogue.

The revamped track listing of the deluxe edition includes eight interspersed interludes, named "Secret 1", "Secrets 2-9: Medley", "Secret 10", "Secret 11", "Secret 12", "Secret 13", "Secret 14", and "Secret 15". "Unconditional" is placed as the fourth track; it is a pop song that was conceived by Magdalena Bay as the "weird little cousin" of "Secrets (Your Fire)". An 8-bit remix of "You Lose!" and a remix of "Something for 2" by the musician Cecile Believe are included as the tenth and eleventh songs, respectively. "All You Do", the seventeenth track, is a soft rock and dream pop song with a minimalist start. Its production contains acoustic guitars, live drums, bass, and strings. In its lyrics, Tenenbaum portrays a continuous quest for fulfillment: "I only drink when I'm drunk / Can't fall asleep on my own / I only wanna have some fun / Let the party never end". It is followed by an orchestral rearrangement of "Prophecy", subtitled "Synth & Strings". Two different versions of "Chaeri" are proximate in the track listing: an energetic remix by the producer Danny L Harle and an orchestral version. "Dominó", a Spanish version of "Domino", replaces the original. The penultimate track is the "Piano & Strings" version of the title track, "Mercurial World", which precedes the last fan-made voicemail.

== Release and promotion ==
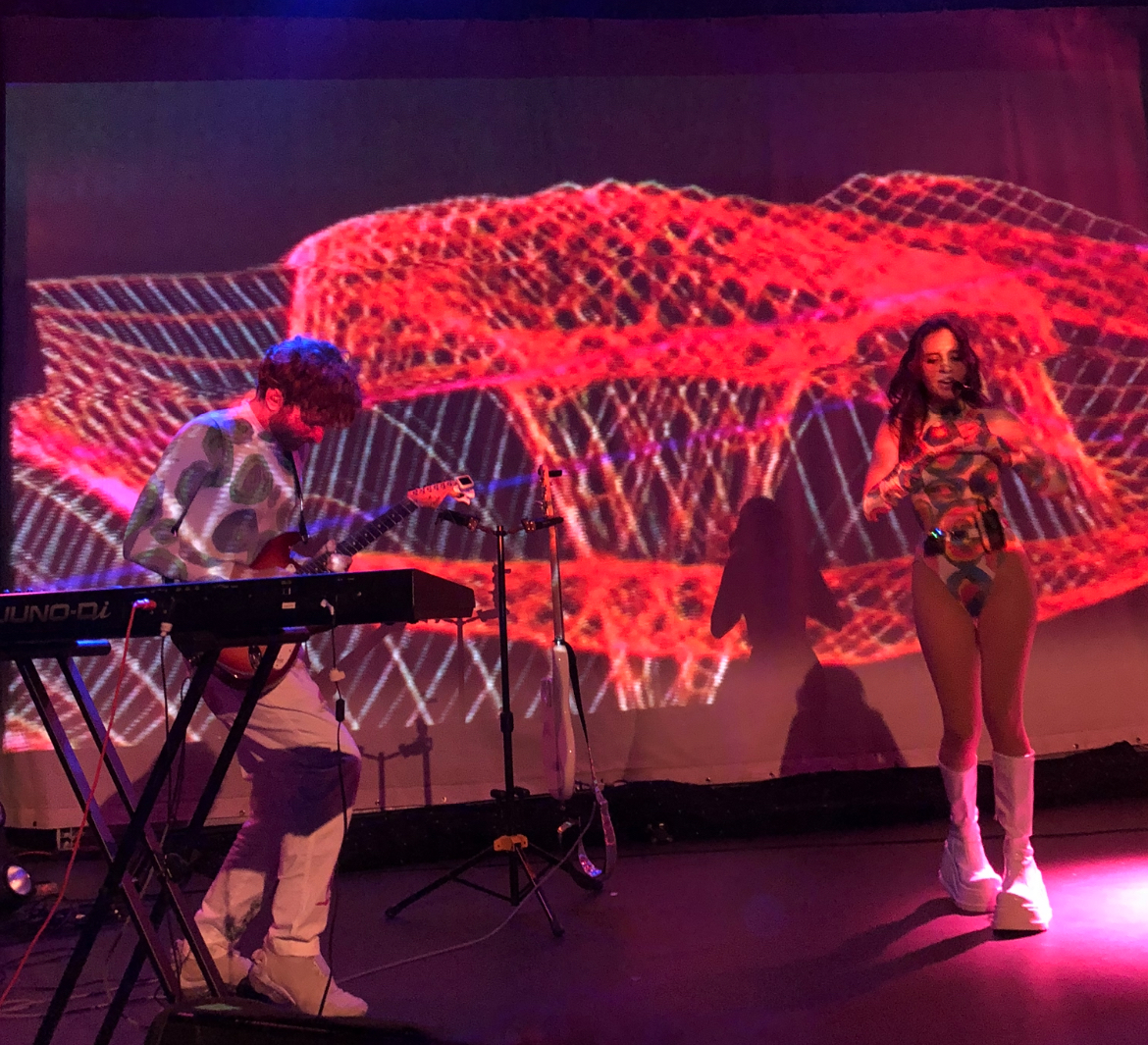
Lewin and Tenenbaum performing in October 2021

Magdalena Bay announced Mercurial World on June 30, 2021, and subsequently revealed its track listing and released its lead single, "Chaeri". They captioned their Spotify profile with "synth-pop straight from the simulation". The single was accompanied by a music video, which premiered through The Fader. Recorded at a film studio by a professional team hired by Magdalena Bay, the video was described by the duo as an "abstract, sci-fi cybercult, symbology-ridden, laser light show masterpiece". The second single, "Secrets (Your Fire)", was released on August 11, 2021, alongside a video that sees the duo inside a 2000s desktop computer. On September 15, 2021, "You Lose!" was released as the album's third single alongside another music video, which depicts Tenenbaum and Lewin in several humorous and failing situations. "Hysterical Us" was released as the fourth and final single from Mercurial World on October 5, 2021, along with an Ian Clontz-directed visual filmed with the Milagros Collective in New Orleans. On December 6, 2021, Magdalena Bay shared a live performance video for "You Lose!". A music video for the track "Dreamcatching" premiered on March 3, 2022; it was directed by Felix Green and was made with Generative Adversarial Network and VQGAN-CLIP technology, which creates images based on text and other pictures. All videos involved conceptual themes.

The album was also promoted digitally with lo-fi aesthetics and retro visuals apart from the music videos. Magdalena Bay shared TikTok videos inspired by David Lynch's filmography, a videogame recalling Galaga (1981), weekly live streams on the service Twitch, and an official website made by Tenenbaum with a Y2K aesthetic and GIFs. According to Tenenbaum, they "buil[t] a world" around their music while "learning how to communicate" through it. The duo was also influenced by David Cronenberg's films, including Videodrome (1983).

Mercurial World was released through Luminelle Records on October 8, 2021, serving as the follow-up to A Little Rhythm and a Wicked Feeling. Commercially, it appeared on two Billboard charts in the United States, peaking at number 18 on the Heatseekers Albums chart and at number 59 on the Current Album Sales chart. Mercurial World was supported by a one-off show in Los Angeles on the same date of its release, and by the Mercurial Tour, which was the duo's first headlining concert tour. It was announced on December 6, 2021, and included three short legs; the first took place in December 2021, the second in February 2022, and the third in March and April 2022. Magdalena Bay also performed at the first edition of the This Ain't No Picnic festival held in Pasadena, and supported Charli XCX as well as the musicians Flume and Porter Robinson in their respective tours. The duo performed "Chaeri", "Dawning of the Season", "Secrets (Your Fire)", and "You Lose!" at Variety's Live From My Den event.

On July 19, 2022, Magdalena Bay announced the deluxe edition of Mercurial World. On the same day, a Danny L Harle remix of "Chaeri" was released. They also shared North American tour dates from July to December 2022. The second single from the edition, "All You Do", was released on August 24, 2022, alongside a video directed by Luke Orlando. On September 20, 2022, "Unconditional" premiered as the edition's third single, alongside a self-directed visual. The edition was released on September 23, 2022, also through Luminelle Recordings.

== Critical reception ==
Professional ratings
Aggregate scores
Source	Rating
Metacritic	78/100
Review scores
Source	Rating
AllMusic	4/5 stars
Beats Per Minute	74%
Exclaim!	7/10
The Guardian	3/5 stars
Pitchfork	8.0/10
PopMatters	8/10
Under the Radar	8.5/10 stars

According to retrospective analysis by publications, Mercurial World received critical acclaim. On the review aggregator site Metacritic, the album holds a weighted average score of 78 out of 100 based on 8 reviews, indicating "generally favorable" reception.

The production on the album received praise from reviewers, some of whom described it as "carefully" and "smartly crafted". Ben Cohn from Beats Per Minute said that Magdalena Bay has a "relentless dedication to detail" on the album, and the well-produced songs differences them from their contemporaries. Tenenbaum's vocal interpretation received praise from Cohn and The Guardian's Laura Snapes; the latter described her performance as "wraithlike and vaporous" with punchy vocals that "land with stealth when they're given space".

Caleb Campbell of Under the Radar lauded the duo for covering several styles in the album, as well as its cohesion and anthemic songs. The critic also praised them for "manag[ing] to occupy a space all their own" in the pop industry. AllMusic's Matt Colar said that the album offers "melodic highs and deeper sonic layers to explore". St. Asaph admired the "impeccably timed" key and tempo changes, while Moura opined that the diverse topics make it "feel like a proper album".

Less enthusiastic reviewers described Mercurial World as overproduced and said that it does not build to a satisfying climax. Cohn believed that the album never "reach[es] a boil" and that the duo "suit[s] their music more for a bedroom dance party than a club night out", while wanting the album to be "a little more alive". St. Asaph thought that Mercurial World's compositions "sag in the middle". Reviewers also commented on the lyricism on Mercurial World, with some writing it was below expectations. St. Asaph perceived it as "more conventional" to their influences, adding that it seems like "unadorned afterthoughts" compared to the album's production. Exclaim!'s Kaelen Bell thought that some songs suffer from "broad, placeholder" lyricism. Snapes believed they were often buried under the album's "sunbaked" and over-processed production.

Our Culture Mag, PopMatters, and Pitchfork included Mercurial World on their year-end listicles of the best albums released in 2021, at numbers 19, 20, and 49, respectively. It was also included on Rob Sheffield's list for Rolling Stone at number 13, as well as on Sheldon Pearce's unranked list for The New Yorker. Additionally, the album was added by Pitchfork to a list of the best progressive pop music of 2021. Several critics highlighted "Chaeri" as a standout from Mercurial World. The latter website named it the 42nd best song of 2021, while Curto ranked it at number five, writing that it is "their best attempt yet to enter [the expertly crafted pop songs] pantheon — while staying true to themselves". In 2024, Paste called Mercurial World one of the 25 best debut albums of the 2020s.

== Track listing ==
All tracks are written by Magdalena Bay.

Standard edition track listing
No.	Title	Length
1.	"The End"	0:31
2.	"Mercurial World"	3:01
3.	"Dawning of the Season"	3:24
4.	"Secrets (Your Fire)"	4:05
5.	"You Lose!"	3:24
6.	"Something for 2"	3:36
7.	"Chaeri"	4:17
8.	"Halfway"	1:58
9.	"Hysterical Us"	3:55
10.	"Prophecy"	3:34
11.	"Follow the Leader"	3:04
12.	"Domino"	3:42
13.	"Dreamcatching"	3:27
14.	"The Beginning"	4:01
Total length:		45:05

Deluxe edition track listing
No.	Title	Length
1.	"Secret 1"	0:22
2.	"The End"	0:31
3.	"Mercurial World"	3:01
4.	"Unconditional"	3:09
5.	"Dawning of the Season"	3:24
6.	"Secrets (Your Fire)"	4:06
7.	"Secrets 2-9: Medley"	1:45
8.	"You Lose!"	3:24
9.	"Secret 10"	0:08
10.	"You Lose!" (8-Bit)	1:36
11.	"Something for 2" (Cecile Believe remix)	4:10
12.	"Chaeri"	4:17
13.	"Secret 11"	0:19
14.	"Halfway"	1:58
15.	"Hysterical Us"	3:56
16.	"Secret 12"	0:18
17.	"All You Do"	4:28
18.	"Prophecy" (Synth & Strings)	4:02
19.	"Follow the Leader"	3:04
20.	"Secret 13"	0:03
21.	"Chaeri" (Danny L Harle remix)	3:22
22.	"Chaeri" (Piano & Strings)	4:42
23.	"Dominó" (Spanish version)	3:43
24.	"Dreamcatching"	3:27
25.	"Secret 14"	0:10
26.	"The Beginning"	4:01
27.	"Mercurial World" (Piano & Strings)	3:09
28.	"Secret 15"	0:14
Total length:		70:54

== Personnel ==
The personnel is adapted from the standard and deluxe edition liner notes.

Magdalena Bay

- Mica Tenenbaum – vocals, production, recording
- Matthew Lewin – production, recording, mixing, mastering

Other musicians

- Nick Villa – drums ("Something for 2" and "Hysterical Us")
- Louie Diller – drums ("Domino", "The Beginning", and "Dominó (Spanish Version)")
- Juan Ignacio Varela – saxophone ("Secrets (Your Fire)")
- Giacomo Cazzaro – saxophone ("Secrets (Your Fire)")
- Matthew Roberts – drums, percussion ("Unconditional" and "All You Do")
- Oliver Hill – string arrangement (orchestral versions)
- Julian McClanahan Calvert – violin, viola (orchestral versions)
- David Tangney – cello (orchestral versions)

Art

- Ram Han – artwork (standard edition)
- Max Taeuschel – layout (standard edition)
- John Sampson – art (deluxe edition)

== Charts ==
Chart performance for Mercurial World
Chart (2021)	Peak position
US Current Album Sales (Billboard)	59
US Heatseekers Albums (Billboard)	18
