= Magdalena Bay (duo) =

American musical duo

- Magdalena Bay performing in 2023

Background information
- Origin: Miami, Florida, U.S.
- Genres: Synth-pop; electropop; indie pop; alt-pop; experimental pop
- Years active: 2016–present
- Labels: Luminelle; The Orchard; Mom + Pop
- Spinoff of: Tabula Rasa
- Members: Mica Tenenbaum; Matthew Lewin
- Website: mercurialworld.com imaginaldisk.world www.magdalenabaymusic.com

Magdalena Bay is an American alternative pop duo formed in 2016 in Miami, Florida, and currently based in Los Angeles, California. The duo consists of Mica Tenenbaum and Matthew Lewin, who met in high school and are romantic partners. Both members write and produce together, and are joined by Nick Villa (drums) and Myles Sweeney (keyboards) during live performances. They have released two studio albums, three EPs, and three mixtapes titled Mini Mixes.

The duo released their debut studio album, Mercurial World, in 2021. They have been noted for their informational TikTok videos on the music industry and their kitschy, DIY visuals, often inspired by early-2000s internet culture. Their second album, Imaginal Disk, was released in 2024 to widespread critical acclaim, followed by a musical film of the same name in 2026.

== Early and personal lives ==
Mica Tenenbaum was born in Buenos Aires, Argentina, and immigrated with her family to the United States when she was one year old, growing up in Miami. Matthew Lewin was born in Miami and is of Argentine descent on his father's side. Both Tenenbaum and Lewin are Jewish. Tenenbaum and Lewin were raised in Miami, with Tenenbaum attending Design and Architecture Senior High School and Lewin attending Krop High School. They originally met in high school in 2011 at a program run by Live! Modern School of Music, where they were placed in a classic rock cover band and later began writing and performing their own progressive rock music with other musicians (including current Magdalena Bay touring drummer Nick Villa) as Tabula Rasa, releasing a self-titled EP, and a self-titled studio album. Tenenbaum studied communications at the University of Pennsylvania while Lewin majored in music business at Northeastern University. They are currently based in Los Angeles, having moved there in 2018.

== Career ==
=== 2016–2019: Formation, first singles and covers ===
After Tabula Rasa released their final album, Crimson, Tenenbaum and Lewin formed Magdalena Bay in 2016 while on vacation from college and continued to collaborate remotely. The duo reconnected creatively over their appreciation for alternative pop artists Grimes, Chairlift, and Charli XCX, and wanted to recreate the sounds they were inspired by in a new project, which they named after Maggie Bay, an administrator at Lewin's former job. Their first single, "Voc Pop", was released on June 1 2016; the single has been since removed from streaming services and YouTube but can still be found on SoundCloud. In September 2016, the duo released a cover of "Head over Heels" by Tears For Fears, accompanied by a music video. 2017 saw the releases of the singles "Neon" (alongside a music video), "Set Me Off", "Drive Alone", and "Move Slow", and 2018 saw the releases of "Waking Up", "The Girls", and "Ghost".

=== 2019–2020: First EPs, Mini Mix Vol 1. and Mini Mix Vol 2. ===
In January 2019, Magdalena Bay released their first two EPs Day/Pop, and Night/Pop, containing remastered versions of their early singles and covers. In February, the duo began releasing short music videos on YouTube as part of a "Mag Minis" series, starting with "Afternoon in Heaven". The "Mag Minis" series led to the duo being signed by indie label Luminelle Recordings, and the full "Mag Minis" series was released to streaming services as the mixtape Mini Mix Vol. 1 on July 19. The duo released their first EP for Luminelle Records, A Little Rhythm and a Wicked Feeling, on March 13, 2020, and their second mixtape, Mini Mix, Vol. 2, on November 20, 2020. In 2021, their song "Killshot" went viral on social media after being used to soundtrack fancams.

=== 2021–2023: Mercurial World, Mini Mix Vol. 3, and first tour ===
The duo released their debut studio album, Mercurial World, on October 8, 2021. The album's release was preceded by four singles: "Chaeri", "Secrets (Your Fire)", "You Lose!", and "Hysterical Us". The album was teased with a "Y2K-inspired" website designed by Tenenbaum, and music videos accompanying the album's singles were also released in promotion of the album. A deluxe version of Mercurial World, containing fan-submitted "secrets", remixes, and two new songs, was released on September 23, 2022.

Magdalena Bay performed at several prominent festivals in support of Mercurial World, including Primavera Sound in June 2022, Porter Robinson's Second Sky in October 2022, Coachella in April 2023 and Lollapalooza in August 2023. On April 13, 2023, Magdalena Bay released a third mixtape, Mini Mix, Vol. 3.

=== 2024–present: Imaginal Disk and Nice Day ===
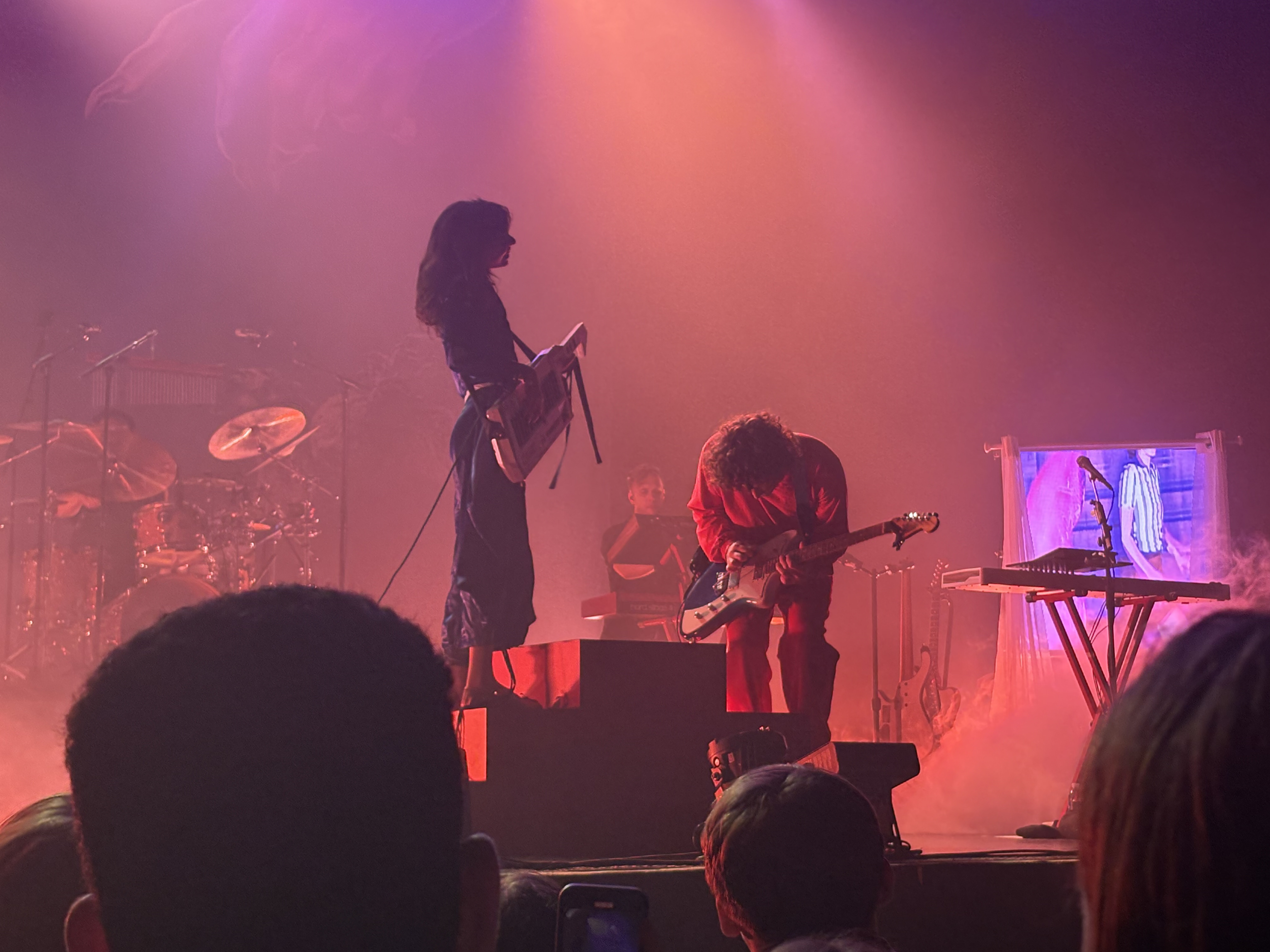
Magdalena Bay performing during the Imaginal Mystery Tour in 2025.

On May 28, 2024, Magdalena Bay released the single "Death & Romance", their first release under Mom + Pop Music, and also announced their "Imaginal Mystery Tour". On July 10, 2024, the single and accompanying music video for "Image" was released. In a post-music video livestream, the duo announced their second studio album, Imaginal Disk. On July 31, 2024, the album's third single, "Tunnel Vision", was released. The final single, "That's My Floor", was released on August 21, 2024. Imaginal Disk was released on August 23, 2024, to widespread critical acclaim.

On March 28, 2025, Magdalena Bay appeared on triple j's Like a Version segment where they performed "Image" and covered David Bowie's "Ashes to Ashes". In support of Imaginal Disk, Magdalena Bay performed at several festivals, returning to Primavera Sound and playing at III Points Music Festival in Miami. In summer 2025, they opened for Halsey and Billie Eilish. On July 31, 2025, they returned to Lollapalooza.

On August 23, 2025, the one-year anniversary of Imaginal Disk, the duo announced that a visual album "movie" was in production. The film premiered at the Tribeca Festival on June 4, 2026. It is currently unknown when the film will be publicly released, but director Amanda Kramer stated at a screening of the film that it is planned for the film to eventually be released via physical media and streaming.

In September 2025, they released two new songs as a double single, "Second Sleep" and "Star Eyes", which they described as a "spiritual successor" to Imaginal Disk. "Second Sleep" was previewed live earlier in the year at a Lollapalooza aftershow in Chicago. In October, they released another double single, "Human Happens" and "Paint Me a Picture". On Halloween, they released "Unoriginal" and "Black-Eyed Susan Climb". To close off the release of their double singles, they released "This Is The World (I Made It For You)" and "Nice Day" in November. The singles were compiled into a box set titled Nice Day: A Collection of Singles.

On May 22, 2026, they played their first show South American show in C Art Media in Buenos Aires, Argentina, Tenenbaum's country of birth. At this show, they performed covers of two songs by different Argentine musicians: Charly García's "Ojos de Video Tape" and Fito Páez's "11 y 6".

== Musical style and influences ==
The group has been described as synthpop, and they have cited Grimes, Chairlift, St. Vincent, and Charli XCX as influences. Tenenbaum has also called Fiona Apple her biggest songwriting influence. After the release of Imaginal Disk, Lewin said, "I think what would be a positive thing is if we start to be seen less as a pop group and more like an 'alternative' group." Paste described them as "a pop act with a rockist core", featuring progressive rock, shoegaze and disco influences. Lewin and Tenenbaum independently listened to progressive rock and classic rock growing up. Lewin admitted to "making fun of people for liking popular music." He shared these influences with Tenenbaum once they met.

== Members ==
Current members

- Mica Tenenbaum – lead vocals, bass, keytar (2016–present)
- Matthew Lewin – keyboards, synthesizer, guitar, bass, programming, backing vocals (2016–present)

Current touring musicians

- Nick Villa – drums (2022–present) (Note: While not considered a member of the band, Villa has played drums on the band's recordings since Mercurial World (2021).)
- Myles Sweeney – keyboards, guitar, bass (2024–present)

== Discography ==
Studio albums

- Mercurial World (2021)
- Imaginal Disk (2024)

== Tours ==
Headlining

- The Mercurial Tour (2021–2022)
- The Imaginal Mystery Tour (2024–2026)

Opening act

- Charli XCX - Crash: The Live Tour (2022)
- Caroline Polachek - Spiraling Tour (2023)
- Rina Sawayama - Hold the Girl Reloaded Tour (2023)
- Billie Eilish – Hit Me Hard and Soft: The Tour (2025)
- Halsey – For My Last Trick: The Tour (2025)
- Hayley Williams - "The Hayley Williams Show" (2026)
