= Montreal DIY music scene =

Since the late 2000s, numerous musical artists from the neighborhood of Mile End, Montreal have recorded, released and performed what the press has considered to be weird, experimental, DIY music of a variety of styles. All of these acts that are considered a part of the DIY scene initially played their music at parties only around the Montreal area, but it wasn't until the year of the release of singer-songwriter Grimes' album Visions (2012) that the subculture garnered attention worldwide.

== Background and early history ==
The noise scene is super important. I value it as music, but I think at least with my experience of Montreal it’s about doing something, making something happen, pushing things forward. It’s a lot about the community that surrounds it, so we kind of took that sentiment and worked it into our pop music thing.

—Sebastian Cowan in a 2013 Dazed magazine interview

In 2007, many artists including Sebastian Cowan, Alexander Cowan, Ezra Gray and Jeff Boyd, as well as video director Emily Kai Bock, formed the artist collective and venue space Lab Synthese in Mile End, Montreal, Quebec. Acts from the Mile End neighborhood such as Godspeed You! Black Emperor and Arcade Fire are considered the DIY scene's ancestors. Kai Bock recalled the place being "really intense and beautiful." She highlighted its "glow of inspiration that filled [bedrooms] during the shows, and the rich conversations that lasted late into the night would sometimes leave me with a deep sadness that such an oasis of collaboration couldn't last forever."

Several acts of the Montreal scene started performing in parties at Lab Synthese and other venues close to it, and Dazed magazine described the live shows as "forcefully human" and "overly theatrical." The artists performed at these parties where it was more "secure" for them, explained musician CFCF, instead of touring in other places; this was because, as Dazed analyzed, most audiences outside of Montreal who didn't know these acts would never care about them. Lab Synthese was shut down on October 31, 2009, only two years after it was founded, due to evidence from police of crimes such as heavy liquor drinking going on at the venue. Lab Synthese has been compared by Chart Attack to Andy Warhol's Midtown Manhattan-based studio The Factory.

In 2008, Sebastian Cowan was influenced by the concept of Constellation Records to form Arbutus Records as part of the Lab Synthese art collective; the intention of the label was to release music by artists that each had their own individual style of music instead of focusing on issuing records of only one type. In the words of Dazed, the music that has been distributed by Arbutus include the "luminous lullaby techno" works of Blue Hawaii, the "provocative cabaret confessionals" by singer-songwriter Sean Nicholas Savage, energetic sample-heavy music by Airick Woodhead's project Doldrums, and indie group TOPS' "hazy" dream pop; however, they all feel "enchantingly disparate." Silly Kissers, a defunct group whose members included Savage and all the people who would later form TOPS, were labeled by Dazed as an inspiration for the Arbutus acts to experiment with pop music, as well as the ethos of the Montreal scene.

== Recent years ==
Claire Elise Boucher, known by her stage name as Grimes, was one of many artists who learned how to produce music from her acquaintances that were a part of the scene. She, along with Purity Ring and Sean Nicholas Savage, were the first acts to garner critical acclaim on the site Weird Canada in early 2009. Grimes' first two records, Geidi Primes (2010) and Halfaxa (2010) were issued on the Arbutus Records label. The year when her third album, Visions (2012), was issued on the British label 4AD, the DIY scene garnered attention from international listeners. The British newspaper The Telegraph labeled the DIY phenomenon as "the new Brooklyn." Visions was critically acclaimed, was nominated for a 2012 Polaris Music Prize, only losing Feist's Metals. and won Electronic Album of the Year at the Juno Awards of 2013. Also in 2012, Grimes co-hosted the MTV Video Music Awards and was a model for Vogue magazine.

Grimes said in an interview with Spin that she felt uncomfortable living in the Mile End area by the time the DIY scene became popular around the world, feeling the area had become "too social" to the point where it was harder to create material: "Everyone walking by is like, ‘Hey Claire! How’s it going? What’s up?’ and I get knocks on the door all the time." According to Chart Attack, what Grimes said about Mile End in several interviews unknowingly started a competitive atmosphere between artists in the scene, and this led many acts in the culture to worry about the importance of her music. Raphaelle Standell-Preston, frontwoman of the dreamwave group Braids, was one of these artists: "When one of your friends does really well, you’re smiling on the outside, but on the inside you’re thinking ‘Am I not doing something right?’" Caila Thompson-Hannant, known for her project Mozart's Sister, described Montreal as "a really great gestation place. It gracefully straddles the line of being a very happening city for the arts, but still industry doesn’t really come here. There is a level of disdain for it I guess." As of September 2012, Grimes was recording in Los Angeles, California, taking a break from touring and avoiding being interviewed. Mile End, Montreal has gone through gentrification as a result of the DIY scene's popularity.

Tonstartssbandht, Mac DeMarco, Born Gold, Marie Davidson and Elise Barbara, are also considered contributors of the Montreal DIY subculture.

In 2016, a group of musicians formed the collective Making Space: Reflecting on the Limits of Our Scenes, which intends to raise awareness that, according to Cult MTL, "Women, people of colour, disabled people and LGBT communities frequently experience obstacles and discomfort or even outright oppression and danger when navigating [...] [the DIY scene]."

== Characteristics ==
In general, the music of the artists in the DIY scene consists of electronically-produced distortion, "wonky" reverb and a heavy of amount noise. Around 2012, the music that was a part of the subculture was beginning to also include "catchy hooks, slick melodies, and bouncing beats," Spin magazine described.

== See also ==
- Netlabels in Japan, an article about a similar independent music scene in Japan
