= Evan Prosofsky =

Canadian cinematographer

- Born: Canada
- Occupations: Cinematographer; director
- Years active: 2012–present

Evan Prosofsky is a Canadian cinematographer.

== Career ==
Prosofsky began his career in the early 2010s working on music videos, frequently collaborating with director Emily Kai Bock. Notable credits include Grimes’ “Oblivion” (2012), Arcade Fire’s “Afterlife” (2013), Lana Del Rey’s “West Coast” (2014), Lorde’s “Yellow Flicker Beat” (2014), and Paul McCartney’s “Early Days” (2014). He later worked on videos for Florence + the Machine, Mitski, Steve Lacy and M.I.A.

Prosofsky directorial debut was the short documentary Water Park (2013), presented by NOWNESS. As cinematographer, he later worked on the short films A Funeral for Lightning (2016), Möbius (2017), Baton (2018), and Lay Me by the Shore (2022), directed by David Findlay and shot on 35 mm and 65 mm film. In 2025, he served as director of photography on Isaiah Saxon’s fantasy film The Legend of Ochi, produced by A24. He is a member of the Canadian Society of Cinematographers (CSC).

Prosofsky is best known for his early adoption and advocacy for shooting on celluloid. His projects often feature sequences shot on large format 65 mm. His upcoming feature-length debut, the documentary Grand Prairie, is being filmed on 65 mm film.

== Personal life ==
Prosofsky is married to cinematographer and director Emily Kai Bock.

== Selected filmography ==
=== Film ===
- 2025: The Legend of Ochi
- 2022: Lay Me by the Shore
- 2016: A Funeral for Lightning

=== Music video ===
- 2023: Mitski: "My Love Mine All Mine"
- 2022: M.I.A.: "Popular"
- 2022: Steve Lacy: "Mercury"
- 2017: Elton John: "Tiny Dancer"
- 2014: Lorde: "Yellow Flicker Beat"
- 2014: Lana Del Rey: "West Coast"
- 2014: Paul McCartney: "Early Days"
- 2013: Arcade Fire: "Afterlife"
- 2012: Grizzly Bear: "Yet Again"
- 2012: Grimes: "Oblivion"

== Awards and nominations ==
Year	Result	Award	Category	Work	Ref.
2014	Nominated	MTV Video Music Awards	Best Cinematography	Arcade Fire – "Afterlife"	
2014	Nominated	MTV Video Music Awards	Best Cinematography	Lana Del Rey – "West Coast"	
2014	Nominated	Camerimage	Best Cinematography in a Music Video	Paul McCartney – "Early Days"	
2014	Nominated	Canadian Society of Cinematographers Awards	Music video cinematography	Paul McCartney – "Early Days"	
