= Lab Synthèse =

Venue in Montreal, Quebec

Lab Synthèse was an arts collective and venue space in Montreal, Quebec during the late 2000s. It was located at 435 Beaubien Ouest.

Sebastian Cowan, Yan Basque, David Peet and Carlos Chancellor founded the space in 2007 after discovering a 4600 square foot loft in an abandoned textile manufacturing warehouse. One year after its inception David Peet committed suicide, resulting in the departure of Basque and Chancellor from the collective. They were replaced by the painter Ezra Gray, musician Jeff Boyd, film director Emily Kai Bock and musician Alexander Cowan (who later founded Blue Hawaii).

The collective hosted a series of live music concerts, art exhibitions and free weekly film screenings, and grew to become a hub for artists living around the Mile End neighbourhood. The community and concerts surrounding Lab Synthèse led to the founding of Arbutus Records, and helped launch the career of several notable musicians including Grimes, Blue Hawaii, Majical Cloudz, Sean Nicholas Savage, TOPS and BRAIDS. Several members of the collective were also involved in creating the Beaubien zine, which ran three issues and included Emily Kai Bock, Sebastian Cowan and Claire Boucher of Grimes among its editors. After becoming the focus of heavy police attention, which resulted in a series of municipal fines, Sebastian Cowan closed Lab Synthèse in November 2009 to focus full-time on Arbutus Records.
