= A Funeral for Lightning =

- Directed by: Emily Kai Bock
- Written by: Emily Kai Bock
- Produced by: Emily Kai Bock; Lora Criner
- Starring: Annie Williams; Daniel Frazier
- Cinematography: Evan Prosofsky
- Edited by: Emily Kai Bock
- Production company: Epoch Films
- Release date: September 2016 (TIFF)
- Running time: 23 minutes
- Country: Canada
- Language: English

A Funeral for Lightning is a Canadian short drama film, directed by Emily Kai Bock and released in 2016. The film stars Annie Williams as Mandy, a pregnant woman who is becoming disillusioned with her charismatic husband Cornelius's (Daniel Frazier) promises of "a free life" while trapped living off the grid in rural Tennessee.

The film premiered at the 2016 Toronto International Film Festival.

The film was named to TIFF's year-end Canada's Top Ten list for 2016. At the 5th Canadian Screen Awards in 2017, it was a shortlisted nominee for Best Live Action Short Drama. And won the Best Short Fiction Film at the LA Film Festival in 2017.

The name of the work is borrowed from a song title by Doldrums, a Canadian music project which she directed a music video for.
