= Matthew Lessner =

American film director

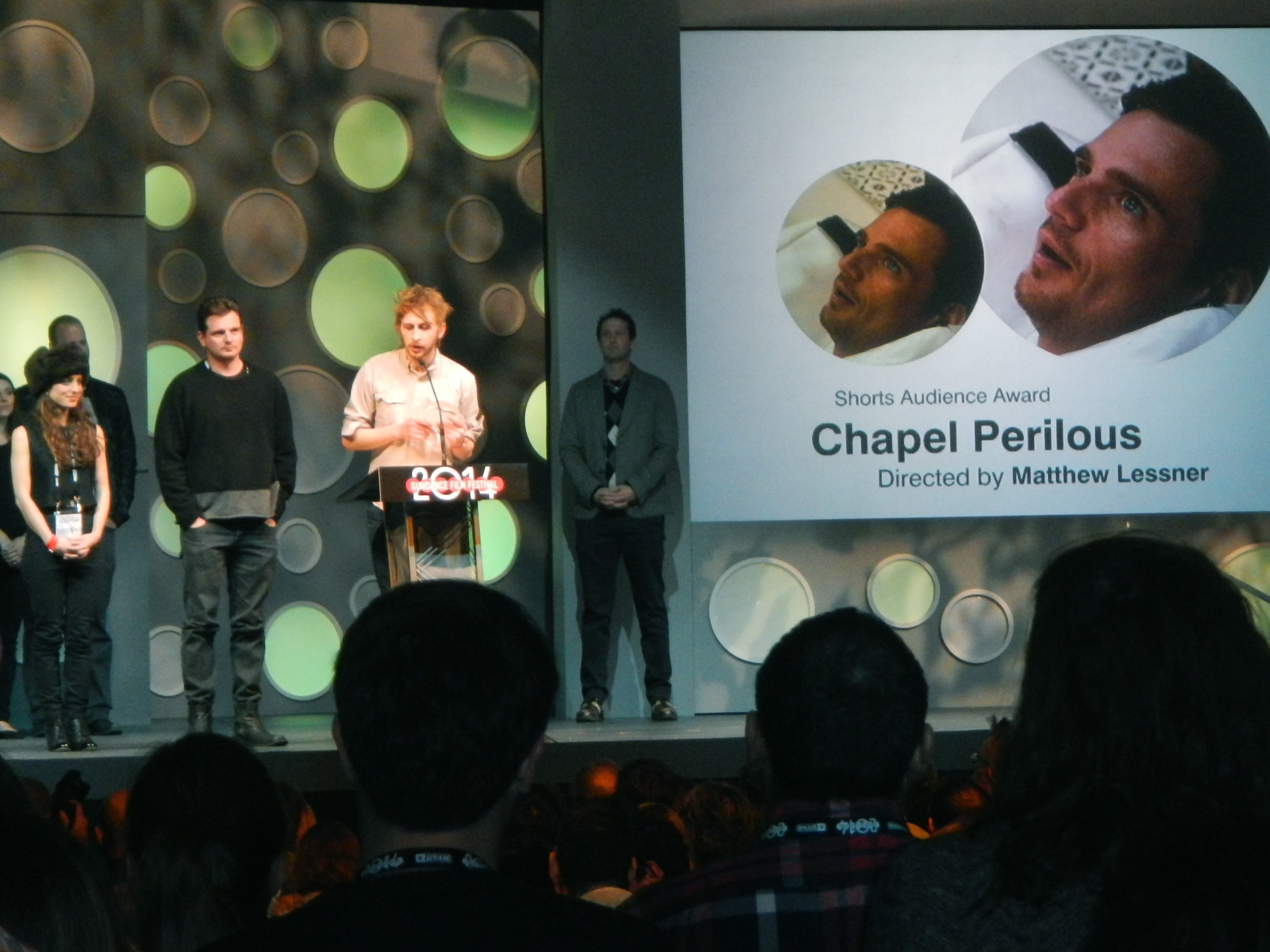
- Matthew Lessner at the Sundance 2014 Awards Ceremony
- Born: Walnut Creek, California
- Occupation: Filmmaker
- Notable work: Chapel Perilous, The Woods, By Modern Measure, Darling Darling, Automatic at Sea

Matthew Lessner is an American artist and independent filmmaker.

== Biography ==
Born in Walnut Creek, California, Lessner was raised in Roseburg, Oregon, where he attended Roseburg High School. He graduated in 2005 from Chapman University, where he studied film.

== Short films ==
Lessner's directorial debut was the 2005 short film Darling Darling starring Michael Cera, which screened at over 30 film festivals worldwide including the Clermont-Ferrand International Short Film Festival, Comedia, and the Ann Arbor Film Festival where Lessner won the Tom Berman Most Promising Filmmaker Award. The film is included on the sixth issue of Wholphin DVD magazine with alternate audio versions by John Cleese and Daniel Handler. Darling Darling was included the Clermont-Ferrand International Short Film Festival's Retrospective 2014: the twenty-first century American short films.

Lessner's second short film, By Modern Measure, premiered at South by Southwest and screened at 30 film festivals including the 2008 Sundance Film Festival. In January 2011 the Sundance Institute released "By Modern Measure" on The YouTube Screening room as part of its Sundance Film Festival Classics series.

His third short film, Chapel Perilous featuring Sun Araw was an official selection at the 2014 Sundance Film Festival where it won the Short Film Audience Award. The film premiered internationally at the Stockholm Film Festival. In March 2014, Chapel Perilous was selected as a Vimeo Staff Pick.

== Feature films ==
In August 2008, Lessner began work on his first feature film The Woods, which was filmed in the woods around Lookingglass, Oregon. The Woods was invited to world premiere at the 2011 Sundance Film Festival. The film made history as the first film to premiere at the Sundance Film Festival that used Kickstarter for production financing. The Woods premiered in New York at the BAMcinemaFest held at the Brooklyn Academy of Music. The Woods premiered internationally at the Cologne Conference in Cologne, Germany.

In August 2011, Lessner was awarded a San Francisco Film Society and Kenneth Rainin Foundation Filmmaking Grant for screenwriting in support of feature film tentatively titled Terror Tuesday. In May 2012, Lessner was awarded an additional San Francisco Film Society and Kenneth Rainin Foundation Filmmaking Grant for development of the feature tentatively titled Terror Tuesday.

In 2017, Lessner released his second feature film Automatic at Sea, which became embroiled in the Pizzagate conspiracy theory prior to its release, resulting in Lessner receiving death threats and being accused of creating coded propaganda for the Clinton Foundation. Werner Herzog called the film "unusual and courageous". Automatic at Sea screened at festivals and theaters worldwide including at the Slamdance Film Festival, the ArcLight Hollywood, the American Film Festival, and the New Hampshire Film Festival where the film won the Narrative Grand Jury Prize.

== Episodic ==
In March 2021, the pilot for Lessner's metaphysical comedy series The Position, world premiered at the South by Southwest Film Festival in the Episodic Pilot Competition.

== Fine art ==
In April 2016, Champis Solutions, a solo installation by Lessner opened at Nevven Gallery in Gothenburg, Sweden. Champis Solutions was Phase Two in the ongoing Seven Phase project titled in Anticipation of the Unexpected.

In late 2018, Lessner was awarded a grant from the Swedish art council Kulturbryggan for the development of an interactive film exhibition entitled SAINT Y2K.

In June 2020, years 3 and 4 of Lessner's ongoing interactive seven year film project In Anticipation of the Unexpected were exhibited at Nevven Gallery in Gothenburg, Sweden.

In the fall of 2020 Lessner's immersive, interactive experience SAINT Y2K opened as a solo exhibition in Stockholm, Sweden.

In January 2023 Lessner's interactive neurofeedback exhibition Hyacinthe opened as a solo exhibition at SKF/Konstnärshuset in Stockholm, Sweden.

== Music videos ==
Lessner has directed over a dozen music videos including for the Dirty Projectors' single "Stillness is the Move" which was ranked one of the best music videos of 2009 by Stereogum. He also directed the video Fool's Gold's "Surprise Hotel".

== Web ==
Lessner directed and produced several videos for BBC Collective with bands including Black Dice and The Fiery Furnaces.

In 2011, Lessner created and directed the web series "Make a Friend" for the French website Konbini.

== Music ==
Lessner contributed lyrics to six of the eight tracks on Lydia Ainsworth's debut album, Right From Real, including "Hologram" which was named Best New Track by Pitchfork The Album was released on Arbutus Records in 2014 and was a shortlist nominee for the Juno Award for the Electronic Album of the Year. Additionally he directed the music video for Ainsworth's single Malachite, which Stereogum voted video of the week in June 2014.

Lessner has collaborated with Cameron Stallones of Sun Araw who contributed a cover of Neil Young's 'Thrasher' to the soundtrack for The Woods. In 2009 they released Sun Araw featuring Matthew Lessner – In Orbit through Stunned Records.

Lessner and his younger sister Sophia Lessner have collaborated on a musical project called Masons. They released their first tape In the Basement of the Temple through Stunned Records in 2008.

== Other work ==
Lessner directed the trailer for Ottessa Moshfegh's 2022 novel Lapvona.

Lessner starred as an actor in the Mia Hansen-Løve film Bergman Island which premiered at the 2021 Cannes Film Festival.

Lessner published an article in Filmmaker (magazine) recounting his experiences with online conspiracy theorists in the lead up to the release of his feature film Automatic at Sea.

Lessner's photographs have been featured in multiple publications including The Sun Magazine and The Wire (magazine).

In the spring of 2008 Lessner worked as an intern for syndicated news program Democracy Now!

== Filmography ==
Year	Title	Format
2005	Darling Darling	Short Film
2007	By Modern Measure	Short Film
2011	The Woods	Feature Film
2013	Chapel Perilous	Short Film
2017	Automatic at Sea	Feature Film
(unknown)	Terror Tuesday	Feature Film
2020	SAINT Y2K	Fine Art (Interactive)
2021	The Position	Episodic (Pilot)

== Music videos ==
Year	Song title	Band	Label
2009	"Set in Stone"	Fires of Rome	The Hours Records
2009	"Set in Stone" M83 Remix	Fires of Rome	The Hours Records
2009	"Stillness is the Move"	Dirty Projectors	Domino Records
2009	"Surprise Hotel"	Fool's Gold	IAMSOUND Records
2009	"Last Dance"	The Raveonettes	Vice Records
2009	"Early Warnings"	Foreign Born	Secretly Canadian
2010	"Forgive Me"	Le Loup	Hardly Art
2010	"World News"	Local Natives	Frenchkiss Records
2010	"Neverest"	Hey Champ	Townie Records
2012	"Marathon Runner"	Yellow Ostrich	Barsuk Records
2014	"Solo Wallet Shuffle"	Sun Araw	Drag City
2014	"Malachite"	Lydia Ainsworth	Arbutus
2024	"Take My Picture (Mops Out Mix)"	Regularfantasy	Behave!

== Other ==
Year	Subject	Title	Format
2010	Dirty Projectors + Björk	Mount Wittenberg Orca I, II, III, V VI	Album Trailers
2011	Explosions in the Sky	"Last Known Surroundings"	Video Installation
2022	Ottessa Moshfegh	"Lapvona"	Novel Trailer
