= Bury the Key =

Studio album by Tops
- Released: August 22, 2025
- Studio: Chic Bébé; Riley's Garage; Treatment Room
- Label: Ghostly International
- Producer: Jane Penny; David Carriere

Tops chronology
I Feel Alive (2020)	Bury the Key (2025)

Bury the Key is the fifth studio album by Canadian band Tops, released on 22 August 2025 by Ghostly International. It is the band's first full-length release since 2020's I Feel Alive and their first on Ghostly International. A 12-track listing was revealed with the announcement and on the band's Bandcamp page.

== Background ==
Press materials describe Bury the Key as a self-produced set written after the group signed to Ghostly International, emphasizing a darker, more "sinister disco" edge while maintaining their sophisti-pop sound. According to the band's Bandcamp notes, the album addresses "feelings once locked away" and weighs happiness, hedonism and self-destruction; although many songs speak through fictional characters, they draw on personal observations of intimacy, toxic behaviour, drug use and apocalyptic dread. During the sessions the group jokingly referred to the shift as "evil Tops", a phrase singer Jane Penny used to describe an effort to better "channel the world around us".

== Release and promotion ==
Tops announced the album alongside the single "Chlorine" on 28 May 2025. Ahead of the announcement, the band released "ICU2" on 30 April 2025, coinciding with news of their signing to Ghostly International. Subsequent singles included "Falling on My Sword" in late June 2025 and "Annihilation" in July 2025. The album was released on 22 August 2025 in multiple formats, including LP, CD, cassette and digital.

== Track listing ==
All tracks are written by Tops.

Bury the Key track listing
No.	Title	Length
1.	"Stars Come After You"	4:20
2.	"Wheels at Night"	2:34
3.	"ICU2"	2:42
4.	"Outstanding in the Rain"	2:55
5.	"Annihilation"	3:22
6.	"Falling on My Sword"	2:27
7.	"Call You Back"	2:11
8.	"Chlorine"	2:41
9.	"Mean Streak"	3:05
10.	"Your Ride"	3:18
11.	"Standing at the Edge of Fire"	2:47
12.	"Paper House"	3:32
Total length:		35:54

== Personnel ==
Credits adapted from the album's liner notes.

=== Tops ===
- David Carriere – performance, production
- Marta Cikojevic – performance
- Riley Fleck – performance
- Jane Penny – performance, production

=== Additional contributors ===
- Marcus Paquin – mixing
- João Carvalho – mastering
- Gilles Castilloux – additional recording
- Robert Beatty – artwork, design

== Release history ==
Region	Date	Label	Format(s)
Worldwide	August 22, 2025	Ghostly International	LP, CD, cassette, digital download/streaming
