= Bermuda Waterfall =

2014 album

Studio album by Sean Nicholas Savage
- Released: May 13, 2014
- Genres: Sophisti-pop; alternative R&B; synthpop; blue-eyed soul
- Length: 38:04
- Label: Arbutus

Sean Nicholas Savage chronology
Other Life (2013)	Bermuda Waterfall (2014)	Other Death (2015)

Professional ratings
Aggregate scores
Source	Rating
Metacritic	74/100
Review scores
Source	Rating
NME	(8/10)
Exclaim!	(8/10)
This Is Fake DIY	4/5 stars
AllMusic	3.5/5 stars

Bermuda Waterfall is a studio album by Canadian singer Sean Nicholas Savage. It was released in May 2014 by Arbutus Records.

== Track listing ==
No.	Title	Length
1.	"Boogie Nights"	1:45
2.	"Naturally"	3:45
3.	"The Rat"	2:12
4.	"Heartless"	3:33
5.	"Empire"	3:15
6.	"Hangin On"	3:14
7.	"Bermuda Waterfall"	4:23
8.	"Darkness"	2:31
9.	"Hands Dance"	2:26
10.	"Please Set Me Free"	3:34
11.	"Vampire"	3:32
12.	"Some Things Never Die"	3:54
