= Tenderness (Blue Hawaii album) =

Studio album by Blue Hawaii
- Released: October 6, 2017
- Length: 44:41
- Label: Arbutus Records

Blue Hawaii chronology
Untogether (2013)	Tenderness (2017)

Professional ratings
Aggregate scores
Source	Rating
Metacritic	78/100
Review scores
Source	Rating
AllMusic	4/5 stars
Clash	7/10
Exclaim!	7/10
Loud and Quiet	7/10
Pitchfork	7.2/10

Tenderness is the second studio album by Canadian electronic music duo Blue Hawaii. It was released on October 6, 2017, through Arbutus Records.

== Track listing ==
No.	Title	Length
1.	"Free at Last"	4:42
2.	"No One Like You"	5:06
3.	"Pregame"	0:19
4.	"Versus Game"	3:52
5.	"Belong to Myself"	3:43
6.	"Prepare for Flight"	0:26
7.	"Younger Heart"	3:30
8.	"Strummin'"	0:36
9.	"Make Love Stay"	4:28
10.	"Big News"	1:08
11.	"Blossoming From Your Shy"	2:50
12.	"Searching for You"	3:44
13.	"Do You Need Me?"	4:25
14.	"Tenderness"	4:02
15.	"Giggles"	0:16
16.	"Far Away Soon"	1:34
