= Sugar at the Gate =

Studio album by TOPS
- Released: June 2, 2017
- Label: Arbutus

TOPS chronology
Picture You Staring (2014)	Sugar at the Gate (2017)	I Feel Alive (2020)

Sugar at the Gate is the third studio album of Canadian indie group TOPS, consisting of vocalist Jane Penny, guitarist David Carriere, drummer Riley Fleck, and bassist Jackson MacIntosh. It was released on June 2, 2017 by Arbutus Records. For making the album, the group lived in Los Angeles in order to have the music reflect experiencing a "teenage fantasy" in the city; it was tracked in a Glendale, California-based mansion named Glamdale.

== Background ==
TOPS' prior work, such as their second album Picture You Staring (2014), had an "isolated" soft, old pop rock sound which the group thought was limited by the fact that they recorded only in Montreal; they weren't sure about what sound and style to go for until they completed performing around 100 shows in 2015. Now, they not only had a sense of how to communicate ideas and perform as a band, but also how to record; the different type of space and minimalism of Sugar at the Gates from prior albums, for instance, was influenced by 1990s R&B.

== Critical reception ==
Professional ratings
Aggregate scores
Source	Rating
Album of the Year	74/100
AnyDecentMusic?	6.8/10
Metacritic	70/100
Review scores
Source	Rating
AllMusic	4/5 stars
Clash	7/10
DIY	3/5 stars
Exclaim!	8/10
God is in the TV	6/10
The Line of Best Fit	7.5/10
Mojo	2/5 stars
NARC Magazine	4.5/5
Now	4/5 stars
Pitchfork	7.4/10

Sugar at the Gate was claimed by NARC Magazine to be TOPS' best album: "The satisfying blend of well-timed chord changes, floating synths and featherlike drum beats create something that handsomely rewards repeated listens, especially on the sunnier days." It was ranked the third best album of 2017 by Gorilla vs. Bear, and the 44th best by Blare magazine. It was also one of the "Favorite Indie Pop and Indie Rock Albums" of AllMusic, which published a review by Marcy Donelson that concluded, "If a touch weightier in tone, the album returns a distinctive palette and home-recorded finish to a heavy-heartedness firmly established on 2014's Picture You Staring, so fans and sentimentalists may take heart." Earbuddy positively described it as a "more alert" Picture You Staring, where "there's a pleasant serenity to some of [the songs] but not without a trickle of ice water down your spine. But in a good way."

The band's continued attention to song craft was a common praise in reviews of Sugar at the Gate, especially for a record in an indie scene where "few young artists even attempt this sort of subtly difficult form of pop" (Kevin Korber of Spectrum Culture) and "DIY sometimes suggests the heedless jettisoning of any frills" (Now's Mark Streeter). Aspects to the craft that were noted included the "well-wrought voices," "well-timed chord changes," restraint, "masterful awareness of space," and "alluring lyricism."

Cole Firth of Exclaim! and Isabella McDonnell of The Line of Best Fit lauded the songs' lyrical perplexity, with its use of mystery and "contrasting and ironic thematic layers" that engage the listener; as McDonnell explained, "Sugar at the Gate, as a whole, is surprisingly cryptic, and slowly allows the budding flower of the album’s meaning to unfurl as the listener makes their way through the release. And yet, the album feels immediately convincing and real: it gives you same excitement as if smelling the freshly cut grass in the first days of summertime. It feels both mysterious and real." According to Sidewalk Hustle, the record "bursts with thoughtful lyrics that pose open-ended questions and stick in the back of the listener’s mind long after the eleven tracks have played out."

In mixed reviews, DIY's Laura Prior appreciated the use of melancholic lyrics and the "indifferent" delivery of them with an upbeat sound and God is in the TV's praised Penny's singing and the record's "few undeniable bangers;" however, both felt it lacked any sort of heaviness to make the music memorable. SoundBlab argued it depended too much on the "mystique and allure of the vocals," resulting in musical compositions that lack direction or a finish line. Mojo dismissed the record as "largely insubstantial," while PressPlayOK felt the band's move towards a sadder tone caused their music to not entice a demographic: "TOPS fans may find themselves alienated in the go-nowhere numbers like Cutlass Cruiser and Hours Between, and newcomers will have switched off long before then."

== Track listing ==
1. Cloudy Skies 04:22

2. Further 03:33

3. Petals 02:54

4. Dayglow Bimbo 02:14

5. Marigold & Gray 04:08

6. Cutlass Cruiser 03:23

7. Hours Between 04:06

8. I Just Wanna Make You Real 03:56

9. Seconds Erase 04:54

10. Topless 02:40
