= Moon King =

Canadian musical artist

- Origin: Toronto, Ontario, Canada
- Genres: Synth-pop, electronic pop, dream pop, indie rock
- Years active: 2012–present
- Label: Arbutus

Moon King is the synth-pop project of Canadian songwriter and producer Daniel Benjamin.

Moon King's music has been described as dream pop, electronic pop or indie rock, incorporating influences from disco, synthpop and house music.

In the early 2010s Daniel performed as a touring drummer with artists including Grimes, Sean Nicholas Savage and Doldrums, while beginning to write and produce his own music.

Fucked Up guitarist Mike Haliechuk released two early 12" EPs, Obsession I and Obsession II, on his label One Big Silence. Performing live with guitarist and vocalist Maddy Wilde, Moon King toured heavily from 2013-2015, supporting artists including Unknown Mortal Orchestra, Austra, TOPS, Majical Cloudz, Mr Twin Sister and Alvvays, and releasing an album, 2015's Secret Life.

At the end of 2015 Daniel relocated to Detroit, Michigan. In 2017 Montreal label Arbutus Records released Hamtramck '16, named for the Detroit-area neighborhood, documenting Moon King's shift towards disco and dance music.

This was followed by 2019's Voice Of Lovers, and The Audition in 2021.

== Discography ==
=== Albums ===
- Secret Life (Last Gang Records, 2015)
- Hamtramck '16 (Arbutus Records, 2017)
- Voice of Lovers (Arbutus Records, 2019)
- The Audition (Arbutus Records, 2021)
- Roses (Arbutus Records, 2024)

=== Singles and EPs ===
- Obsession I (One Big Silence, 2012)
- Obsession II (One Big Silence, 2013)
- I've Stopped Believing/Apartment Fire (Arbutus Records, 2018)
- Voice Of Lovers SOBO Mixes (SOBO Records, 2020)
- Seconds From You with Vespre (Arbutus Records, 2020)
