= Doldrums (disambiguation) =

The doldrums, also called the "equatorial calms", are the calms and light baffling winds at the Intertropical Convergence Zone.

Doldrums may also refer to:

== Music ==
- Doldrums (band), an American post-rock band
- Doldrums (musical project), a Canadian electronic music project
- The Doldrums (album), 2000 album by Ariel Pink
- The Doldrums (EP), 2004 album by Josh Pyke
- "The Doldrums", a song by Billy Woods from Aethiopes (2022)
- Doldrums, a record label of Joy Orbison

== Other ==
- "In the Doldrums", an expression used, particularly in the United Kingdom, to describe somebody as being in low spirits or dull and drowsy.
- The Doldrums, a fictional place in Norton Juster's novel The Phantom Tollbooth (1961)
