= Picture You Staring =

Studio album by TOPS
- Released: September 2, 2014
- Label: Arbutus

TOPS chronology
Tender Opposites (2012)	Picture You Staring (2014)	Sugar at the Gate (2017)

Professional ratings
Aggregate scores
Source	Rating
Album of the Year	75/100
AnyDecentMusic?	7.1/10
Metacritic	80/100
Review scores
Source	Rating
The 405	7.5/10
AllMusic	4/5 stars
DIY	4/5 stars
Dummy	8/10
Earbuddy	6.5/10
Exclaim!	8/10
The Line of Best Fit	8.5/10
Pitchfork	7/10
Pretty Much Amazing	C

Picture You Staring is the second studio album of Canadian indie group TOPS; Dazed debuted the album for streaming on August 28, 2014 before Arbutus Records released it to other formats on September 2, 2014. It was the fourth best album of 2014 according to Gorilla vs. Bear, the seventh best according to Dummy magazine, the 48th best per Stereogum, and 93rd as ranked by Crack Magazine.
