= Chase the Tear =

Single by Portishead
- Released: 10 December 2009
- Genre: Electronic rock
- Length: 5:15
- Label: Amnesty
- Songwriters: Geoff Barrow; Beth Gibbons; Adrian Utley
- Producer: Portishead

Portishead singles chronology
| "Magic Doors" (2008) | "Chase the Tear" (2009) |

"Chase the Tear" is a single by the English band Portishead. It was released in digital format on 10 December 2009, for Human Rights Day to raise money for Amnesty International. It reached number 164 in the UK charts. It was later released as a limited edition 12-inch vinyl single by XL Recordings on 14 November 2011, with all proceeds going to Amnesty International. The 200 signed copies of the vinyl were sold in advance at Independent Label Market on 8 October 2011.

== Live performance ==
The song was performed live on Late Night with Jimmy Fallon on 5 October 2011. It was the group's first U.S. television appearance since 1998.

== Critical reception ==
The song was chosen as Pitchfork's "Best New Track". David Raposa said, "The shockingly simple beat Geoff Barrow bangs out (as you can see in this fantastic video), coupled with the bubbling electronics seething behind it, finds Portishead effortlessly cruising down this particularly overcast stretch of the Autobahn." Peter Gaston of Spin commented that "it's absolutely spellbinding, with a hypnotic analog synth line pulsing beneath Beth Gibbons' spectral vocals — much akin to the vibe of the group's spectacular 2008 album, Third." Meanwhile, Peter Macia of The Fader stated, "It sounds almost nothing like the brutal melancholy of the group's recent Third, and actually doesn't sound like any of their old stuff either." Tim Burrows of The Quietus characterised the song as "OMD-like".

== Track listing ==
12-inch vinyl single

Side A

1. "Chase the Tear" – 5:15

Side B

1. "Chase the Tear (Doldrums Reimagine)" – 5:15

== Personnel ==
Credits adapted from the 12-inch vinyl single's liner notes.

- Portishead – performance (side A), production (side A), mixing (side A)
- Craig Silvey – mixing (side A)
- Stuart Matthews – engineering (side A)
- Rik Dowding – engineering (side A)
- Errhead – performance (side B), production (side B), mixing (side B), engineering (side B)

== Charts ==
| Chart (2011) | Peak position |
|---|---|
| UK Physical Singles (OCC) | 12 |

== Cover version ==
The song was covered by Fotocrime, an American band led by former Coliseum frontman Ryan Patterson. It was included on Fotocrime's 2022 EP of covers, titled Alcoves.
