= Chapel Perilous =

- Film poster
- Directed by: Matthew Lessner
- Written by: Matthew Lessner
- Produced by: James Alefantis; Vanessa Gazy; David Henry Gerson
- Starring: Kris Park; David Gerson; Bobby McGee
- Cinematography: Paul Gleason
- Music by: Sun Araw
- Production company: Caesura Media
- Release dates: November 7, 2013 (Stockholm); January 17, 2014 (Sundance)
- Running time: 13 minutes
- Country: United States
- Language: English

Chapel Perilous is a 2013 comedy fantasy short film, directed by Matthew Lessner. The film had its premiere at the 2013 Stockholm International Film Festival on November 7, 2013. The film was screened at the 2014 Sundance Film Festival on January 17, 2014, where it won the Audience Award.

== Plot ==
A door-to-door salesman, Robbin pays an unexpected visit to Levi Gold. This visit makes Levi confront his true mystical calling, as well as the nature of reality itself.

== Cast ==
- Kris Park as Robbin
- David Henry Gerson as Levi Gold
- Bobby McGee as Dennis
- Sun Araw as himself
- Alina Aliluykina as Cleopatra

== Reception ==
Film Pulse scored the film 7.5 out of 10 and said, "Chapel Perilous is the type of short film that leaves you wanting more by the end. It doesn't lay all its cards on the table, and only gives you the bare minimum amount of information. The viewer is left to draw his or her own conclusions about the craziness that just transpired, but I can't help but think how much fun this could be as a feature film." Scott Beggs of Film School Rejects praised the film by saying that "it explores some radical, hilarious territory while grabbing you by the jaw. A literal crowd pleaser".

== Accolades ==
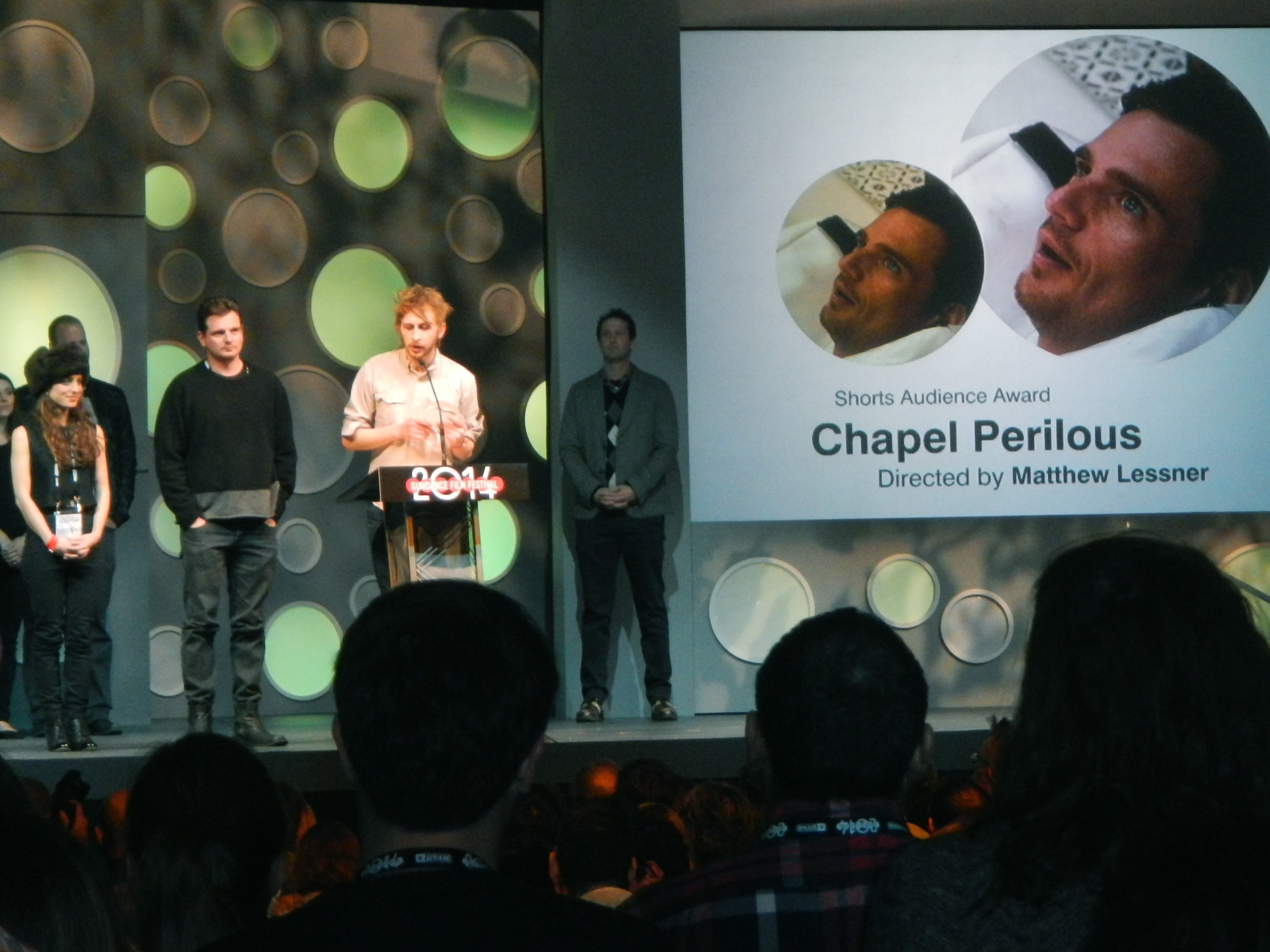
Chapel Perilous won the Short Film Audience Award at the 2014 Sundance Film Festival.

| Year | Award | Category | Recipient | Result |
|---|---|---|---|---|
| 2014 | Sundance Film Festival | Short Film Grand Jury Prize | Matthew Lessner | Nominated |
| 2014 | Sundance Film Festival | Short Film Audience Award | Matthew Lessner | Won |
