= Michael Stasis =

- Origin: Los Angeles, United States
- Genres: Indie, Lo-fi, punk rock, pop, indie pop, country, outsider music
- Years active: 1999-Present
- Labels: Arbutus Records

Michael Stasis is the musical project of Michael Bostock (born September 26, 1986). Born and raised in Pennsylvania, he now lives and records in Los Angeles. He has been writing and recording songs since age 13, and has accumulated a catalogue of over 200 tracks. In 2009, Bostock graduated from Cooper Union in New York City with a Bachelor of Fine Arts. There he entered a work-study relationship with music producer Jorge Elbrecht, known for his work in Lansing-Dreiden and Ariel Pink. This relationship has been credited as being a key point in the artist's development. On August 7, 2015 Arbutus Records issued a compilation of Michael Stasis titled "RIP III".

== Discography ==
=== Studio LPs ===
- 2016: Gentle Cycle (Arbutus Records)
- 2014: Venus Of Soap
- 2012: Chainsaw
- 2009: Anger (Natural Resources)
- 2009: Cassette (Natural Resources)

=== Studio EPs ===
- 2012: My First Bootleg
- 2011: In The Shadow Of The Dairy Queen
- 2011: Innernet Blues

=== Compilations ===
- 2018: RIP IV
- 2015: RIP III (2006-2014) (Arbutus Records)
- 2014: RIP II (2010-2014) (Ultrasoft)
- 2010: RIP (2003-2009)
