= Independent Label Market =

Open market for record labels

The Independent Label Market is an open market founded by Joe Daniel and Katie Riding that provides a venue for the proprietors of over 160 independent record labels to sell their products to the public. The market also provides an opportunity for listeners to meet the founders of record labels and some of the artists.

== History ==
The Independent Label Market was first set up in May 2011 on Berwick Street, London, United Kingdom, and has since returned twice a year to Old Spitalfields Market. The market is held in conjunction with the London Brewers Market.

The market also launched in Brooklyn, New york in October 2011, Silverlake, Los Angeles in November 2012, Toronto in June 2013. and Glasgow in October 2013.

Some of the labels that take part in the market include Rough Trade, Mute, XL, Domino, Fabric, 4AD, DFA Records, Angular Records, R&S, Infectious, Bella Union and Fool's Gold. Notable appearances at the market's stalls include Diplo, Gilles Peterson, Coldcut, Daniel Miller, Simon Raymonde, Erol Alkan, Tim Burgess and Edwyn Collins.

Many recordings on vinyl are to be found at the market stalls. As well, some artists have made special releases available exclusively at the various markets. Some examples of these have been: 200 signed copies of Portishead’s ‘Chase the Tear’ 12” where all profits from the sales went to Amnesty International, Young Turks auction of the only copy of a Jamie xx remix of Radiohead’s ‘Bloom’, Richard Russell’s 20 hand-made rave/grime/garage/jungle/dubstep mixtapes for the XL stall, and the only signed copy of Elton John’s “Are You Ready For Love” on pink, half speed cut 220gsm vinyl.

=== 2021 ===
In November 2021, ILM marked its tenth anniversary with a winter event at Coal Drops Yard in King’s Cross on 27 November, celebrating “a decade of pop up events aimed at DJs and vinyl collectors” .

=== 2022 ===
The following year, two winter editions were announced:

- London: 12 November at Coal Drops Yard.
- Manchester: 19 November at New Century, as part of Tim Burgess’ Vinyl Adventures.

== Labels ==
The labels that have taken part in the markets are:

- !K7
- 100% Silk
- 4AD
- Accidental
- Acid Jazz
- AED
- Amok
- Angular
- Anti-
- Anticon
- Arts & Crafts
- Because
- Beggars Group
- Believe
- Bella Union
- Best Before
- Big Dada
- Borstal Beat
- Brownswood
- Brushfire Records
- Burger Records
- Captured Tracks
- Caught By The River
- Chemikal Underground
- Chess Club
- Critical Heights
- Cool Summer Records
- Dangerbird
- Dead Oceans
- Delicious Vinyl
- Dirtybird
- DFA Records
- Different
- Dine Alone Records
- DJ History
- Domino
- Double Six
- Double Denim Records
- Eenie Meenie Records
- Everloving Records
- Fabric
- Faux Discs
- Fat Cat Records
- Fear And Records
- Feraltone
- Fierce Panda
- Fika
- Fire Records
- Fool's Gold
- Fortuna Pop!
- Friends Of Friends
- Frontier
- Full Time Hobby
- GETME!
- Goaty Tapes
- Gringo
- Ground Level
- Hand Drawn Dracula
- Heavenly
- Highline
- Hingefinger
- Hit City USA
- Hospital
- Hottwerk
- Houndstooth
- House Anxiety
- Hydra Head
- IAMSOUND
- Indoor Shoes
- Infectious
- Late Night Tales
- Les Disques du Crepuscule
- Lex
- Lojinx
- Loose Music
- Lucky Number
- LuvLuvLuv
- Mad Decent
- Mais Um Discos
- Manimal Vinyl
- Maple Music
- Matador
- Memphis Industries
- Merok
- Mexican Summer
- Minimal Wave
- Mono Prism
- Monotreme
- Moshi Moshi
- Mute
- Nevado
- Night Time Stories
- Ninja Tune
- No Kings
- Not Not Fun
- Now Again Records
- NPIP
- O Genesis
- Oddbox Records
- Om
- One Little Indian
- Origami
- Out of Sound
- Outside Music
- Paper Bag
- Peacefrog
- Permanent Records
- Phantasy Sound
- Innovative Leisure
- Jagjaguwar
- Kanine
- Kartel
- Killing Moon Ltd
- Laissez Faire Club
- Last Gang
- Leaf
- PIAS
- Pink Mist
- Planet Mu
- Proville
- R&S
- Rekids
- Rinse
- Robot Elephant
- Rocket Girl
- Rough Trade
- Roundtable
- Sacred Bones
- Secretly Canadian
- Something In Construction
- Song By Toad
- Sonic Cathedral
- Soul Jazz
- Soundway
- Southern Fried
- State51
- Static Clang
- Stolen Records
- Stones Throw
- Stranger Recordings
- Strut
- Sunday Best
- Swamp 81
- Tape Club
- Tempa
- Terrible Records
- Throne Of Blood
- Tough Love
- Transgressive
- Transparent
- Tri-Angle
- Trilogy
- True Panther
- Upset The Rhythm
- Wall Of Sound
- Warp
- Weird World
- What's Your Rupture?
- White Iris
- Wierd Records
- Williams Street Records
- Wonderfulsound
- WIAIWYA
- XL
- Xtra Mile
- ZZK Records
