= I Feel Alive (album) =

Studio album by TOPS
- Released: April 3, 2020
- Studio: Hotel 2 Tango (Montreal); Studio Toute Garni (Montreal); Arbutus Record (Montreal); Parc-Ex Tone Jail (Montreal); Fenster Studio (Berlin); Redbull Studio (Berlin)
- Genre: Dream pop; indie pop; power pop; soft rock
- Length: 35:13
- Label: Arbutus
- Producer: Jane Penny; Davie Carriere

TOPS chronology
| Sugar at the Gate (2017) | I Feel Alive (2020) |

Singles from I Feel Alive
- 1. "I Feel Alive" Released: January 22, 2020; 2. "Witching Hour" Released: February 12, 2020; 3. "Colder & Closer" Released: March 4, 2020; 4. "Direct Sunlight" Released: March 25, 2020

Professional ratings
Aggregate scores
| Source | Rating |
|---|---|
| Album of the Year | 71/100 |
| AnyDecentMusic? | 6.7/10 |
| Metacritic | 72/100 |
Review scores
| Source | Rating |
| AllMusic | 4/5 stars |
| Clash | 7/10 |
| Cult MTL | 8/10 |
| DIY | 3.5/5 stars |
| Exclaim! | 7/10 |
| The Guardian | 4/5 stars |
| musicOMH | 3/5 stars |
| Pitchfork | 6.7/10 |
| Q | 3/5 stars |
| Under the Radar | 7/10 |

I Feel Alive is the fourth studio album by Canadian indie pop band, TOPS. The album was released on April 3, 2020.

== Track listing ==
I Feel Alive track listing
| No. | Title | Length |
|---|---|---|
| 1. | "Direct Sunlight" | 3:28 |
| 2. | "I Feel Alive" | 2:34 |
| 3. | "Pirouette" | 3:06 |
| 4. | "Ballads & Sad Movies" | 3:29 |
| 5. | "Colder & Closer" | 3:05 |
| 6. | "Witching Hour" | 3:13 |
| 7. | "Take Down" | 2:43 |
| 8. | "Drowning in Paradise" | 2:59 |
| 9. | "OK Fine Whatever" | 3:30 |
| 10. | "Looking to Remember" | 2:50 |
| 11. | "Too Much" | 4:21 |
| Total length: | | 35:13 |

Japanese edition (bonus track)
| No. | Title | Length |
|---|---|---|
| 12. | "Freeze Frame" |

== Personnel ==
- Producer – Jane Penny and Davie Carriere
- Mixing – Chris Coady
- Mastering – Greg Calbi
- Additional credits – Sebastian Cowan, Bronwyn Ford, Adam Byczkowski, John Moods, JJ Weihl, Austin Tufts, Shae Brossard

== Charts ==
| Chart (2020) | Peak position |
|---|---|
| US Top Current Albums (Billboard) | 83 |

== In popular culture ==
The title track, “I Feel Alive”, is briefly featured in the 2025 film Eddington.
