= Everything Outside =

2018 Canadian drama film

- Directed by: David Findlay
- Written by: David Findlay; Derin Emre
- Produced by: Dominique Dussault; David Findlay
- Starring: Louise Portal; Ahmed Muslimani; Kati Outinen
- Cinematography: Blake Davey
- Edited by: David Findlay
- Music by: Sam Tudor
- Production company: Nemesis Films
- Distributed by: La Distributrice de films
- Release date: September 16, 2018 (FCVQ)
- Running time: 86 minutes
- Country: Canada
- Language: English

Everything Outside is a Canadian drama film, written and directed by David Findlay and released in 2018. The film stars Louise Portal as Louise, a painter who arrives to spend some vacation time at her friends' cottage in the rural Quebec countryside, and Ahmed Muslimani as Ahmed, a Lebanese Canadian actor from Toronto who unexpectedly arrives at the cottage claiming to have also been invited to stay there by the same friends.

The cast also includes Kati Outinen, Sylvain Buffoni, Eve Duranceau, Véronique Beaudet, Sarah Beauchemin, Blaise Tardif, Thiéry Dubé, Éloïsa Laflamme-Cervantes, Marilie St-Onge, Grégoire Hamel, Catherine Beauchemin, Marc-Antoine Johnson, Guillaume Moreau and Cameron Brodeur in supporting roles.

The film premiered at the 2018 Quebec City Film Festival, and was screened at the 2018 Vancouver International Film Festival, before going into commercial release in April 2019.
