= Babycastles =

Game developer collective and space

- Interactive map of Babycastles
- Address: 145 W. 14th Street
- Location: New York City
- Coordinates: 40°44′18.3″N 73°59′55.5″W

Website
- babycastles.com

Babycastles is an indie game development collective, arcade, and art space in New York City.

== Programming ==
The Babycastles arcade was designed to give independent game developers a public place to show their projects, and to establish such games as a social culture for New York City. The arcade was originally co-located with the music venue Silent Barn in Queens. On most nights each week, the Babycastles basement arcade of indie and amateur video games opened during music shows upstairs. The space was open for those who paid for entrance to the upstairs show. The arcade's several games and their curators rotated on a monthly basis and were set in scavenged, do-it-yourself arcade cabinets. The New York Times likened it to "a 1970s rec room reimagined by hackers". In its last Manhattan space, it remained closer in configuration to a DIY punk space than an art gallery.

The venue has hosted a recurring video game tournament called Hot Ronny's Rumble. Other events and exhibitions include the 2014 book release for Julian Assange's When Google Met WikiLeaks and the 2016 "Yo Fight My Mans", curated by Ashok Kondabolu and including five weeks of art installations, live DJs, panel discussions, and a custom fighting video game.

== History ==
Salahuddin and Gupta on the history of Babycastles

Kunal Gupta and Syed Salahuddin started the Babycastles collective in 2009 in the basement of Silent Barn, a Ridgewood, Queens, cooperative performance space where Gupta lived. Following a robbery in mid-2011 and closure by zoning violations, a search began for a new space, which they opened in May 2013 in Bushwick, Brooklyn. Babycastles opened in Chelsea, Manhattan, on 14th Street in 2014. The owner of its building specifically sought to rent it to artists. Babycastles chose the location based on its equal proximity to New York's five boroughs.
