= Lay Me by the Shore =

2022 Canadian short drama film

- Directed by: David Findlay
- Written by: David Findlay
- Produced by: Joaquin Cardoner
- Starring: Isla Pouliot; Kai Smith
- Cinematography: Evan Prosofsky
- Edited by: Alexander Farah
- Music by: Ola Fløttum
- Production company: Asymetric
- Release date: February 14, 2022 (Berlin)
- Running time: 19 minutes
- Country: Canada
- Language: English

Lay Me by the Shore is a 2022 Canadian short drama film, written and directed by David Findlay. Acted by a cast of non-professional teen actors, the film stars Isla Pouliot as Noah, a transgender teenager trying to navigate his grief over the death of his best friend in an accident as he completes his final months of high school.

Its cast also includes Kai Smith, Aslan Campbell, Gwenna Cooper, Christopher Evans, Nicky Lee Evans, Vivi Harder and Brennan Smart.

The film premiered in the Generation14Plus program at the 72nd Berlin International Film Festival, and had its Canadian premiere at the 2022 Toronto International Film Festival.

The film was named to TIFF's annual year-end Canada's Top Ten list for 2022.

In 2025 Findlay began production on a feature-length expansion of the film, starring Harris Lowe, Violet Dolejsi and Sean Harris.
