= Doldrums (musical project) =

Doldrums is the musical identity of Canadian singer, producer and visual artist Airick Asher Woodhead. Doldrums began in 2010 as a moniker to release home recordings before expanding into a live band and releasing three LPs: Lesser Evil (2013) on Arbutus Records, The Air Conditioned Nightmare (2015) on Sub Pop records, and Esc (2017) on Endless.

== History ==
Doldrums began in 2010 at The House of Everlasting Superjoy, a DIY venue and warehouse living space in Toronto that Airick shared with members of the group DD/MM/YYYY, which he cites as a primary influence, along with the numerous American noise artists that the venue hosted. The first release was a VHS of videos and music that had been chopped up and collaged together, choosing the name Doldrums after the book The Phantom Tollbooth by Norton Juster, a childhood favourite of his.

A cover of Portishead's "Chase the Tear" brought Doldrums attention after Portishead chose to include it as the B-side to the vinyl release, a charity release for Amnesty International on XL Recordings. Cult UK label No Pain in Pop released his EP Empire Sound that year, which consisted of material from the Parrot Talk VHS. In Montreal Airick collaborated with artists within the burgeoning electronic music scene centred around Arbutus Records, which Pitchfork described as a group whose "sounds may be disparate, but [are] united by their desire to tackle questions of identity from unique and exciting perspectives."

Montreal-based artist Grimes discovered Doldrums and invited him to move to Montreal in 2011. Her single "Oblivion" was inspired by Airick, and he was featured on her album Visions. The two embarked on a tour of DIY venues in America including Silent Barn in NYC, the Copy Cat in Baltimore, Secret Squirrel in Athens and the Magic Stick in Detroit.

Doldrums' first LP Lesser Evil was released on Arbutus on February 25, 2013. The album was well received, being described by Spin critic Philip Sherburne as a "crazy quilt" of the Beach Boys, Animal Collective, OMD and Dan Deacon that has "been tie-dyed, batiked, beaded, bedazzled, and sliced up into ticker tape for good measure". The band toured extensively in promotion of the album, supporting artists Crystal Castles and Purity Ring as well as playing headlining shows and festivals. Black Dice, another key early influence on Doldrums' music, remixed the single "She Is the Wave". The band played 11 shows at the SXSW music festival in Austin in 5 days.

In 2015 Sub Pop Records announced the release of Doldrums' second album The Air Conditioned Nightmare, marking the band's departure from Arbutus. The group headlined tours in America and Europe and played OFF festival in Poland. Following a live performance on Boiler Room TV the band's van was broken into and laptop, passport and other equipment stolen, resulting in the cancellation of a European tour with the band HEALTH and forcing Airick to stay in Canada, a period which he described as a "wake up call", due to the things he was doing being "emotionally unsustainable".

In July 2017 the new album Esc appeared, along with the video and single "Runner Up".

In April 2021, Woodhead announced on Instagram that he would be retiring the name ‘Doldrums.’ In the same post, he launched a new project ‘Crasher’ a punk band formed with friends during the COVID-19 lockdown.

== Musical style ==
Doldrums' music has been described as occupying the middle ground between noise and pop, and as 'post-internet' as it makes use of a wide variety of styles and is created primarily by collaging samples together, with added live drumming and percussion. Woodhead's voice has been described as androgynous, or countertenor As a lyricist he has written about the changing relationship of humans to their machines and each other, weaving together psychedelic and surrealist imagery to create character narratives.

== Live ==
Live members of the live band have included Petra Glynt on drums, Steven Foster on drums, Kyle Jukka on samples, Guy Dallas on synth, and Airick's brother Daniel Woodhead (from the band Moon King) on drums. The live band is known for chaotic performances involving extended live-improvisation jams by the musicians and encouraging dancing, audience participation and crowd surfing. In October 2017 Glynt released the solo album This Trip.

== Discography ==
Albums

- Lesser Evil (Arbutus Records, Souterrain Transmissions, 2013)
- A Very Doldrums Christmas (Digital, 2014)
- The Air Conditioned Nightmare (Sub Pop, 2015)
- Esc (Endless, 2017)

Extended plays

- Empire Sound (No Pain in Pop, 2011)
- Egypt (Arbutus Records, Souterrain Transmissions, 2012)

Singles

- "Euphoria / Strange Waves" 7" (We Are Busy Bodies, 2010)
- "aHundred" 7" (We Are Busy Bodies, Split w DD/MM/YYYY, 2011)
- "IDONTWANNABEDELETED" 7" (featuring Samantha Urbani) (Sub Pop, 2015)

Videos

- Parrot Talk VHS (Ministry of Truth, 2010)
