= Lydia Ainsworth =

- Origin: Toronto, Ontario, Canada
- Genres: Electronic, experimental, indie, film score
- Years active: 2013–present
- Label: Arbutus Records
- Website: www.lydiaainsworth.com

Lydia Miriam Ainsworth is a Canadian composer, producer and singer based in Toronto. She has released four albums, the Juno-nominated Right From Real, Darling of the Afterglow, Phantom Forest, and Sparkles & Debris.

== Early life and education ==
Ainsworth was born in Toronto to a singer-songwriter father and a set designer mother. She began learning cello at age 10 and attended the Etobicoke School of the Arts as a teenager. She completed a Bachelor's degree in music composition at McGill University and was named an Emerging Artist by the Canada Council for the Arts in 2008. She moved to New York City to complete a Master's degree in music composition on a grant at New York University.

== Career ==
Ainsworth began composing for student films while at McGill University, and in 2011 she composed the score for the film The Woods directed by Matthew Lessner. She began recording her first album, Right from Real, in her New York apartment, but completed the album in Toronto. The album was released in September 2014 by Montreal-based independent label Arbutus Records; in 2015 it was a nominee for the Juno Award for the Electronic Album of the Year. In 2016, she was named by CBC Music as one of "6 Canadian female producers you need to know."

Ainsworth released a video, "Afterglow" in February 2017, in advance of her second album, Darling of the Afterglow, which was released in March that year.

In March 2021, Ainsworth announced her fourth album, Sparkles & Debris, which was released on May 21, 2021.

== Discography ==
- 2014 - Right from Real
- 2017 - Darling of the Afterglow
- 2019 - Phantom Forest
- 2021 - Sparkles & Debris
