= Sun Araw =

Musician

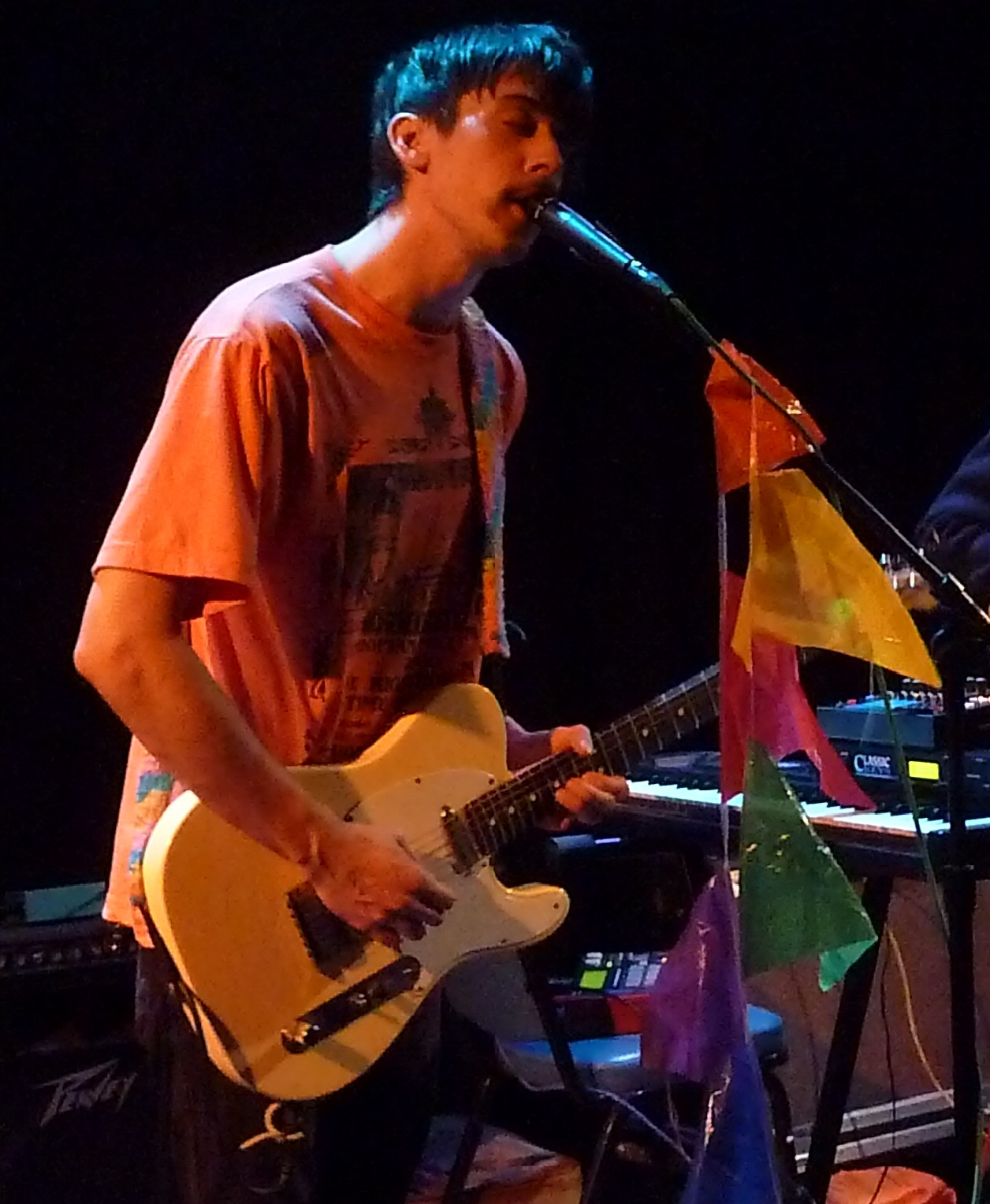
- Performing live in March 2011

Background information
- Also known as: Prince Sunarawma, Aristocrat P. Child, DJ Si Si Si Gracias
- Born: Cameron Stallones; Austin, Texas, United States
- Origin: Austin, Texas, United States
- Genres: Neo-psychedelia; hypnagogic pop; experimental
- Years active: 2007–present
- Labels: Not Not Fun, Woodsist, Sun Ark Records, Thrill Jockey, Gotta Let It Out, Keroxen, MIDA, Goodfellas, Mental Groove Records, RVNG. Intl, Monofonous Press
- Formerly of: Magic Lantern, Vibes, Pocahaunted, Celebrate Music Synthesizer Group, Duppy Gun
- Website: sunaraw.com

Cameron Stallones, better known as Sun Araw, is an American musician. Previously a member of the band Magic Lantern, he has released several albums of experimental music, including a collaboration with Jamaican reggae group The Congos. He has also worked as part of the Not Not Fun label 'supergroup' Vibes.

== Biography ==
Originally from Austin, Texas, Stallones now resides in Long Beach, California. Stallones was associated with the Not Not Fun record label, and released his debut album, The Phynx, in February 2008. This was followed by the release of a second album, Beach Head, in July of the same year. He has been prolific since then, having released fourteen subsequent albums between 2009 and 2024. Stallones also collaborated with Pocahaunted on the Passage album.

In 2010, Stallones set up his Sun Ark studio and label in his Long Beach home, where he records most of his music.

His 2012 collaboration with M. Geddes Gengras and The Congos Icon Give Thank reached number seven on the Billboard Top World Albums chart. Sun Araw and The Congos also performed live together.

== Name ==
Araw is a Tagalog word meaning 'sun' or 'day', depending on context, meaning Stallones' stage name literally translates to sun sun. However, as Stallones recounted to LA Weekly, he considers his name to mean "sun day", which is a pun referring to Sunday, and more specifically the Christian Sabbath day. Therefore, Stallones considers his stage name to mean "sacred rest". One justification for this he provided was that he participates for a time in many bands—but his one man show Sun Araw is something he can always rely on when he takes a break from other music projects.

== Musical style ==
His 2010 album Off Duty was described by Allmusic writer Gregory Heaney as "pulsing, Krautrock-influenced retro-futuristic lo-fi." Critics David Keenan and Simon Reynolds grouped him with an early wave hypnagogic pop artists who emerged in the late 2000s. Jon Pareles, writing for The New York Times, described Sun Araw's music as "a happy jungle of electronic repetition and live playing. Loops and echoes reconfigured reggae, funk and Afrobeat in dizzying ways; the music cackled and hopped, ready to trip up dancers or just get trippy in decidedly 21st-century groove".

His style has been characterized as experimental, containing "sampled loops, echoed vocals, bursting bass, and random moments". His music has also been described as "neo-dub" and "psych-rock".

With releases like Icon Give Thank in 2012, it is described by Andy Beta of Pitchfork as a "psychedelic gospel album". Furthermore, tracks like "Thanks and Praise" are described as "beyond dub, dancehall, roots, (his previous release) Ancient Romans, never really sounding like... the aforementioned genres". This "psychedelic" flavour to his music can be found in other release such as On Patrol or Off Duty.

== In popular culture ==
- The tracks "Harken Sawshine", "Horse Steppin", as well as an original cover of Neil Young's "Thrasher" were featured in the 2011 independent feature film The Woods written and directed by Matthew Lessner.
- The tracks "Horse Steppin" and "Deep Cover" were featured in the 2012 video game Hotline Miami.
- Sun Araw stars in the 2013 short film Chapel Perilous, written and directed by Matthew Lessner, which won the Audience Award at the 2014 Sundance Film Festival.

== Discography ==
=== Studio albums ===
- The Phynx (2008), Not Not Fun
- Beach Head (2008), Not Not Fun
- Heavy Deeds (2009), Not Not Fun
- On Patrol (2010), Not Not Fun
- Night Gallery (2011), Thrill Jockey - with Eternal Tapestry
- Ancient Romans (2011)
- Icon Give Thank (2012), RVNG Intl - with M. Geddes Gingras and The Congos, released with the Icon Eye film in the FRKWYS series
- The Inner Treaty (2012)
- Belomancie (2014)
- Gazebo Effect (2015)
- Professional Sunflow (2016), W.25TH - with Laraaji
- The Saddle of the Increate (2017)
- Guarda in alto (Movie soundtrack) (2018), Goodfellas
- Rock Sutra (2020)
- Fantasias for Violin & Guitar (2020), MIDA - with Maarja Nuut
- Lifetime (2024)

All released by Sun Ark Records unless stated.

=== EPs ===
- Boat Trip (2008), Woodsist
- Leaves Like These (2009)
- In Orbit (2009), Stunned Records - with Matthew Lessner
- Off Duty (2010), Woodsist
- Major Grotto (2010)
- Sun Ark Prayer Tapes Vol. 1 (2012)
- Sun Ark Prayer Tapes Vol. 2 (2012)
- Music from Harvester (movie soundtrack) (2015) - with Nicholas Malkin
- 21.09.15 (2016), Otoroku - with Orphy Robinson
- Adventures In Object-Hood! ("Music From The Great Link") (2018), Ikuisuus - with Noel Meek
- DX "CLASSICS" (2019)
- Cetacean Sensation (2022, physical release by Discrepant)
- Rapid Response (2026)

All released by Sun Ark Records unless stated.

Both Sun Ark Prayer Tapes had a combined physical tape release by Briefield Flood Press, under Sun Ark Prayer Tapes 1 & 2.

=== Singles ===
- Hey Mandala! (2008), Not Not Fun
- Sun Ark (2010), Not Not Fun
- Houston Abstros (2011), Monofonus Press
- I'm Gonna Cross That River Of Jordan (2012), released by The Great Pop Supplement - with Spacemen 3
- Sun Araw / Ralph White (2013), Monofonous Press
- Fluid Array (2019) - with Mitchell Brown
- VHW7 (2021) - with Tomo Jacobson
- Hydrombule / Lifetime (2024)
- Proper (2026)

All released by Sun Ark Records unless stated.

=== Live Albums ===
- Livephreaxxx!!!! (2010), Leaving Records - with Matthewdavid
- Activated Clown (2019), NNA Tapes
- AQUA X: Super Coracle / Tarzana Split (2023), Keroxen - with Tarzana
- La Solo (2023)

All released by Sun Ark Records unless stated.

=== DJ Mixes ===
- Super Slayerss (2010)
- Meteor Hits 2013 (2010), Rose Quartz
- MMX (2011), Opening Ceremony
- Got To Get Over! (Parts 1 & 2) (2011), Where's Yr Child - VS. Heatwave
- Dummy Mix 98 (2011), Dummy Mix
- He Who Carved The Crater Created The Key (2011), Dublab
- Open: This Is The Literature - Disco Hermetics (2012), Dublab - VS. Heatwave
- Forget Our Fates (2014), Sun Ark Edit Bay - with "DJ Purple Image (Alex Gray)"

All released by Sun Ark Records unless stated.

== Live bands ==
Sun Araw, despite being Cameron's solo project, is often played live with others in band or trio combinations.

This is often named as the "Sun Araw Band", but there are exceptions. These are usually numbered ascending from 1 upwards, written in Roman Numerals. This number change often occurs when the members change, but there are exceptions.

Band formations are listed with a list of members along with their role (where available), as well as credited releases.

=== Sun Araw Band V ===
Releases:

- Formatting Formants: Brisbane (2012)
- Formatting Formants: Adelaide (2012)

=== Sun Araw Band IX ===
Releases:

- Two From The Desert: Yucca Valley (2012)

=== Sun Araw Band X ===
Releases:

- Live ROMA (2013) - with Dracula Lewis

=== S. Araw Trio XI ===
- Cameron Stallones - Guitar
- Alex Gray - Synthesizers
- Mitchell Brown - Drums

Releases:

- Gazebo Effect (2015)

=== Sun Araw Band XII ===
- J. Leland - Congas, percussion
- Alex Gray - Computer synthesis, bamboo saxophone
- Cameron Stallones - Synthesizers, MIDI guitar

Releases:

- Live in Oto (2015)
- Live in Oslo (2015)
- Live Kraniche Bei Den Elbbrücken (2016), Hafenschlamm Rekords

Live Kraniche Bei Den Elbbrücken is credited to Sun Araw Band XII, despite not sharing the same members or instrumental roles. This variation of members is listed below:

- Cameron Stallones - Synth, guitar, voice
- "J. Gray" - Percussion
- J. Leland - Synth, bamboo saxophone

=== S. Araw Trio XIII ===
- Cameron Stallones - MIDI Guitar, synthesizers, vocals
- J. Leland - MIDI Drums, percussion
- T. Jacobson - "MIDI Ribbon"

Releases:

- Antwerp (2016)
- Warsaw (2016)

=== S. Araw Trio / Band XV ===
- Cameron Stallones - Guitar, synthesizers
- M. Riordan - Synthesizers
- J. Leland - "VDrums", percussion

Releases:

- Jupiter Wilson (2017)
- Hot Tub in Tallinn! (2018)

=== Sun Araw Band Ensemble (2017) ===
- Cameron Stallones - Guitar, synthesizer
- M. Riordan - Synthesizer
- R. Magill - Saxophone (unspecified)
- C. Mitchell - Percussion, "pocket trumpet"

Releases:

- Live At Zebulon (2017)

=== Sun Araw Duo XVI (2024) ===
- Cameron Stallones - Synthesis, drum program, midi-guitar
- M. Riordan - Yamaha Portasound-470, bass synthesizer

Release:

- LA DUO (2024)

All Sun Araw Live Band releases are released by Sun Ark Records unless otherwise stated.

== Music aliases ==
Cameron Stallones, over the course of his career, has also made music under several aliases other than Sun Araw. These aliases define either solo releases, or group projects.

Known aliases are listed below, with their own releases, discographies and information.

=== Aristocrat P. Child ===
- Sun Ark Edit Bay #1 (2012), Sun Ark Records
- All Your Heart: The Label Under The Label (2012), Sun Ark Edit Bay
- Now We're Getting Somewhere! (2012), Sun Ark Edit Bay
- We Got Telephones (2012), Sun Ark Edit Bay

Aristocrat P. Child was an alternate alias of Cameron Stallones used to publish DJ mixes.

=== DJ Si Si Si Gracias ===
- Hallo Wee Trenty Thirty (2013), Tiny Mix Tapes
- Parallel Desires (2014), Sun Ark Edit Bay
- Thatness / Thereness (2014), Sun Ark Edit Bay
- DB12 003 (2020), Duca Bianco

DB12 003 is a vinyl 12" pressing of Aristocrat P. Child's "Sun Araw Edit Bay #1".

DJ Si Si Si Gracias was an alternate alias of Cameron Stallones used to publish DJ mixes.

=== Prince Sunarawma ===
- Irene (2012), Atelier Ciseaux

Members:

- Nimai Larson - Djembe
- Cameron Stallones - Guitar
- Taraka Larson - Harmonium
- Sebastian Jovanic - Synthesizer
- Pete Swanson - Mastering

The record sleeve notes this as a "hurricane jam(!)", recorded during hurricane Irene.

=== Celebrate Music Synthesizer Group ===
- Celebrate Music Synthesizer Group (2013), Sun Ark Records

Members:

- Cameron Stallones
- M. Geddes Gengras
- Tony Lowe
- Butchy Fuego

=== Turban Chopsticks ===
- Mexican Food (2013), Sun Ark Records

Members:

- Alex Gray - Drums
- Cameron Stallones - Guitar
- Tony Lowe - Guitar

Turban Chopsticks was a live recording / jam session recorded live in Adelaide 2012.

=== Sohni Chambers ===
- Yaw-Mah-Ha (2010), Goaty Tapes

Members:

- Cameron Stallones - Galaxie 8180 Organ
- Nick Malkin - 5-Piece Drum Kit

Each track is a live jam recorded at various times in the day, recorded on the tracklist.

=== Hold The Phone ===
- Safe Breezes [Improvisations for strings and synthesizer] (2011), Sun Ark Records

Members:

- Cameron Stallones - "Strings"
- Barrett Avner - Synthesizer

=== High Ceilings ===
- High Ceilings (2014), Sun Ark Records

Members:

- Cameron Stallones
- Dave Saymek
- Mitchell Brown
