= Ancient Romans (album) =

Studio album by Sun Araw
- Released: August 23, 2011
- Recorded: 2010
- Studio: Los Angeles, California, US
- Length: 79:28
- Label: Sun Ark Records; Drag City

Sun Araw chronology
On Patrol (2010)	Ancient Romans (2011)	The Inner Treaty (2012)

Ancient Romans is the fifth solo studio album by Cameron Stallones as Sun Araw. It was released on Sun Ark Records and Drag City on August 23, 2011.

== Critical reception ==
Professional ratings
Aggregate scores
Source	Rating
Metacritic	75/100
Review scores
Source	Rating
AllMusic	4/5 stars
The A.V. Club	C+
Beats Per Minute	72/100
Cokemachineglow	77/100
Consequence of Sound	B
Pitchfork	7.9/10
Spin	8/10
Tiny Mix Tapes	3.5/5 stars
Under the Radar	4/10 stars
XLR8R	8/10

At Metacritic, which assigns a weighted average score out of 100 to reviews from mainstream critics, the album received an average score of 75, based on 16 reviews, indicating "generally favorable reviews".

Paul Thompson of Pitchfork described the album as "another fever dream of dub-mottled organ grind and guitar squiggle, at once elemental and futuristic." Ned Raggett of AllMusic wrote, "Throughout the album the sense is of rough experimentation, a kind of direct curiosity in the collision of sampled loops, echoed vocals, bursting bass, and random moments." Ron Hart of Blurt stated that this album along with the Eternal Tapestry collaboration Night Galley cemented Sun Araw "continu[ing] to redefine the freak-out for the digital age, leading the pack of new young mindbenders looking to rock music down paths not yet explored without fear or frenzy". Adam Kivel of Consequence of Sound commented that "You can't help but move along to some of the entrancing, pulsing drones found on Ancient Romans; altogether, another epic, grandiose, striking LP from one of the best and most underrated musicians of the moment."

The Wire placed the album at number 12 on the "Top 50 Releases of the Year" list.

== Track listing ==
All tracks are written by Cameron Stallones.

Ancient Romans track listing
No.	Title	Length
1.	"Lucretius"	9:07
2.	"Crown Shell"	9:54
3.	"Crete"	9:30
4.	"Lute and Lyre"	7:01
5.	"At Delphi"	11:08
6.	"Fit for Caesar"	10:35
7.	"Trireme"	6:39
8.	"Impluvium"	15:35
Total length:		79:28

== Personnel ==
Credits adapted from liner notes.

- Sun Araw – performance, engineering, mixing
- Bobb Bruno – engineering
- Matthew Koshak – mixing
- Sonic Boom – mastering
