= The Woods (2011 film) =

- Directed by: Matthew Lessner
- Written by: Matthew Lessner
- Produced by: Matthew Lessner; Jett Steiger; Max Knies
- Starring: Toby David; Justin Phillips
- Cinematography: Wyatt Garfield
- Edited by: Matthew Lessner
- Music by: Lydia Ainsworth
- Production companies: Monte Lomax Productions; Greencard Pictures; Team G Kickstarter
- Release date: January 21, 2011 (Sundance)
- Running time: 90 minutes
- Country: United States
- Language: English
- Budget: Under $10 million

The Woods is a 2011 film written and directed by Matthew Lessner and starring Toby David and Justin Phillips. The script was written by Lessner with contributing writer Adam Mortemore, and additional dialogue by David and Phillips.

The film was co-produced by Lessner, Jett Steiger and Max Knies, and made history as the first film to premiere at the Sundance Film Festival that used Kickstarter for production financing. The film premiered at the 2011 Sundance Film Festival. The Woods premiered in New York at the BAMcinemaFest held at the Brooklyn Academy of Music. The Woods premiered internationally at the Cologne Conference in Cologne, Germany.

== Premise ==
A group of young Americans, disillusioned by the world's many problems, move to the wilds of the Pacific Northwest with hopes of creating their own utopian society. Despite their idealistic goals of revolution, the group comes ill-prepared for their new life, bringing a wide assortment of consumer electronics, recreational vehicles and snack foods. After catastrophic events in the outside world sever their electricity and Wi-Fi, and their leader's once-inspiring rhetoric fails to hold them together, the group is forced to find a way to live in harmony with the natural world.

== Cast ==
- Toby David as Daniel
- Justin Phillips as Dean
- Nicola Persky as Maggie
- Adam Mortemore as Lucas
- Brian Woods as Tanner
- Anne-Sophie as Nadia
- Lauren Hammersmith as Genevieve
- Amanda Furches as Annakate
- Chris Edley as Bryce

== Production ==
The film was filmed over 30 days in Oregon. To make the film, the director and cast lived in a tent-city in the forest.

== Music ==
The film features songs by

- Dirty Projectors
- Sun Araw
- Lucky Dragons
- Ananda Shankar
- Indian Jewelry
- Lydia Ainsworth

== Film Festival/ Film Conference screenings ==
Date	Venue	Location	Premiere Status
20 January 2011	Sundance Film Festival	Park City, Utah USA	World Premiere
24 February 2011	Portland International Film Festival	Portland, Oregon USA	
26 June 2011	BAMcinemaFest	Brooklyn, New York USA	New York Premiere
16 July 2011	Maine International Film Festival	Waterville, Maine USA	
26 August 2011	White Sands International Film Festival	Las Cruces, New Mexico USA	
26 September 2011	Cologne Conference	Cologne, Germany	International Premiere
7 October 2011	Rio de Janeiro International Film Festival	Rio de Janeiro, Brazil	
10 November 2011	Stockholm International Film Festival	Stockholm, Sweden	
10 November 2011	Napa Valley Film Festival	Napa, California USA	
15 November 2011	American Film Festival	Wrocław, Poland	
1 March 2012	The Queens World Film Festival	Jackson Heights, New York USA	
26 October 2012	Impakt Festival	Utrecht, The Netherlands	
16 November 2013	Clair-Obscur Filmfestival	Basel, Switzerland	

== University/ College screenings ==
Date	Institution	Location
1 April 2011	Swarthmore College	Swarthmore, Pennsylvania USA
31 May 2011	University of Chicago	Chicago, Illinois USA

== Miscellaneous screenings ==
Date	Location	Event
1 October 2011	Vienna, Austria	WALDflimmern, die 1. Filmschau zum Wald
8 October 2011	Linz, Austria	WALDflimmern, die 1. Filmschau zum Wald
15 October 2011	Salzburg, Austria	WALDflimmern, die 1. Filmschau zum Wald
3 November 2011	Los Angeles, California USA	Downtown Independent, Film Finds
02-8 March 2012	Brooklyn, New York USA	reRun Theater, 1 Week New York Theatrical Release
