= Tonstartssbandht =

American psychedelic rock band

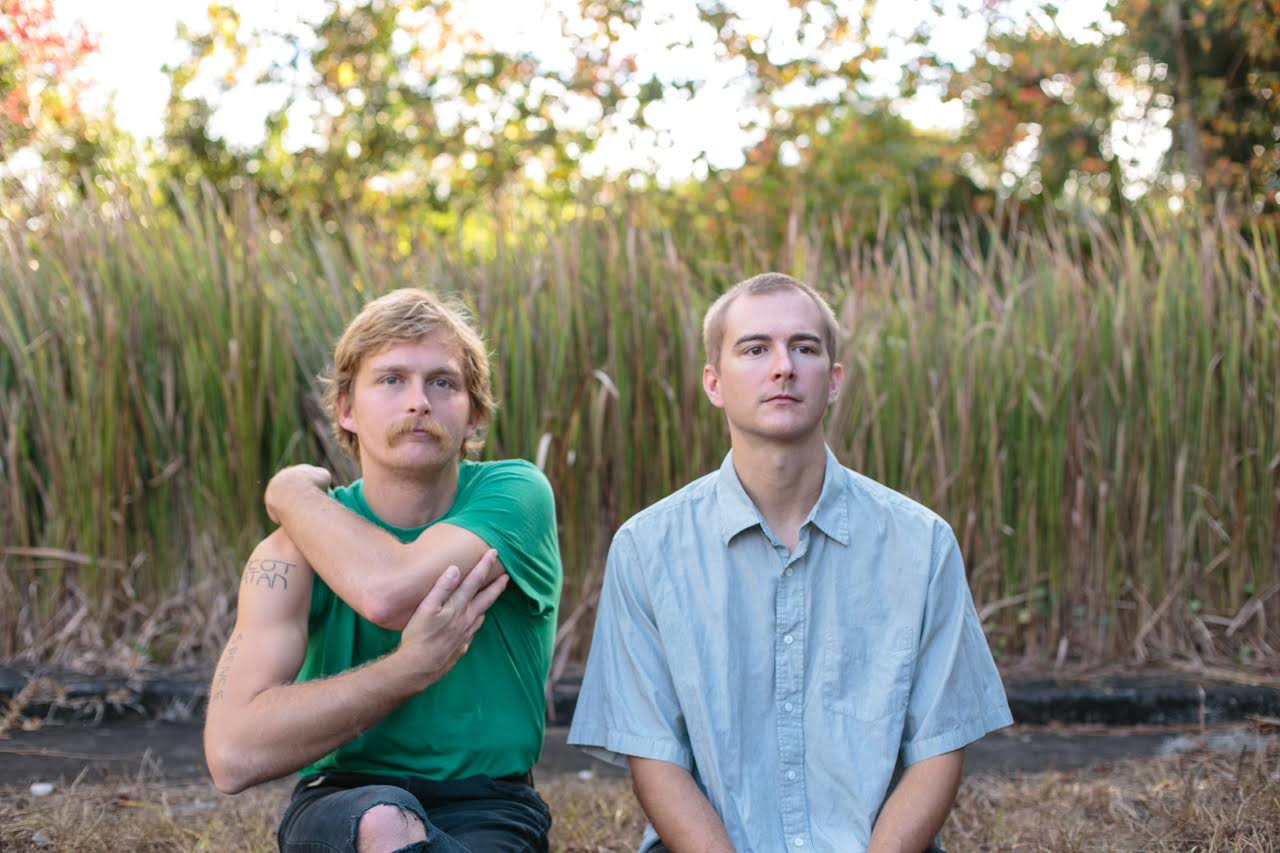
- Andy and Edwin White

Background information
- Origin: Orlando, Florida, U.S.
- Genres: Indie rock; noise rock; psychedelic pop; experimental pop; lo-fi
- Years active: 2007–present
- Labels: Mexican Summer; Arbutus; Does Are
- Members: Andy White; Edwin White
- Website: bandcamp.com

Tonstartssbandht (pronounced Tahn-starts-bandit or Tone-starts-band-hut) is an American psychedelic, noise rock band consisting of brothers Andy (guitar and vocals) and Edwin (drums and vocals) White. Based in Orlando (Edwin) and New York City (Andy), they originate from Orlando, Florida, and formed c. 2008 when Edwin was 20 years and Andy was 18. Their influences include the Beach Boys, The Velvet Underground demos, and Can live recordings. As of December 2017, the band has released 17 live and studio albums, as well as a series of solo recordings and collaborations.

Tonstartssbandht is known for their dynamic live shows, consisting of long often improvisational psychedelic jams coupled with krautrock elements. Their studio recordings are characterised by a deliberately lo-fi and DIY approach, while also incorporating post-production effects achieved through both analogue and digital means.

== Style ==
According to Edwin, "Our style of music definitely goes all over. When we sit down with a drum kit and a guitar, we like to do psychedelic boogie rock. When we're composing songs in the studio or something, rather than our bedrooms, we tend more towards the Brian Wilson vocal-pop stuff. Psychedelic boogie rock and experimental pop . . . those are the two core loves of ours." They have described their influences as including "classic rock, delta/piedmont blues, noise, experimental improv, free jazz, blues/boogie rock, drone, classical." They are also heavily influenced by Japanese noise rock, directly covering the style in their High Rise tribute band, High Rise II.

Andy plays a Danelectro 12-string electric guitar, which, in the context of a two-man band, allows him to "fill the range of low-to-high frequencies well, especially if I can write tunes with finger-picking figures that have a bass and high end." Previously he has used a Coral electric sitar. The vocals are often subject to heavy effects, especially the use of short echo.

Commenting on their prolific output, they have said, "Even a shitty recording can possibly be salvaged or used in a different way, but we generally just record record record. Just hit that button and don't worry about it. Do it or never do it." Andy has a long term interest in archiving and documenting the band's live shows, which he began recording with a 4-track. Recently he has been recording most of their tours, including dates across Europe, Russia, South East Asia, and Australia. When recording "studio" albums, they aim for a warm, room sound, using the close mic technique, and usually recording in their own apartments, with ambient sounds (including microwaves being turned on) apparent in instances.

== Members ==
- Andy White – guitar, vocals, electronics
- Edwin M. White – drums, vocals, electronics

Songwriting is shared equally between the brothers, who for long periods lived in different cities due to work and studying. Songs are often constructed by swapping demo recordings via email, Megaupload, and MediaFire. Both are prolific songwriters and have maintained a series of side and solo projects. Andy also records under the name 'Andy Boay', while Edwin's main solo project is titled Eola.

== Band name ==
Tonstartssbandht is a made up word. According to Edwin, it comes from "a word collage that I made cutting up letters and words and I pasted it down and I loved how it looked. Because it's made up, it confused people, people get thrown off by consonants, they take one look at it and sometimes they're disgusted, they're like 'That's not a word anyone could pronounce!'"

== Discography ==
The following are a mixture of live recordings and studio albums

- Water Buffalo (2008, Does Are, Black Cheeks)
- An When (2009, Does Are)
- Maihama (2009, Does Are)
- Dick Nights (2009, Does Are)
- Midnite Cobras (2010, Psychic Handshake Recordings)
- Hymn (2011, Does Are)
- Now I Am Become (2011, Arbutus)
- Sinkhole Storm and Sandwich (2011, Does Are, Arbutus)
- God Speed, Mans (with Dirty Beaches) (2013, Spacebridge)
- Nantes (2014, Does Are)
- Overseas (2014, Company Etc, Arbutus)
- Hanoi (2015, Does Are)
- Christchurch (2016)
- Sorcerer (2017, Kemado Records, Mexican Summer)
- Hong Kong (2020, Does Are)
- Petunia (2021, Does Are)
