= Silent Barn =

The Silent Barn was a collectively directed community art space in Brooklyn, NY. The initial iteration of the Silent Barn, an underground performance space, opened in 2006 in Ridgewood, Queens. The Silent Barn collective relocated to a new space in Bushwick, Brooklyn in 2012. The Silent Barn closed its Bushwick location in April 2018, citing financial difficulties and individual burnout as reasons for closing the space.

== History ==
The Silent Barn collective had its roots in a building at 915 Wyckoff Ave., in Ridgewood, Queens. Beginning in 2006, an ever-shifting group of artists, musicians, and organizers hosted live performances in their kitchen and basement, eventually coalescing around a group of core collaborators. The basement also housed the video-game collective Babycastles.

In the summer of 2011, the Queens location was shut down following a M.A.R.C.H. (Multi-Agency Response to Community Hotspots) raid and was subsequently vandalized and robbed while the residents were locked out. Shortly after, a team of folks involved in the Silent Barn community collectivized and developed a plan to find a new space and create a legal, above-ground all-ages art space. They launched a Kickstarter campaign on July 20, 2011, and raised over $40,000.

For a year and a half, the Silent Barn maintained no physical space. It established itself as an organization and held several public meetings, where the community discussed sustainability and DIY, brainstorming for the future.

Silent Barn's Bushwick location opened in December 2012. The three-story space housed a live performance venue with a cafe/bar; visual art project spaces Disclaimer Gallery and Casa Experimental; and Vital Joint, home of the Title:Point theater company; along with more than a dozen artists' studios, including Gravesend Recordings, Double Double Whammy and Aftermath Supplies. The top two floors of the building housed a four-apartment artists' residency program, with periodic open calls for new members.

The Silent Barn Bushwick location closed at the end of April in 2018. The closing was announced through a message from the collective that claimed they would close the space because of how hard it was to raise money for rent. The collective mentioned the challenges of gentrification and keeping the venue insured after an accidental fire added to normal difficulties of operating such a large venue. The Silent Barn collective tried to help their tenants and groups that used their space to find new homes; they particularly tried to find a new base and funding for the Educated Little Monsters group that regularly met at the Silent Barn.

== Organization ==
The Silent Barn was run by a collective of volunteers, who organize using non-hierarchical, consensus-based tools. Silent Barn was a not-for-profit project, though the Silent Barn's finances were administered by a private company, Paesthetics, LLC. The members of Paesthetics are all collective members, and were also named on the building's ten-year lease. Major decisions were discussed in the Kitchen, the organization's collective governing body, which was open to all members.

Silent Barn makes use of an informal lexicon based on cooking metaphors. Members of the Kitchen collective were known as "chefs". The Kitchen was guided by a living document known as the Cookbook.

The Silent Barn maintained a policy against corporate sponsorship of its space and its events and a safer spaces policy.
