= David Findlay (filmmaker) =

Canadian film director

David Findlay (born September 3, 1991) is a Canadian film director. He is most noted for his 2022 short film Lay Me by the Shore, which premiered at the 2022 Berlin International Film festival where it competed for a Crystal Bear in the Generation 14plus section, and was named to the Toronto International Film Festival's year-end Canada's Top Ten list for 2022.

Born and raised in Quebec City, Quebec, he studied at the University of British Columbia. He wrote and directed a number of short films before making his feature debut with Everything Outside in 2018. His later short films included Found Me in 2020, and Faces in 2024, which marked the acting debut of Dutch model Rianne Van Rompaey.

== Filmography ==
- C'est pas la fin du monde - 2011
- Callback - 2013
- The Middle Distance - 2014
- Nephew - 2015
- Everything Outside - 2018
- You Know Where You Belong - 2019
- Air - 2020
- Ndagukunda déjà - 2020
- Found Me - 2020
- Lay Me by the Shore - 2022
- Faces - 2024
