= Emily Kai Bock =

Canadian writer and film director

- Born: Toronto, Ontario, Canada
- Education: Emily Carr; Concordia
- Years active: 2012–present

Emily Kai Bock is a Canadian writer and film director.

In 2017, her short film A Funeral for Lightning was included in TIFF's annual Canada's Top Ten list of the top 10 Canadian short films of the year, selected by a panel of filmmakers and industry professionals. It went on to be nominated for a Canadian Screen Award for Best Live Action Short Drama, and won the Grand Jury Award for Best Short Film at the LA Film Festival and an honorable mention for Best U.S. Short and Best Tennessee Short at the Nashville Film Festival.

In 2014, Bock won the Prism Prize and UK Music Video Awards for writing and directing a video for the Arcade Fire song Afterlife and was nominated for Director of the Year at the 2014 Much Music Video Awards.

Bock has also directed notable music videos for Lorde, Grizzly Bear, and Grimes.

== Early life ==
Bock was born in Toronto, Ontario. She graduated with a Bachelor of Fine Arts in painting and sculpture from Emily Carr University of Art and Design, before studying film production at Concordia University while a resident of the Lab Synthese loft space.

In 2012, after directing the music video for Grimes' song "Oblivion", Bock withdrew from her study.

== Influences ==
Bock was influenced by the music videos of Daft Punk, Radiohead, and the Foo Fighters—directed by Spike Jonze, Michel Gondry, and Jonathan Glazer. According to Sarah Nicole Prickett of The Globe and Mail, Bock "favours a 'run and gun' style, shooting with precision but not necessarily permission, in locations that feel plucked from memory, and with considerable speed".

== Videography ==
=== Music videos ===
Year	Title	Artist	Ref.
2012	"Running Back To Everyone"	Kool Music	
2012	"Oblivion"	Grimes	
2012	"Yet Again"	Grizzly Bear	
2013	"Afterlife"	Arcade Fire	
2014	"Yellow Flicker Beat"	Lorde	
2022	"The Lightning I, II"	Arcade Fire	

=== Television advertisements ===
Year	Product	Company	Ref.
	Coca-Cola	The Coca-Cola Company	
	Fuel for Life (fragrance)	Diesel	
