= Blue Hawaii (band) =

Canadian electronic music duo

- Origin: Montreal, Quebec, Canada
- Genres: Ambient pop, techno, dream pop, indietronic
- Years active: 2010–present
- Label: Arbutus Records
- Members: Raphaelle "Ra" Standell-Preston; Alex "Agor" Kirby

Blue Hawaii are a Canadian electronic music duo from Montreal, Quebec, composed of Braids member Raphaelle "Ra" Standell-Preston and Alexander Kirby (also known as Agor). They have released an EP, Blooming Summer (2010) and three studio albums, Untogether (2013), Tenderness (2017) and Open Reduction Internal Fixation (2019) all on Arbutus Records. The first two albums were nominated for the Juno Award for Electronic Album of the Year.

== History ==
The band's debut EP, Blooming Summer, was released in 2010 on Arbutus, a cooperative label set up to promote members of a music and artistic community in Montreal's Mile End neighbourhood. The two musicians performed in Montreal, at times with other members of the collective.

The pair released their first studio album, Untogether in 2013, and then went out on tour. The album chronicled the end of the pair's romantic relationship, and the group ended after the release, with Ra concentrating on Braids and Agor focusing on DJing.

In 2014, Agor reworked some of their existing tracks and released a mixtape, Agor Edits.

The group reunited in 2016 in Los Angeles, and a single, No One Like You, was released in 2017. That same year, Blue Hawaii released their second album, Tenderness.

In 2018, the pair performed at the Ypsigrock festival in Sicily.

Their third studio album, Open Reduction Internal Fixation, was released on October 11, 2019.

Diamond Shovel, the pair's fourth studio album was released on June 7, 2024.

== Discography ==
=== Studio albums ===
- Untogether (2013, Arbutus Records)
- Tenderness (2017, Arbutus Records)
- Open Reduction Internal Fixation (2019, Arbutus Records)
- Diamond Shovel (2024, Helix Records)

=== Mixtapes ===
- Agor Edits (2014, Arbutus Records)

=== Singles and EPs ===
- Blue Hawaii / Braids split cassette EP with Braids (2010, Arbutus Records)
- Blooming Summer EP (2010, Arbutus Records)
- "Try to Be" promo CD single (2013, Arbutus Records)
- "Get Happy" / "Get Happier" digital single (2014, Arbutus Records)
- "No One Like You" digital single (2017, Arbutus Records)
- "All That Blue" digital single (2019, Arbutus Records)
- Under 1 House EP (2020, Arbutus Records)
- "My Bestfriend's House" digital single (2022, Arbutus Records)
- "Butterfly" digital single (2022, Arbutus Records)
