= Tops (band) =

Canadian indie rock band

TOPS
- Origin: Montreal, Quebec, Canada
- Genres: Indie rock; soft rock; synth-pop; dream pop
- Years active: 2011–present
- Labels: Arbutus, Musique TOPS
- Spinoff of: Silly Kissers
- Members: Jane Penny; David Carriere; Riley Fleck; Marta Cikojevic
- Past members: Thom Gillies; Madeline Glowicki; Jenni Roberts; Alana DeVito; Jackson MacIntosh

Tops (stylized in all capital letters as TOPS) is a Canadian indie rock band from Montreal, Quebec, which currently consists of Jane Penny, David Carriere, Riley Fleck, and Marta Cikojevic. They were formed in 2011 following the disbandment of synthpop group Silly Kissers, of which Carriere, Penny, and Gillies were members, along with Arbutus Records recording artist Sean Nicholas Savage. TOPS are prominent within the Arbutus Records and Canadian indie music scenes. Their debut album, Tender Opposites, was released on February 28, 2012, in Canada and the United States, and October 1, 2012, in the rest of the world, to generally positive reviews. The album was named the eighth best album of 2012 by Gorilla vs. Bear. Their second studio album, Picture You Staring, was released in 2014 on Arbutus Records and featured artwork from LA-based artist Jessica Dean Harrison.

== History ==
TOPS was founded in 2011 by childhood friends Jane Penny and David Carriere from Edmonton, Alberta. Penny and Carriere met drummer Riley Fleck at La Brique, the loft venue where they rehearsed for shows with their former band, Silly Kissers with Sean Nicholas Savage.

In 2012, TOPS released their debut album, Tender Opposites, which received critical acclaim for its nostalgic yet refreshing approach to pop music. The album features former bassist Thom Gillies.

The band followed up with the release of Picture You Staring in 2014, further solidifying their reputation for creating infectious tunes layered with intricate instrumentation and Penny's emotive singing.

Marta Cikojevic joined as keyboardist in 2017.

The band wrote two songs for the 2025 film Mile End Kicks.

== Discography ==
=== Studio albums ===
- 2012: Tender Opposites (Arbutus Records / Atelier Ciseaux)
- 2014: Picture You Staring (Arbutus Records)
- 2017: Sugar at the Gate (Arbutus Records)
- 2020: I Feel Alive (Musique TOPS)
- 2025: Bury the Key (Ghostly International)

=== Singles and EPs ===
- 2012: "Diamond Look" / "Easy Friends" (Arbutus Records / Atelier Ciseaux)
- 2014: "Change of Heart" / "Sleeptalker" (Arbutus Records)
- 2015: "Anything" (Arbutus Records)
- 2015: "The Hollow Sound of the Morning Chimes" (Arbutus Records)
- 2019: "Echo of Dawn" / "Seven Minutes" (Musique TOPS)
- 2022: "Empty Seats" (Musique TOPS)
- 2024: "Sunday Morning" (Sub Pop Records)
- 2025: "ICU2" (Ghostly International)
- 2025: "Chlorine" (Ghostly International)

=== Videos ===
Year	Video	Director	Sources
2022	"Janet Planet"	Anthony Martino Maurice	
2020	"Colder & Closer"	Mashie Alam	
2020	"I Feel Alive"	Mashie Alam	
2019	"Topless"	Jane Penny	
2017	"Marigold & Gray"	Laura-Lynn Petrick	
2017	"Further"	Jane Penny	
2017	"Petals"	Jane Penny	
2015	"Anything"	Tommy Keith	
2015	"Sleeptalker"	Sadie Holliday	
2015	"Driverless Passenger"	Jason Harvey	
2014	"Outside"	Fantavious Fritz	
2014	"Way to Be Loved"	Fantavious Fritz	
2014	"Change of Heart"	David Carriere & Jane Penny	
2012	"Turn Your Love Around"	Graham Foy	
2012	"Double Vision"	David Carriere	
2012	"Diamond Look"	Marilis Cardinal	
2012	"Rings of Saturn"	Jasper Baydala	

== Band members ==
Current members

- Jane Penny (vocals, keyboard, flute) (2011–present)
- David Carriere (guitar) (2011–present)
- Riley Fleck (drums) (2011–present)
- Marta Cikojevic (keyboard) (2017–present)

Former members

- Thom Gillies (bass) (2011–2013)
- Madeline Glowicki (bass) (2013–2014)
- Jenni Roberts (bass) (2014–2015)
- Alana Marta DeVito (bass) (2015)
- Jackson Macintosh (bass) (2016–2019)
