= Sean Nicholas Savage =

Canadian musician

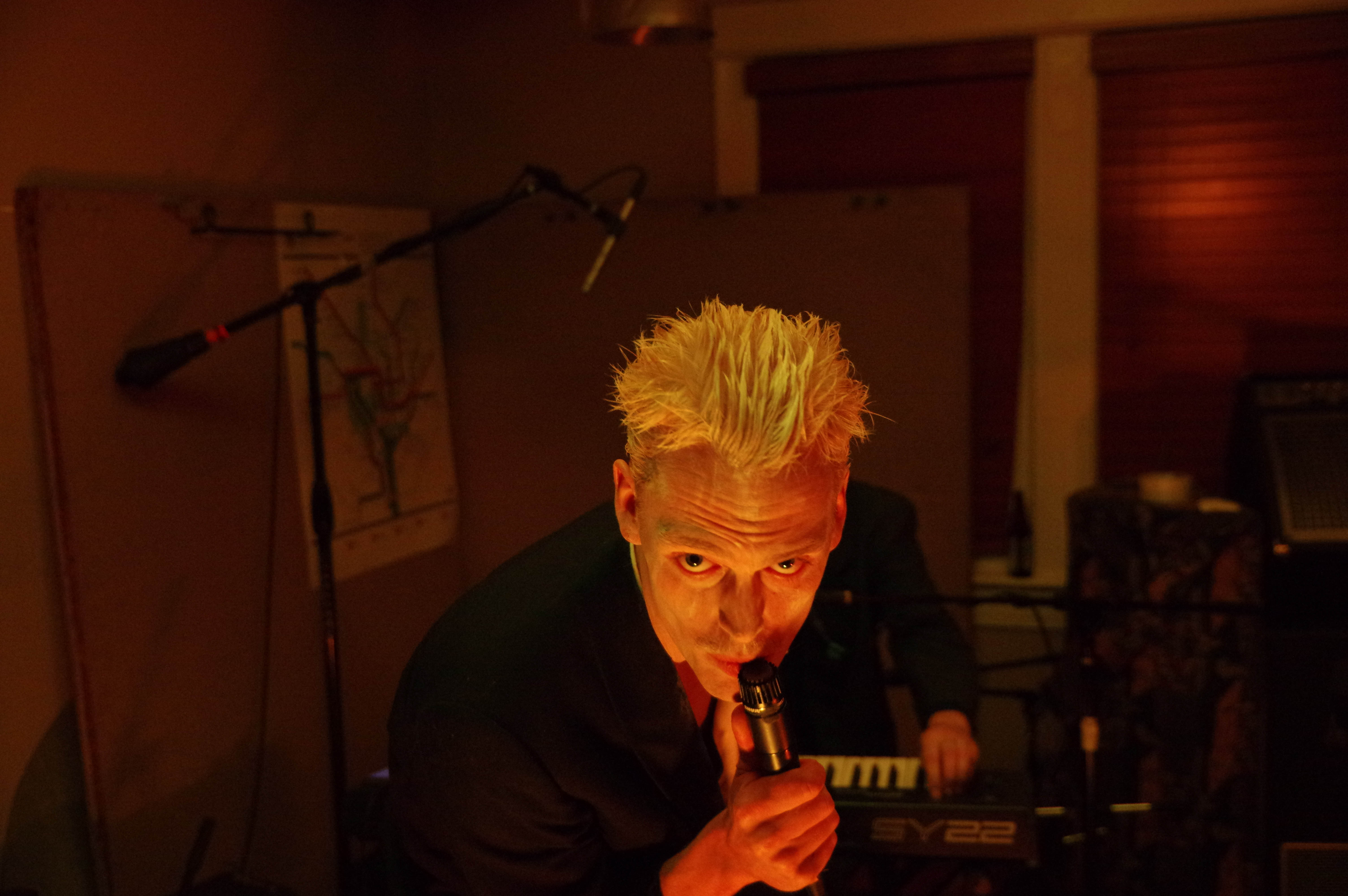
- Paperhaus, Washington, D.C. 10.10.2015

Background information
- Origin: Edmonton, Alberta, Canada
- Genres: Pop, indie rock, ballads
- Years active: 2007–present
- Label: Arbutus Records
- Website: seannicholassavage.com

Sean Nicholas Savage is a Canadian musician, singer, songwriter, and musical playwright. He has been described by Emilie Friedlander in an article for The Fader as "a singer-songwriter, madcap philosopher, and all-around scene-pillar in the particular freak-flag-flying sector of the Canadian music community". He is known for his prolific output, poetic lyrics and varied musical style.

Savage has released primarily on Arbutus Records, and was one of the first artists to join the label after its inception in 2009. He has had a number of collaborations, including a production and vocal credit on Solange's number-one album on the Billboard 200 in the United States. In 2025, Savage released the album The Knowing, co-released by Born Losers Records and Mansions and Millions.

== Musical plays ==
- Please Thrill Me Montreal, Canada, February 17th – March 1st (2020)
- The Fear Berlin, Germany, August 24 (2022)
- The Fear Los Angeles, USA, October 30 (2022)

== Discography ==
- Summer 5000 (2008) CD
- Spread Free Like A Butterfly (2009) Vinyl
- Movin Up in Society (2010) Cassette
- Mutual Feelings of Respect And Admiration (2010) Vinyl
- Trippple Midnight Karma (2011) Cassette
- Won Ton Jaz (2011) Cassette
- Flamingo (2011) Cassette
- Other Life (2013) Vinyl, CD
- Bermuda Waterfall (2014) Vinyl, CD
- Other Death (2015) Vinyl, CD
- Magnificent Fist (2016) Cassette
- Yummycoma (2017) Cassette
- Screamo (2018) Cassette
- Life Is Crazy (2020) Vinyl, CD
- Shine (2022) Vinyl
- The Knowing (2025)

=== Collaborations ===
In 2017, Savage was credited a featured artist on Kirin J. Callinan's song 'My Moment feat. Sean Nicholas Savage' from the 2017 album 'Bravado'.

=== Videos ===
Year	Video	Director
2022	"Harmony"	Jasper Baydala
2022	"Streets Of Rage"	Andie Riekstina
2020	"Nothing As It Seems"	JJ Weihl and Johnathan Jarzyna
2016	"Everything Baby Blue"	Sean Nicholas Savage
2016	"Over The Night"	Sean Nicholas Savage, Better Person
2015	"Propaganda"	Jasper Baydala
2013	"Other Life"	Angus Borsos
2012	"You Changed Me"	Angus Borsos
