= Arbutus Records =

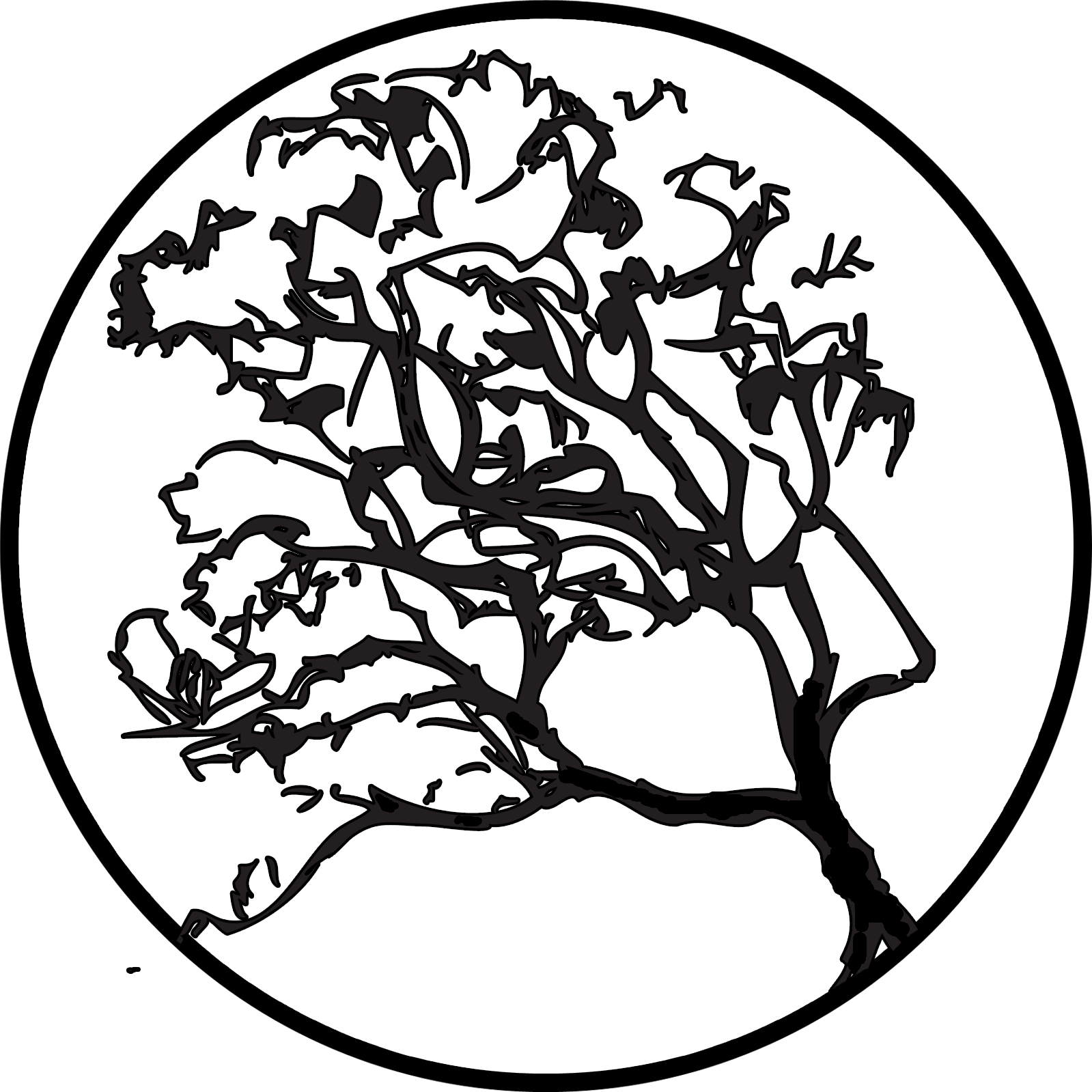
- Founded: 2009
- Founder: Sebastian Cowan
- Distributor: Secretly Distribution
- Country of origin: Canada
- Location: Montreal
- Official website: www.arbutusrecords.com

Arbutus Records is a Montreal based record label and management company founded by Sebastian Cowan in 2009. The label is named after the street by the same name in Vancouver, where Cowan grew up. The label have also begun expanding outside of Montreal, signing international artist Σtella, from Athens, Greece, on April 16, 2019, and Toronto-based trio Rapport on August 28, 2019.

== History ==
Arbutus Records was created by a community of artists and musicians from the Montreal DIY music scene that came together in the 4600 square foot Mile End, warehouse loft space called Lab Synthèse. Lab Synthèse was co-founded by Sebastian Cowan in 2007. The record label was created in order to promote and cultivate the bands associated with the space. Police shut down Lab Synthèse and Cowan began managing the artists that performed there shortly after, resulting in the formation of Arbutus Records. Cowan and the label kickstarted the music careers of Blue Hawaii, Grimes, Majical Cloudz, Sean Nicholas Savage and TOPS among others early on. Arbutus records fosters a family environment that is not often seen in labels of its size, and as a result many of the artists under the label have remained in the label for over ten years. The label operates as a DIY ethic community of multimedia artists and musicians, who work collaboratively to develop and release music which combines punk ethos and pop music.

== Label values ==
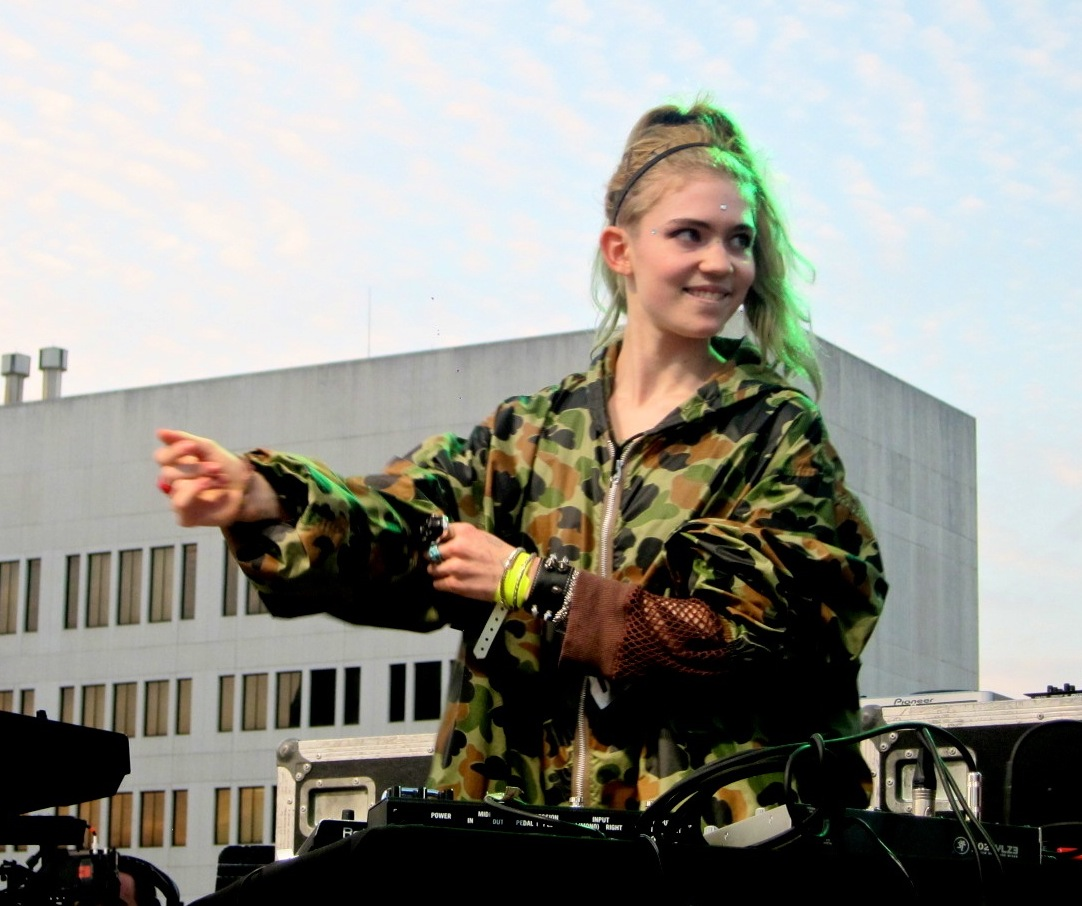
Label member Grimes performing in 2012

Arbutus Records was founded based on ideals that stemmed from the values of Constellation Records, focusing on curating individuality rather than a common sound. The label considers the release of records as a creative and collaborative process, moreover that the "art [made] is that of the artist", and they will always work in service of that. Ensuring that each artists vision and desires are communicated to the fullest extent possible is a priority at Arbutus Records. The label also puts emphasis on DIY culture in the music that they release and supporting their artists to accomplish more with very little.

Arbutus Records treats those they work with as family. They believe that everyone should be treated equally and have access to a quality music experience, whether in the form of appreciation or creation.

== Artists ==
- Blue Hawaii
- Braids
- Doldrums
- Graham Van Pelt
- Grimes
- Lydia Ainsworth
- Majical Cloudz
- Michael Stasis
- Moon King
- Σtella
- Sean Nicholas Savage
- Tonstartssbandht
- TOPS

== Discography ==
Year	Album details
2008	Sean Nicholas Savage - Little Submarine: Released: July 18, 2008; Genre: Pop; Format: CD
2009	Oxen Talk - O Mores!: Released: January 1, 2009; Genres: Rock, Pop; Format: CD
2010	Grimes - Geidi Primes: Released: 2010; Genres: Electronic, Pop; Format: CD
2011	Tonstartssbandht – Now I Am Become: Released: 2011; Genres: Rock, Pop, Folk, World & Country; Format: CD
2012	TOPS – Tender Opposites: Released: 2012; Genre: Indie Rock; Format: CD
2013	Blue Hawaii – Untogether: Released: March 4, 2013; Genres: Electronic Pop; Format: CD, Digipak
2014	Lydia Ainsworth – Right From Real: Released: 2014; Genre: Indie Pop; Format: CD
2015	Braids – Deep In The Iris: Released: April 28, 2015; Genre: Synth-pop; Format: CD
2016	Mozart's Sister – Eternally Girl b/w Angel: Released: 2016; Genre: Dance-pop; Format: Cassette
2017	Honey Harper – Universal Country: Released: 2017; Genre: Rock; Format: EP
2018	Graham Van Pelt – Time Travel: Released: 2018; Genres: Electronic, Rock; Format: CD, Vinyl
2019	Moon King – Voice Of Lovers: Released: 2019; Genres: Electronic, Pop; Format: Cassette, Digital download
2020	Σtella – The Break: Released: January 24, 2020; Genre: Pop; Format: CD, Vinyl, Digital download
