= Every Time I Die discography =

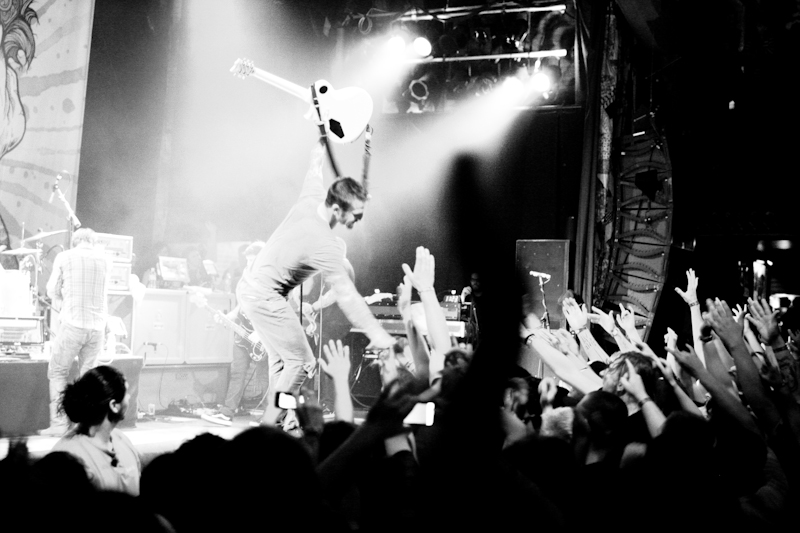
- Every Time I Die onstage in 2009
- Studio albums: 9
- EPs: 2
- Video albums: 2
- Music videos: 15

The discography of Every Time I Die, an American metalcore band, consists of nine studio albums, two extended plays (EPs), two video albums and 15 music videos. Founded in Buffalo, New York in 1998, Every Time I Die was formed by vocalist Keith Buckley, guitarists Jordan Buckley (Keith's brother) and Andy Williams, bassist John McCarthy and drummer Mike "Ratboy" Novak. After releasing EP The Burial Plot Bidding War in 2000, the band replaced McCarthy with Aaron Ratajczak and released its debut full-length album Last Night in Town on Ferret Music in 2001. Stephen Micciche became the group's third bassist in 2001, performing on the band's second album Hot Damn! released in 2003.

Micciche left in 2005 and was briefly replaced by Kevin Falk, who performed on the band's third album Gutter Phenomenon. The 2005 release reached number 71 on the US Billboard 200. Chris Byrnes took Falk's place later in the year, who was later substituted for Keller Harbin for touring. The band released its first video album Shit Happens: The Life. The Stage. The Road. The DVD. in 2006. The group's fourth album (and their final release on Ferret Music), The Big Dirty, was released in 2007 and reached number 41 on the Billboard 200, as well as entering the UK Rock & Metal Albums Chart at number five. Josh Newton joined the band as Harvin's full-time replacement in 2007.

After signing with Epitaph Records earlier in the year, Every Time I Die released fifth album New Junk Aesthetic in September 2009, which again reached the top 50 of the Billboard 200. Shortly before the album's release, Novak left the band and was replaced by Ryan "Legs" Leger. The following year the band released its second video Shit Happens: The Series?, which features a series of web episodes and additional footage. Ex Lives followed in 2012, topping the Billboard Hard Rock Albums and UK Rock & Metal Albums charts. Micciche returned to the band for a second stint shortly before the album's release. 2014's From Parts Unknown reached number 22 on the Billboard 200.

In February 2015, Leger left the band and was replaced by Daniel Davison. Four-track EP Salem was issued later in the year, before the band's eighth studio album Low Teens was released in September 2016, topping the Billboard Hard Rock Albums chart and reaching number two on the Top Rock Albums chart.

== Studio albums ==
List of studio albums, with selected chart positions
Title	Album details	Peak chart positions									
Title	Album details	US	US Hard	US Indie	US Rock	AUS	CAN	GER	SCO	UK	UK Rock
Last Night in Town	Released: August 14, 2001; Label: Ferret; Format: CD, LP	—	—	—	—	—	—	—	—	—	—
Hot Damn!	Released: July 1, 2003; Label: Ferret; Formats: CD, CD+DVD, LP	—	—	—	—	—	—	—	—	—	—
Gutter Phenomenon	Released: August 23, 2005; Label: Ferret; Formats: CD, LP	71	—	10	—	—	—	—	—	—	—
The Big Dirty	Released: September 4, 2007; Label: Ferret; Formats: CD, CD+DVD, LP	41	6	3	12	—	—	—	—	—	5
New Junk Aesthetic	Released: September 15, 2009; Label: Epitaph; Formats: CD, CD+DVD, LP	46	5	6	16	81	—	—	—	—	20
Ex Lives	Released: March 6, 2012; Label: Epitaph; Formats: CD, LP, DL	25	1	4	7	46	—	—	—	—	1
From Parts Unknown	Released: July 1, 2014; Label: Epitaph; Formats: CD, LP, DL	22	3	3	5	32	—	—	—	—	16
Low Teens	Released: September 23, 2016; Label: Epitaph; Formats: CD, LP	23	1	2	2	25	57	80	74	89	8
Radical	Released: October 22, 2021; Label: Epitaph; Formats: CD, LP, digital	45	2	6	7	23	—	—	—	73	4
"—" denotes a release that did not chart or was not issued in that region.

== Extended plays ==
List of extended plays
Title	Album details
The Burial Plot Bidding War	Released: 2000; Label: Goodfellow; Format: CD
Salem	Released: June 16, 2015; Label: Epitaph; Formats: DL, 7" vinyl

== Video albums ==
List of video albums
Title	Album details
Shit Happens: The Life. The Stage. The Road. The DVD.	Released: October 31, 2006; Label: Ferret; Format: DVD; Directed by:Doug Spangenberg
Shit Happens: The Series?	Released: October 26, 2010; Label: Epitaph; Format: 10 Web based episodes; Directed by: Doug Spangenberg

== Music videos ==
List of music videos, showing director(s) and year released
Title	Year	Director(s)	Ref.
"The Logic of Crocodiles"	2001	unknown	
"Ebolarama"	2003	Darren Doane	
"I Been Gone a Long Time"	2003	unknown	
"Kill the Music"	2005	Darren Doane	
"The New Black"	2006	Dan Rush	
"We'rewolf"	2007	Bill Fishman	
"No Son of Mine"	2008	Salvatore Perrone	
"Wanderlust"	2009	Chris Sims	
"After One Quarter of a Revolution"	2010	Doug Spangenberg	
"Underwater Bimbos from Outer Space"	2012	Keith Buckley	
"Revival Mode"	2012	Robert Schober	
"A Typical Miracle"	2012	Bobby Bates	
"I Suck (Blood)"	2012	Carlo Opperman	
"Thirst"	2014	Doug Spangenberg	
"Decayin with the Boys"	2014	Doug Spangenberg	
"The Coin Has a Say"	2016	Joshua Halling	
"It Remembers"	2016	Brandon Dermer	
"Map Change"	2017	Kyle Thrash	
"Post-Boredom"	2021	Tes Hash and Daniel Davison	
"Thing With Feathers"	2021	Brandon Dermer	
