= Better Lovers =

American metalcore band

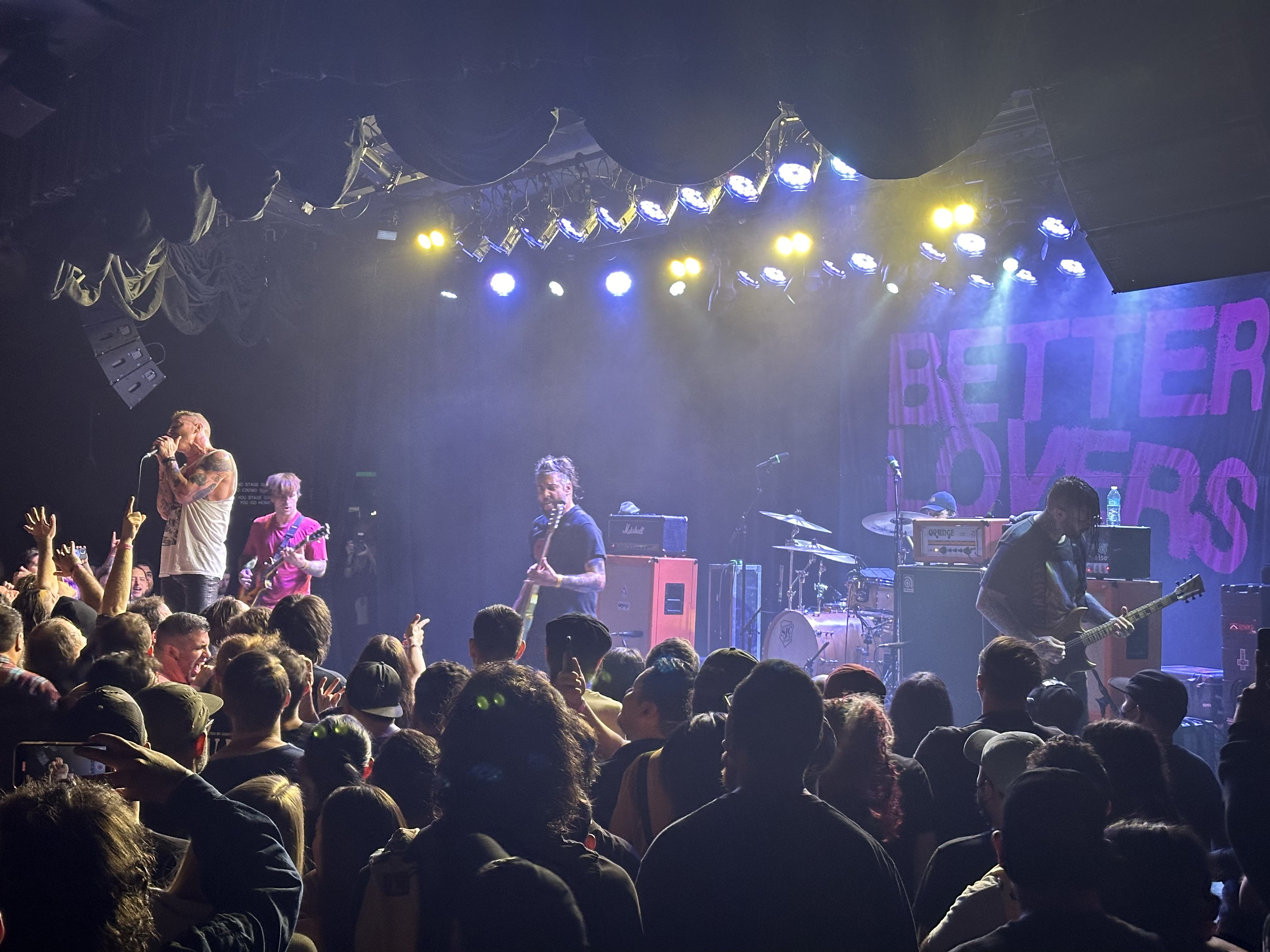
- Better Lovers performing in 2023. Left to right: Greg Puciato, Jordan Buckley, Steve Micciche, Clayton "Goose" Holyoak, and Will Putney

Background information
- Origin: Buffalo, New York, U.S.
- Genres: Metalcore; hardcore punk; mathcore
- Years active: 2023–present
- Label: SharpTone
- Spinoff of: Every Time I Die
- Members: Jordan Buckley; Clayton "Goose" Holyoak; Stephen Micciche; Will Putney
- Past members: Greg Puciato
- Website: betterloversband.com

Better Lovers is an American metalcore band from Buffalo, New York. Formed in 2023 after the dissolution of Every Time I Die, the group consists of guitarists Jordan Buckley and Will Putney, bassist Stephen Micciche, and drummer Clayton Holyoak. The band is signed to SharpTone Records and have released one album, one EP, and two singles. Often labeled a supergroup, the band has featured members formerly of Every Time I Die (Buckley, Micciche, and Holyoak) and The Dillinger Escape Plan (Greg Puciato), as well as a current member of Fit For An Autopsy (Putney).

== History ==
=== Formation and God Made Me An Animal (2023) ===
Jordan Buckley, Stephen Micciche and Clayton "Goose" Holyoak were once part of the metalcore band Every Time I Die, alongside Andy Williams and Jordan Buckley's brother Keith. In December 2021, Keith took a hiatus from the band citing mental health concerns, but later accused his bandmates of "ostracizing" him from the band. Every Time I Die issued a statement saying they were working to resolve issues privately, and would play one last show on December 11. On January 18, 2022, Jordan Buckley, Williams, Micciche and Holyoak released a statement saying they were no longer performing as Every Time I Die due to inabilities to communicate with Keith or reach an agreement to continue as a band, effectively breaking up Every Time I Die after 24 years. The next day, Keith revealed he'd been issued a cease-and-desist on December 20, two weeks following the band's final show, ordering him to stop using the band's name and likeness.

Despite the breakup and public coverage, Jordan Buckley, Williams, Micciche and Holyoak would continue to practice together, with intentions to start a new band under a different name. In November 2022, Buckley posted video clips to social media working on new material with Micciche, Holyoak, and producer Will Putney at his studio in New Jersey. Putney had produced Every Time I Die's last two albums, Low Teens and Radical. Guitarist Andy Williams was not present in these sessions, having fully committed to a career in professional wrestling with All Elite Wrestling as "The Butcher," and Micciche would later confirm Williams was not involved with their initial recordings.

On April 17, 2023, Buckley, Micciche and Holyoak officially announced the formation of Better Lovers with their first single, "30 Under 13", released through SharpTone Records. The band revealed that Putney was officially a member of the group as a guitarist, and that they were joined by vocalist Greg Puciato, formerly of the metalcore band The Dillinger Escape Plan. Puciato had been working with heavy metal supergroup Killer Be Killed, electronic supergroup The Black Queen, and as a solo artist prior to joining the band. Speaking about whether Better Lovers was a supergroup, bassist Steve Micciche said "we don't look at it that way. While it's impossible to not acknowledge the past bands that we were in that we're proud of, this thing is its own thing/beast/entity. We're not here for a cup of coffee. We still have something to say creatively, and that's a thing that doesn't just go away and is very important to all of us."

One day after the announcement, the band revealed they would be joining The Ghost Inside, Underoath and We Came As Romans on their summer North American tour, and throughout April and the rest of summer would also announce their own headline dates in both America and the UK, including debut shows in their hometown of Buffalo, New York. On July 7, 2023, Better Lovers surprise released their debut EP, God Made Me an Animal, through SharpTone.

In an interview with Revolver on September 26, the band intimated they had enough songs in the works for a whole album, but alluded to the possibility of more music releasing before the end of the year. On November 16, they would indeed release a new single, "Two Alive Amongst The Dead," and later in the year announced 2024 tour dates in North America in the spring and Europe in the summer.

=== Highly Irresponsible (2024–2025) ===
On January 9, 2024, the band revealed their intent to release their debut full-length record in 2024. On their Instagram, they cited the sporadic releases they'd done throughout the previous year, but "to do that with the sixteen new songs we’ve written would be unsafe." The timing of their studio sessions fit in before the start of their North American tour later in the spring. On April 2, 2024, the band released the single "The Flowering," a version of a track played at shows the previous year under the working title "Punk."

On July 30, Better Lovers announced their debut studio album, Highly Irresponsible, set for release on October 25 through SharpTone. In an email sent to mailing list subscribers, the band said "We put a lot of energy into this one and love every second of it. A record so purely and selfishly for us, it gave birth to some real magic translating through the speakers. Old habits and new tricks. Insanity and restraint, beauty and chaos. Art as it is intended." The lead single, "A White Horse Covered In Blood," was released the next day, along with its music video. Three more singles followed: "Future Myopia" on August 28, "At All Times" on September 25, and "Love As An Act Of Rebellion" on October 22nd.

Highly Irresponsible was released on October 25, 2024. The record was supported with a North American tour with Full of Hell, Gouge Away, Cloakroom and Spy during Fall 2024, the band's second annual Blissmas festival in Buffalo in December, and a United Kingdom tour with Frontierer and Greyhaven in January 2025.

The band released a deluxe edition of Highly Irresponsible with two new songs and an alternate cover on November 13, 2025.

=== Departure of Puciato and second studio album (2026–present) ===
On February 24, 2026, the band announced they had amicably parted ways with Greg Puciato and are working on a second studio album.

== Musical style ==
Better Lovers' style has been described as metalcore, hardcore punk, and mathcore. Despite incorporating members from multiple bands, MetalSucks described their sound as "more Every Time I Die than Dillinger Escape Plan, but if you love early 2000s chaotic hardcore and metalcore, God Made Me an Animal will be your jam."

== Members ==
Current

- Jordan Buckley – guitar (2023–present)
- Steve Micciche – bass (2023–present)
- Clayton "Goose" Holyoak – drums (2023–present)
- Will Putney – guitar (2023–present)

Former

- Greg Puciato – vocals (2023–2026)

== Discography ==
Albums

- Highly Irresponsible (2024)

EPs

- God Made Me an Animal (2023)

Singles

- "30 Under 13" (2023)
- "Two Alive Amongst The Dead" (2023)
- "The Flowering" (2024)
- "A White Horse Covered In Blood" (2024)
- "Future Myopia" (2024)
- "At All Times" (2024)
- "Love As An Act Of Rebellion" (2024)
- "Don't Forget To Say Please" (2025)
- "The Impossible End" (2025)
