= Doug Spangenberg =

American music video director

Doug Spangenberg is an American music video director.

== Live music videos (directed) ==
- Jamey Johnson
- Adam Lambert – "Glam Nation Live"
- Kelis – VEVO "Summer Sets"
- N.E.R.D
- Harry Connick Jr. – Sessions @ AOL
- John Legend
- Boys Like Girls – "Read Between the Lines" DVD
- Lamb of God – "Terror and Hubris"
- Lamb of God – "Killadelphia" (certified RIAA platinum)
- Lamb of God – "Walk With Me In Hell" (certified RIAA platinum)
- Every Time I Die – "Shit Happens" (2006)
- Every Time I Die – "The Dudes and Don'ts Of Recording" (released with The Big Dirty deluxe edition album, 2007)
- Every Time I Die – "Party Pooper" (released with New Junk Aesthetic special edition, 2009)
- Every Time I Die – "Shit Happens: The Series" (2010)
- Unearth – "Alive from the Apocalypse"
- Coheed and Cambria – "Neverender" (debuted at #1 on Billboard's Top Music Video chart) (certified RIAA gold)
- Coheed and Cambria – "We Are Together, We Tour Together" (released with The Afterman: Ascension deluxe edition album, 2012)
- Hellfest – "Hellfest 2000"
- Hellfest – "Hellfest 2002"
- Hellfest – "Hellfest Vol. 3"
- Mindless Self Indulgence – "Our Pain, Your Gain"
- Sounds of the Underground – "Sounds of the Underground"

== Music videos (directed) ==
- N.E.R.D – Life As A Fish
- N.E.R.D – Help Me
- N.E.R.D – Hot N Fun (live version)
- Boys Like Girls – Heart Heart Heartbreak
- Boys Like Girls – Heels Over Head
- Harry Connick Jr. – Christmas Set from NYC
- Stone Sour – Made of Scars
- Lamb of God – Set To Fail
- Lamb of God – Now You've Got Something To Die For
- Lamb of God – Walk With Me In Hell
- Job For A Cowboy – Altered Through Catechization
- Job For A Cowboy – Unfurling a Darkened Gospel
- Terror – Lost
- Terror – Betrayer
- Terror – Never Alone
- Killswitch Engage – Life to Lifeless

== Documentaries (produced) ==
- HORI SMOKU – The Story of Norman "Sailor Jerry" Collins
- Hellfest video documentaries
