= The Big Dirty =

The Big Dirty may refer to:

- The Big Dirty (album), an album by Every Time I Die
- Trailer Park Boys: The Big Dirty, an alternate title for the film Trailer Park Boys: The Movie
