= Highly Irresponsible =

2024 studio album by Better Lovers

Studio album by Better Lovers
- Released: October 25, 2024
- Recorded: January–February 2024
- Studios: Graphic Nature Audio, Belleville, New Jersey
- Genres: Metalcore; hardcore punk
- Length: 34:57
- Label: SharpTone
- Producer: Will Putney

Better Lovers chronology
God Made Me An Animal (2023)	Highly Irresponsible (2024)

Singles from Highly Irresponsible
- 1. "A White Horse Covered In Blood" Released: July 30, 2024; 2. "Future Myopia" Released: August 28, 2024; 3. "At All Times" Released: September 25, 2024; 4. "Love As An Act Of Rebellion" Released: October 22, 2024

Highly Irresponsible is the debut studio album by American metalcore band Better Lovers. It was released on October 25th, 2024 through SharpTone Records. It is the second and last release to feature vocalist Greg Puciato. The album was self-produced by guitarist Will Putney.

== Background ==
After the release of their debut EP God Made Me An Animal in 2023, Better Lovers toured extensively in North America and Europe, but also made time to record and release a pair of singles, "Two Alive Amongst The Dead" and "The Flowering." Between those singles, the band confirmed to Revolver Magazine that "they have a whole album’s worth of new songs in the works." In January 2024, the band confirmed their debut full-length record would be released later in the year, and unlike God Made Me An Animal, wouldn't be a surprise release - "to do that with the sixteen new songs we’ve written would be unsafe."

The album was recorded in January and February 2024 at Will Putney's Graphic Nature Audio studio in Belleville, New Jersey. Social media posts from the band suggested as many as 17 tracks were recorded during that time, but only 10 were featured on the album, with an additional 2 as bonus tracks.

== Release ==
On July 30, 2024, Highly Irresponsible was announced for release on October 25, along with the album art and tracklist. The next day, the band released the lead single, "A White Horse Covered In Blood." Three more singles followed over the coming months: "Future Myopia" on August 28, "At All Times" on September 25, and "Love As An Act Of Rebellion" on October 22nd. The record was supported with a North American tour with Full of Hell, Gouge Away, Cloakroom and Spy during Fall 2024, the band's second annual Blissmas festival in Buffalo in December, and a United Kingdom tour with Frontierer and Greyhaven in January 2025.

A deluxe edition was released on November 13, 2025, with an alternate cover and two new songs: "Don't Forget To Say Please" (which had been released in September as a single) and "The Impossible End".

== Critical reception ==
Professional ratings
Review scores
Source	Rating
Blabbermouth.net	8/10 stars
Kerrang!	4/5 stars
Louder Sound	3/5 stars

Highly Irresponsible has received generally favorable reviews from critics. Reviews often make comparisons to releases from Every Time I Die and The Dillinger Escape Plan. Dom Lawson of Blabbermouth.net calls the album "Punishingly heavy at times, but smart and subtle too, 'Highly Irresponsible' is a sophisticated and schizophrenic metal record: perfect for these confused and bewildering times." Writing for Kerrang!, Sam Law observed "on one hand, the Buffalo supergroup’s bringing together of [the band members] consolidates decades of learning from heavy music’s cutting-edge and a fanbase ravenous to tear into some truly brilliant, unhinged sounds. On the other, it invites impossible comparisons to past records which will, frankly, never be topped." In his review for LouderSound, Matt Mills describes the album as "the sound of five cult stars clinging to the characteristics that made them cult stars, and it’d be hard to fault them for doing that. However, there’s no sense of rejuvenation that makes this feel like the new, refreshing force people crave. It’s a damn sight better than finding a dead dove in a bag, though."

== Track listing ==
All music written by Better Lovers.

No.	Title	Length
1.	"Lie Between The Lines"	4:29
2.	"Your Misplaced Self"	1:32
3.	"A White Horse Covered In Blood"	3:18
4.	"Future Myopia"	3:38
5.	"Deliver Us From Life"	4:28
6.	"Drowning In A Burning World"	2:44
7.	"Everything Was Put Here For Me"	3:26
8.	"Superman Died Paralyzed"	3:27
9.	"At All Times"	4:36
10.	"Love As An Act Of Rebellion"	3:19
Total length:		34:57

Deluxe edition bonus tracks
No.	Title	Length
11.	"The Impossible End"	3:09
12.	"Don't Forget To Say Please"	2:51
Total length:		40:57

== Personnel ==
Better Lovers

- Greg Puciato – vocals, lyrics
- Jordan Buckley – guitar
- Will Putney – guitar
- Steve Micciche – bass
- Clayton "Goose" Holyoak – drums

Production

- Will Putney – production, engineering, mixing, mastering
- Steve Seid – engineering
- Tommy Vasta – production assistant
- Don Phüry – artwork
