= The Burial Plot Bidding War =

EP by Every Time I Die
- Released: January 2000
- Recorded: November 1999
- Genre: Metalcore; screamo; mathcore
- Length: 19:17
- Label: Goodfellow, Undecided
- Producer: Doug White

Every Time I Die chronology
The Burial Plot Bidding War (2000)	Last Night in Town (2001)

Reissue Cover
- Undecided Records reissue 2004

Professional ratings
Review scores
Source	Rating
AllMusic	4/5 stars
Lambgoat	6/10

The Burial Plot Bidding War is the first EP by American metalcore band Every Time I Die. Songs "Prom Song" and "Your Touch Versus Death" were previously on their 1999 demo tape. The EP was first released on Good Fellow Records in January 2000, then reissued by Undecided Records in June 2004 with different artwork.

== Track listing ==
All lyrics are written by Keith Buckley; all music is composed by Jordan Buckley, Andrew Williams and Michael Novak Jr.

No.	Title	Length
1.	"The Emperor's New Clothes"	4:53
2.	"Your Touch Versus Death"	3:35
3.	"Prom Song"	3:51
4.	"Home Is Where You Hang Yourself"	4:09
5.	"Morphine Season"	3:29
Total length:		19:17

=== Notes ===
- At the beginning of "Prom Song" is an audio sample from Event Horizon which includes the Latin phrase "Liberate tutemet ex inferis".

== Personnel ==
Credits for The Burial Plot Bidding War adapted from the EP’s liner notes.

=== Every Time I Die ===
- Aaron Ratajczak – bass
- Andrew Williams – guitar
- Jordan Buckley – guitar; painting
- Keith Buckley – vocals; photography
- Mike "Ratboy" Novak – drums

=== Additional musicians ===
- Matt Dunn – backing vocals
- Andy Lennartz – backing vocals

=== Technical personnel ===
- Doug White – recording, mixing, mastering
- Sandy McCintosh – layout & design
- Paul Gresch – layout & design
- Chris Logan – layout & design
- Every Time I Die – layout & design
- John Lazarowich – photography
