= The Butcher and the Blade =

Professional wrestling tag team

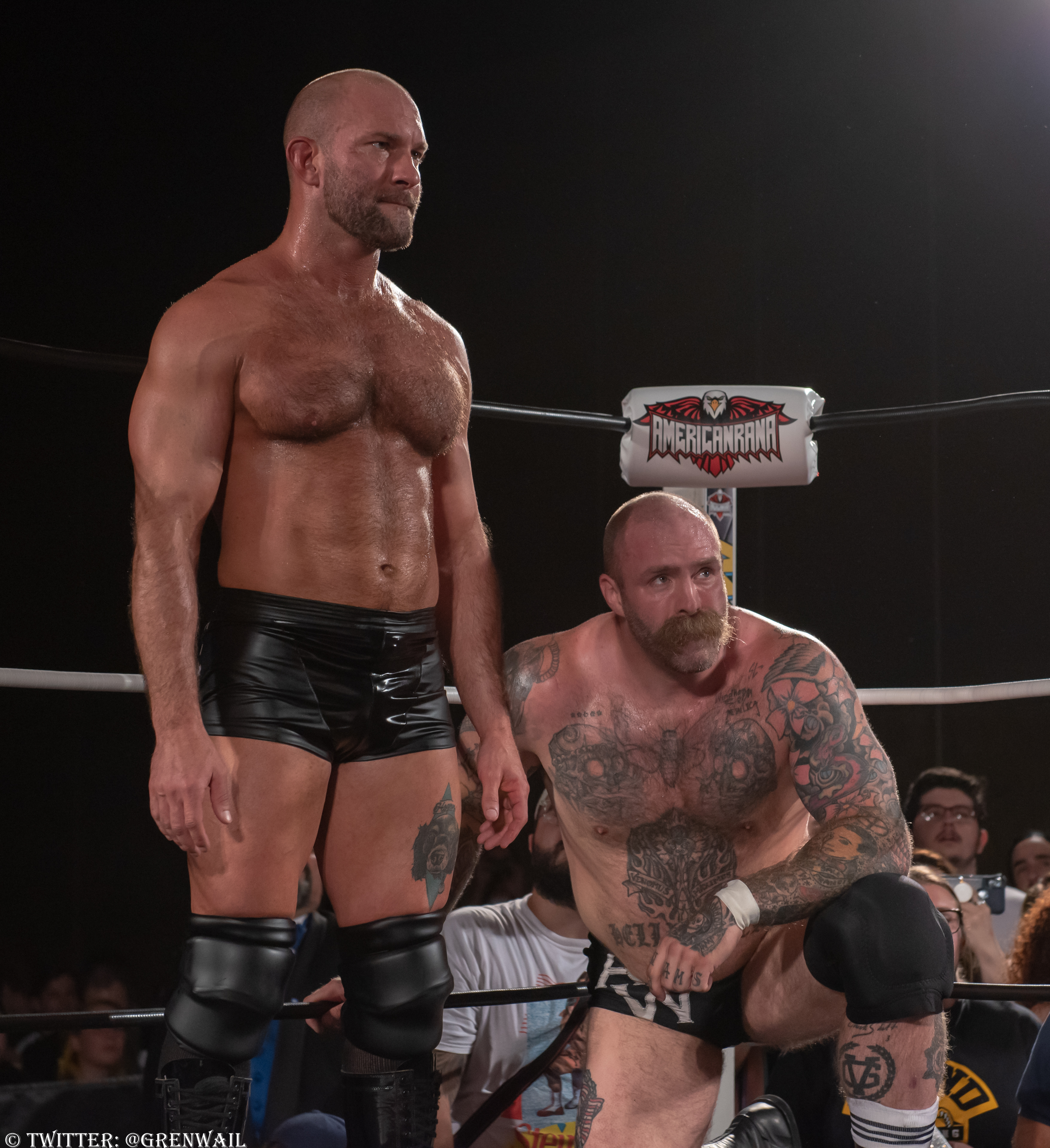
- The Butcher (right) and the Blade (left) in July 2019

Tag team
- Members: The Butcher / Andy Williams; The Blade / Braxton Sutter / Pepper Parks; The Bunny / Allie (manager)
- Name: The Butcher and the Blade
- Billed heights: The Butcher: 6 ft 3 in (1.91 m); The Blade: 6 ft 0 in (1.83 m)
- Combined billed weight: 485 lb (220 kg)
- Billed from: Buffalo, New York
- Debut: September 9, 2017
- Disbanded: September 5, 2026
- Years active: 2017–2026

The Butcher and the Blade were a professional wrestling tag team consisting of The Butcher (Andy Williams) and The Blade (Jesse Guilmette), and their manager The Bunny. They are best known for their time in All Elite Wrestling (AEW) from 2019 to 2026.

The team debuted in September 2017 and wrestled in the independent circuit, as well as several regional promotions such as Bar Wrestling, Beyond Wrestling, and Empire State Wrestling in the United States and Capital City Championship Combat (C4) and Smash Wrestling in Canada.

== History ==
=== Independent circuit (2017–2026) ===
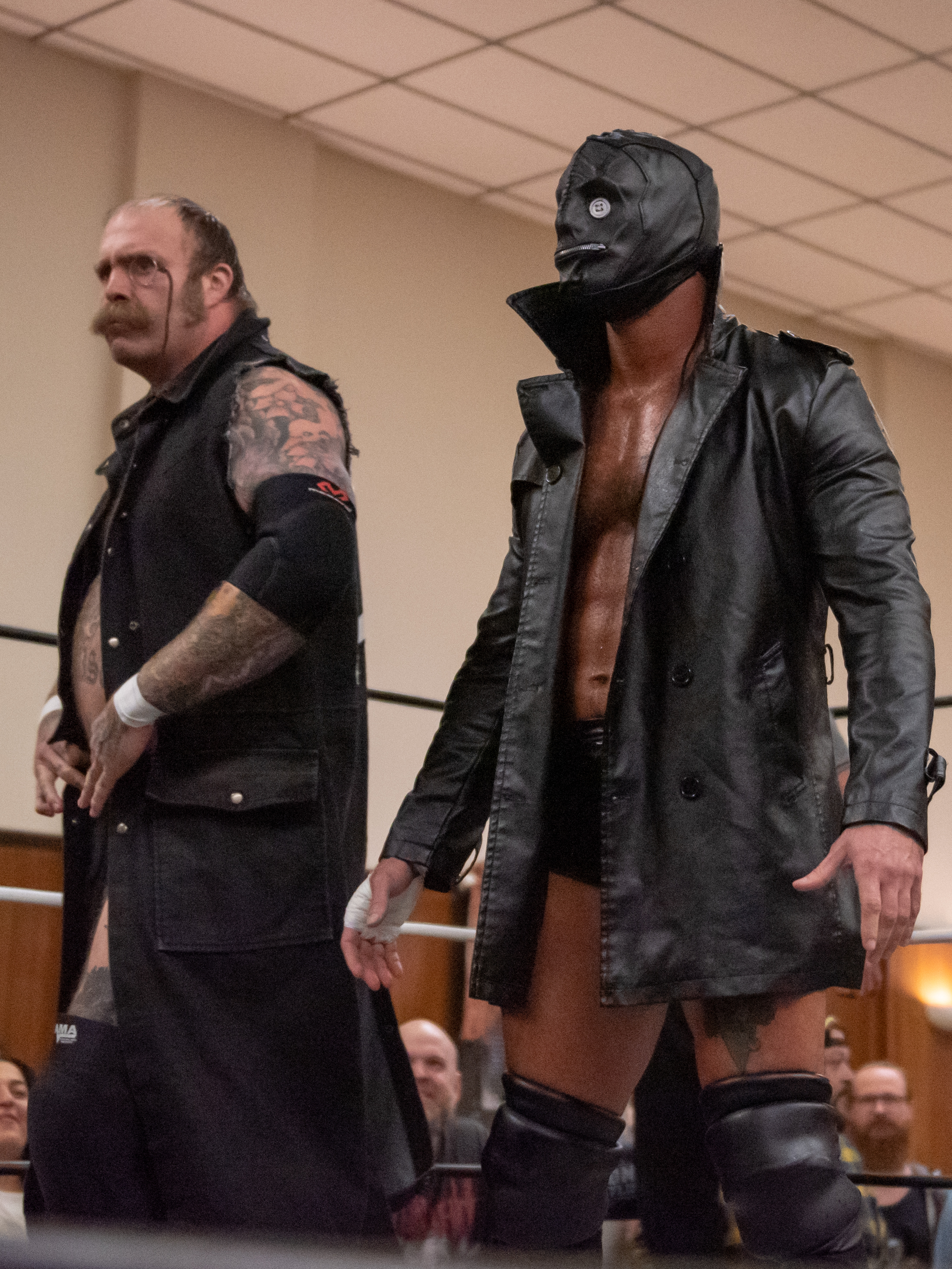
The Butcher and the Blade in 2019

The Butcher and the Blade made their debut in Pro Wrestling Rampage (PWR) on September 9, 2017, defeating the Upper Echelon (Colby Redd and P. B. Smooth) for the PWR Tag Team Championship. Starting in January 2018, they became a regular tag team in Buffalo, New York based Empire State Wrestling (ESW), calling the promotion their home and competing against teams involving Ultimo Dragon, Eddie Kingston, and Homicide. In April 2018, they made their Bar Wrestling debut teaming with Brody King in a losing effort against Eli Drake, Joey Ryan, and Kevin Martenson. They would later team with Tyler Bateman as "Two Butchers and the Blade" in Bar Wrestling's Trios Tournament losing to SoCal Uncensored (Christopher Daniels, Frankie Kazarian, and Scorpio Sky). On August 8, 2019, they made their Progress Wrestling debut losing to Aussie Open (Kyle Fletcher and Mark Davis) in a three-way tag team match with the Dark Order (Evil Uno and Stu Grayson).

They continued to wrestle together on the independent circuit until Butcher's death from on September 5, 2026.

=== All Elite Wrestling (2019–2026) ===
On the November 27, 2019 episode of AEW Dynamite, the Butcher and the Blade, led by a returning Allie as "the Bunny", made their All Elite Wrestling (AEW) debut when they attacked Cody Rhodes after coming from underneath the mat. It was later revealed by MJF and Wardlow that they were behind the attack on Cody, thus forming an alliance with the Butcher, the Blade, and the Bunny. They made their in-ring debut on the December 11, 2019 episode of Dynamite, defeating Cody and Q. T. Marshall. At Bash at the Beach, the Butcher and the Blade teamed with MJF and defeated Diamond Dallas Page, Dustin Rhodes, and Q. T. Marshall.

In May 2020, the Bunny ceased appearing with the Butcher and the Blade as Butcher and Blade continued teaming as well as appearing in the crowd during the COVID-19 pandemic. On the May 27 episode of Dynamite, Butcher and Blade attacked the Young Bucks after Nick Jackson accidentally superkicked Blade who was in the crowd. However, FTR came to the aid of the Young Bucks and helped them fend off Butcher and Blade. On the June 10 episode of Dynamite, Butcher and Blade were defeated by FTR. Butcher and Blade would then form an alliance with the Lucha Brothers as they defeated FTR and the Young Bucks at Fyter Fest. On the July 24 episode of Dynamite, Butcher and Blade were defeated by the Young Bucks in a Falls Count Anywhere match. On the August 22 episode of Dynamite, Butcher and Blade and the Lucha Brothers began showing dissension after they were defeated by Jurassic Express and Natural Nightmares. However, Eddie Kingston would help reunite the group. On the November 18 episode of Dynamite, the Lucha Brothers would turn against Butcher and Blade, as well as Kingston, after they attacked Pac.

Following Revolution in 2021, the Butcher and the Blade ended their alliance with Kingston and joined Matt Hardy, Private Party and others in the Hardy Family Office. The Butcher missed several months due to a thumb injury before returning at All Out. The Butcher and the Blade subsequently became number-one contenders for the AEW World Tag Team Championship, but lost to the Lucha Brothers. In November 2021, The Butcher suffered a torn biceps during a match against Chaos. Upon returning in January 2022, the Butcher became part of a storyline involving Andrade El Idolo, who eventually became the group's leader after Hardy's departure. The Butcher and the Blade later feuded with Darby Allin and the Hardys before their alliance with Andrade ended at Double or Nothing. Later that year, they aligned with Kip Sabian and began a recurring feud with Best Friends.

In May 2023, they began appearing regularly for Ring of Honor (ROH). In early 2024, the Blade was sidelined with a long-term injury, leading the Butcher to compete primarily in singles matches. He subsequently competed in singles matches against wrestlers including Swerve Strickland, Dustin Rhodes and Claudio Castagnoli. In June 2026, it was reported that their AEW contracts had expired, ending their nearly seven-year tenure with the promotion.

== Personal lives ==
Before making his professional wrestling debut in 2016, Andy Williams (The Butcher) was Every Time I Die's rhythm guitarist since he co-formed the band in 1998 until their breakup in January 2022. On September 5, 2026, Williams died at the age of 48 after collapsing during a match that night.

Jesse Guilmette (The Blade) married fellow professional wrestler Laura Dennis on September 21, 2013. They worked alongside each other in Impact Wrestling and All Elite Wrestling (AEW), where Dennis managed them in the latter promotion.

== Championships and accomplishments ==
- Pro Wrestling Rampage
  - PWR Tag Team Championship (1 time)
