= Ex Lives =

Studio album by Every Time I Die
- Released: March 6, 2012
- Recorded: Mid-2011
- Studio: JHOC, Pasadena, California
- Genre: Metalcore; Southern rock
- Length: 32:09
- Label: Epitaph
- Producer: Joe Barresi

Every Time I Die chronology
New Junk Aesthetic (2009)	Ex Lives (2012)	From Parts Unknown (2014)

Ex Lives is the sixth studio album by American metalcore band Every Time I Die.

== Background ==
In early 2011, vocalist Keith Buckley went on tour with the Damned Things. Ex Lives was recorded at JOHC in Pasadena, California; producer Joe Barresi also served as an engineer, with assistance from Morgan Stratton and Sean Oakley. Barresi later mixed the recordings. Josh Newton left the band five months after the recording, and was replaced by former bassist Stephen Micciche for touring. According to Buckley, for him to write the lyrics to "Underwater Bimbos from Outer Space" he had to "pay attention to the defeatism that the music suggested."

== Release ==
On January 3, 2012, Ex Lives was announced for release in March, and the album's track listing and artwork was revealed. In addition, a music video was released for "Underwater Bimbos from Outer Space", directed by Buckley. According to Blabbermouth.net, the video "features a barrage of startling visceral images which perfectly match the raging brutality of the track." Buckley said that to make the video he needed to "acknowledge the masochism I wrote of [in the lyrics] to myself. You don't get rewarded for your faith and you don't get celebrated for your heroism." On January 25, Epitaph Records began posting a series of videos to YouTube offering viewers a behind the scenes look into the making of Ex Lives.

On February 22, a music video was released for the song "Revival Mode", which was directed by Robert Schober. Buckley said the video had a "very ambiguously creepy David Lynch vibe to it" and that it features a "story line that exists outside of us as members of a band. It's dark and weird and while not completely adhering thematically to the lyrics, it sets a larger, broader mood which marries the song perfectly." Schober said the video is a "surrealist crime drama set on a lost highway...the story loosely interprets key phrases from the song...the guys were awesome and put up with many hours of freezing temperatures in the middle of the desert."

Ex Lives was made available for streaming on February 28, before being released on March 6 through Epitaph Records. In October, the band went on a tour of Australia. In January 2013, the band toured Australia as part of the Big Day Out festival.

== Reception ==
Professional ratings
Aggregate scores
Source	Rating
Metacritic	78/100
Review scores
Source	Rating
AbsolutePunk	9.5/10 stars
AllMusic	3.5/5 stars
Alternative Press	3/5 stars
The A.V. Club	B−
BBC Music	Very Favorable
Blare Magazine	4.5/5 stars
FasterLouder	(favorable)
The List	4/5 stars
Punknews.org	4/5 stars
Rock Sound	9/10 stars

"Ex Lives" debuted on the Billboard 200 at No. 20 selling around 14,300 copies. This is their highest charting position to date.

== Track listing ==
All songs written by Every Time I Die.

No.	Title	Length
1.	"Underwater Bimbos from Outer Space"	2:43
2.	"Holy Book of Dilemma"	1:49
3.	"A Wild, Shameless Plain"	1:49
4.	"Typical Miracle"	2:26
5.	"I Suck (Blood)"	2:56
6.	"Partying Is Such Sweet Sorrow"	3:12
7.	"The Low Road Has No Exits"	2:52
8.	"Revival Mode" (featuring John Christ of Danzig)	3:46
9.	"Drag King"	4:12
10.	"Touch Yourself"	2:18
11.	"Indian Giver"	4:10

Bonus tracks

No.	Title	Length
12.	"Grudge Music"	2:25
13.	"Business Casualty"	2:45
14.	"Starve an Artist, Cover Your Trash"	2:53

== Personnel ==
Personnel per booklet.

Every Time I Die

- Keith Buckley – vocals
- Jordan Buckley – guitar
- Andrew Williams – guitar
- Ryan "Leg$" Leger – drums
- Josh Newton – bass

Additional musician

- John Christ – high caffeine lead guitar on "Revival Mode"

Production

- Evil Joe Barresi – producer, engineer, mixing
- Morgan Stratton, Sean Oakley – assistant engineers
- Nick Pritchard – design
- Christopher Pike – photos

== Chart performance ==
Chart (2012)	Peak position
U.S. Billboard Vinyl Albums	3
