= Last Night in Town =

Studio album by Every Time I Die
- Released: August 14, 2001
- Recorded: March and April 2001
- Studios: Zing Studios, Westfield, Massachusetts
- Genres: Metalcore; screamo; mathcore
- Length: 33:54
- Label: Ferret
- Producer: Adam Dutkiewicz

Every Time I Die chronology
The Burial Plot Bidding War (2000)	Last Night in Town (2001)	Hot Damn! (2003)

2004 re-release cover

Last Night in Town is the first studio album by the American metalcore band Every Time I Die. After recording a demo, the band signed with the independent label Goodfellow Records in 2000 and released The Burial Plot Bidding War EP. The band signed to Ferret Music in mid-2000 and was planning to record its first album later in the year. After writing was completed in December of that year, the band went on several US tours until March 2001. In March and April, Last Night in Town was recorded with the Killswitch Engage guitarist Adam Dutkiewicz at Zing Studios in Westfield, Massachusetts. Following recording, the band went on tour with Killswitch Engage and Santa Sangre.

Last Night in Town was first released on August 14, 2001. The album received positive reviews with critics praising the band's chaotic sound showcased on the album. It was reissued in June 2004 with new artwork.

It was pressed on vinyl by Suburban Home Records in December 2006 as part of a box with Hot Damn! (2003) and Gutter Phenomenon (2005).

== Background ==
Every Time I Die was formed in 1998 by two brothers, the vocalist Keith Buckley and the guitarist Jordan Buckley. They brought in the guitarist Andy Williams and the drummer Michael "Ratboy" Novack. With a session musician on bass guitar, the band recorded a demo. With John McCarthy on bass guitar, the band toured across North America. With Aaron Ratajczak on bass guitar, the band signed with the independent label Goodfellow Records and released the EP The Burial Plot Bidding War in 2000. The band subsequently toured heavily across the east coast and Midwest. On July 10, it was announced that the band had signed with Ferret Music and would record its first album at the end of the summer or early fall, aiming for its release in the fall.

Two days later, the band revealed that the album would be titled Last Night in Town. On December 5, the band was planning to record Last Night in Town in February 2001, aiming for its release in the spring. On December 22, it was announced that the band had finished writing for Last Night in Town and that recording would take place in either February or March 2001. In December 2000 and January 2001, the band toured with Eighteen Visions. Following this, the band went on tour with Killswitch Engage. From early to mid-March, the band went on a short US tour with Premonitions of War.

== Production and composition ==
On March 21, the band began recording Last Night in Town with the producer Adam Dutkiewicz of Killswitch Engage. Recording took place at Zing Studios in Westfield, Massachusetts. On April 12, it was announced that recording was finished. On April 21 and 22, the group returned to the studio to mix the album.

Buckley said the album was "a chronological order of riffs that we wrote". Chris Gramlich of Exclaim! said the album was "conceptually darker" than The Burial Plot Bidding War, and said it was "lyrically and artistically, laced with black-humour, technical excursions, metallic breaks, [and] intertwining and eclectic guitar work". Jason D. Taylor of AllMusic says the album showcases the band "careening from metalcore crunch to exhausting screamo and even meandering into slightly emotional melodic singing" to the likes of Glassjaw. Mustapha Mond of Lambgoat said the album had a "darker, sludgier metal sound."

== Release ==
In July and August, the band toured with Killswitch Engage and Santa Sangre. After being planned for release in July, Last Night in Town was released on August 14 through Ferret Music. Chris Gramlich of Exclaim! called the artwork "striking" and it said it showed the band "decked out Reservoir Dogs-style, beating the tar out of some poor jerk". Buckley said it was "really dark, [and] really sarcastic". A music video was released for "The Logic of Crocodiles", which featured the wrestler Matt Cross.

== Reception and aftermath ==
Professional ratings
Review scores
Source	Rating
AllMusic	4.5/5 stars
Lambgoat	9/10
Punknews	4.5/5 stars

The AllMusic reviewer Jason D. Taylor called the album "a cathartic, chaotic release", and continued, "The listener will go from being stunned to outright jaw-dropping incredulity." He said that the record was very comparable to Drowningman in the regard that both bands are able to "flawlessly twist your mind into a pretzel and then straighten it back out with the occasional melody". Taylor concluded his review by saying that the "reluctance to remove the album from your stereo is surely proof enough that this is one of the most potentially amazing bands inhabiting the metalcore scene". Mustapha Mond of Lambgoat said the album was "as peppy as tough, crazy hardcore can get. And on top of the boots-rocking beat, ETID layers breakdown after breakdown". He said it "keeps up the rocking for ten powerful tracks, and manages to put enough artistry into them that any one, listened to alone, will knock your socks off". In a review for Punknews, Brian Shultz said the album brought "the terms "rhetoric" and "caustic" each to a whole new level. He noted that the band "stray from choruses like they were acting out magnetism laws" and praised Buckley's "penetrating screams and joyously wild yells". He mentioned that the guitars "flip-flop between frenetic riffing and hyperactive decrescendos. ... it's metalcore that does not let the fuck up".

Last Night in Town was re-released on June 21, 2004, with new artwork. The album was reissued on vinyl as part of a box set along with Hot Damn! (2003) and Gutter Phenomenon (2005). The box set was released on December 12, 2006, by the independent label Suburban Home Records.

In 2010, Buckley said he re-listened to the album and said, "It's hard to play, I don't know how I even wrote some of that stuff." In 2013, he said the album was "just 50 riffs and none of them repeat and it's almost like, what were we thinking?".

Jim Smallman of TeamRock ranked Last Night in Town as his least favorite Every Time I Die album, calling it "A fine debut, but the band were to head on to better things."

== Track listing ==
No.	Title	Length
1.	"Emergency Broadcast Syndrome"	2:00
2.	"Jimmy Tango's Method"	3:40
3.	"Here's Lookin' at You"	3:44
4.	"Punch-Drunk Punk Rock Romance" (featuring Howard Jones from Blood Has Been Shed)	4:36
5.	"Enter Without Knocking and Notify the Police"	2:01
6.	"The Logic of Crocodiles"	3:50
7.	"Pincushion"	3:18
8.	"Nothing Dreadful Ever Happens"	3:43
9.	"California, Gracefully"	2:53
10.	"Shallow Water Blackout"	2:55

== Personnel ==
- Keith Buckley – vocals
- Jordan Buckley – lead guitar
- Andrew Williams – rhythm guitar
- Aaron Ratajczak – bass, piano on "Nothing Dreadful Ever Happens"
- Michael "Ratboy" Novak Jr. – drums
- Howard Jones – backing vocals on "Punch-Drunk Punk Rock Romance"
- Alan Walke - cover photography
