= Andy Williams (guitarist) =

American guitarist and professional wrestler (1977–2026)

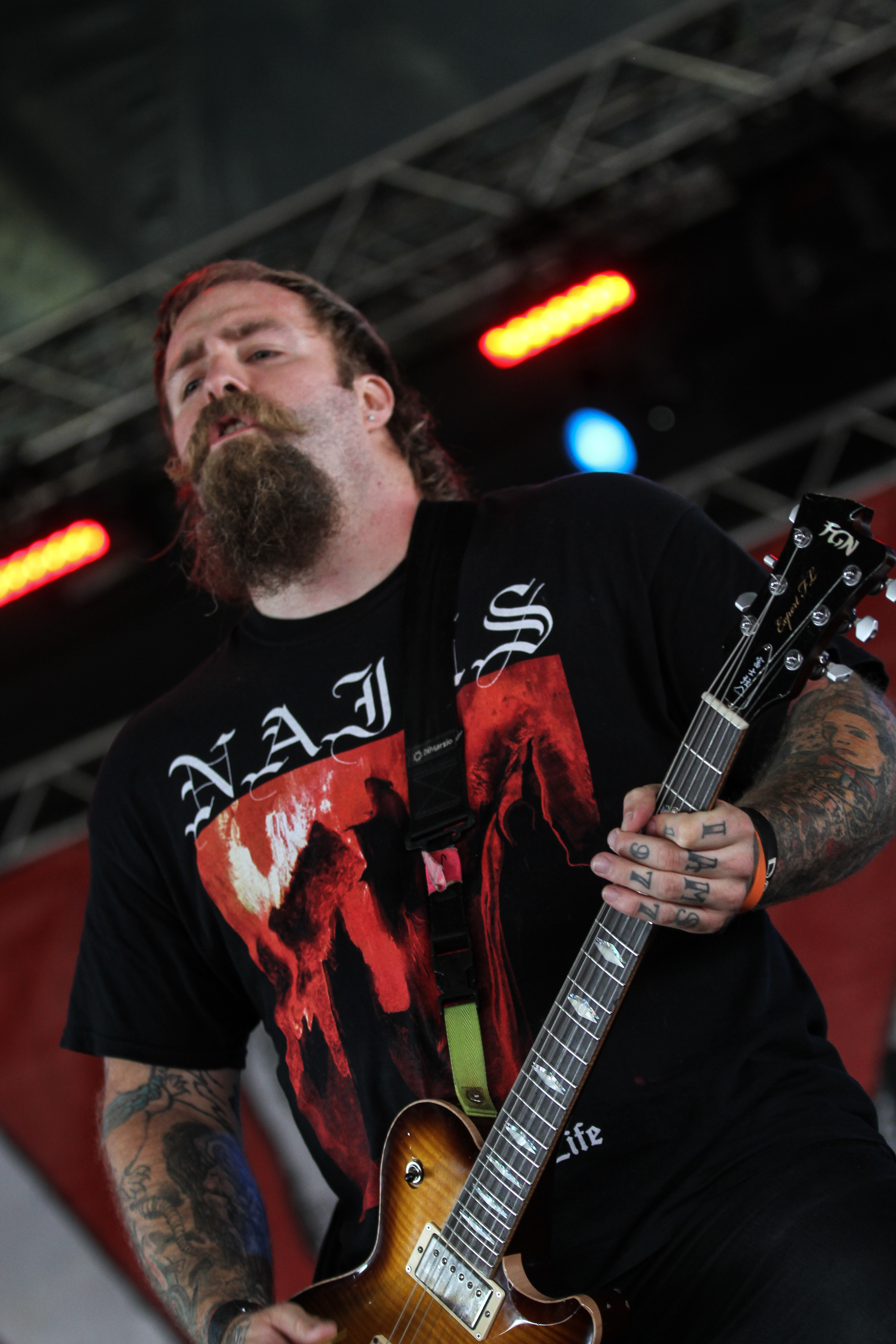
- Williams in 2013

Background information
- Born: Andrew Williams; December 12, 1977; Buffalo, New York, U.S.
- Origin: North Tonawanda, New York, U.S.
- Died: September 5, 2026 (aged 48) Pittsburgh, Pennsylvania, U.S.
- Genres: Metalcore, hardcore punk, Southern rock
- Occupations: Musician, professional wrestler
- Instrument: Guitar
- Years active: 1998–2026
- Labels: Goodfellow; Ferret; Epitaph
- Formerly of: Every Time I Die; Atomic Rule
- Professional wrestling career
- Ring names: Andy Williams; Ballsy Malone; Billy Goat Williams; The Butcher
- Billed height: 6 ft 3 in (191 cm)
- Billed weight: 273 lb (124 kg)
- Billed from: Buffalo, New York
- Trained by: Grapplers Anoymous; Brandon Thurston; Josh Barnett; Mikey Everynite; Pepper Parks
- Debut: March 20, 2016

Andrew Williams (December 12, 1977 – September 5, 2026) was an American musician and professional wrestler. He was best known as the rhythm guitarist of the metalcore band Every Time I Die.

As a professional wrestler, he was best known for his time in All Elite Wrestling (AEW) under the ring name The Butcher, where he worked as one-half of a tag team with The Blade.

== Musical career ==
Williams had aspired to be a professional wrestler and trained at Renegade Wrestling Association in Ontario, Canada for six months, until he sustained a knee injury. During the layoff, he learned to play the guitar. The first hardcore bands he played in were Sirhan and Soiled who have both released demos and appear on several compilations.

In 1998, Williams formed Every Time I Die alongside lead guitarist Jordan Buckley and drummer Michael Novak. He appeared on every release that the band did, and had not missed a live show, until January 2020, when he wrestled Diamond Dallas Page and Dustin Rhodes at AEW Bash at the Beach. From January to March, Every Time I Die had written and recorded their ninth album, and had been expected to tour the album in June, supporting Parkway Drive and Hatebreed, but this was delayed due to the COVID-19 pandemic. Since he could not tour with the band, he was able to continue working for All Elite Wrestling (AEW), as they are based in Jacksonville, Florida, and Florida deemed wrestling as essential business critical to the state's economy. On January 17, 2022, Every Time I Die announced they had broken up.

In 2023, Williams formed Atomic Rule, alongside bassist Travis Bennington, and the band released a three-song demo in September 2025, as well as a three-song extended play in December 2025. Prior to his death, Williams spoke of having finished writing and recording new music.

== Professional wrestling career ==
=== Training (2010–2015) ===
In the mid-2010s, Williams resumed his training with Josh Barnett, initially as a workout session. He continued working with Barnett, but only sporadically, as he did not live in California. He began attending Grapplers Anonymous, based in Lackawanna, and received further training from long-time friend and professional wrestler Jesse Guilmette.

=== Independent circuit (2015–2026) ===
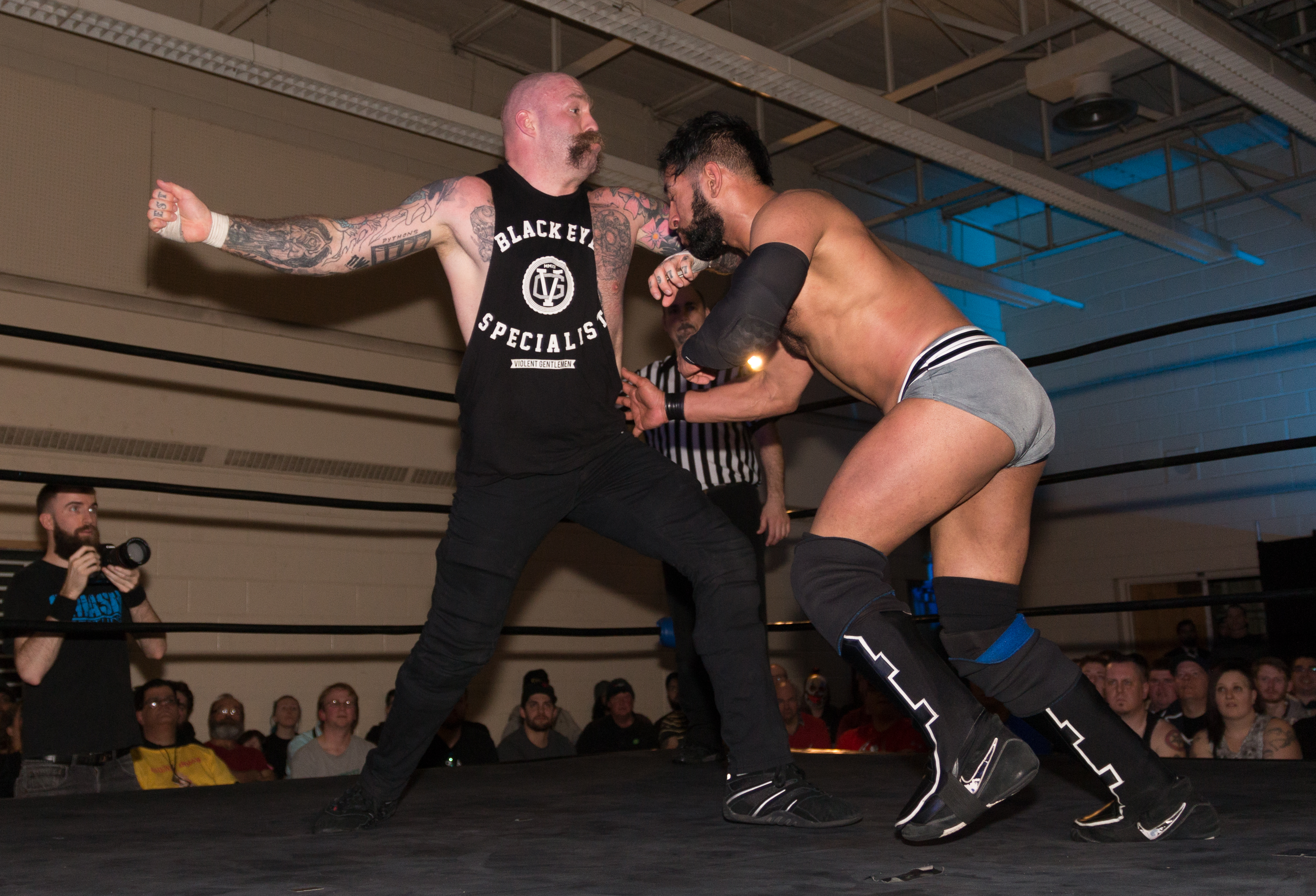
Williams (left) wrestling Tarik at a Smash Wrestling event in 2016

During the summer of 2015, he started working on the independent circuit, and made run-ins at Smash Wrestling in Toronto where he chokeslammed Tarik, and at Progress Wrestling, where he powerbombed Jimmy Havoc through a table. His first tag match was on an Interspecies Wrestling Halloween show, partnering Wes in a dark match, and defeating Los Dumbfucks. In February 2016, he returned to Smash Wrestling, and had another confrontation with Tarik, who laid him out in the ring. His first singles match was confirmed the following month after the show, but at Any Given Sunday 4, he was defeated by Tarik. During the match, he tore his meniscus, which he had surgery for, before going on tour with Every Time I Die ten days later.

In March 2017, Williams appeared at Joey Janela's Spring Break, successfully teaming with Penelope Ford in an intergender tag team match against Guilmette (under his Braxton Sutter ring name) and his wife Allie. Janela had suggested that Williams should wrestle either Nikolai Volkoff or Glacier at the event, but he declined, preferring the intergender matchup instead. In September, Williams and Guilmette began regularly teaming with each other, and in their first match at a Pro Wrestling Rampage event, they won the PWR Tag Team Championship, defeating the Upper Echelon (Colby Redd and P. B. Smooth). However, this reign was short-lived, lasting 63 days. In their first defence of the title, Williams was absent and was replaced by JJ Rumham (as he was playing in Newcastle during the Low Teens tour); the pairing of Guilmette and Rumham were defeated by the Homewreckers (Anthony Gaines and Jet Rebel). Known as the Butcher and the Blade, Williams and Guilmette predominately wrestled in promotions across the Northeast, as well as in Ottawa, where Capital City Championship Combat (C4) is based.

=== All Elite Wrestling / Ring of Honor (2019–2026) ===
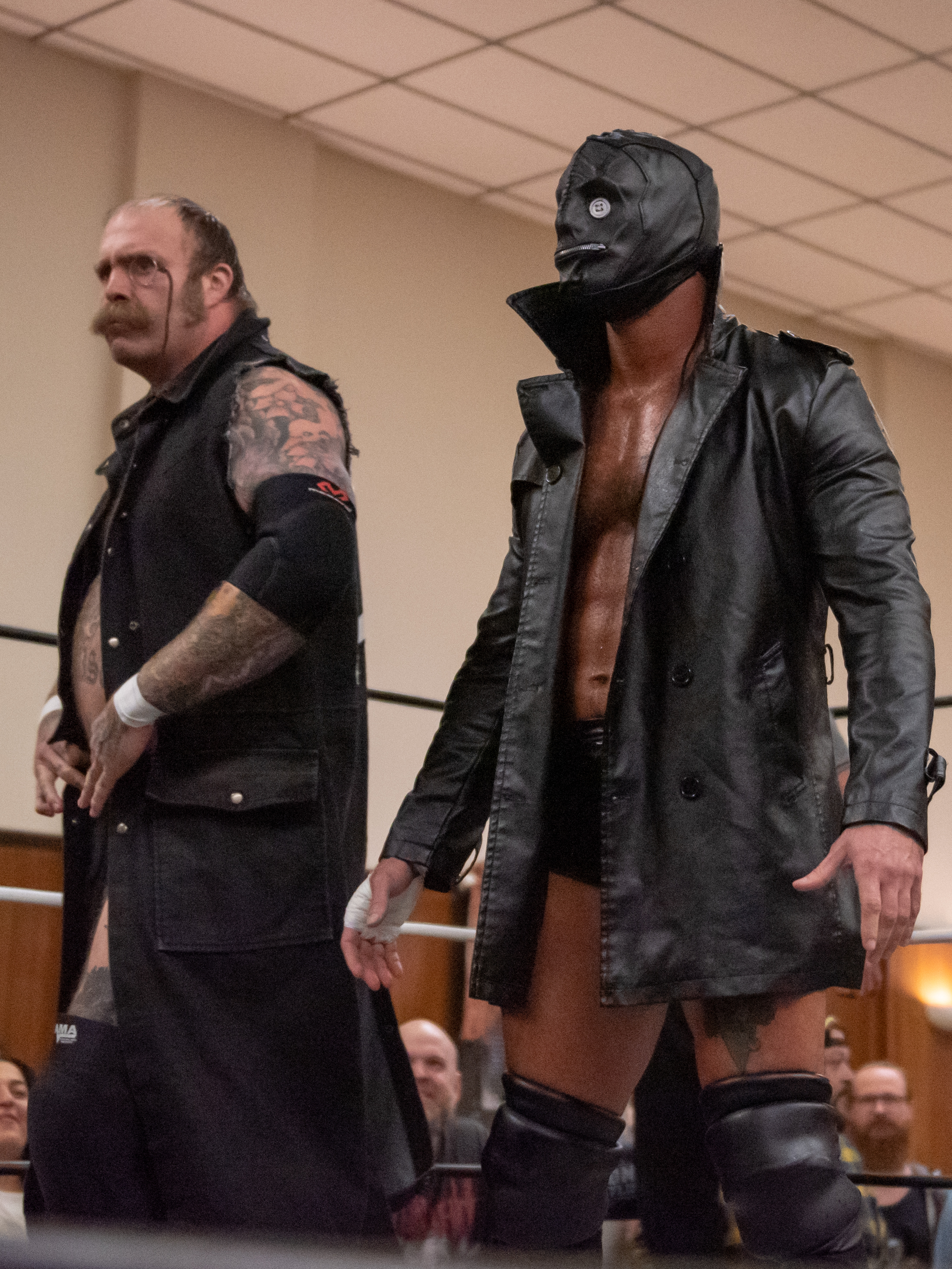
The Butcher (left) and his tag team partner The Blade (right) in 2019

On the November 27, 2019 episode of Dynamite, Williams made his All Elite Wrestling (AEW) debut as the Butcher, attacking Cody alongside the Blade and the Bunny. It was later revealed that the Butcher and the Blade had been hired by MJF. The team subsequently feuded with Jurassic Express before aligning with the Lucha Brothers and Eddie Kingston in 2020. The alliance later dissolved, with the Butcher and the Blade siding with Kingston and feuding with Death Triangle.

Following Revolution in 2021, the Butcher and the Blade ended their alliance with Kingston and joined Matt Hardy, Private Party and others in the Hardy Family Office. The Butcher won a battle royal for a TNT Championship opportunity, but was defeated by Darby Allin. He later missed several months due to a thumb injury before returning at All Out. The Butcher and the Blade subsequently became number-one contenders for the AEW World Tag Team Championship, but lost to the Lucha Brothers. In November 2021, Williams suffered a torn biceps during a match against Chaos. Weeks later, Every Time I Die broke up, prompting Williams to pursue professional wrestling full-time.

Upon returning in January 2022, the Butcher became part of a storyline involving Andrade El Idolo, who eventually became the group's leader after Hardy's departure. The Butcher and the Blade later feuded with Darby Allin and the Hardys before their alliance with Andrade ended at Double or Nothing. Later that year, they aligned with Kip Sabian and began a recurring feud with Best Friends.

Throughout 2023, the Butcher remained involved in various battle royals and title opportunities, including a challenge for the AEW International Championship against Orange Cassidy, which he lost. Beginning in May 2023, Butcher also began appearing regularly for Ring of Honor (ROH), primarily in tag team and multi-man matches. In early 2024, the Blade was sidelined with a long-term injury, leading the Butcher to compete primarily in singles matches. He subsequently competed in singles matches against wrestlers including Swerve Strickland, Dustin Rhodes and Claudio Castagnoli. Butcher's final match for AEW took place on the February 23, 2025 episode of Collision, where he lost to Gabe Kidd.

In June 2026, it was reported that the Blade and the Butcher's AEW contracts had expired, ending their nearly seven-year tenure with the promotion. It was later revealed that Butcher remained in talks with AEW for a potential backstage role with the promotion.

== Personal life ==
On Renee Paquette's podcast The Sessions, in 2022, Williams revealed he had dyslexia.

== Death ==
On September 5, 2026, Williams collapsed following a match at an Enjoy Wrestling event in Millvale, Pennsylvania. The remainder of the event was subsequently cancelled and he was rushed to Allegheny General Hospital, where he was pronounced dead at the age of 48. On September 6, the Allegheny County Medical Examiner's Office confirmed Williams' death.

=== Tributes and reactions ===
Following the announcement of his death, numerous wrestlers and musicians paid tribute to Williams on social media, including Williams' former Every Time I Die bandmates. Vocalist Keith Buckley described Williams as someone who "...made people feel like they belonged". My Chemical Romance also dedicated their performance of "Boy Division" to Williams during their concert the following night.

On September 6, 2026, a day after his death, Malakai Black won the Progress Men's World Championship and dedicated his victory to Williams. All Elite Wrestling, the professional wrestling promotion where he worked from 2019 to 2026, honored him during their Rebel Heart special episode of Dynamite on September 9. On the September 8 tapings of Ring of Honor, ROH and AEW owner Tony Khan opened the show with a ten-bell salute to Williams. The September 12 episode of Collision was a special episode dedicated to Williams, titled "A Tribute to "The Butcher" Andy Williams". The memorial show featured a ten-bell salute, and in the main event, fellow Buffalo native Daniel Garcia won a battle royal to earn the right to choose any charity to donate $100,000 to in Williams' name. Garcia chose to donate the money to MusiCares.

Ganon Jones Jr., who wrestled Williams during his last match, retired from professional wrestling due to the incident.

A public memorial service was held on September 27, 2026, where it was announced that a memorial statue and bench would be built in Williams' hometown of North Tonawanda, New York at Gratwick Park. Tragically that same day, fellow wrestler and friend of Williams, Benjamin Satterley, also known as Pac, died at the age of 40.

== Discography ==
=== Every Time I Die ===
- Last Night in Town (2001)
- Hot Damn! (2003)
- Gutter Phenomenon (2005)
- The Big Dirty (2007)
- New Junk Aesthetic (2009)
- Ex Lives (2012)
- From Parts Unknown (2014)
- Low Teens (2016)
- Radical (2021)

=== Atomic Rule ===
- With Skull Crushing Force EP (2025)
- The Golden Rose EP (2026)

== Championships and accomplishments ==
- Pro Wrestling Illustrated
  - Ranked number 315 of the top 500 singles wrestlers in the PWI 500 in 2020
- Pro Wrestling Rampage
  - PWR Tag Team Championship (1 time) – with Braxton Sutter

== See also ==
- List of premature professional wrestling deaths
