= Gutter Phenomenon =

Studio album by Every Time I Die
- Released: August 23, 2005
- Recorded: March–May 2005
- Studios: IIWII, Weehawken, New Jersey; The Machine Shop, Hoboken, New Jersey
- Genres: Hardcore punk; Southern rock; metalcore
- Length: 34:22
- Label: Ferret
- Producer: Machine

Every Time I Die chronology
Hot Damn! (2003)	Gutter Phenomenon (2005)	The Big Dirty (2007)

Gutter Phenomenon is the third studio album by American hardcore punk band Every Time I Die.

It was cited as the band's best album by Bryan Rolli of Loudwire in 2025.

== Background ==
Following tours of Japan and Australia in February 2005, the band planned to finish up the writing stage for their next album. On March 16, the band announced they almost completed the writing process. In addition, the band said they were looking for a new bassist to fill in Steven Micciche's position, who had left earlier in the year. Later in the month, the band began recording Gutter Phenomenon with producer Machine. On April 1, Kevin Falk of Between the Buried and Me was announced as the band's new bassist. On May 23, it was announced that the band was wrapping up the recording process.

== Recording and composition ==
Gutter Phenomenon was produced and mixed by Machine with engineering done by Jakob Nygard. Recording was done using Pro-Tools, which was handled by Nygard and Jerry Farley. Drums were tracked at IIWII Studios in Weehawken, New Jersey, and were engineered by Nygard and Machine with assistance from Sal Mormando. Guitars and vocals were tracked at the Machine Shop in Hoboken, New Jersey, and were engineered by Nygard and Machine. The album was mixed at the Machine Shop and mastered at Joe Gastwirt Mastering.

The band were listening back to their older material and contemplating the achievements they had done up to that point, including touring with Ozzfest and Warped Tour. Vocalist Keith Buckley said "we did so much promotion for Hot Damn before and after it came out that we never stopped to listen to it and see if we had grown." He believed that the band members had the same train of thought where "you really can't move on until you hate everything you've done before." Buckley mentioned that a lot of groups find a niche "and put the same ingredients into every soup." He said the band was aware that they had grown up and became more accepting of the music they heard when they were younger, mentioning classic rock specifically. On Gutter Phenomenon, the group "embraced that. We tried to hide it before because we didn't think it had any room in the 'hardcore community.'" Gerard Way of My Chemical Romance contributes vocals to "Kill the Music", while Daryl Palumbo of Glassjaw added his vocals to "Champing at the Bit".

== Release ==
On May 23, 2005, Gutter Phenomenon was announced for release in three months' time; its artwork and track listing was posted online. On June 22, the band announced that Falk had been kicked out for unspecified personal reasons. In the same announcement, they said Chris Byrnes of Nora would be Falk's replacement. On July 6, 2005, "Bored Stiff" was posted online. In late July, MTV reported that actor Michael Madsen would feature in an upcoming video for "Kill the Music". Director Darren Doane, who at the time had recently filmed a movie with Madsen, received a message from the band about featuring Madsen in a music video. Doane called the band and said Madsen was up for the idea. According to Chris Harris of MTV, in the video for "Kill the Music", Madsen "plays a callous music video director, prone to sudden bursts of unbridled rage." During the video, guitarist Jordan Buckley "appears to ruin the shot, and Madsen launches into attack mode, wailing on the rocker like a pitbull locked in bathroom with a poodle." Upon returning home from the video shoot, Madsen called Doane "and was anxious to know if we thought he had done well — like he was contemplating whether he could have done better", according to Buckley. Buckley "had to call him at his hotel room and reassure him he'd done a good job." The video was posted online on July 7, 2006.

On August 3, 2005, "Champin' at the Bit" was made available for streaming via an E-card. Gutter Phenomenon was released on August 23, 2005 through Ferret Records. Three days later, the "Kill the Music" video was posted online. On April 6, 2006, the band filmed a music video in Los Angeles for "The New Black" with director Dan Rush. Buckley said Rush "has such an awesome sense of humor." Typically, the band might come up with an idea, and a director would say "'Cool, let's do it,' and it ends up being kind of funny." However, with Rush, he would say "'That's not funny enough,' and shoot us down. We had a verbal toss-about, and we came up with some amazing ideas for this video." According to Blabbermouth.net, the video showcases the band at a 1970s party "attended by Evel Knievel, go-go dancers, a half-naked man in rainbow suspenders and a guy playing with a Rubik's Cube". On June 13, a deluxe edition of Gutter Phenomenon was released; the DVD included an edited version of their forthcoming video album Shit Happens, which consisted of footage from their tour with Bleeding Through.

At the end of their set at Dirtfest on August 19, the band announced that Byrnes would be leaving the band. Byrnes said the split was "amicable, but something that I had to do. For the sake of not stirring up controversy I won't go into the details. All I can really say is that it was not an easy decision to have to make." Buckley said Byrnes departure was due to money, "He really couldn't afford it on our touring schedule and salary". He was replaced by former the Chariot member Keller Harbin. The Shit Happens video album was released on October 31, 2006. The album was reissued on vinyl as part of a box set along with Last Night in Town (2001) and Hot Damn! (2003). The box set was released on December 12 through Suburban Home Records. Both Hot Damn! and Gutter Phenomenon were repressed in September 2008.

== Touring ==
In early June, the band performed at the Flame Fest: Gods of Metalcore 2005 festival in Italy. In June and July, the band participated in the Sounds of the Underground tour. In September and October, the band embarked on a US tour with High on Fire, the Red Chord, the Chariot and Esoteric. Following the album's release, the band went on a US tour with It Dies Today, Haste the Day, A Life Once Lost and Emanuel. In November, the band went on a UK tour with My Chemical Romance. Every Time I Die went to mainland Europe with My Chemical Romance, and then a tour of Australia with Parkway Drive. In January 2006, the band supported Story of the Year on their headlining US tour. Prior to the start of the tour, the band crashed their tour bus, resulting in them not joining the tour until January 11. From February to April, the group toured across North America with Bleeding Through. In early May, the band performed at the Bamboozle festival. Later in the month, the band toured the UK with support from Protest the Hero and It Dies Today.

The band went on the 2006 edition of the Warped Tour. While on the tour, the band was initially attracting crows of 300 people, however, as it continued they were drawing 6,000 people. Guitarist Andy Williams said that unlike Sounds of the Underground and Ozzfest, "you're playing in front of thousands of people that have never heard you", mentioning people who were accustomed to bands such as My Chemical Romance and Fall Out Boy. "And then you have [us], these jerks running around onstage, and they haven't seen anything like us. It was a shock to the system for them, and we started picking up fans." In September and October, the band supported Alexisonfire on their tour of Canada, before supporting Underoath on their US fall headlining tour. In October and November, the band supported Atreyu on their tour of the US. During the tour, the band performed at Saints & Sinners Festival.

== Reception ==
Professional ratings
Review scores
Source	Rating
AbsolutePunk	(87%)
AllMusic	3/5 stars
Blabbermouth.net	7.5/10
Drowned in Sound	6/10
Exclaim!	Favorable
Lambgoat	7/10 stars

By August 2006, the album had sold over 68,000 copies. Revolver picked the album as their Album of the Year.

== Track listing ==
All tracks are written by Every Time I Die, except "Apocalypse Now and Then" and "The New Black", written by Every Time I Die and Kevin Falk.

No.	Title	Length
1.	"Apocalypse Now and Then"	2:33
2.	"Kill the Music" (featuring Gerard Way of My Chemical Romance)	3:14
3.	"Bored Stiff"	2:18
4.	"Easy Tiger"	3:02
5.	"Tusk and Temper"	3:55
6.	"The New Black"	2:52
7.	"Champing at the Bit" (featuring Daryl Palumbo of Glassjaw and Head Automatica)	3:57
8.	"Gloom and How it Gets That Way"	1:57
9.	"Guitarred and Feathered"	3:56
10.	"L'Astronaut"	3:05
11.	"Pretty Dirty"	3:33

== Personnel ==
Personnel per deluxe edition booklet.

Every Time I Die

- Keith Buckley – vocals
- Jordan Buckley – lead guitar
- Andrew Williams – rhythm guitar
- Mike Novak – drums

Additional musician

- Kevin Falk – bass

Production

- Machine – producer, mixing, engineer
- Jakob Nygard – engineer, Pro-Tools
- Sal Mormando – assistant
- Jerry Farley – Pro-Tools
- Switzerland – art direction, design

== Chart positions ==
Album - Billboard (North America)

Year	Chart	Position
2005	The Billboard 200	71
2005	Top Independent Albums	10
