= New Junk Aesthetic =

Studio album by Every Time I Die
- Released: September 15, 2009
- Recorded: April and June 2009
- Studios: Omen Room, Garden Grove, California; Castle Oaks, Calabasas, California
- Genres: Metalcore; southern rock; hardcore punk; post-hardcore
- Length: 31:51
- Label: Epitaph
- Producer: Steve Evetts

Every Time I Die chronology
The Big Dirty (2007)	New Junk Aesthetic (2009)	Ex Lives (2012)

New Junk Aesthetic is the fifth studio album by American metalcore band Every Time I Die. It was released on September 15, 2009. It was the band's first album to be released by their new record label, Epitaph Records. The album artwork was created by guitarist Jordan Buckley.

== Background ==
In June 2008, the band announced that Josh Newton of From Autumn to Ashes had joined them as the permanent bassist. A month later, it was announced that the band were unsigned. Vocalist Keith Buckley said that The Big Dirty was "the last thing we had to deliver for Ferret so we are in limbo". He mentioned that the band were in the process of talking with labels, "I think people will be very pleased to know that it looks like we will not be signing with a major." The band were planning to write their next album at the end of the year. On January 2, it was reported that the band had signed to independent label Epitaph Records. On January 12, the band began writing their next album.

On February 11, the band's signing with Epitaph Records was formally announced. Buckley said that "To be given the opportunity to start anew after existing for over ten years in an environment that has chewed up and spit out most bands in a quarter of that time is nothing short of a miracle." He said that the band's first release for the label would be recorded in the spring with producer Steve Evetts and "thus far is proving to capture the excitement of our new lease on life and the aggressive energy we are notorious for." In an interview in February, Buckley mentioned that the band had written two songs. Despite being a band for ten years, he said that to still have "fresh ideas is a little relieving." In February and March 2009, the band toured Australia as part of the Soundwave festival.

== Recording and composition ==
The band began recording New Junk Aesthetic on April 1 with producer Steve Evetts. Recording took place at Castle Oaks in Calabasas, California. Evetts engineered and mixed the recordings. Additional engineering, as well as editing, was performed by Allan Hessler, with assistance by Matthew Mesiano. In May, the band supported Gallows on their tour of the UK. During the tour, Buckley said the album was not done and that there were parts that needed to be finished following the tour's conclusion. Buckley was "surprised" with how the album was shaping up, "I did not know that we had it in us to be this fast and heavy anymore. ... [With] a lot of bands ... you can pinpoint the exact time ... [they] started going through the motions. We are not going through the motions on this record at all, it is a legit punk record."

On June 7, the band said they were back in the studio, recording at Omen Room Studios in Garden Grove, California. Here, the band recorded Newton's bass parts. On June 11, the band said that Matt Caughthran of the Bronx had stopped by the studio, contributing vocals to "The Sweet Life". On June 16, Buckley announced that the recording process for New Junk Aesthetic was finished. On June 27, Pete Wentz of Fall Out Boy posted that he had added vocals to "After One Quarter of a Revolution". In addition, Greg Puciato of the Dillinger Escape Plan added vocals to "The Marvelous Slut". Alan Douches mastered the recordings at West West Side Music. The album's sound has been described as hardcore punk, metalcore, post-hardcore, and Southern rock.

== Release ==
On June 28, 2009, the band performed at S.C.E.N.E. Music Festival in Canada. On June 29, drummer Mike Novak announced that he had left the band, citing "personal conflicts" and mentioning he was getting himself "out of an uncomfortable, unhealthy situation". The following day, the band said "For the past year it has felt like we were playing with a drum machine or a pre recorded backing track. He completely shut off communication with us ... he simply was not a part of us anymore mentally or emotionally." On July 8, "The Marvelous Slut" was released as a free download. On July 13, New Junk Aesthetic was announced for release in September. In addition, the album's track listing and artwork was revealed. The artwork was created by guitarist Jordan Buckley, to which Keith called it "a superb job". Blabbermouth.net said the artwork features "a mythological god covering his eyes with see-through hands". Later in the month, the band filmed a music video for "Wanderlust". On August 17, "Wanderlust" was posted on the group's Myspace profile. On August 22, the band performed a show with new drummer Ryan Leger of Dead and Divine. On August 25, the music video for "Wanderlust" was released, directed by Chris Sims. According to Chart Attack, the video features Buckley "stuck in one gigantic hall with many doors, and every one he walks through features some kind of weird, sketched world of art from New Junk Aesthetic on the other side." New Junk Aesthetic was released on September 15 through Epitaph Records. The album included 11 tracks, while the deluxe edition added two more.

In September and October, the band went on a US tour with Bring Me the Horizon, with support from Oh, Sleeper and Architects. In November and December, the band went on the Taste of Chaos tour in the UK and Europe, playing alongside Killswitch Engage, In Flames, Maylene and the Sons of Disaster and Dead by April. In January 2010, the band went on the Boys of Summer tour in Australia with 50 Lions, Trap Them and Mary Jane Kelly. On March 8, the band released a music video for "After One Quarter of a Revolution". In March and April, the band went on a US tour alongside Four Year Strong, Polar Bear Club and Trapped Under Ice. In May, the band went on a tour of the US with Norma Jean and Cancer Bats. In July and August, the band performed on Warped Tour. In September and October, the band went on the Hell on Earth tour in Europe alongside Terror, All Shall Perish, Down to Nothing and Thick as Blood. In April 2011, the band appeared at Groezrock. The following month, the band headlined Bled Fest. In September and October, the band headlined the Counter Revolution tour in Australia with support from the Acacia Strain and the Word Alive. On October 13, it was announced that Newton left the band to pursue a career. He was replaced by Stephen Micciche, who was originally the band's third bassist. Shortly afterwards, the band supported Gwar on their tour of the US, which lasted until the end of November.

== Reception ==
Professional ratings
Review scores
Source	Rating
AbsolutePunk	91%
AllMusic	3.5/5 stars
Blare	4/5 stars
Chart Attack	4/5 stars
Hearwax	7.7/10
Punknews.org	3.5/5 stars
Rock Sound	9/10
Sputnikmusic	4/5 stars
Thrash Hits	5/6
Ultimate Guitar	9/10

The album has received mostly positive reviews. AbsolutePunk reviewer Drew Beringer gave an overall verdict of 91%, saying "The truth is Every Time I Die has never sounded better, and New Junk Aesthetic, musically speaking, should be classified as a weapon of mass destruction" as well as praising the album's guitar work." Another positive review came from Sputnikmusic staff reviewer Adam Thomas, commenting on how it is a fusion of all the band's previous albums, and "To put it simply, there's something for everyone." AllMusic gave the album three and a half stars and writes "Every Time I Die sounds energized and passionate, delivering its blend of old and new sounds with a directness that gives the ferocious music an unusually broad appeal."

The album debuted at number 46 on the US Billboard 200 chart, selling an estimated 12,000 copies in its first week.

== Track listing ==
All songs written and performed by Every Time I Die.

No.	Title	Length
1.	"Roman Holiday"	3:00
2.	"The Marvelous Slut"	1:43
3.	"Who Invited the Russian Soldier?"	2:45
4.	"Wanderlust"	4:10
5.	"For the Record"	2:59
6.	"White Smoke"	3:00
7.	"Turtles All the Way Down"	2:42
8.	"Organ Grinder"	4:07
9.	"Host Disorder"	2:29
10.	"After One Quarter of a Revolution"	2:04
11.	"The Sweet Life"	2:52

Deluxe edition bonus tracks

No.	Title	Length
12.	"Buffalo 666"	2:40
13.	"Goddam Kids These Days"	3:01

== Personnel ==
Personnel per booklet, except where noted.

Every Time I Die

- Keith Buckley – lead vocals
- Jordan Buckley – lead guitar
- Andy Williams – rhythm guitar
- Josh Newton – bass

Additional musicians

- Michael Novak – drums
- Greg Puciato – vocals on "The Marvelous Slut"
- Matt Caughthran – vocals on "The Sweet Life"
- Pete Wentz – vocals on "After One Quarter of a Revolution"

Production

- Steve Evetts – production, engineering, mixing
- Allan Hessler – additional engineering, editing
- Matthew Mesiano – digital assistance
- Alan Douches – mastering
- Jordan Buckley – art direction, illustrations
- Nick Pritchard – coloring, design
