= Hot Damn! (Every Time I Die album) =

Studio album by Every Time I Die
- Released: July 1, 2003
- Recorded: February–March 2003
- Studios: Trax East, South River, New Jersey
- Genres: Metalcore; hardcore punk
- Length: 27:09
- Label: Ferret
- Producer: Eric Rachel

Every Time I Die chronology
Last Night in Town (2001)	Hot Damn! (2003)	Gutter Phenomenon (2005)

Hot Damn! is the second studio album by American metalcore band Every Time I Die.

== Background ==
In mid-December 2002, it was announced that the band had booked time to record their next album in February 2003, with the aim of releasing it in June. Recording took place at Trax East studios in South River, New Jersey with producer Eric Rachel. On February 13, it was announced that drums had been tracked and that progress on guitars was underway. The album incorporates cowbell.

"Romeo a Go-Go" is the lead track of this album. It mentions literary figures such as Milton, Shakespeare, Donne, and Chaucer. According to frontman Keith Buckley:

At the time that we wrote the record, I was like finishing up at U.B., and I had to take like, a ton, a ton of literary courses because I was an English major and I had to take a ton of literary courses to get my degree in the amount of time I had. So, I was taking like, six literature courses. So I was taking like Milton and Shakespeare, and John Donne and Chaucer, like all at the same time. So that was pretty much pervasive in my life. Like, all that old literature. So, I mean, if there is somebody out there that would actually put the time into reading hardcore lyrics, which I doubt there is, then, you know, there is a lot of Shakespeare images in there, just because that was what I was reading at the time.

== Release ==
Following recording, the band went on tour with Unearth and Evergreen Terrace in March 2003. Before embarking on another tour, the band filmed a music video with director Darren Doane for "Ebolarama". In April, the band performed a few shows with the Dillinger Escape Plan. In April and May, the band went on tour with Hopesfall, the Beautiful Mistake, and Celebrity. In May and June, the band went on tour with Give Up the Ghost. Throughout parts of tour, the Hope Conspiracy, Suicide File, My Chemical Romance and Black Cross performed on select dates. On June 2, Hot Damn! was announced for release in the following month. Later in June, the band went on a UK tour with Nora. Hot Damn! was released on July 1 through Ferret Records. Following this, the band made an appearance at Hellfest. In late July and early August, the band went on tour with Throwdown, Terror, and Day of Contempt. Following this, the band went on tour with Comeback Kid for the remainder of August. In September and October, the band went on a US tour alongside From Autumn to Ashes, Cave In and Funeral for a Friend.

In early and mid-November, the band went on tour with Senses Fail. Following this, the band went on tour with Poison the Well in November and December. This Day Forward, ArmsBendBack, the Bronx, Nora and Codeseven appeared on select dates of the tour. The band performed a few US shows in late January 2004, before embarking on a European tour in February with Chimaira and Stampin' Ground. Prior to the tour, the group's manager put in a bid for them to play Ozzfest. Vocalist Keith Buckley said "No one had their hopes up or anything, so we just focused on the tour." While on the tour, the band received a call "saying it was looking real good, and by the time we got home it had already gone through. We were pretty blown away." On March 8, Hot Damn! was released in Europe by Roadrunner Records. It included two live recordings from Hellfest and a cover of the Guns N' Roses song "I Used to Love Her".

The band supported As I Lay Dying and the Black Dahlia Murder on their co-headlining tour of the US in March and April. The band performed a few shows in late April with Throwdown, Walls of Jericho and 36 Crazyfists, prior to headlining the New England Metal and Hardcore Festival. In May, the band went on tour of the US with Evergreen Terrace and the Kinison. On May 17, a music video for "I Been Gone a Long Time", directed by Greg Kaplan and Rafaela Monfradini, was posted online by Ferret Music. Between early July and early September, the band participated in the 2004 edition of Ozzfest, performing on the second stage. In between dates on the tour, the band performed a few shows with Lamb of God, Atreyu and Unearth. In addition, the band performed at the PigStock 10 festival in mid-August. From late September and early November, the band supported the Dillinger Escape Plan on their headlining US tour. In February 2005, the band supported Shadows Fall on their Extreme Dojo Vol. 12 tour in Japan, followed by a tour of Australia.

The album was reissued on vinyl as part of a box set along with Last Night in Town (2001) and Gutter Phenomenon (2005). The box set was released on December 12, 2006 through Suburban Home Records. Both Hot Damn! and Gutter Phenomenon were repressed in September 2008.

== Reception ==
Professional ratings
Review scores
Source	Rating
AllMusic	3/5 stars
CMJ New Music Report	Favorable
Lambgoat	7/10 stars
LAS Magazine	Favorable
Punknews.org	4/5 stars

Hot Damn! sold close to 4,000 copies two weeks after its release. Ferret Music founder Carl Severson spent two years promoting Last Night in Town. Within five weeks, Hot Damn! had outsold Last Night in Town. The music video for "Ebolorama" was nominated for Best Metal Video of the New Millennium by MTV.

== Track listing ==
No.	Title	Length
1.	"Romeo a Go-Go"	2:40
2.	"Off Broadway"	2:28
3.	"I Been Gone a Long Time"	3:02
4.	"Godspeed Us to Sea"	2:32
5.	"She's My Rushmore"	1:48
6.	"Floater"	2:55
7.	"In the Event That Everything Should Go Terribly Wrong"	2:38
8.	"Ebolarama"	2:58
9.	"Hit of the Search Party"	3:11
10.	"Pornogratherapy"	2:50

== Personnel ==
- Keith Buckley – vocals
- Jordan Buckley – lead guitar
- Andrew Williams – rhythm guitar
- Stephen Micciche – bass
- Michael "Ratboy" Novak Jr. – drums

== Chart positions ==
Album - Billboard (North America)

Year	Chart	Position
2003	Top Independent Albums	49
