= Radical (Every Time I Die album) =

Studio album by Every Time I Die
- Released: October 22, 2021
- Recorded: 2019–2020
- Studios: GCR, Buffalo, New York
- Genres: Metalcore; post-hardcore; stoner rock; noise rock
- Length: 51:24
- Label: Epitaph
- Producer: Will Putney

Every Time I Die chronology
Low Teens (2016)	Radical (2021)

Singles from Radical
- 1. "A Colossal Wreck" Released: December 8, 2020; 2. "Desperate Pleasures" Released: December 8, 2020; 3. "AWOL" Released: February 1, 2021; 4. "Post-Boredom" Released: August 17, 2021; 5. "Planet Shit" Released: September 13, 2021; 6. "Thing with Feathers" Released: October 22, 2021

Professional ratings
Aggregate scores
Source	Rating
Metacritic	84/100
Review scores
Source	Rating
AllMusic	4/5 stars
Classic Rock	7/10
Exclaim!	8/10
Kerrang!	4/5
Metal Hammer	4/5 stars
The Music	5/5 stars
Rock Hard	8.5/10
Sputnikmusic	4.2/5

Radical is the ninth and final studio album by American metalcore band Every Time I Die. It was released on October 22, 2021, and was the band's first studio album in 5 years, since 2016's Low Teens, as well as their only release to feature drummer Clayton "Goose" Holyoak. Radical was named album of the year in 2021 by Kerrang!

== Background and release ==
On September 9, 2019, the band confirmed that they had started work on their ninth album. They later announced during the January 2020 UK/EU tour supporting While She Sleeps, that the recording process of the album would start once they returned to the US. The band completed recording before the COVID-19 pandemic escalated in the United States in early 2020, leading them to hold off on releasing the album until they were able to tour in support of it. Vocalist Keith Buckley explained in a recent interview, "I dared myself to make some drastic changes in my life. During the pandemic, everything just came to a head. The thing is, we were already done writing and recording the record. The pandemic didn’t actually influence the record at all, but it did influence the way that the record lives. Songs like “Post-Boredom” came to have a new meaning after the pandemic. Songs like “Dark Distance” look a little strange now in hindsight, considering it was written before the pandemic, asking for a plague to happen."

On December 8, 2020, the band released two new songs called "A Colossal Wreck" and "Desperate Pleasures" in the lead-up to their live stream event which took place on December 19, 2020 instead of their annual Tid the Season show. A third track, "AWOL" was released on February 1, 2021.

On August 17, 2021, the band released the song "Post-Boredom" as a single for their album Radical, which they also announced that day. The band also did a pop-up show in Buffalo on August 26, as well as a show for the Ghost Inside's east coast return show on August 28, where they debuted "Post-Boredom".

Two more singles were released in advance, closer to the album's release date; "Planet Shit" on September 13, 2021 and "Thing with Feathers", via music video on the album's release date, October 22, 2021. The latter song features Andy Hull of Manchester Orchestra, and it was written in memory of the Buckley brothers' sister Jaclyn, who lived with Rett syndrome and died from it in early 2017. Since then, Keith has encouraged disabled attendees of the band's shows to tag him personally.

As with Low Teens, the album was again produced by Will Putney, guitarist of Fit for an Autopsy, known for his production work with the Acacia Strain, Body Count, and The Amity Affliction.

== Touring cancellation and band's split ==
In support of the album, the band was set to tour the UK from January 27 to February 5, 2022, with other bands such as Sanction, Jesus Piece, and the Bronx. However, on December 4, 2021, vocalist Keith Buckley announced that he is taking a hiatus from the band for his mental health. Due to Keith's departure and their UK tour being cancelled by COVID restrictions, the band eventually broke up in January 2022.

== Accolades ==
=== Year-end lists ===
Publication	Country	Accolade	Rank	Ref.
Consequence	US	Top 30 Metal and Hard Rock Albums of 2021	16	
Invisible Oranges	US	20 Best Metalcore Albums of 2021	1	
Kerrang!	UK	The 50 best albums of 2021	1	
Loudwire	US	The 45 Best Rock + Metal Albums of 2021	2	
Revolver	US	25 Best Albums of 2021	4	
Loudwire	US	The 35 Best Metal Songs of 2021 ("Planet Shit")	10	

== Track listing ==
All tracks are written by Every Time I Die.

No.	Title	Length
1.	"Dark Distance"	2:55
2.	"Sly"	2:31
3.	"Planet Shit"	3:56
4.	"Post-Boredom"	3:22
5.	"A Colossal Wreck"	2:32
6.	"Desperate Pleasures"	3:11
7.	"All This and War" (featuring Josh Scogin of '68)	3:10
8.	"Thing with Feathers" (featuring Andy Hull of Manchester Orchestra)	3:43
9.	"Hostile Architecture"	2:36
10.	"AWOL"	2:10
11.	"The Whip"	2:30
12.	"White Void"	3:34
13.	"Distress Rehearsal"	3:13
14.	"sexsexsex"	3:27
15.	"People Verses"	3:32
16.	"We Go Together"	5:02
Total length:		51:24

== Personnel ==
Every Time I Die

- Keith Buckley – vocals
- Jordan Buckley – lead guitar
- Andrew Williams – rhythm guitar
- Stephen Micciche – bass
- Clayton “Goose” Holyoak – drums

Guest musicians

- Josh Scogin - vocals on "All This and War"
- Andy Hull – vocals on "Thing with Feathers"

Production

- Will Putney – production, engineering, mixing, mastering
- Steve Seid – additional engineering
- Jay Zubricky – additional engineering
- Geo Hewitt – additional editing

Visual art

- Corey Meyers – art, design

Studios

- GCR Audio, Buffalo, NY – recording
- Graphic Nature Audio in Belleville, NJ – mixing, mastering

== Charts ==
Chart performance for Radical
Chart (2021)	Peak position
Australian Albums (ARIA)	23
German Albums (Offizielle Top 100)	87
UK Albums (Official Charts)	73
UK Rock & Metal Albums (Official Charts)	4
US Billboard 200	45
US Independent Albums (Billboard)	6
US Top Hard Rock Albums (Billboard)	2
US Top Rock Albums (Billboard)	7
