= Josh Newton (musician) =

American musician (born 1973)

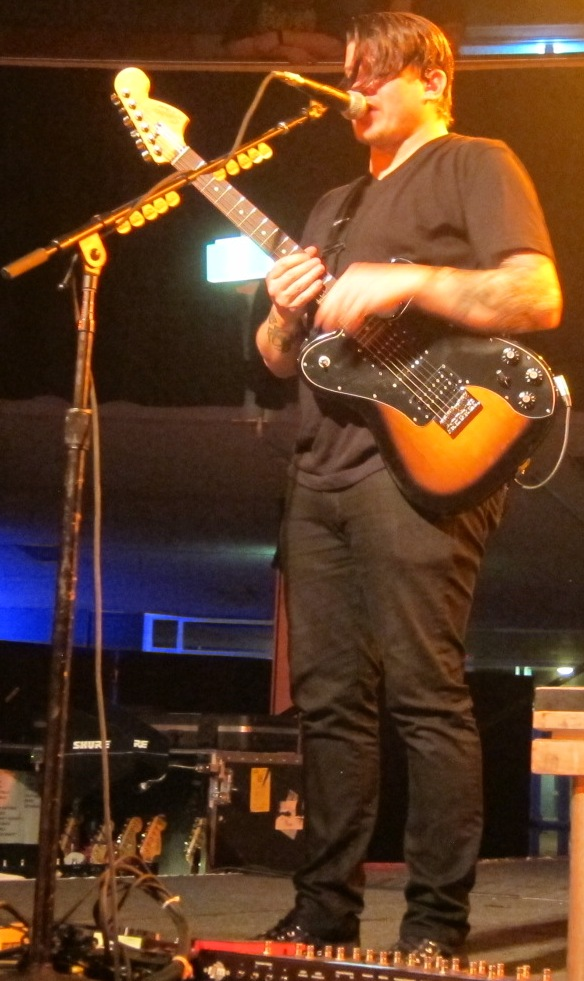
- Newton soundchecking for Fall Out Boy on February 24, 2015

Background information
- Born: Joshua Newton; June 8, 1973 (age 53)
- Origin: New Bedford, Massachusetts, U.S.
- Genres: Post-hardcore; metalcore; emo; alternative rock; hard rock
- Occupation: Musician
- Instruments: Bass; vocals; guitar
- Years active: 1991–present
- Labels: Red Decibel; Vagrant; Epitaph

Josh Newton (born June 8, 1973) is an American musician, perhaps best known for his tenure as the bassist in Every Time I Die. He is also the singer and guitarist of The Great Fire of Sixteen Sixty Six. Newton was a member of the following rock bands: Shiner, From Autumn To Ashes, Biology, Glazed Baby, Season to Risk, Iron Rite Mangle, Creamy, Shots Fired, The Damned Things, and Reggie and the Full Effect. Newton also did a tour playing rhythm guitar for Unsane in 1994 with Today Is The Day.

In August 2004, Newton was recruited to play bass for From Autumn To Ashes after original bassist Mike Pilato left. He met the band when they opened for Reggie and the Full Effect on the Vagrant America tour. Upon leaving FATA in August 2007, he was immediately invited to play bass with Every Time I Die for a tour with Underoath. He was recently announced via Twitter as the bassist for The Damned Things with members of Fall Out Boy and Anthrax.

In 2011, Newton filled in on several shows for Danish rockers Volbeat when their bassist had to return to Denmark suddenly.

On October 12, 2011, it was announced that Newton and Every Time I Die had amicably parted ways, following the end of their international tour with The Acacia Strain.

One of Newton's latest musical endeavors is With Knives, a duo with The Damned Things bandmate Joe Trohman. The band released an EP and toured in the US. He's also been teasing material for a new project, Sie Lieben Maschinen.

Newton is currently the guitar technician for Joe Trohman of Fall Out Boy. He filled in for Trohman on guitar with Fall Out Boy for several shows in the UK in January 2015 when Trohman's mother became ill and then after Trohman had back surgery.

In 2017, Newton started working for Kings of Leon as a guitar tech.. Josh is currently the bass tech for Pete Wentz of Fall Out Boy
