= Low Teens =

Studio album by Every Time I Die
- Released: September 23, 2016
- Studio: GCR Audio, Buffalo, New York
- Genre: Metalcore; Southern rock; hardcore punk
- Length: 43:21
- Label: Epitaph
- Producer: Will Putney

Every Time I Die chronology
From Parts Unknown (2014)	Low Teens (2016)	Radical (2021)

Professional ratings
Aggregate scores
Source	Rating
Metacritic	84/100
Review scores
Source	Rating
AllMusic	3.5/5 stars
Alternative Press	favorable
Blabbermouth.net	7.5/10
Exclaim!	8/10
Punknews.org	4/5 stars
Rock Sound	8/10

Low Teens is the eighth studio album by American metalcore band Every Time I Die. It is the band's only release to feature drummer Daniel Davison.

== Release ==
On June 22, 2016, Low Teens was announced for release in September. In addition, "The Coin Has a Say" was made available for streaming. Low Teens was released on September 23 through independent label Epitaph Records. In September and October, the band went on a headlining tour of Canada with support from Knocked Loose and Hollow Earth. In January 2017, the band went on a tour of Australia with Letlive and Counterparts. In May, the band made appearances at the Carolina Rebellion, Northern Invasion and Rock on the Range festivals. In early June, the band performed at Download Festival in the UK, followed by a performance at UNIFY festival in Australia. In July and August, the band went on a co-headlining US tour with Taking Back Sunday. They were supported for the first half by Modern Chemistry and for the second half by All Get Out.

== Track listing ==
All tracks are written by Every Time I Die.

No.	Title	Length
1.	"Fear and Trembling" (feat. Tim Singer of Deadguy)	2:55
2.	"Glitches"	2:46
3.	"C++ (Love Will Get You Killed)"	2:47
4.	"Two Summers"	3:22
5.	"Awful Lot"	3:32
6.	"I Didn't Want to Join Your Stupid Cult Anyway"	2:24
7.	"It Remembers" (feat. Brendon Urie of Panic! at the Disco)	3:43
8.	"Petal"	2:59
9.	"The Coin Has a Say"	2:47
10.	"Religion of Speed"	5:10
11.	"Just as Real but Not as Brightly Lit"	3:08
12.	"1977"	2:37
13.	"Map Change"	4:57
Total length:		43:21

Deluxe edition bonus tracks
No.	Title	Length
14.	"Skin Without Bones"	2:32
15.	"Nothing Visible; Ocean Empty"	3:49
Total length:		49:28

== Credits ==
Writing, performance and production credits are adapted from the album liner notes.

=== Personnel ===
==== Every Time I Die ====
- Keith Buckley – vocals
- Jordan Buckley – guitar
- Andrew Williams – guitar
- Stephen Micciche – bass
- Daniel Davison – drums

==== Guest musicians ====
- Brendon Urie – vocals on "It Remembers"
- Tim Singer (Deadguy) – vocals on "Fear and Trembling"

==== Additional musicians ====
- Randy LeBoeuf – piano on "Awful Lot"

==== Production ====
- Will Putney – production, engineering, mixing
- Steve Seid – additional engineering
- Randy LeBeouf – additional engineering
- Jay Zubricky – engineering assistant
- Alan Douches – mastering

==== Visual art ====
- Joby J. Ford – art, design

=== Studios ===
- GCR Audio, Buffalo, NY – recording
- West West Side Music, New Windsor, NY – mastering

== Charts ==
Chart	Peak position
Australian Albums (ARIA)	25
Canadian Albums (Billboard)	57
German Albums (Offizielle Top 100)	80
Scottish Albums (OCC)	74
UK Albums (OCC)	89
US Billboard 200	23
US Independent Albums (Billboard)	2
US Vinyl Albums (Billboard)	1
