= From Parts Unknown =

Studio album by Every Time I Die
- Released: July 1, 2014
- Recorded: March 2014
- Studios: GodCity, Salem, Massachusetts
- Genres: Metalcore; Southern rock
- Length: 32:05
- Label: Epitaph
- Producer: Kurt Ballou

Every Time I Die chronology
Ex Lives (2012)	From Parts Unknown (2014)	Low Teens (2016)

From Parts Unknown is the seventh studio album by American metalcore band Every Time I Die.

== Recording and composition ==
From Parts Unknown was recorded over the course of a month with Kurt Ballou of Converge at GodCity Studio in Salem, Massachusetts in March 2014. Vocalist Keith Buckley said Ballou "always intimidated the living shit out of me, so I was overjoyed when the decision was made to record our next record with him". The band were massive fans of Converge, with guitarist Jordan Buckley stating that the band would not exist if not for Converge. He said they "went into recording thinking, 'Let's not pretend to be too cool. We can learn so much from him'". Keith said that working with Ballou was "stressful in the best way, like when your dad comes to watch you play baseball for the first time and you just want to make him proud". Ballou challenged the band to push themselves to make heavy but catchy songs. Buckley had contracted laryngitis, which had caused him to track the majority of his vocals in one day.

According to Buckley, "Instead of making something that the kids can all sing along to," the group wanted to create "music that scares them". According to Blabbermouth.net, the album title was "initially inspired by a term used by wrestlers to increase their mystique, It ultimately references the more hopeful mood that creeped into the album's lyrics during songwriting." Buckley said he didn't "realize I had that more positive outlook in me".

== Release ==
On May 19, 2014, From Parts Unknown was announced for release, and its track listing and artwork was revealed. In addition, a music video was released for "Thirst". According to themusic, the video features "two dudes running roughshod through and at the outskirts of a city on their way to a house party". From Parts Unknown was made available for streaming on June 16, before being released on July 1 through Epitaph Records. In January 2015, the band went on a tour of Australia with Touché Amoré. In April and May, the group supported The Used on their headlining US tour. In November and December, the band supported August Burns Red on their headlining US tour.

== Reception ==
Professional ratings
Aggregate scores
Source	Rating
Metacritic	92/100
Review scores
Source	Rating
AbsolutePunk	98%
AllMusic	4/5 stars
Alternative Press	4/5 stars
Blunt Magazine	4.5/5
Exclaim!	9/10
FasterLouder	Favourable
Hit the Floor	5/5 stars
Punknews.org	4.5/5 stars
Sputnikmusic	4.1/5

Upon its release, From Parts Unknown was met with critical acclaim from music critics. According to Metacritic, where they assign a weighted average score out of 100 to ratings and reviews from mainstream critics, the album received an average of 92, based on 6 reviews, indicating "universal acclaim". Drew Beringer of AbsolutePunk called the record "desperate, ferocious, and raw." James Monger of AllMusic wrote "Every Time I Die have established themselves as one of the more reliable and relatable ... acts to come out of the genre, not to mention one of the most discernable, and the commanding From Parts Unknown does nothing to tarnish that reputation." Jason Pettigrew of Alternative Press wrote, "This band may be close to two decades and seven albums in, but in these here Parts, Every Time I Die are coming out of the box like airborne wolverines lunging for the world's carotid arteries." Jacob Royal of Sputnikmusic claimed "it's commendable enough for the band to switch gears once having gotten to cruise control, and this record makes it clear that change was the main thing they sought." The album was included at number 14 on Rock Sound's "Top 50 Albums of the Year" list. The album was included at number 27 on Kerrang!'s "The Top 50 Rock Albums Of 2014" list.

The album charted at number 22 on the Billboard 200 chart, selling around 12,000 copies in its first week.

== Track listing ==
No.	Title	Length
1.	"The Great Secret"	2:39
2.	"Pelican of the Desert" (featuring Sean Ingram of Coalesce)	2:03
3.	"Decayin' with the Boys"	2:33
4.	"Overstayer"	2:09
5.	"If There Is Room to Move, Things Move"	2:39
6.	"Moor"	3:27
7.	"Exometrium"	2:42
8.	"Thirst"	1:26
9.	"Old Light" (featuring Brian Fallon of the Gaslight Anthem)	3:10
10.	"All Structures Are Unstable"	2:04
11.	"El Dorado"	4:18
12.	"Idiot"	2:55
Total length:		32:05

Deluxe edition bonus tracks
No.	Title	Length
13.	"Cheap Ludes"	2:20
14.	"Saturnalia"	2:33
Total length:		36:34

== Personnel ==
Every Time I Die

- Keith Buckley – vocals
- Jordan Buckley – guitar
- Andrew Williams – guitar
- Ryan Leger – drums
- Stephen Micciche – bass

Production

- Kurt Ballou – producer, recording, mixing
- Jay Zubricky – pre-production
- Alan Douches – mastering
- Alex Garcia-Rivera – drum tech
- Joby J. Ford – artwork

== Charts ==
Chart	Peak position
Australian Albums (ARIA)	32
UK Independent Albums (Official Charts)	22
UK Rock & Metal Albums (Official Charts)	16
US Billboard 200	22
US Digital Albums (Billboard)	23
US Independent Albums (Billboard)	3
US Top Hard Rock Albums (Billboard)	3
US Top Rock Albums (Billboard)	5
US Indie Store Album Sales (Billboard)	8
