= The Big Dirty (album) =

Studio album by Every Time I Die
- Released: September 4, 2007
- Recorded: March and April 2007
- Genres: Metalcore; Southern rock
- Length: 36:20
- Label: Ferret
- Producer: Steve Evetts

Every Time I Die chronology
Gutter Phenomenon (2005)	The Big Dirty (2007)	New Junk Aesthetic (2009)

The Big Dirty is the fourth studio album by American metalcore band Every Time I Die. It was released on September 4, 2007, on Ferret Records.

== Background ==
At the end of their set at Dirtfest on August 19, 2006, Every Time I Die announced that bassist Chris Byrnes would be leaving the band. Buckley said Byrnes departure was due to money, "He really couldn't afford it on our touring schedule and salary". He was replaced by former the Chariot member Keller Harbin. Following an October and November tour with Atreyu, the band started writing their next album, with aim of releasing it the following summer. On February 14, 2007, vocalist Keith Buckley mentioned that the band have been holed up in a basement in North Tonawanda, New York composing "what will easily prove to be the best record ETID has crafted since Gutter Phenomenon."

== Recording and composition ==
In early March 2007, the band went to California to record The Big Dirty with producer Steve Evetts for a period of two months. Despite the band announcing that, in regards to a bass player, fans should "expect some help on the recording from a good friend of ours", guitarists Jordan Buckley and Andy Williams perform bass on the album.

The title is a reference to the 2006 film Trailer Park Boys: The Movie, in which the criminal protagonists plot to pull off "The Big Dirty," a grand heist, before retiring from their lives of crime. The band said the album was "Chock-a-block with riffs that only 4 months of a Buffalo, New York winter could spawn, this new record will undoubtedly satisfy [long-time fans.] ... The Big Dirty is the CD you would compile if asked to make a mix of the BEST Every Time I Die songs you haven't heard yet. ... If this ain't your favorite heavy release of the year, I'll eat my damn hat." According to Buckley, the album's lyrical content revolve around "coming to terms with the fact that [prior to the album] I needed to calm down in life." He mentioned that people around him were starting to settle down and have families and he "didn’t like that. It’s about coming to terms with the fact I didn’t need to stop living.” According to a press release, the lyrics to "Imitation Is the Sincerest Form of Battery" were based on the Federico Fellini film 8½ (1963). The press release also mentioned that the track "has everything that the band has become notorious for wrapped into one two-minute-and-thirty-second keg stand of ass-kicking fuck-all."

== Release ==
On April 24, 2007, The Big Dirty was announced for release. In June, the band went on a tour of Australia with Norma Jean. During the tour, the band headlined the Come Together Music Festival. The band supported Shadows Fall for three shows, before headlining the 2007 edition of the Sounds of the Underground tour in July and August. On July 2, "Imitation Is the Sincerest Form of Battery" was made available for streaming. On July 8, the album's track listing and artwork was revealed. On July 24, "No Son of Mine" was made available for streaming. "We'rewolf" was released as a single on August 11, 2007. On August 28, a music video was posted for "We'rewolf" on the band's Myspace profile; it is inspired by the film Teen Wolf (1985). The Big Dirty was planned for release in August, however it was made available for streaming on August 31, and released on September 4 through Ferret Music. Between September and November 2007, the band supported Underoath on their headlining US tour. On October 19, the band appeared on Fuel TV's The Daily Habit show performing "We'rewolf" and "No Son of Mine". The band performed these two songs again for their appearance on Jimmy Kimmel Live! on October 31. In January and February 2008, the band went on a US tour alongside Killswitch Engage, the Dillinger Escape Plan and Parkway Drive. However, shortly prior to the tour, drummer Michael Novak had sustained a back injury from playing basketball. As a result, Steve Bache of He Is Legend temporarily filled in.

In February and March, the band co-headlined the Take Action Tour with From First to Last. The band then embarked on a European and UK tour in April with Drop Dead, Gorgeous and Scary Kids Scaring Kids. On June 13, the band announced that Josh Newton of From Autumn to Ashes had joined them as their new bassist. Between June and August 2008, the band performed on the Warped Tour. In October, the band made an appearance at Liskfest. Following this, the band performed a few shows with Trash Talk and Alpha & Omega. In November, the band went on the November Reign Tour in North America, alongside the Bronx and Stick to Your Guns. In February and March 2009, the band toured Australia as part of the Soundwave festival. In between dates on the festival, the band played two sideshows with the Dillinger Escape Plan, Poison the Well and Evergreen Terrace.

== Reception ==
Professional ratings
Review scores
Source	Rating
AllMusic	3.5/5 stars
AbsolutePunk	88%
Blabbermouth.net	8.5/10
Drowned in Sound	9/10
FasterLouder	Favourable
Kerrang!	5/5 stars
Spin	Favorable
Sputnikmusic	3/5

The album debuted at number 41 on the U.S. Billboard 200 chart, selling about 14,000 copies in its first week. The album was included in Rock Sound's 101 Modern Classics list at number 88.

== Track listing ==
No.	Title	Length
1.	"No Son of Mine"	3:25
2.	"Pigs Is Pigs"	2:39
3.	"Leatherneck"	2:08
4.	"We'rewolf"	3:24
5.	"Rebel Without Applause"	3:22
6.	"Cities and Years"	2:57
7.	"Rendez-Voodoo"	3:15
8.	"A Gentleman's Sport"	2:34
9.	"INRIhab" (featuring Dallas Green of Alexisonfire)	4:04
10.	"Depressionista"	2:29
11.	"Buffalo Gals"	3:27
12.	"Imitation Is the Sincerest Form of Battery"	2:29

== Personnel ==
Every Time I Die

- Keith Buckley – vocals
- Jordan Buckley – lead guitar, bass
- Andy Williams – rhythm guitar, bass
- Mike "Ratboy" Novak – drums

Others

- Dallas Green – guest vocals on "INRIhab".
- Steve Evetts – production, mixing, engineering
