= Every Time I Die =

American metalcore band (1998–2022)

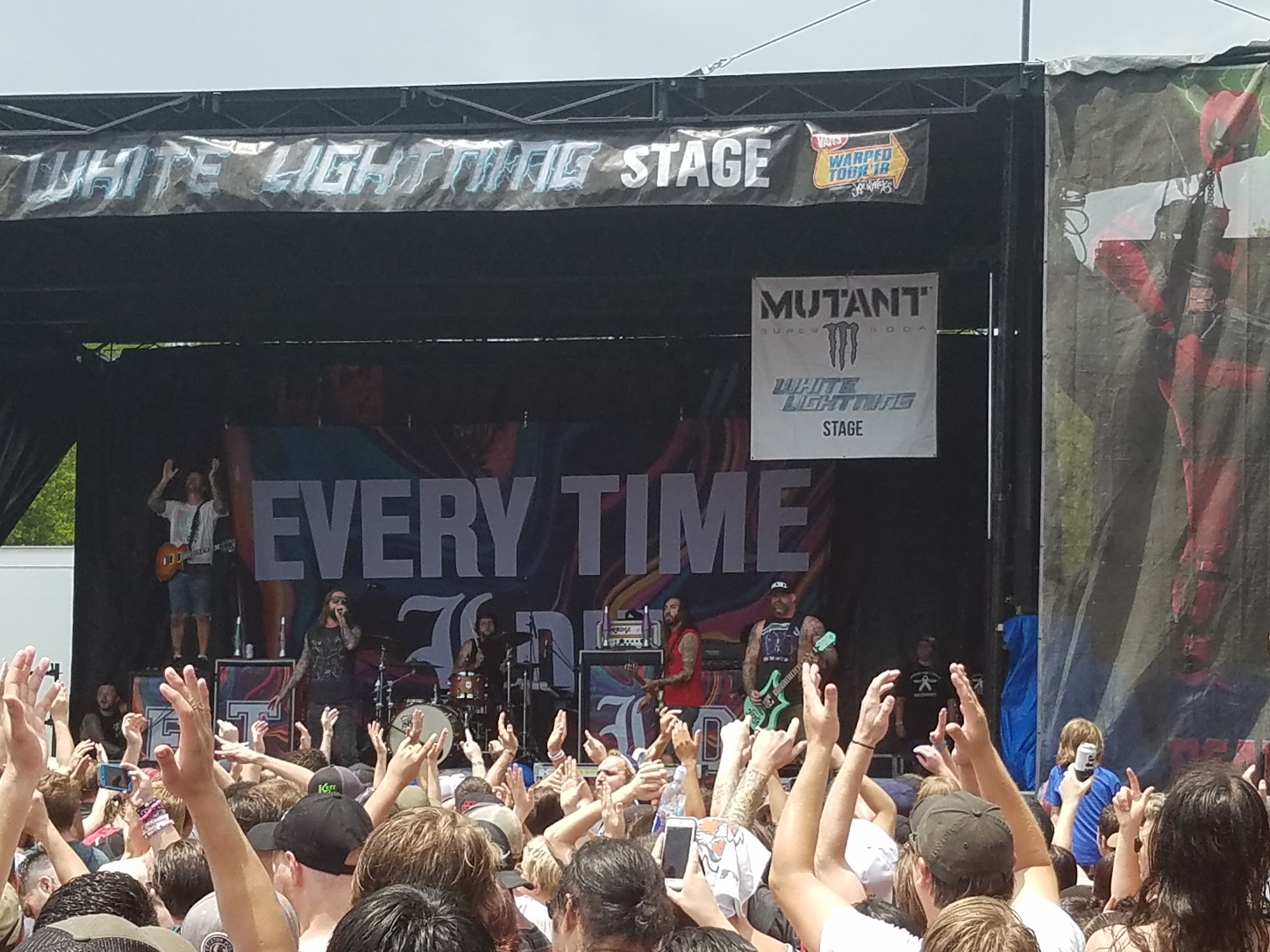
- Every Time I Die performing at the 2018 Vans Warped Tour

Background information
- Origin: Buffalo, New York, U.S.
- Genres: Metalcore; hardcore punk; mathcore; post-hardcore; southern metal
- Years active: 1998–2022
- Labels: Goodfellow; Ferret; Epitaph; Undecided
- Spinoffs: The Damned Things; Better Lovers; Many Eyes
- Past members: Keith Buckley; Jordan Buckley; Andy Williams; Stephen Micciche; Clayton Holyoak; John McCarthy; Michael Novak; Aaron Ratajczak; Kevin Falk; Chris Byrnes; Josh Newton; Ryan "Legs" Leger; Daniel Davison

Every Time I Die was an American metalcore band from Buffalo, New York, formed in 1998. For most of the band's career, the line-up was centred on brothers Keith (vocals) and Jordan Buckley (guitar), as well as rhythm guitarist Andy Williams, with bassist Stephen Micciche also being in the band for a cumulative 15 of the band's 24 years. After spending the first decade of their career on the Ferret Music label, they signed with Epitaph Records in 2008 and remained there until their split in early 2022. Every Time I Die released nine studio albums, with their final album Radical being released in October 2021.

The band garnered acclaim for their energetic and intense live shows, as well as their constantly evolving sound, with Kerrang! noting that the band "shaped the cutting edge of modern metalcore."

== History ==
=== Early years, The Burial Plot Bidding War and Last Night in Town (1998–2000) ===
Every Time I Die was founded in 1998 by Jordan Buckley, Andy Williams and Michael Novak. The unit recruited vocalist Keith Buckley and bassist John McCarthy. The group's first performance was a Canadian date, held in Hamilton, Ontario.

In their first short tour covering the Buffalo, New York, and Toronto, Ontario, Canada vicinity, the band met Goodfellow Records producer Chris Logan, who released the band's debut EP The Burial Plot Bidding War in December 1999. The band also contributed an exclusive song to Redstar Records' Various Artists compilation The Sound and the Fury, released in October 1999.

The following year, Aaron Ratajczak replaced McCarthy as bassist and the band entered Zing Studios in Westfield, Massachusetts, to begin recording their debut full length for Ferret Records in January 2001.

The band released Last Night In Town on August 14, 2001, and embarked on an east coast tour with Killswitch Engage in support. That same year Stephen Micciche, of Kid Gorgeous replaced Ratajczak as bassist.

=== Hot Damn! and Gutter Phenomenon (2001–2006) ===
In mid-December 2002, it was announced that the band had booked time to record their next album in February 2003, with the aim of releasing it in June. Recording took place at Trax East studios in South River, New Jersey, with producer Eric Rachel. On February 13, 2003, it was announced that drums had been tracked and that progress on guitars was underway. The following March, the band embarked on tour with Unearth and Evergreen Terrace and shot a music video for the album's lead single, "Ebolorama" with director Darren Doane. The band released Hot Damn! on July 1, 2003, and embarked on an American tour supporting Jackass star Steve-O. The album was well received and brought about their first mini Warped Tour stint, overseas tours with NORA and Chimaira, numerous U.S. tours with bands such as Bleeding Through, Norma Jean, Dillinger Escape Plan and a spot on the 2004 Ozzfest tour.

In 2004, Undecided Records reissued the band debut EP The Burial Plot Bidding War with an upgraded artwork and remastered audio.

Micciche resigned from his position in 2005 toward the end of the writing sessions for Gutter Phenomenon, with the band announcing they were accepting online submissions to replace Micciche. Kevin Falk of Between The Buried and Me filled the vacant position in April 2005. The band released Gutter Phenomenon on August 23, 2005, on Ferret Records with Falk being let go from the band almost immediately after the album's release for personal reasons. He was replaced by Chris Byrnes of NORA who left the band immediately following their stint on Warped Tour 2006 under amicable circumstances. He was replaced by Keller Harbin of The Chariot and embarked on tour with Atreyu on the World Championship Tour along with From First to Last and Chiodos.

On October 30, 2006, the band released their first DVD entitled "Shit Happens" including various home videos, tour antics and live footage of the band.

=== The Big Dirty and New Junk Aesthetic (2007–2011) ===
In February 2007, Keith Buckley stated that the band had been holed up in a basement in North Tonawanda, New York writing their fourth album. On April 24, 2007, the band announced that The Big Dirty would be released on September 4 of that year. The band embarked on tour with Norma Jean of June 2007. The next month the band released the first single, "Imitation Is the Sincerest Form of Battery" on all streaming services. Upon release of the album, Josh Newton replaced Harbin on bass and the band embarked on tour with Underoath, Poison The Well and Maylene and The Sons Of Disaster. The band performed the song "We'rewolf" live on the ABC late night talk show Jimmy Kimmel Live! on Halloween of 2007.

From January-February 2008, Every Time I Die went on a tour with Killswitch Engage, The Dillinger Escape Plan, and Parkway Drive. They also headlined the Take Action Tour, playing alongside From First to Last, August Burns Red, The Bled, and The Human Abstract. The band played the entire Warped Tour 2008. In July 2008, Keith Buckley announced that the band had fulfilled their contract with Ferret Records and were looking for a new label. In February 2009 the band announced that they have signed with Epitaph Records and would be going into the studio later that year to begin production on their fifth album.

During the 2009 UK tour with Gallows, a song titled "Buffalo 666" was played for the first time. At the end of June it was announced that drummer Mike "Ratboy" Novak had left the band due to "personal conflicts". On August 23 of that year, Ryan "Legs" Leger was added as the new drummer. The band released New Junk Aesthetic on September 15, 2009. The band was part of the European Taste of Chaos tour at the end of 2009, supporting headliners Killswitch Engage and In Flames.

Every Time I Die headlined the 2010 Australian Boys of Summer Tour. In support of Every Time I Die were Australian bands 50 Lions, House vs. Hurricane and Mary Jane Kelly. The band toured across Australia playing shows in Sydney, Gold Coast, Brisbane, Melbourne, Adelaide and Perth.

Josh Newton announced on October 12, 2011, that he was no longer in the band. For the remainder of the tour, Stephen Micciche filled his role as bassist. On December 12, they released a video on Warped Tour's YouTube channel announcing they were playing all dates on the 2012 Warped Tour.

=== Ex Lives and From Parts Unknown (2012–2015) ===
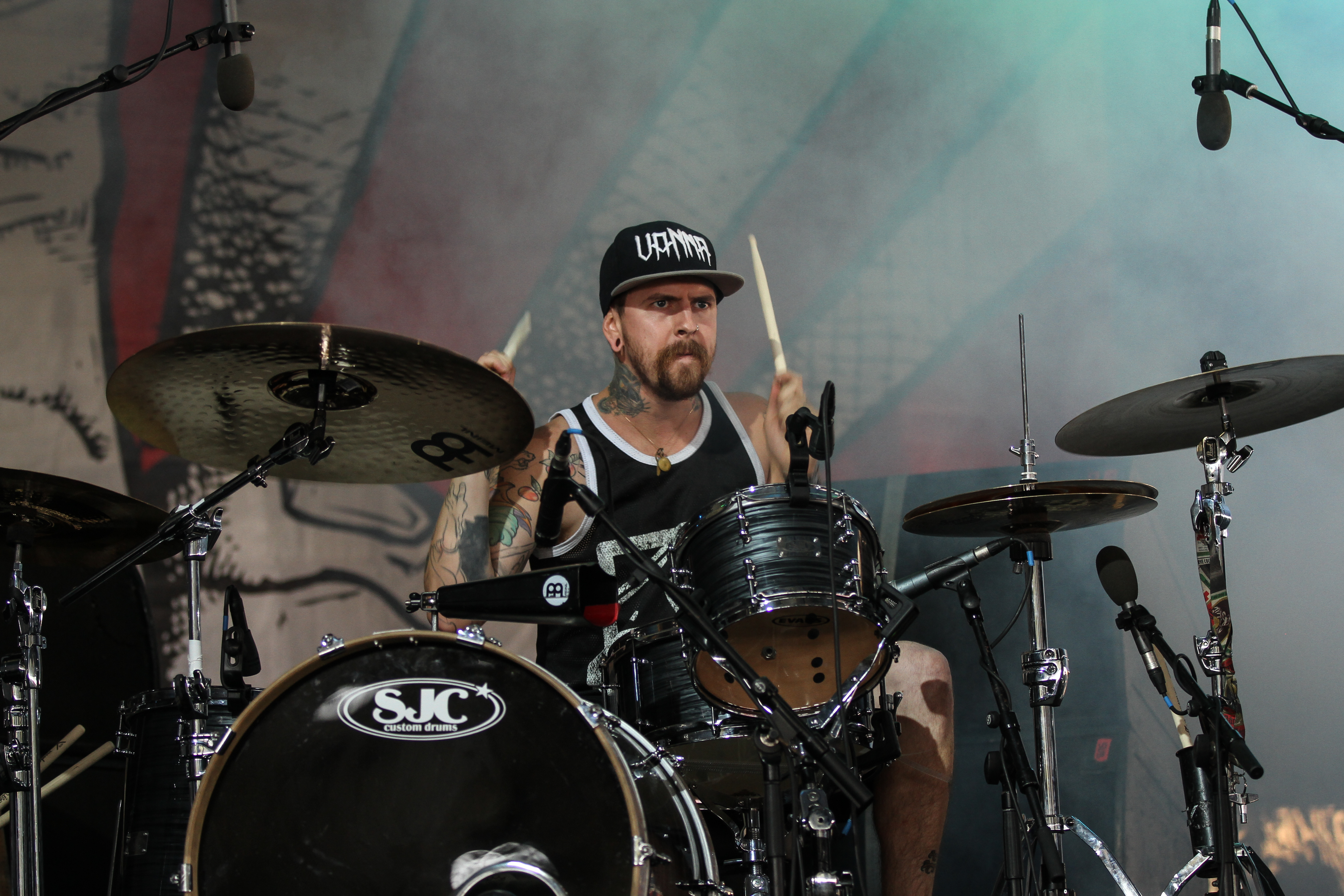
Ryan Leger (pictured in 2013) was the band's drummer from 2009 to 2015. He was succeeded by Daniel Davison, formerly of Norma Jean, and in 2017 joined Norma Jean himself - replacing Clayton Holyoak, who went on to join ETID as its final drummer.

In January 2012, Every Time I Die released their video for "Underwater Bimbos from Outer Space", from their album Ex Lives, which was released on March 6, 2012. On February 23, the band released the second single and music video off the album for "Revival Mode". The band embarked on tour with The Devil Wears Prada, Oh, Sleeper and Letlive in 2012 in support of Ex Lives.

On October 15, 2013, the band was announced to be a support act for A Day to Remember on their European Tour 2014.

In the spring of 2014, the band announced that they were starting production on their seventh studio album From Parts Unknown with producer Kurt Ballou, which was released July 1, 2014, along with their sixth run on the Vans Warped Tour 20th edition. The album peaked at No. 22 on the Billboard 200, the second top-30 placement in the band's discography. Following their time on Warped Tour, Every Time I Die started a Canadian tour in mid-September with Expire and Counterparts. Following their Canadian tour, they co-headlined a winter tour with The Ghost Inside along with support from Architects, Backtrack and Hundredth as their openers.

In February 2015, the band announced Ryan Leger's departure, and he was replaced by Daniel Davison, formerly of Norma Jean and Underoath. On March 29, the band revealed that they would be releasing an EP exclusively for Record Store Day titled Salem.

=== Low Teens and Radical (2015–2021) ===
In December 2015 while on tour with August Burns Red, Keith Buckley left due to a life-threatening emergency with his 7-month pregnant wife and unborn daughter. It was during this time and the subsequent hospital stays that Buckley wrote a vast majority of lyrics for a new album while awaiting their clean bill of health and recovery.

On September 23, 2016, the band released Low Teens to universal critical acclaim. The band spent the next 2 years touring with the likes of Knocked Loose, Harm's Way, Fall Out Boy, Taking Back Sunday, '68, Motionless In White, Turnstile and Machine Gun Kelly in support of the album.

In September 2017, Daniel Davison parted ways with the band, citing exhaustion from touring. He was replaced by Clayton "Goose" Holyoak of Fear Before The March Of Flames - who had, coincidentally, also previously replaced Davison in Norma Jean. Holyoak was subsequently replaced in Norma Jean by another former Every Time I Die drummer, Ryan Leger.

On June 21, 2018, the band embarked on the final run of the Vans Warped Tour. In October 2018, the band announced that they would embark on one last tour in support of Low Teens with Turnstile, Angel Du$t and Vein.fm before taking time off to begin writing their ninth record. On December 15, 2018, the band was honored by their native Buffalo, for their musical accomplishments and advocacy for the city, with an annual holiday on December 15 named after the band. The band revealed in an interview they all had to share their ETID Day plaque between them.

On September 9, 2019, the band confirmed that they had started work on their ninth album.

They later announced during the January 2020 UK/EU tour supporting While She Sleeps, that the recording process of the album would start once they returned to the US. The band completed recording before the COVID-19 pandemic escalated in the United States in early 2020, and waited to release the new album until they were able to tour in support of it. On December 8, 2020, the band released two new songs called "A Colossal Wreck" and "Desperate Pleasures" in the lead-up to their live stream event which took place on December 19, 2020, instead of their annual Tid the Season show. A third track, "AWOL" was released via email to those who purchased tickets to the TIDathon and released to streaming platforms on February 1, 2021.

On August 17, 2021, the band released the song "Post-Boredom" as a single for their album Radical, which they also announced that day. The album was released on October 22, 2021, via Epitaph Records. Radical was ultimately the band's final album. The band also did a pop-up show in Buffalo on August 26, as well as a show for The Ghost Inside's east coast return show on August 28, where they debuted "Post-Boredom". The band embarked on the Radical Tour with Candy and '68 on November 4.

On December 4, 2021, Keith Buckley announced that he would be taking a hiatus from the band for his mental health. The rest of the members initially released a statement that they would finish the last three concerts of a late 2021 tour without him, but the shows were canceled due to complications arising from COVID-19. The band ultimately reconvened to perform at TID The Season in December 2021.

=== Disbandment and aftermath (2022–present) ===
In January 2022, days after canceling a UK tour, a joint statement from Jordan Buckley, Andy Williams, Stephen Micciche, and Clayton Holyoak stated they were leaving the band. They retained attorneys who requested that Keith Buckley cease using the band name until everyone had signed a legal separation document. Keith said he had been worried the others would try and replace him with another singer. Jordan said that was not an option: "There is no replacing Keith which is exactly why we never even gave it a thought. Tremendous talent. Very gifted." The departing four members said that they would continue playing together in some capacity later that month. During this time, Keith completed a six-date spoken word tour of the UK in February 2022, titled An Evening With Keith Buckley. The tour was hosted by radio DJ Matt Stocks.

In April 2023, three former band members, Jordan Buckley, Micciche, and Holyoak, announced they had formed a new band, Better Lovers, with Fit for an Autopsy guitarist Will Putney and former Dillinger Escape Plan vocalist Greg Puciato. Their debut single, "30 under 13", was released on April 17, 2023. Their debut EP, God Made Me an Animal, was released via Sharptone Records on July 7, 2023. On October 9, 2023, Keith Buckley announced that he had formed a new band with Charlie and Nick Bellmore (of Kingdom of Sorrow) called Many Eyes. The band's debut single, "Revelation", was released the following week. It served as the lead single to their debut album The Light Age, which was produced by Jamey Jasta and released on September 6, 2024, by Jasta's Perseverance Records.

On September 5, 2026, rhythm guitarist Andy Williams, who was also a professional wrestler, died after collapsing in the ring during a match at age 48.

== Musical style ==
Every Time I Die's style has been described as metalcore, hardcore punk and post-hardcore. They initially formed as a hardcore band but their music soon manifested strong influences from heavy metal and rock. They have been called "metalcore icons" and their 2003 album Hot Damn! a "total gamechanger" for the genre. AllMusic described their metalcore sound as mixing alternative metal, Southern metal and screamo. They have also experimented with mathcore and sludge metal at various points in their discography. They are strongly influenced by Southern rock; frontman Keith Buckley stated that "the grit of ... Southern rock bands is the one commonality that the band has. It's something we all appreciate and grew up on, in a sense; mainly because it was the type of music that made a coarse poetry out of nature." Additionally, Ultimate Guitar stated that the band invented "party metal".

Just as the band's sound is chaotic, sharp and manifold, their lyrics are crafted to be strange, sarcastic, and sardonic. The band's themes include real life-related topics.

== Legacy ==
Upon their 2022 breakup, many of the band's peers and contemporaries - including Underoath, Stray From the Path, Knocked Loose, Against Me! and We Came As Romans - eulogized the band with reverence for their music, their close relationship with their fans, and the support they offered to up-and-coming bands.

== Band members ==
Every Time I Die live at With Full Force 2013

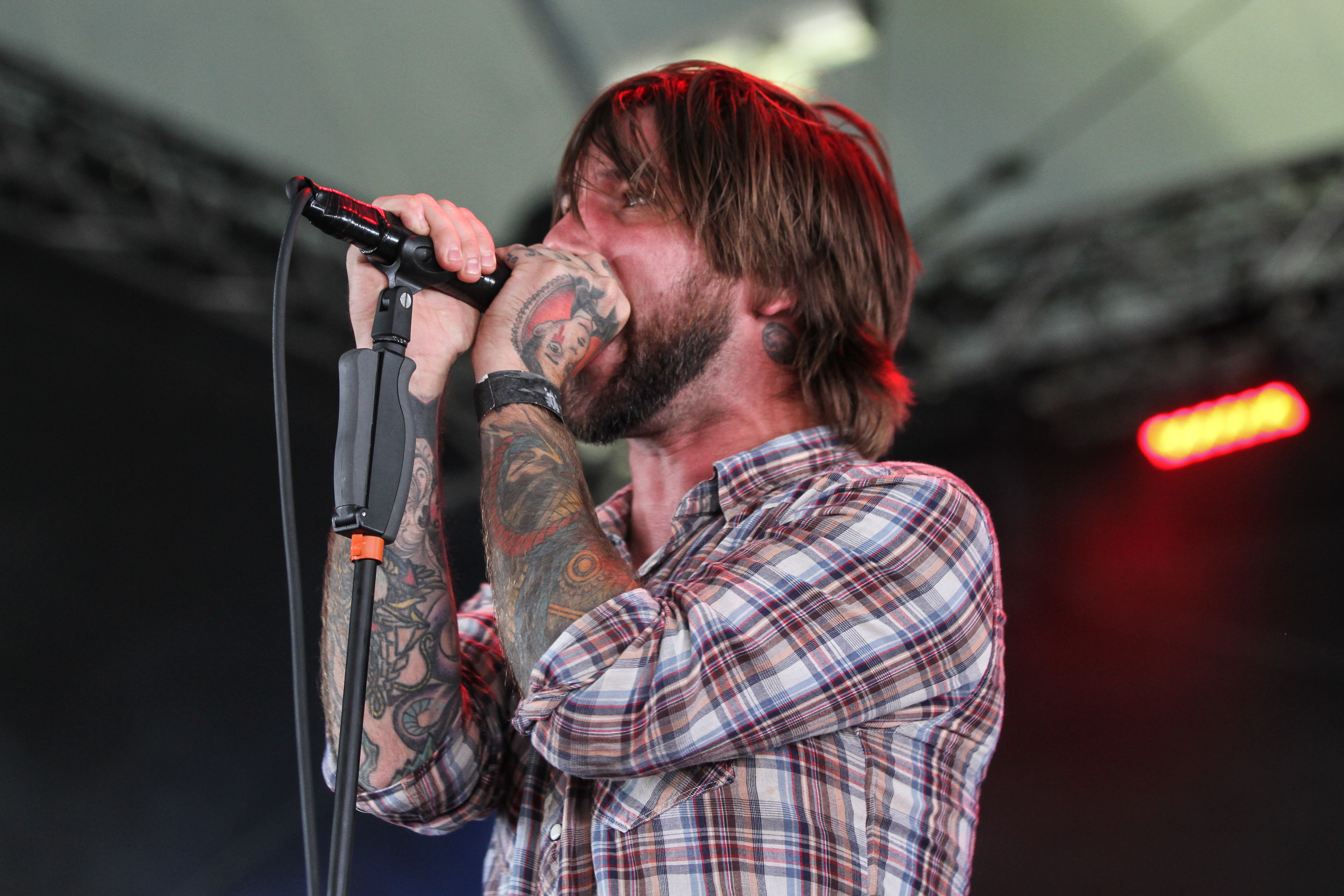
Keith Buckley

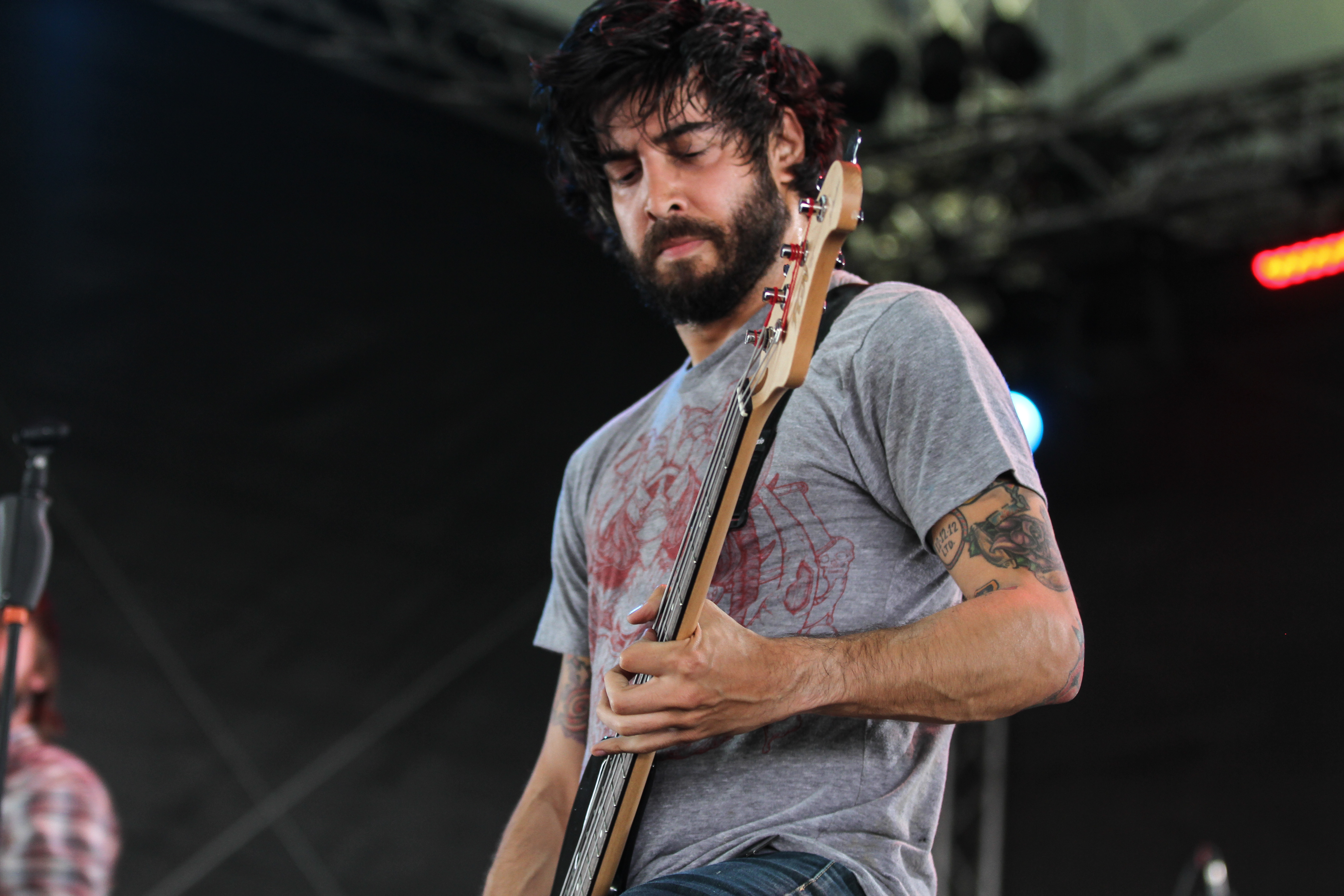
Stephen Micciche

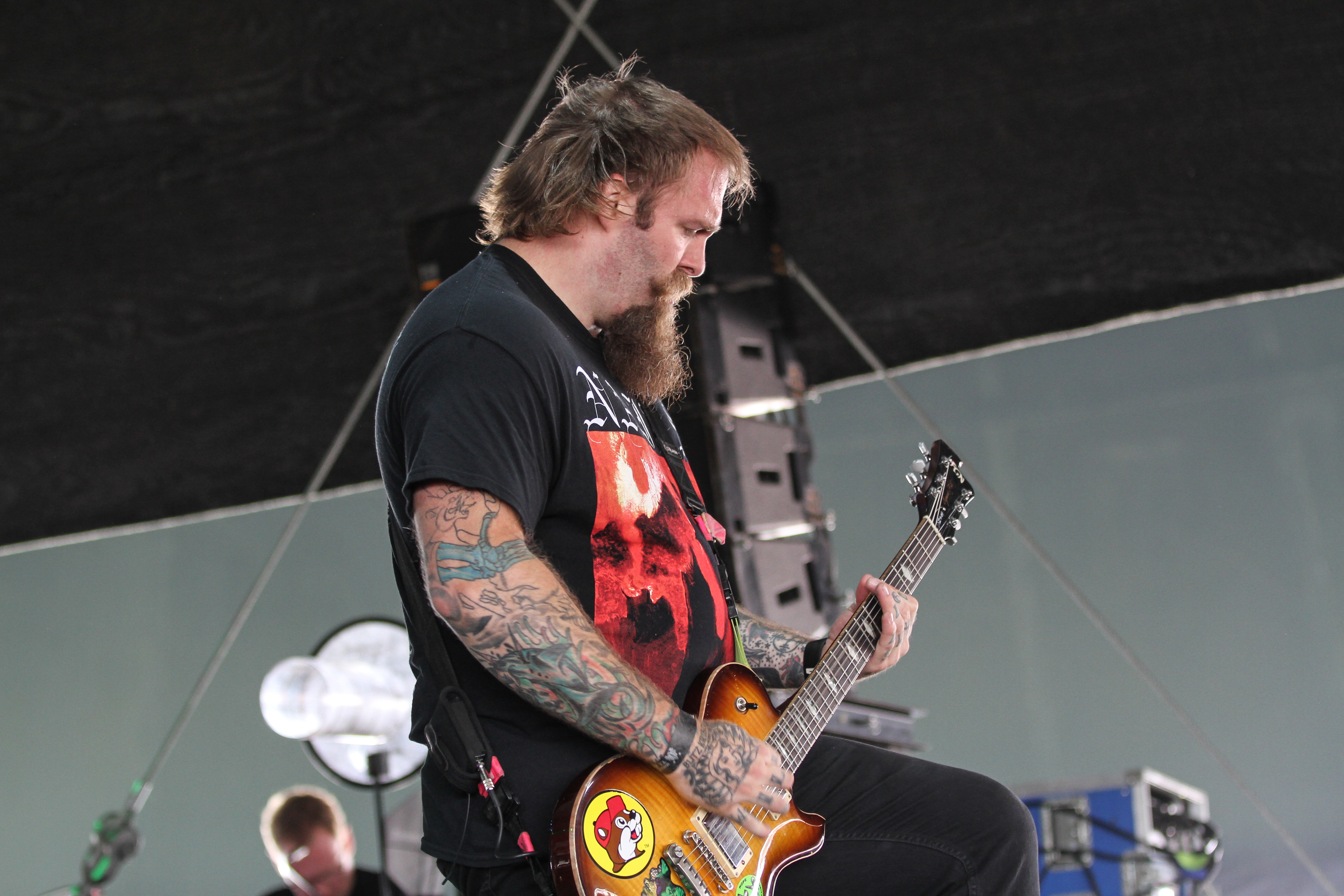
Andy Williams

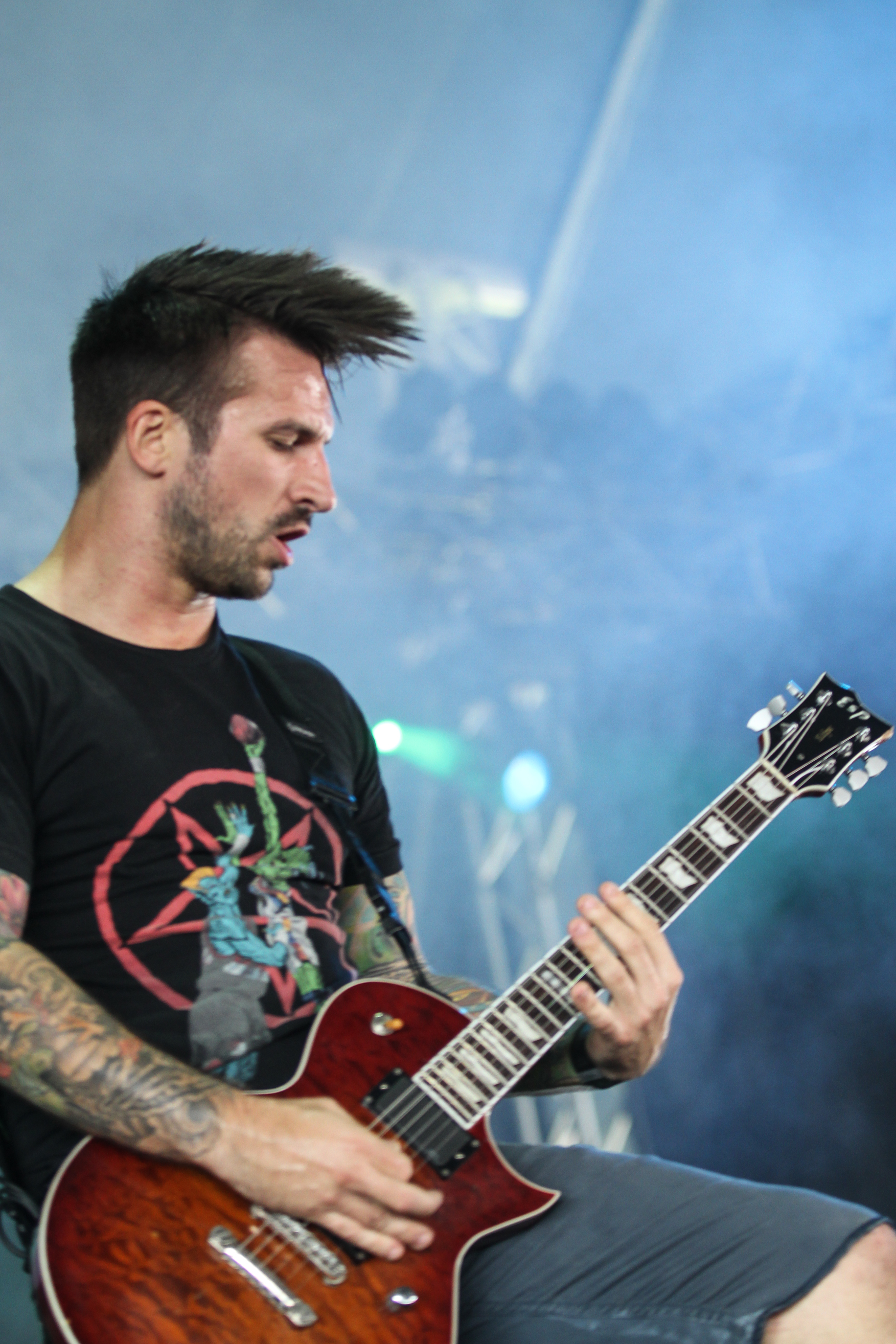
Jordan Buckley

Final lineup

- Jordan Buckley – lead guitar (1998–2022), bass (2006–2007)
- Andy Williams – rhythm guitar (1998–2022), bass (2006–2007; died 2026)
- Keith Buckley – vocals (1998–2022)
- Stephen Micciche – bass (2001–2005, 2011–2022)
- Clayton "Goose" Holyoak – drums (2017–2022)

Former

- John McCarthy – bass (1998–1999)
- Aaron Ratajczak – bass (1999–2001)
- Kevin Falk – bass (2005)
- Chris Byrnes – bass (2005–2006)
- Mike "Ratboy" Novak – drums (1998–2009)
- Josh Newton – bass (2007–2011)
- Ryan "Leg$" Leger – drums (2009–2015)
- Daniel Davison – drums (2015–2017)

Touring

- Keller Harbin – bass (2006–2007)

== Discography ==
- Last Night in Town (2001)
- Hot Damn! (2003)
- Gutter Phenomenon (2005)
- The Big Dirty (2007)
- New Junk Aesthetic (2009)
- Ex Lives (2012)
- From Parts Unknown (2014)
- Low Teens (2016)
- Radical (2021)

== Awards and nominations ==
=== Alternative Press Music Awards ===
Year	Nominee / work	Award	Result	Ref.
2015	From Parts Unknown	Album of the Year	Nominated	
2015	Jordan Buckley	Best Guitarist	Nominated	
2017	Jordan Buckley	Best Guitarist	Won	
2017	Keith Buckley	Best Vocalist	Nominated	
2017	Low Teens	Album of the Year	Nominated	

=== Metal Hammer Golden Gods Awards ===
Year	Nominee / work	Award	Result	Ref.
2008	Every Time I Die	Breakthrough Artist	Nominated	

=== SXSW Film Festival Awards ===
Year	Nominee / work	Award	Result	Ref.
2018	"Map Change"	SXSW Music Video Selections	Nominated	

== Other accolades ==
=== State honors ===
Name of country, year given, and name of honor
Country	Year	Honor	Ref.
United States	2019	Inducted into the Buffalo Music Hall of Fame	
