= Federal Prisoner =

American independent record label

- Founded: 2018
- Founder: Greg Puciato; Jesse Draxler
- Genre: Experimental, industrial, electronic, alternative
- Country of origin: United States
- Location: Los Angeles, California
- Official website: federalprisoner.com

Federal Prisoner is an American independent record label founded in 2018 by musician Greg Puciato and visual artist Jesse Draxler. Based in Los Angeles, California, the label releases music alongside books, films, and limited-edition physical items, and has issued work by Puciato, the Black Queen, Draxler, Annihilus, Trace Amount, Sore Dream, God Is War, and Black Magnet.

== History ==
=== Founding and early releases (2018–2019) ===
Puciato, formerly of the Dillinger Escape Plan, and Draxler, a longtime visual collaborator of Puciato's band the Black Queen, founded Federal Prisoner in 2018 in order to retain full ownership and control of their creative output. The label's first release was the Black Queen's second album, Infinite Games (2018). The following year it published Separate the Dawn, a book of Puciato's poetry and photography.

=== Expansion (2020) ===
In 2020, Federal Prisoner released Puciato's debut solo album, Child Soldier: Creator of God. That September, the label issued Reigning Cement, an audiovisual project in which Draxler asked more than twenty musicians—including Chelsea Wolfe, Trentemøller, Ghostemane, Uniform, Portrayal of Guilt, and Full of Hell's Dylan Walker—to build tracks from a fixed set of environmental sound recordings he supplied; the album was accompanied by a 100-page book of Draxler's photography. The label also announced a vinyl edition of the score to Rob Sheridan's graphic novel High Level, composed by the Black Queen's Steven Alexander Ryan and Justin McGrath. In December 2020, Federal Prisoner presented Fuck Content, a performance film by Puciato that debuted as a 48-hour streaming event and was followed by a companion live album.

=== Reissues and roster growth (2021–2022) ===
In February 2021, the label marked the fifth anniversary of the Black Queen's debut album Fever Daydream (2016) with new vinyl pressings and a deluxe digital edition featuring instrumental and a cappella versions, bonus recordings, and demos. That June, the label announced its first release not involving either founder: Follow a Song from the Sky, the second album by Annihilus, the one-man black metal project of Chicago musician Luca Cimarusti, released on August 13, 2021. Draxler said he contacted Cimarusti after listening to the project's 2020 album Ghanima.

In 2022, Federal Prisoner released Tears of a Blistered World by Sore Dream, the electronic duo of Full of Hell's Spencer Hazard and Dylan Walker; Anti Body Language, the debut album by Brooklyn industrial project Trace Amount, featuring guest appearances by Kanga and Statiqbloom and cover art by Draxler; and the EP I Have No Enemies, I Permit No Such Thing by Los Angeles electronic act God Is War. Puciato's second solo album, Mirrorcell, followed on July 1, 2022, after an early Bandcamp release prompted by a leak. In December 2022, the label issued 11/11/22: Los Angeles, a live album documenting Puciato's debut concert as a solo artist, recorded the previous month at the Don Quixote venue in Los Angeles.

=== Black Magnet and Tongue of Angels (2025–2026) ===
In 2025, Federal Prisoner signed the Oklahoma City industrial metal band Black Magnet, previously with 20 Buck Spin, and released the group's third album, Megamantra, on July 25, 2025.

Beginning in April 2025, Draxler issued a series of collaborative singles—with Presser, OAA, Trace Amount, and God Is War, among others—leading up to his second album, Tongue of Angels, scheduled for release on July 31, 2026, through Federal Prisoner. Like Reigning Cement, the album is built from field recordings supplied by Draxler and reworked by more than twenty collaborators, including Zola Jesus, Ho99o9, Iggor Cavalera, Ian Astbury, Lord Spikeheart, and Black Asteroid; Draxler described the project as "a system where authorship is distributed but never dissolved".

== Aesthetic ==
The label's visual identity draws on Draxler's largely monochromatic fine art, and its releases frequently take the form of limited physical editions with artwork and apparel designed by him. Puciato has described the label's ethos as one of "aggressive honesty" and independence from conventional music-industry structures.

== Artists ==
Artists who have released work through Federal Prisoner include:

- Greg Puciato
- The Black Queen
- Jesse Draxler
- Annihilus
- Black Magnet
- Trace Amount
- Sore Dream
- God Is War
- Steven Alexander Ryan and Justin McGrath

== Selected releases ==
Year	Artist	Title	Notes
2018	The Black Queen	Infinite Games	First label release
2019	Greg Puciato	Separate the Dawn	Book of poetry and photography
2020	Greg Puciato	Child Soldier: Creator of God	
2020	Jesse Draxler	Reigning Cement	Album with accompanying photo book
2020	Greg Puciato	Fuck Content	Performance film and live album
2021	The Black Queen	Fever Daydream (5 Year Anniversary Deluxe Edition)	Reissue
2021	Annihilus	Follow a Song from the Sky	
2022	Sore Dream	Tears of a Blistered World	
2022	Trace Amount	Anti Body Language	
2022	God Is War	I Have No Enemies, I Permit No Such Thing	EP
2022	Greg Puciato	Mirrorcell	
2022	Greg Puciato	11/11/22: Los Angeles	Live album
2025	Black Magnet	Megamantra	
2026	Jesse Draxler	Tongue of Angels	Scheduled for release on July 31, 2026
