= Child Soldier: Creator of God =

Studio album by Greg Puciato
- Released: October 1, 2020
- Genre: Experimental metal, alternative metal, industrial metal, synthwave, extreme metal
- Label: Federal Prisoner
- Producer: Nick Rowe

Greg Puciato chronology
Child Soldier: Creator of God (2020)	Mirrorcell (2022)

Singles from Child Soldier: Creator of God
- 1. "Fire for Water" Released: March 2, 2020; 2. "Deep Set" Released: May 1, 2020; 3. "Do You Need Me to Remind You?" Released: July 10, 2020; 4. "Roach Hiss" Released: July 30, 2020; 5. "A Pair of Questions" Released: August 28, 2020

Child Soldier: Creator of God is the debut solo album by American musician Greg Puciato of the Black Queen and the disbanded the Dillinger Escape Plan, released through his own Federal Prisoner record label. It was originally set to be released on October 23, 2020, but due to a leak, Puciato decided to release it three weeks early on October 1, 2020.

Puciato plays all instruments on the album, with the exception of drums which are done by Chris Hornbrook, Chris Pennie and Ben Koller.

Metal Hammer named it as the 45th best metal album of 2020.

== Background ==
In March 2019, Puciato finished the last North American leg of the tour in support of the Black Queen album Infinite Games. While touring, he reconnected with the Dillinger Escape Plan original drummer Chris Pennie who attended one of their shows in New York City. Both musicians were close friends in Dillinger but lost contact following the latter's departure from the band in 2006. On one of the last shows of the tour, the Black Queen invited drummer Chris Hornbrook from Poison the Well to play "Apocalypse Morning", the final song of the set. Hornbrook first met Puciato on the 2003 Take Action Tour and was also part of an early, less electronic incarnation of the Black Queen before they had released any music. The last shows of that tour were increasingly aggressive and mirrored some of Greg Puciato's performances in Dillinger.

== Writing and recording ==
... When I was writing [Creator of God], I realised it wasn't The Black Queen. I kind of went, 'Well, what is this?' And I just kept going. And that's been the basis for the start of every other thing that I've done, too – very need-based. It wouldn't have fit in Dillinger Escape Plan, it doesn't fit in The Black Queen, it doesn't fit in Killer Be Killed. This was sort of stunning for me, the way the [2019] book [Separate the Dawn] was. ... I didn't sit down and say to myself, 'Okay, strategically, now it's time for me to write a solo record.' I just wrote a bunch of things that [coincidentally] didn't have any other home.

— Puciato, 2020

After taking around a month off, Puciato began to compose steadily around May 2019 for what he thought would be the next Black Queen album. When three or four songs were finished, he realized that they would not fit the style of that band and initially decided to make a solo EP, but the music kept "outpouring" until he had fifteen tracks that spanned more than an hour. While he created the majority of the songs during this period, he went back to some music that he did not use or left unfinished in the past, some before 2016's Dissociation and one as far back as 2006, all of which suited Child Soldier: Creator of God. At first, the planned title of the record was Creator of God and Puciato would use the moniker "Child Soldier", but eventually he decided to use both for the album and release it under his real name after discussing it with his friend Jerry Cantrell, who had also made solo albums in the wake of a successful career as part of a band (Alice in Chains).

Shortly after Hornbrook ended an American tour with Dhani Harrison on August 1, 2019 as a support act for Jeff Lynne's ELO, he was contacted by Puciato to participate on the album. Both musicians bonded over, among other things, early 1990s grunge, a style whose grooves Puciato wanted on several songs.

Child Soldier: Creator of God was recorded in Los Angeles from 2019 to early 2020 with producer Nick Rowe and afterward mixed by Steve Evetts. According to Advanced Alternative Media, the album will reflect Rowe's vision of "simplicity, flavor, and heaviness".

== Music ==
The music of Child Soldier: Creator of God ranges from extreme metal to synth-pop and diverse genres in between, but it does not reflect the other bands from Puciato, and he displayed a significant "creative freedom" in the composition process. Following the "toxic energy" he "got rid of" with the 2019 book Separate the Dawn, Puciato did not consider to make aggressive music, but it grew naturally in him, "in a way that felt very empowering" instead of draining, and several songs touched on it. He described the album as "sort of celebrating integration" and "celebrating owning every aspect of your personality."

== Promotion and limited editions ==
Child Soldier: Creator of God was announced on March 2, 2020, alongside the release of the single and music video for the song "Fire for Water". Premiered the day before on BBC Radio 1, "Fire for Water" features Dillinger original drummer Chris Pennie and was limited to 250 copies that sold out within minutes.

The album was originally set for release in August 2020, but was later push back to October 23, 2020 due to the effects of the COVID-19 pandemic.

On May 1, Puciato released the second single of the album, "Deep Set", limited to 250 copies that sold out in minutes as well, together with its music video premiered on Consequence of Sound. Its cover artwork is an homage to Soundgarden's 1989 record Louder Than Love. On May 8, Puciato released a green variant vinyl for "Deep Set", which was also limited to 250 copies. On July 10, both the third single of the album, "Do You Need Me to Remind You?", and its accompanying music video were released via Revolver. The video was shot just a week before its release. The single of "Do You Need Me to Remind You?" had two vinyl variants limited to 250 copies each. That day, Puciato revealed the release date of Child Soldier: Creator of God.

On July 30, Puciato premiered the song "Roach Hiss", with Ben Koller on drums, and announced a Revolver magazine's joint bundle release that includes four items: a copy of Child Soldier: Creator of God, another of the "Roach Hiss" single, an issue of Revolver featuring Puciato on the cover, and a slipcase printed by Dominion Carton. This special release was limited to 500 copies.

== Track listing ==
All lyrics are written by Greg Puciato.

Child Soldier: Creator of God track listing
No.	Title	Music	Length
1.	"Heaven of Stone"	Puciato	1:24
2.	"Creator of God"	Puciato, Nick Rowe, Chris Pennie	4:04
3.	"Fire for Water"	Puciato, Rowe, Pennie	2:56
4.	"Deep Set"	Puciato	3:44
5.	"Temporary Object"	Puciato, Rowe, Pennie	4:12
6.	"Fireflies"	Puciato, Rowe, Pennie	4:38
7.	"Do You Need Me to Remind You?"	Puciato	6:18
8.	"Roach Hiss"	Puciato	4:53
9.	"Down When I'm Not"	Puciato	3:06
10.	"You Know I Do"	Puciato, Rowe	6:07
11.	"Through the Walls"	Puciato, Rowe	4:02
12.	"A Pair of Questions"	Puciato, Rowe	4:24
13.	"Evacuation"	Puciato, Rowe	5:04
14.	"Heartfree"	Puciato, Rowe	5:04
15.	"September City"	Puciato, Rowe	4:50
Total length:			64:46

== Personnel ==
- Greg Puciato – vocals, instrumentation
- Nick Rowe – instrumentation, production
- Chris Pennie – drums (2, 3), drum programming (3)
- Chris Hornbrook – drums (4, 7, 9, 10, 14, 15)
- Ben Koller – drums (8)
- Alan Douches – mastering
- Steve Evetts – mixing
- Jesse Draxler – layout, design, artwork

== Charts ==
Chart performance for Child Soldier: Creator of God
Chart (2020)	Peak position
Australian Albums (ARIA)	69
