= Fever Daydream =

2016 studio album by the Black Queen

Studio album by The Black Queen
- Released: January 29, 2016
- Recorded: 2015, Los Angeles, California
- Genre: Synthwave
- Length: 42:51
- Label: Self-released; Universal
- Producer: The Black Queen; Justin Meldal-Johnsen (exec.)

The Black Queen chronology
Fever Daydream (2016)	Infinite Games (2018)

Singles from Fever Daydream
- 1. "The End Where We Start" Released: June 14, 2015; 2. "Ice to Never" Released: August 8, 2015

Fever Daydream is the debut studio album by American electronic band The Black Queen. It was released independently on January 29, 2016. The album was released in Australia under Universal Music Australia and was initially limited to 1,000 copies.

== Background and composition ==
In January 2013, Greg Puciato of The Dillinger Escape Plan revealed plans for a new project with Joshua Eustis in an interview with Revolver, later releasing a teaser video on their official homepage under the name The Black Queen in 2015.

On June 14, 2015, the band revealed the first single from their then-unnamed album, "The End Where We Start" on BBC Radio 1 Rock Show. They released its accompanying music video on their official YouTube account two days later. The single was later released physically with 233 limited edition copies made available for purchase on 12" vinyl, sold only from the band's official website.

233 limited edition 12" vinyl copies of "Ice to Never" were made available for purchase on the band's homepage. The release contains the album version of the song, a shorter "single" version, and an extended version. The music video for "Ice to Never" was released in September 2015.

Fever Daydream became available for purchase through their official Bandcamp account on January 29, 2016, limited to 1,000 copies on black vinyl and CD, as well as worldwide in independent record stores. A final version of Fever Daydream, limited to 233 copies, was released on white vinyl with an alternate cover. This cover is an inversion of the cover from the clear vinyl release.

The music of Fever Daydream has been described by music critics as new wave, dream pop, and ambient music.

== Reception ==
Professional ratings
Aggregate scores
Source	Rating
Metacritic	74/100
Review scores
Source	Rating
AllMusic	3.5/5 stars
Alternative Press	3.5./5 stars
Exclaim!	6/10
Kerrang!	4/5 stars
Revolver	3.5/5 stars
Spin	7/10

Fever Daydream received positive reviews by music critics. At Metacritic, which assigns a rating out of 100 to reviews from mainstream critics, the album has an average score of 74 based on 7 reviews, indicating "generally favorable reviews". The Independent called the album "an apocalyptic melting pot of gentle electronica and soulful R&B-inflected vocals, infused with an undercurrent of Lynchian paranoia."

== Track listing ==
All music is composed by The Black Queen.

No.	Title	Length
1.	"Now, When I'm This"	1:45
2.	"Ice to Never"	4:46
3.	"The End Where We Start"	4:03
4.	"Secret Scream"	3:21
5.	"Maybe We Should / Non-Consent"	5:38
6.	"Distanced"	4:46
7.	"Strange Quark"	2:29
8.	"That Death Cannot Touch"	3:50
9.	"Taman Shud"	5:26
10.	"Apocalypse Morning"	6:47
Total length:		42:51

== Charts ==
Chart (2016)	Peak position
US Heatseekers Albums (Billboard)	4
US Independent Albums (Billboard)	18
US Top Dance/Electronic Albums (Billboard)	2

== Personnel ==
The Black Queen

- Greg Puciato − lead vocals, production
- Joshua Eustis − keyboards, programming, guitar, production
- Steven "Asian Steve" Alexander − keyboards, guitar, programming, production

Technical

- Justin Meldal-Johnsen − executive production
- Jesse Draxler − artwork and design
