= Greg Puciato =

American musician (born 1980)

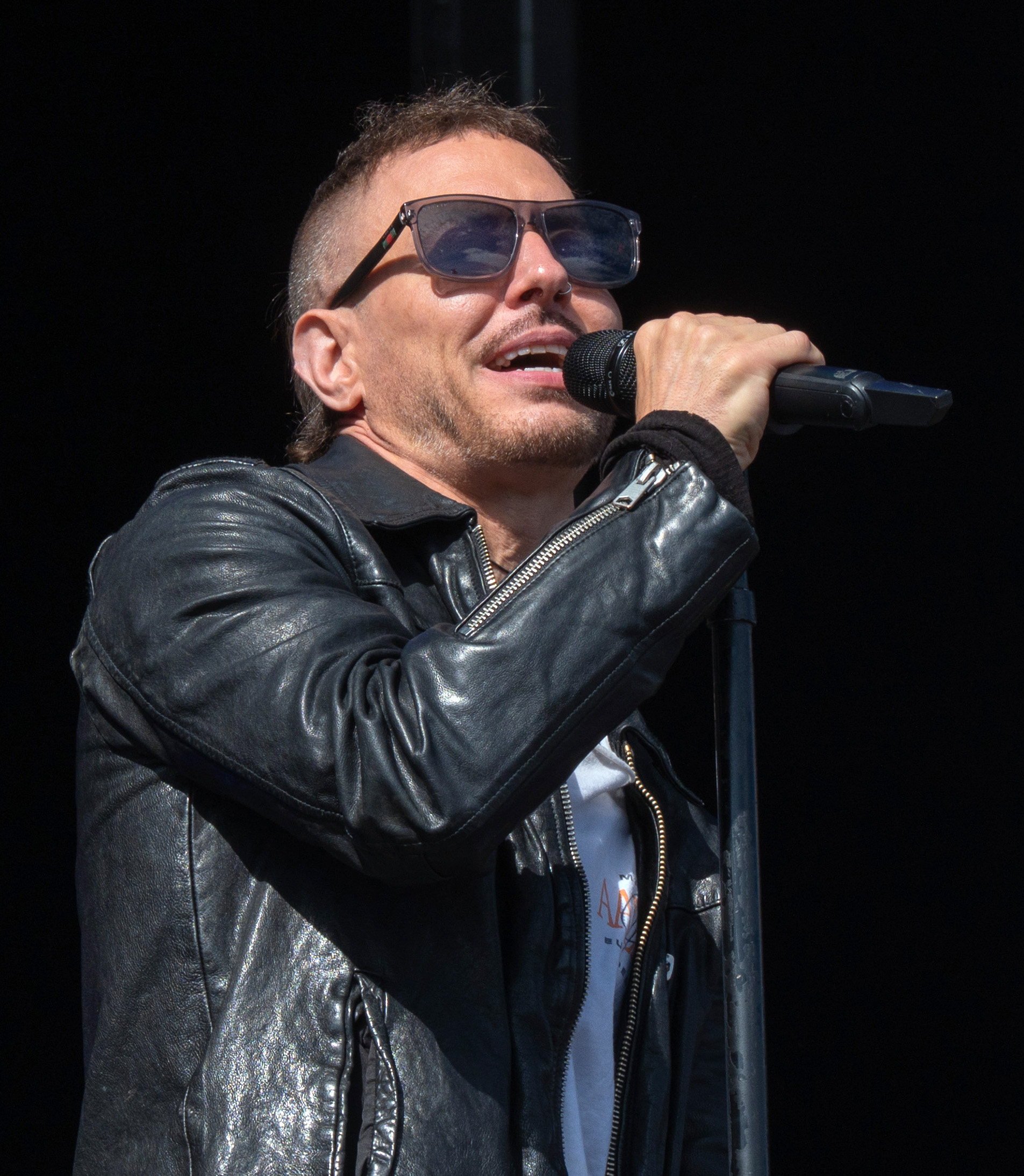
- Puciato at Tons of Rock 2025

Background information
- Born: Gregory John Puciato; March 27, 1980 (age 46); Baltimore, Maryland, U.S.
- Genres: Metalcore; mathcore; groove metal; alternative metal; synthwave; hardcore punk
- Occupations: Singer; musician; songwriter
- Instruments: Vocals; guitar
- Years active: 2001–present
- Member of: The Black Queen; Killer Be Killed
- Formerly of: The Dillinger Escape Plan; Spylacopa; Better Lovers

Gregory John Puciato (born March 27, 1980) is an American musician best known as the former lead vocalist and lyricist of the mathcore band the Dillinger Escape Plan. In addition to being a solo artist, he fronts the band the Black Queen, and is a member of Killer Be Killed, in which he also plays guitar. He also performed alongside Jerry Cantrell from 2019 to 2025, providing backup vocals and lead vocals on Layne Staley-sung songs for Cantrell's solo tours. In early 2023 he co-founded and fronted the metal/hardcore/rock supergroup Better Lovers, before leaving in early 2026. In 2018, Puciato and visual artist Jesse Draxler co-founded the art collective and record label Federal Prisoner.

Puciato is noted for the intensity of his live performances, wide vocal and stylistic range, outspoken views, and controversy stemming from his bands' performances and interviews. Rolling Stone said that "few singers live, breathe and often literally bleed their art like he does." In 2023, Jake Richardson of Loudwire described his style as "echoing [The Dillinger Escape Plan]'s varied and technically proficient take on metalcore."

== Early life ==
Puciato was born and raised in Baltimore, Maryland. He is an only child. His Belarusian ancestors came to the United States from Slutsk. Puciato's parents owned many vinyl records by artists such as Elton John, Bee Gees, Prince, Black Sabbath, Mitch Miller and Molly Hatchet, as well as an old victrola, and they bought him a small 7-inch record player. They listened to music constantly and Puciato's early memories include beating on things to drum along, and singing along, it. In recent years, Puciato revealed that he grew up in a dangerous, poor neighborhood, which "giant[ly]" influenced him in the sense that he does not "feel uncomfortable in any area," while the African-American culture of the area led to his fondness for R&B and hip-hop. As a child, Guns N' Roses was the first band Puciato was "obsessed with." Around the age of nine, he saw Metallica's video for "One", which was the "darkest thing [he had watched]" and inspired him to learn Metallica songs on the guitar. During this period, he describes his life as centered around thrash metal and Nintendo. In early 1990, Puciato went "through a really rapid musical evolution," broadening his taste to bands such as Faith No More and Primus. When recalling the appearance of these or other artists such as Nine Inch Nails on TV, he viewed it as "inspiring" and said it "seemed like the weirdos had infiltrated the system, or created a new one." Puciato had several older friends who traded tapes and they would introduce him to underground music; when Puciato told one of them which were his favorites bands, his friend gave him a tape of I Against I by Bad Brains that "blew [his] mind apart" and subsequently showed him a 1980s' Bad Brains live bootleg that would make a long-standing impression on the singer. In 2013 he reflected:

[My older friend] would tell me, "Check out this fucking weird zine and check out this tape of the Bad Brains." And I thought: "Wait, I've never heard that band, they're nobody! Are they Slayer? Are they Testament? Are they Exodus? Are they Anthrax? Why don't they cover them in Metal Edge?!" ... I had no idea this even existed but then I watched it and I was like, "This is the craziest shit I've ever seen! Not only are they black, but he's got crazy vibrato on his voice, he's doing flips, people are crowd surfing and stage diving, ... That guy just jumped on his head? What the hell is happening here?! That's beyond the circle pit in a giant club or an arena. They're in a room that looks like my basement just freaking out!" That was what really pushed me into performing the way I do. Anything that has to do with punk rock or hardcore, all came from seeing the Bad Brains at that age.

Puciato recorded his first cassette at thirteen, performing original music with his best friend who was a drummer. When he was a teenager, Puciato began to write abstract poetry, his first passion in parallel to songwriting. At the age of fourteen, Puciato started singing for a thrash metal group. While originally their guitarist, he switched to vocals because he was "too much of a control freak to let someone else sing" and could not perform both at the same time, but he continued writing the band's songs on guitar. After people started praising his singing ability and Puciato realized that it came more naturally to him, he shifted his focus to vocals.

Although raised in a non-practicing home, Puciato attended a Catholic private school. He was a good student and skipped grades, graduating one month after he turned 17. He went to college in Maryland and after a year of studying he took a break, during which he was invited to join the Dillinger Escape Plan.

== Career ==
=== The Dillinger Escape Plan ===
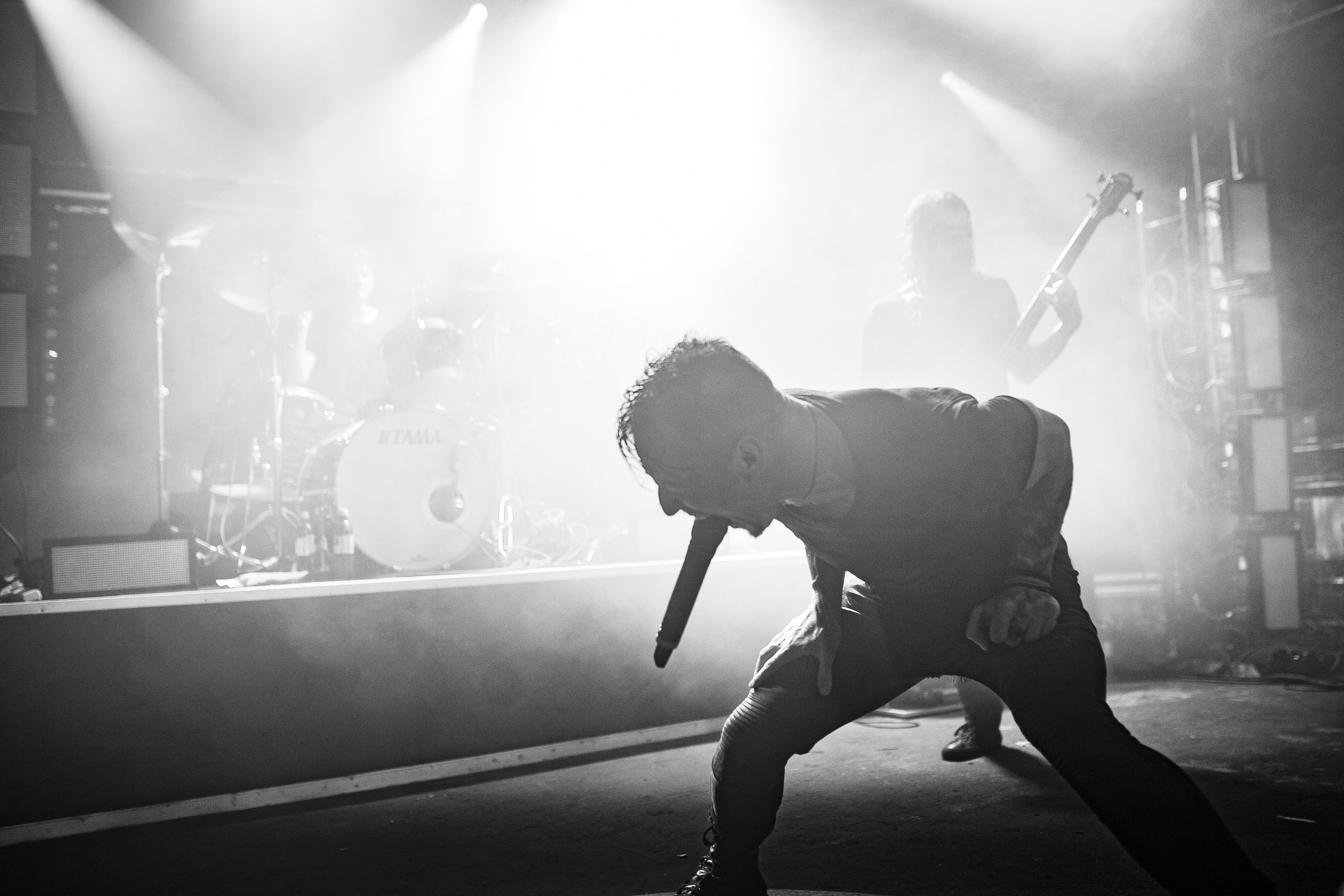
Puciato performing with the Dillinger Escape Plan in Leipzig, 2017

Puciato joined mathcore band the Dillinger Escape Plan in September 2001 and first performed with the group weeks later at the CMJ music conference in October 2001. Puciato had already played in some bands from the Baltimore-Washington metropolitan area, but, at that time, he preferred to refine his vocal style than commit full-time to a band, and waited for the "right opportunity" to do so. In a scenario mirroring that of young Henry Rollins and Black Flag, Puciato started out as a fan of the Dillinger Escape Plan in their earlier days. When the band split with their singer Dimitri Minakakis (due to him wanting to focus more on his graphic design career and personal life), they searched publicly for a new singer by releasing the instrumental version of the song "43% Burnt" (off of their debut album). Puciato sent in a tape with one version of him mimicking Dimitri Minakakis and one with his own take on the song. He was contacted shortly after by the band, auditioned in person, and was subsequently asked to join. Coincidentally, the band's first release with Puciato was for a Black Flag tribute compilation, where they covered "Damaged I and II". In a 2003 interview, Puciato said that the band had gone on to "mean everything to" him. Commenting on his entrance to the band in 2013, Puciato recalled:

It was definitely weird. I pretty much separate my life by Dillinger and pre-Dillinger. I was only twenty-one when I joined, so before that is like childhood to me. ... I didn't really get a chance to stop and think about it ... But now, looking back, I don't know what else I would be doing. This band and the music that we're playing and the creative relationship that [guitarist] Ben [Weinman] and I have... not that I believe that things happen for a reason, but I could not have found a better vehicle for my skill set as a writer and performer than this band. I wouldn't be writing aggressive music or playing in any other capacity. I believe that people manifest their destiny, somewhat, so I think that Dillinger and I are on a great journey and that we were supposed to meet.

Puciato sang on every subsequent release.

In August 2016, he told Metal Hammer magazine that the previously announced Dillinger "hiatus" was in fact a "break up" and explained the artistic reasoning for doing so.

=== Spylacopa ===
Puciato was involved with Spylacopa, an experimental musical project headed by Candiria guitarist John LaMacchia (along with Julie Christmas of Made Out of Babies and Jeff Caxide of Isis). Spylacopa released a self-titled EP in 2008, with vocals, as well as some guitar and piano/programming, written by Puciato. Similar programming and piano playing would appear on the Dillinger Escape Plan's Option Paralysis album as the bonus track "Chuck McChip". Puciato affirmed in 2012 that Spylacopa is "dead as of now."

=== Killer Be Killed ===
In February 2011, Max Cavalera, in an interview with Swedish magazine Metalshrine, revealed that he and Puciato were working on a full-length album, similar in style to Cavalera's Nailbomb project. The band, later named Killer Be Killed, was announced in 2013 to feature former Mars Volta drummer Dave Elitch, and Troy Sanders of Mastodon. In September 2013 the band recorded their self-titled debut album at Fortress Studio in Los Angeles with producer Josh Wilbur. It was released on May 13, 2014. The sophomore release Reluctant Hero was released on November 20, 2020, with Elitch having been replaced in the interim years by Ben Koller of Converge.

=== The Black Queen ===
Puciato announced in an interview with Revolver Magazine that he was involved in a new band with Josh Eustis and Nine Inch Nails/A Perfect Circle guitar technician Steven Alexander, called the Black Queen, with a release originally expected at some stage in 2014. The band posted their first song, "The End Where We Start", and an explanation for the long wait in June 2015. The debut album Fever Daydream was self-released on January 29, 2016, debuting at number 2 on the Billboard Electronic chart.

On June 15, 2018, the band announced that a new album called Infinite Games would be released on September 28, as well as the formation of a label named Federal Prisoner with frequent visual collaborator and fine artist Jesse Draxler.

=== Federal Prisoner ===
In June 2018, Puciato announced the formation of the record label and art collective Federal Prisoner, as well as its first release, the Black Queen's second album Infinite Games. Co-founded by him and visual artist Jesse Draxler, he called the label "as much an act of refusal as it is a statement of intent", further elaborating in a blog post for Spotify that they would be "giving more than we would be gaining" by signing to an outside label, and that "everything I used to see as help, I suddenly saw as unnecessary at best, and a liability at worst."

Puciato sees Federal Prisoner as an "infrastructure" to release material dear to them rather than a label which tries "to go out there to sign this really big artist." Federal Prisoner started off completely from scratch and its output has been independently released and funded in every way, including international distribution and music videos, without being assisted by other labels.

The template for the label was established in the 2016 Black Queen's debut record, Fever Daydream, where Puciato set about developing every aspect of the album by themselves (i.e. him, his bandmates Alexander and Eustis, and Draxler), both musically and non-musically, tackling record pressings, merchandise, managing, etc. The Independent commented that the enterprise involved "a wealth of difficulties", stating that "they could have easily secured label funding considering the associations that each member has with established bands", yet Puciato saw it as rewarding because in the end they did not "corrupt" any aspect of the band, in particular its aesthetic, which "is on everything [the album] touches [from the creative end to the release end]." When Fever Daydream was released, the singer was initially against the use of a moniker but later changed his mind after discussing the logistics with Draxler.

=== Better Lovers ===
In 2023, Puciato formed Better Lovers along with former Every Time I Die members (guitarist Jordan Buckley, bassist Stephen Micciche, and drummer Clayton Holyoak) as well as producer and Fit for an Autopsy guitarist Will Putney. They released their debut album Highly Irresponsible on October 25, 2024. It was announced on February 24th, 2026 that Puciato parted ways with the band.

=== Solo career ===
On March 1, 2020, Puciato premiered the single "Fire For Water" on BBC Radio 1, featuring Dillinger original drummer Chris Pennie. The next day, he released a music video for the song on Revolver. The surprise single was the first off of his debut solo album, Child Soldier: Creator of God, announced that day, which will be released through Federal Prisoner. On May 1, Puciato released the second single "Deep Set" alongside its music video premiered on Consequence of Sound. Both 12-inch vinyls were limited to 250 copies and each sold out within hours, but digital editions remain available. More singles were released, culminating in Child Soldier: Creator of God, a 15-song multi-genre album released early due to a leak on October 9, 2020. The live album/video release "Fuck Content" followed later in the same year, with five new songs and eleven live songs. In 2022 he released his sophomore LP Mirrorcell.

=== Guest work and non-musical ===
In 2003, Puciato was set to sing on The Calculus of Evil album by technical death metal band Psychotegen, but ultimately Mike Harris from Misery Index filled that role.

In 2004, Puciato sang all of the vocals on the five-song, self-titled EP of digital hardcore band Error, founded by future Nine Inch Nails member Atticus Ross and Epitaph Records owner/Bad Religion guitarist Brett Gurewitz. His position was mainly considered as temporary studio work due to his priorities with the Dillinger Escape Plan, and the band never played any concerts. Puciato affirmed in 2012 that Error is "dead as of now."

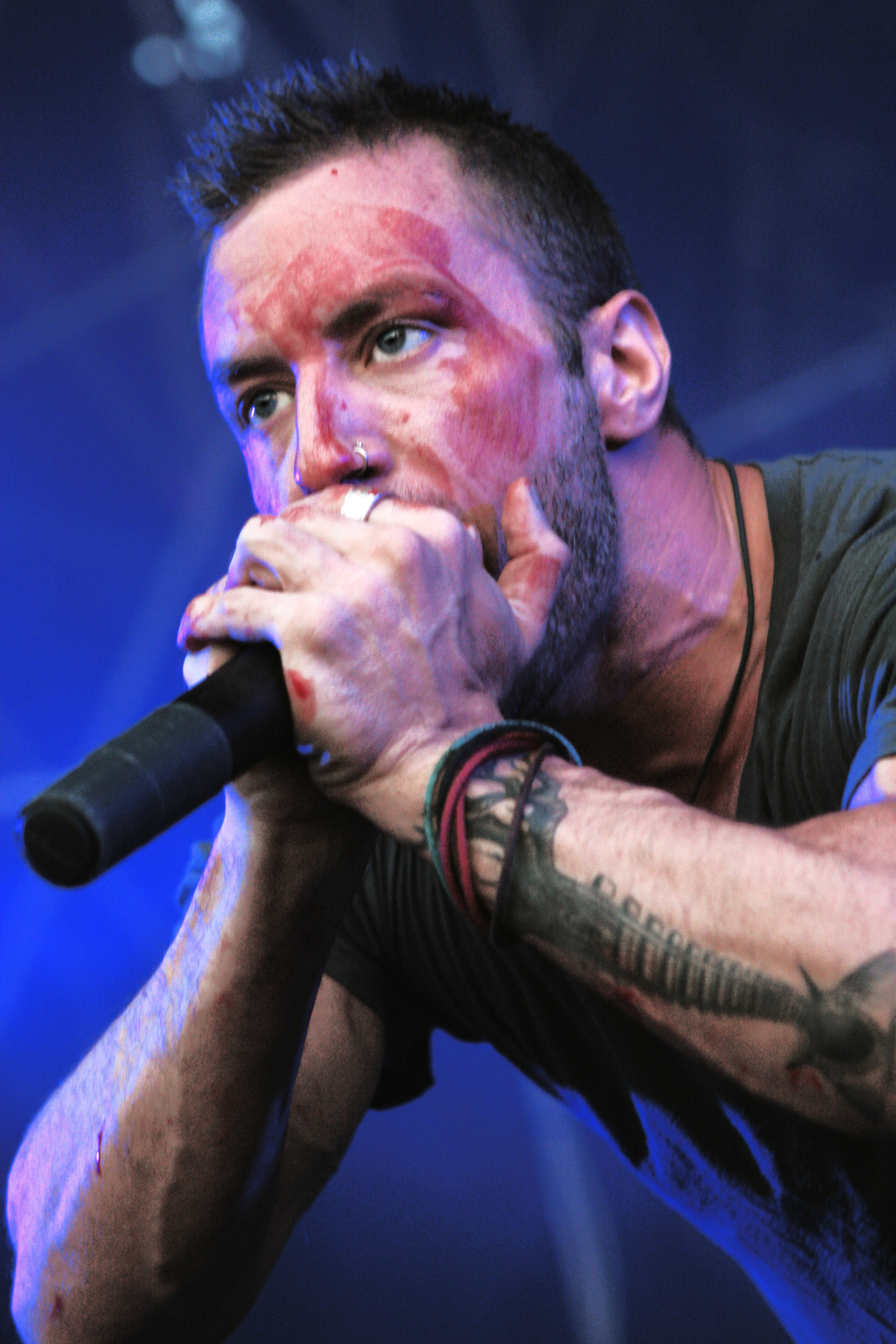
Puciato in 2011

Puciato has recorded guest vocals on several songs: "The Feast" by Genghis Tron (2008), "The Pledge" by A Static Lullaby (2008), "The Marvelous Slut" by Every Time I Die (2009), "Rise of the Fallen" by Soulfly (2010), "Year In/Year Out" by Architects (2011), "The Mighty Masturbator" by Devin Townsend (2011), "Exit Wound" by Mixhell (2012), "Monster Within" by Suicide Silence (2014), "Torches" by Lamb of God (2015) and "Everyone Dies and Nothing Goes On" by Jesse Draxler (2020). He has on occasion joined Soulfly and Devin Townsend on stage to sing his parts. The collaboration between Puciato and Townsend came about in February 2011, after both being Tweeted by a fan expressing interest in seeing them work together.

He contributed a remix of the song "Bad Fall" on the 2009 Prong remix album Power of the Damn Mixxxer.

In January 2015, Puciato appeared as a murderer in the Retox video "Let's Not Keep in Touch", in which he chases and kills Retox guitar player Michael Crain with a baseball bat, before dumping him out of a van which frontman Justin Pearson is driving. In December 2016, Puciato appeared as a dancing shadow figure in the Drab Majesty video "39 By Design".

He and the Dillinger Escape Plan repeatedly joined the stage with Nine Inch Nails during their 2009 Wave Goodbye Tour in North America, and in Australia (both with the Dillinger Escape Plan, and solo, performing the songs "Wish" and "Mr. Self Destruct"). On November 19–20, 2009, as part of the Chi Cheng benefit show at the Avalon Hollywood, he sang the Deftones songs "Passenger" and "Hexagram", both with Chino Moreno, as well as the Metallica classic "Battery" alongside members of Deftones, Metallica, System of a Down and Children of Bodom. He performed "Passenger" again most nights on the 2011 Deftones/Dillinger Escape Plan North American tour. On May 4, 2015, Puciato and Andrew Kline of Strife were invited on stage by Cavalera Conspiracy in Los Angeles for a cover of "Pay to Cum" by the Bad Brains.

Puciato wrote the foreword for Jesse Draxler's June 2018 visual arts book Misophonia.

On February 12, 2019, the singer released a book of poetry and photography titled Separate the Dawn, through Federal Prisoner. The book was done during the Dillinger Escape Plan's last tour and its release date marked the second anniversary of their accident in Poland, where a car collided with the band's tour bus near the town of Radomsko. The members were not seriously hurt, but they "narrowly survived"; the incident had a major psychological impact on Puciato. The initial 1000 hardcover copies of Separate the Dawn were followed by a second pressing of 200, each selling out within four days.

On December 6 and 7, 2019, Puciato, along with former Dillinger drummer Gil Sharone and film composer Tyler Bates, joined Jerry Cantrell of Alice in Chains for two full shows of Alice In Chains songs and Jerry Cantrell solo material. The sold-out concerts were Cantrell's first solo concerts since 2004. That line-up, along with bassist George Adrian, would go on to tour North America and Europe with Cantrell throughout the Spring and Summer of 2022. Puciato would continue on with Cantrell, and a different line-up, until late 2025.

In 2022 he appeared on “Imaginary Fire” off of Carpenter Brut’s Leather Terror album, and in 2025 he appeared on the Ho99o9 album Tomorrow We Escape, joining them for a track called “Tapeworm”.

== Artistry ==
=== Vocals and musical style ===
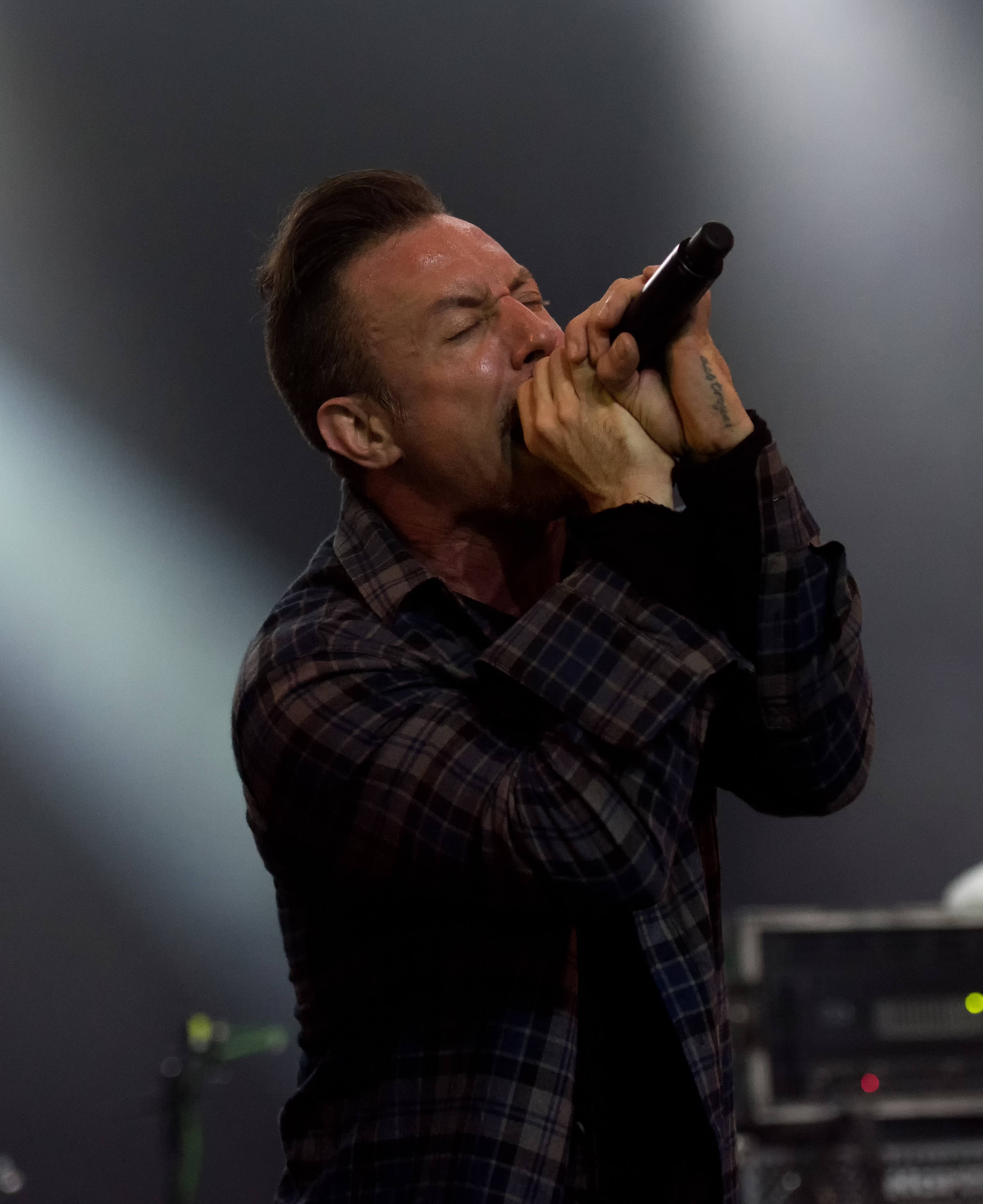
Puciato performing at Wacken Open Air 2017

According to The Range Place, Puciato has a Verdi baritone voice type and, as of August 2016, his recorded vocal range spans from A1 to C6, reaching 4 octaves, 3 notes. In addition to his range, reviewers have highlighted his versatility, which may encompass diverse styles in a single song, and unusual harmonization; both characteristics display features more akin to other genres than to heavy metal. His techniques cover crooning, screaming and, as stated by Ultimate Guitar, "so many different noises and sounds that don't even present themselves as human", comparing him with a "computer". The Dillinger Escape Plan music tended to demand heavier vocal timbres from Puciato, but PopMatters remarked that his "singing voice was so powerful, it came as a shock to startle ear drums when present." Others have described it as "rubbery-yet-vulnerable", possessing an "adenoidal quality" and often employing a "come-hither falsetto". Regarding his harsh vocals, journalist Calum McMillan singles out the rare "variation in tone and control" he attains, while MetalSucks calls it "surprisingly-well-enunciated" and "unmistakable ... to just blend in with metal's interchangeable screamers". Chris Corfield at Dawsons.co.uk considers Puciato one of the best examples of a singer who masters all heavy metal's various vocal styles.

Although primarily known as a singer, Puciato started out as a guitarist and still plays it today. He is also a film score and video game music fan, and, as of 2005, Puciato had created several programmed pieces and instrumentals with his bandmate Chris Pennie, and until 2008 with musician John LaMacchia, but since then he has focused on his traditional writing ability.

=== Influences ===
Regarding his influences, Puciato stated, "everything I've ever liked I sort of make a mental impression of. A song or soundtrack or moment from a movie, or the way an entire movie feels, or simply the way an actor feels, the way a writer feels." He describes them as cumulative and not always musical, trying "to find a way [of expressing them] through me vocally." When he was a child, the performance of singers Mike Patton in The Real Thing, Les Claypool in Frizzle Fry, H.R. in I Against I, and Chuck Mosley in We Care a Lot deeply influenced him. He would later cite Faith No More's Mike Patton and Bad Brains's H.R. as his biggest inspirations when growing up, who "opened my eyes a lot to what could be done with the voice overtop of heavy music." Furthermore, R&B singer Maxwell was a major influence on Puciato's falsetto, and Death's Chuck Schuldiner, especially his album Symbolic, on his death growl technique.

Other prominent influences include Loveless by My Bloody Valentine; soul and R&B vocalists Seal, Russell Thompkins Jr., Sade, 1998 album Embrya by Maxwell, Rick James song "Fire and Desire", and Carl Anderson's "Heaven on Their Minds" from Jesus Christ Superstar; Mazzy Star frontwoman Hope Sandoval; and film director Stanley Kubrick.

The main influences on Puciato's guitar playing were thrash metal and shredding.

=== Vocal development ===
Puciato claims that from age two he remembered the cadence of different actors from films and could mimic some, distinguished different instruments in a song, and also remembered the rhythms of things like washers, dryers and turn signals, in addition to manifesting signs of hyperlexia. He "couldn't get enough of words or sounds" and he believes that those traits, along with his ADD, predisposed his inclination to music and performance.

Puciato is a self-taught musician and, starting as a teen, he recorded himself on an eight-track recorder for many years, analyzing his vocal performances, trying to improve them and integrate the styles of singers he admired into his own, as well as practiced scales and exercises.

In 2008, he called himself an "idiot" for no longer taking proper care of his voice while touring with the Dillinger Escape Plan and, as of 2013, his only training was singing other people's songs in increasing pitches. This was due to the band's hectic touring schedule, with Puciato never missing a show, and their aim to self-manage: the singer was entirely in charge of choosing their garments and mail orders between tours until the early 2010s, which left him time to solely focus on songwriting. After the Dillinger Escape Plan broke up, Puciato considered himself "lucky" to only have suffered temporary damage in his vocal cords throughout their career.

=== Writing and recording ===
More important than anything identifiable musically, is emotional honesty and vulnerability. That's the thing that gets lost when people are more concerned with technique and proficiency than self-exploration. That's what I'm the most proud of ...

— Puciato on his songwriting process, 2016

Puciato follows the same approach in writing for the Black Queen, characterized by moody synths and electronics, and the Dillinger Escape Plan, featuring dissonant, complex rhythms and abrupt changes, despite the stylistic disparity of both bands. Detailing his vocal composition and recording processes, Puciato stated, "I don't leave anything out of the realm of possibility when it comes to vocal style, as far as getting what I want. I'm more interested in capturing or amplifying the emotion of the song". He tends to seek the "big picture" of his pieces under development instead of going through them detail by detail; the latter is a common procedure used by some of his musical partners and Puciato believes that both methods balance out the "flipside of their [respective] strengths". Before composing many songs, he usually listens to their instrumentals hundreds of times, in different environments, immersing himself in their structures until a "breakthrough" happens, usually involving a short verse, and then his writing naturally progresses.

Puciato writes poems and prose independently of his music, and all of them are to varying degrees autobiographical, putting as much emphasis on the patterns and melodies of the songs as on their lyrics, and discarding those which "mean nothing" to him. Typically employing various figures of speech, PopMatters described Puciato as a "brilliant storyteller, always bringing the listener into the atmosphere of the song", and his lines "wash over you like an emotion — maybe you can't pinpoint its exact meaning or origin, but you know it's there", opined MetalSucks. Coincidentally, Puciato said that the context of his lyrics may be only understood by his closest friends, but he tries to "give their [emotional] source to the listener without it becoming too indecipherable or compromised along the way [of creating the music]." In his first years with the Dillinger Escape Plan, he oftentimes drew verses from his personal writing to make a song, focusing on phrasings and phonemes that fitted the songs' rhythms or moods instead of their literal meanings. However, he has since stopped "dissecting [his poems] and then trying to squeeze them into thoughts", choosing instead to create a distinct narrative for each of them.

Puciato normally records vocals as soon as he pens lyrics in order to crystallize the emotional significance which, in that period, the words had for him. In this context, he once described himself as a "self-abusive perfectionist" because of his proclivity for repeating vocal takes numerous times, to the point of exhaustion, until he was either stopped by his companions or physically unable to continue.

Concerning his choruses and use of melodies, Puciato states that most of his favorites come to his mind without much labor, describing the intersections of good melodies and meaningful lyrics as if they came "from the ether ... as hippie as that may sound."

=== Live performances ===
Puciato seemed fearless and indestructible, routinely climbing up PA stacks and diving off two floors of upper balconies. ... He was physically looming and cut, bulletproof and cool, with the brooding intensity of Henry Rollins cloned three times. While he was certainly admired for following his ID, Puciato more often than not terrified some fans who were simply too frightened to meet him.

— Alternative Press on Puciato's stage performances with Dillinger, 2019

Stage performances by Puciato, particularly as a member of the Dillinger Escape Plan, were noted for their reckless, chaotic nature. The band was already known for its shows, but the addition of the singer in 2001 led to their most infamous performances. Commenting on his athletic physique and destructive antics, Invisible Oranges stated, "There have been plenty of imposing physiques in heavy music, but few have weaponized their body the way that Puciato has. ... He treats his body like a battering ram, using it to crash against walls of other humans." The site went on to say that "Puciato is the perfect physical embodiment of the Dillinger Escape Plan's music. [Ben] Weinman smashes his guitar. Puciato smashes himself." The concerts caused him both cumulative and direct injuries, and a news site commented in 2013: "Thankfully, Mr. Puciato has not, as of this writing, actually killed himself while [performing]".

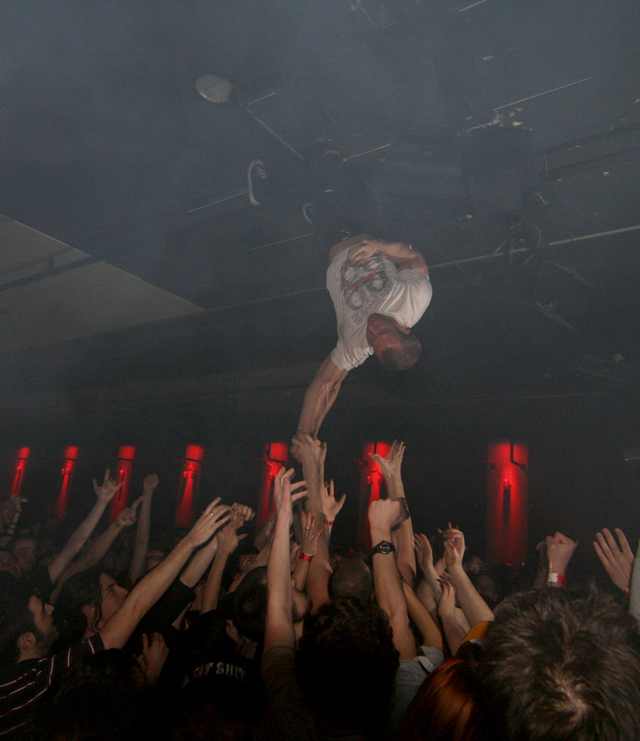
Puciato singing while hanging head down from a ceiling

During his first years with the band, Puciato kept blowing fire, in the same way as his predecessor Dimitri Minakakis, and started to light their drums on fire, to run rapidly from the stage onto the heads of the crowd, or to climb through them, as well as invited the audiences to the stage. Despite claiming to be afraid of heights, hallmarks of his shows included climbing balconies, PA systems or lighting rigs, to then jump off some of them. In the beginning he and his bandmates often smashed their gear, threw it to the crowd, and destroyed the venues' equipment at which they played. In 2005, the singer said that, during their first years, conflicts with security guards were common for him because one of them was either "being an asshole to a kid" or accidentally hit by a piece of equipment thrown from the stage. These stunts continuously led the Dillinger Escape Plan to be banned-and reinstated-by venues.

When asked about his rehearsal schedule, Puciato said that the performances are "completely improvised. I just want to be as pure and in the moment as possible vocally and physically... to me it's about trying to transcend and reach the purest part of the moment and live in that completely for the whole performance." Puciato later resented that several fans were "frightened" of him due to their perception of him.

Following the disbandment of the Dillinger Escape Plan in December 2017, Puciato started intensive cardio routines in order to, among other things, avoid experiencing "chemical tour withdrawal" due to "expel[ling] a small nuclear reactor's worth of energy ... [after] 17 years [of being] nearly every night on tour".

==== Live incidents ====
On his first live show with Dillinger, a heckler who asked for Minakakis was hit with a monitor thrown from the stage. A few shows afterward, Puciato's face was hit by a guitar, shattering a tooth and requiring emergency dentistry. During a 2002 show supporting System of a Down in Europe, audience members taunted the band and hurled chicken at them, which the singer picked up and ate. At their June 22, 2002 performance at Krazy Fest 5 at Louisville Waterfront Park in Louisville, Kentucky, Puciato set their guitar cabinets on fire, threw them into the Ohio River and leaped off into the water, unaware that the undertow could have pulled him deep beneath the surface and consequently drowned him.

At the 2002 edition of the Reading Festival in the United Kingdom, Puciato defecated onstage, put it into a bag, and threw it into the crowd before smearing the rest onto himself, proclaiming "This is a bag of shit, I just wanted to show you this so you'll recognize it later on throughout the day" referring to other bands that would appear that day of the festival, particularly Puddle of Mudd and Hoobastank. The act caused much controversy and had the Dillinger Escape Plan on the verge of being banned in the UK. Upon returning to Reading in 2016, Puciato played the opening song "Prancer" sitting on an onstage couch reading a newspaper and drinking tea.

On June 10, 2006, the Dillinger Escape Plan played in Fredericksburg, Virginia in front of a hostile audience and a spectator stole James Love's guitar, leading Puciato to chase him from the stage to the parking lot where the robber got into his car, ran over the singer's foot and a member of Cattle Decapitation tossed a hammer through his windshield, yet he managed to flee.

At the Los Angeles House of Blues, opening for Cavalera Conspiracy in 2008, Puciato jumped into the VIP section and threw a chair to a security guard who was "roughing up" a fan, giving rise to a near-riot, the audience beginning to throw objects and the other guards trying to drag the singer off the stage for the rest of their set. The event ended up with six police cars arriving at the place and, by 2011, Dillinger had been still barred from that chain of venues across the country. When they were reinstated to perform at House of Blues, headlining the 2013 Summer Slaughter Tour, the show was guarded by police but there were still two people knocked out in a mosh pit.

== Views on the music industry ==
I think if you have something you care about it's best to be as hands-on as possible with every aspect of it ... [Some people] say, "Ah I just don't give a fuck..." as if that apathy and nonchalance is something to be proud of. There are some things you shouldn't care about at all, but when it comes to what you are putting out into the world, you should give all of the fucks. ... [By doing this] you end up spending an eternity obsessing over every detail, on the creative end and the release end, which is all fine by me. We enjoy it.

— Puciato on self-managing most of the aspects of his bands, 2016

Fascinated with DIY culture and tape trading, Puciato has worked without the assistance of record labels or marketing professionals since the 2016 album Fever Daydream, and, since 2018, he has done so with visual artist Jesse Draxler on the two-man independent label Federal Prisoner, where they have performed or learned the different operations associated with releasing music by themselves. Puciato believes that it is essential for artists to keep a "personal connection to everything" related to their projects for as long as they can, including the non-musical aspects (merchandise, videos, audience interaction and operational tasks), as well as to avoid "the equivalent of a prolonged summer camp for as long as you can before you have to go into the real world." While critical of major labels, he said that they are "not [entirely] just a bunch of capitalists" and that among them still are people with "strong passion for growing artistic culture and individuality", and that, in the best case-scenario, they are capable of "nurturing you and supporting you", but he could no longer separate the creative process from the non-creative ones.

Since the Dillinger Escape Plan broke up in December 2017, Puciato has only released limited editions of his records and products, such as his book, as he had already done with the first Black Queen album. In line with this he has gone "down the rabbit hole" on creating different variants for each limited vinyl and cassette tape that he has made. This undertaking was partially a reaction to his experiences with some people in the music industry, whose major focuses were on the number of copies they sold or involving themselves in large labels or brands to gain prestige, objective which Puciato sees as tampering the creative authenticity of artists. In 2018, he elaborated:

[Some musicians are in] this imaginary cage of, "I gotta keep getting bigger! We need to do more than we did last time! We need to sell more!" No, you don't! That's madness! Are you trying to be Walmart? What's your point in making art? Is it to sell the most stuff? ... It's just a horrible thing to do to gauge your success purely on quantification, ... I'd rather make five hundred cool records that, when I see one of our fans coming up to me with that record, it bonds us in a way and I'm like, "Oh, man! You've got one of those? That's incredible! Because I was involved in every process of this and there's only five hundred of them and you're one of them. That's sick!" ... You want to give people something when you do something, everytime you release anything or say anything, otherwise you're just trying to draw attention or take their money.

Puciato's fixed interest in limitation was also inspired by his discovery and purchase of a 1987 first pressing of Soundgarden's debut release Screaming Life, which was limited to 500 copies and became a cherished record to Puciato after Chris Cornell's death, and the 8-track bootleg Live at Slim's by Melvins, that only had 100 copies. He has also avoided doing unnecessary advertisements or "constantly be forcing conversation" for his upcoming projects, and uses social media scantily in this aspect. For example, 2019's Separate the Dawn was announced just a month before the release date and without special events.

The singer is opposed to illegal downloading, especially concerning underground artists who struggle to maintain a career, and he emphasizes that the convenience of buying music through Internet has left "no excuse for bankrupting a scene or band you're into anymore." The 2010 Dillinger Escape Plan song "Good Neighbor" deals with this topic. On the other hand, he has also remarked that the timesaving benefits of using Internet are "incredibly valuable" and override its drawbacks as long as it is tapped into creatively by artists. As a consequence he has refused to launch crowdfunding campaigns, e.g. via Kickstarter or other platforms, for any of his projects, believing that doing so is creatively and morally "weak."

== Personal life, public perception and controversies ==
Puciato moved to Los Angeles, California around 2009. He cited his discomfort with the cold weather of the American East Coast as the main reason.

Puciato is a voracious reader and has taken several online courses at California State University, Long Beach amidst his career, including classes on psychology, sociology and economy. Besides songwriting, he writes poems and prose "all the time" and has a copious amount of texts unreleased. Journalist Andrew Parks at Self-titled considered it "unfortunate" that the singer's live presence and public remarks diverted these aspects of his personality away from Puciato's public image - a sentiment later echoed by the frontman.

The singer's athletic body has drawn the attention of media and fans. Puciato started working out at fifteen because he saw it as a healthy hobby besides music and "just kept going with ... [because] it kinda kept me out of a lot of trouble - I mean, I don't really drink or do drugs or anything like that. So it's like what else do you do?" In a 2010 interview with ESPN, Puciato revealed that he had considered becoming a professional bodybuilder, but ultimately changed his mind because of his dissatisfaction with that industry. By 2018, he had reduced his weightlifting sessions drastically and in turn shifted them into many forms of aerobic exercises, which was preceded by a reassessment of his motives behind training. That year, he claimed to be probably in the best condition of his life.

For the most part, Puciato has avoided addressing his personal and family relationships in order to respect their privacy. In 2012, it was reported that he was romantically linked to former pornographic actress Jenna Haze. After this surfaced, the singer expressed uneasiness yet thought that it was "somewhat unavoidable" due to their public profiles at the time. As of 2023, Puciato is dating Reba Meyers, of Code Orange fame.

From around 2011 to 2013, Puciato had many experiences with psychedelic drugs.

In 2013, the singer was diagnosed with attention deficit disorder and subsequently treated it. Puciato was relieved to have finally identified it because, until then, he did not understand several of his personal traits such as hyperfocus and a deficiency in short-term memory when performing music-related activities, as well as a distortion in time perception. He has dealt with anxiety, panic attacks, agoraphobia, depression and other mental health issues as well. In an extensive 2018 interview with Kerrang!, Puciato opened up about his inner struggles with the intention of helping people who are going through similar situations.

=== Incidents ===
Prior to recording 2007's Ire Works by the Dillinger Escape Plan, Puciato and bassist Liam Wilson set to break the world record for the Cannonball Run Challenge in the singer's car, from their homes in the Northeast Coast to their recording studio in California. On his first shift, Puciato drove twenty-two hours straight and received speeding tickets in three states worth hundreds of dollars. When they arrived and eventually finished the album, Puciato left his car there before returning to Baltimore and was later jailed amidst a Dillinger tour due to forgetting to pay a fine.

On July 23, 2010, Puciato's death was faked by bandmates Ben Weinman and Liam Wilson, when they posted on their Twitter accounts that the singer had passed in his sleep. Shortly after their Warped Tour set on that day, Every Time I Die vocalist Keith Buckley debunked the rumor, tweeting, "If Greg Puciato is dead, then his corpse just played a great set on mainstage today."

In January 2012, the singer ended up with the assistance of emergency units after ingesting hallucinogenic mushrooms mixed with other substances, which had caused what he described as "something in between a near-death experience and a near-out-of-body experience."

In early 2015, all of Puciato's personal belongings were stolen while he was relocating to a new place.

=== Statements and beliefs ===
In addition to his music and stage shows, Puciato is known for his outspokenness. Several of his statements on social media and interviews became headlines.

Puciato has expressed more affinity for the progressive-leaning ethics of punk and hardcore than those of heavy metal. He has been critical of both organized religion and mainstream politics, and of the relationship between the two, and has been consistently supportive of LGBT rights, criticizing homophobia in heavy metal subculture, releasing a shirt in support of LGBT rights with the Dillinger Escape Plan, and also debuting a video from the Black Queen on Out's magazine website.

In 2018, Puciato explained that he has a "really big gag reflex" for artists who are not genuine with their audiences or who compromise themselves to profit. He does not view the relationship between artists and fans as hierarchical, and in 2016 explained: "I mainly feel acutely aware of wanting to connect with people [through art], to reach from your innermost abstract being to theirs, a direct line, as a person and not a thing or a product, and to never treat people as below you just because they appreciate what you do or pay to see you." Especially during his tenure with the Dillinger Escape Plan, Puciato was outspoken on his opinions about other musicians, criticizing, among others, Puddle of Mudd, Fall Out Boy, and Jared Leto of Thirty Seconds to Mars, referring to the latter's transition from actor to rock musician as a "revolting shtick" and said that he "makes Fred Durst seem like Jim Morrison." His diatribes against Leto and Fall Out Boy came about after he discovered that they would headline festivals in which Slayer and the Melvins, and Judas Priest, respectively, would also play, describing those situations as "disgraceful."

In 2006, the members of the Dillinger Escape Plan and Avenged Sevenfold interchanged several insults and taunts, with the Dillinger page ending up parodying Avenged Sevenfold's use of stage names; its members' new names stood as G. Piranha (Puciato), Blaster Master Weinman (Ben Weinman), Bullwhip Benoit (Brian Benoit), Corpsefucker Pennie (Chris Pennie) and Leafeater Wilson (Liam Wilson). According to Puciato, he began making negative remarks about the band following the 2003 Take Action Tour, where Avenged Sevenfold supported the Dillinger Escape Plan, in which, as stated by him, their members took in provisions from Dillinger's catering table without asking them or introducing themselves.

In 2010, Puciato referred to Animals as Leaders as his "favorite instrumental metal band ever! ... [Their style is] refreshing. Usually virtuosity and boring go hand in hand, but this is a perfect marriage of soul-feeling with absurdly proficient guitar playing." Shortly after listening to them, he approached the band with the idea of a joint tour with Dillinger which came about in March of that year. He has called Prurient "one of the handful of people I've met who feel like true kindred spirits" and expressed "absolute respect" for Converge and their "artistic integrity." He also named Discordance Axis' The Inalienable Dreamless "probably my favorite grindcore album of all time", expressed admiration for Neurosis, The Köln Concert by Keith Jarrett, and the production work of the 1980s Janet Jackson albums.

In a 2013 interview, Puciato said that he does not "have a filter" on his statements, live performances and songs' lyrics, and in the past he thought that this "was a plus". He claims that this led his social media to become a "distraction" and distorted their original intention, which was to have a closer relationship with his fans. Eventually, he closed them all in late 2012, including Facebook, Twitter and Instagram. He returned to Instagram in 2021, opening a page with over 900 posts already on it, dating back to 2015.

== Accolades and praise ==
In the December 2007 issue of Revolver, Puciato was voted one of the "37 greatest metal frontmen" of all time. A 2009 list made by the head director and editors of Roadrunner Records included Puciato among the "50 Greatest Metal Frontmen of All Time" (excluding artists from Roadrunner). In 2013 he was named number one by MetalSucks in their listing of "top 25 modern metal frontmen". The site proclaimed: "[Puciato] is the personification of talent and anger and sadness and fuck-youness that draws people to metal and hardcore in the first place. There'll never be another just like him. He is the only one." In 2015, Uproxx ranked him at No. 17 on "The 20 Most Dynamic, Chaotic, Entertaining Frontmen and Frontwomen of All-Time". In 2018, Loudwire placed him 9th in their listing of the "Top 30 frontmen + frontwomen of the 21st century".

Several authors have named Puciato among the greatest harsh vocalists in hardcore punk and metal, one of the best contemporary vocalists in popular music, as well as one of the most versatile singers in rock.

The Bled frontman James Muñoz said that he "wanted to quit singing" after listening to Option Paralysis, "but that always happens when [he] listens to [the Dillinger Escape Plan] albums." Some musicians have also praised Puciato after collaborating with him: Max Cavalera from Sepultura said that their joint composition of Soulfly's "Rise of the Fallen" made it "one of the most exciting songs I've been part of in my career" and in 2017 went on to call Puciato "the best frontman of the last twenty years. Hands down." Upon hearing the vocals that Puciato recorded for his song "The Mighty Masturbator", Devin Townsend remarked: "Ladies and Gentlemen, Greg Puciato just tore me a new asshole. Fucking hell... AWESOME!"

== Discography ==
=== Solo ===
- Child Soldier: Creator of God (2020)
- Mirrorcell (2022)
- FC5N - EP (2024)

=== With the Dillinger Escape Plan ===
- Miss Machine (2004)
- Ire Works (2007)
- Option Paralysis (2010)
- One of Us Is the Killer (2013)
- Dissociation (2016)

=== With Spylacopa ===
- Spylacopa (2008)

=== With Killer Be Killed ===
- Killer Be Killed (2014)
- Reluctant Hero (2020)

=== With the Black Queen ===
- Fever Daydream (2016)
- Infinite Games (2018)

=== With Better Lovers ===
- God Made Me An Animal (2023, EP)
- Highly Irresponsible (2024, LP)

=== Guest work ===
Year	Artist	Release	Additional information	Source
2004	Error	Error	Vocals	
2008	Genghis Tron	Board Up the House	Vocals on "The Feast"	
2008	A Static Lullaby	Rattlesnake!	Vocals on "The Pledge"	
2009	Every Time I Die	New Junk Aesthetic	Vocals on "The Marvelous Slut"	
2010	Soulfly	Omen	Vocals on "Rise of the Fallen"	
2011	Architects	The Here and Now	Vocals on "Year in Year Out"	
2011	The Devin Townsend Project	Deconstruction	Vocals on "The Mighty Masturbator"	
2013	MixHell	Spaces	Vocals on "Exit Wound"	
2014	Suicide Silence	You Can't Stop Me	Vocals on "Monster Within"	
2015	Lamb of God	VII: Sturm und Drang	Vocals on "Torches"	
2020	Jesse Draxler	Reigning Cement	Vocals on "Everyone Dies and Nothing Goes on"	
2021	Jerry Cantrell	Brighten	Background Vocals	
2022	Carpenter Brut	Leather Terror	Vocals on "Imaginary Fire"	
2025	Ho99o9	Tomorrow We Escape	Vocals on "Tapeworm"	

=== Remixes ===
Year	Artist	Release	Additional information	Source
2009	Prong	Power of the Damn Mixxxer	Remixed "Bad Fall"	

== Bibliography ==
- Separate the Dawn (2019)
