= Party Smasher Inc. =

American independent record label

Party Smasher Inc. is an independent record label founded by Ben Weinman of the Dillinger Escape Plan in 2009. In May 2016, Party Smasher partnered with Cooking Vinyl for global distribution. The label is named after the Dillinger Escape Plan song of the same name on their 2007 album Ire Works.

== History ==
=== Formation (2009) ===
The Dillinger Escape Plan announced their departure from Relapse Records in 2009. The band had become dissatisfied with the music industry and music media, and decided to create their own record label to release their fourth studio album. Commenting on the dissolving "indie band culture", Weinman stated, "back in the day there were record labels that you trusted, loved and you bought everything on it and you discovered a lot of great new music because of it. You listen to every single song back to front a million times, it'd be worn out to death before you moved onto another record. You'd read everything in the booklet, you'd read all the lyrics, you'd read all the notes, you'd discover something new." Speaking to Kerrang! about the decision, he said: "The most important thing was to keep evolving and changing. We didn't want to be stuck in some long contract that won't be relevant in a few years time... Or possibly even tomorrow. So half out of necessity, half out of choice, we decided to do this ourselves. The hard part is figuring out whether you're sacrificing your creative side because you're so busy with the business. That's the challenge and we're figuring it out".

Party Smasher Inc. first emerged in 2009. Party Smasher launched as a recorded music collective. The Dillinger Escape Plan stated that Party Smasher (which was originally erroneously reported to be called Photogenic Records) is not technically a record label but a "creative umbrella" for all things related to The Dillinger Escape Plan. In an interview with Alternative Press, Weinman stated, "Well, I should clarify that it's not exactly our attempt to run a record label. That's not something we could be good at, and it's obviously not something anybody's good at these days. [Laughs] It's more a situation where we now have a name for this umbrella that covers every business and artistic decision we make–whether it's Dillinger, side projects or whatever."

=== Partnership with Cooking Vinyl (2010s) ===
In May 2016, Party Smasher partnered with Cooking Vinyl for global distribution. Martin Goldschmidt, Chairman of Cooking Vinyl, said: “Ben Weinman and his team at Party Smasher Inc. have evolved their own multi-faceted, unique creative universe. The world needs them and we will bring them to the world.” Howie Gabriel, from the newly launched Cooking Vinyl America, concluded: “We’re excited to have Party Smasher Inc.’s DIY ethic, along with Cooking Vinyl’s independent focus to bring both labels to a larger global audience.”

== Current artists ==
- The Dillinger Escape Plan
- thoughtcrimes
- No Machine
- Primitive Weapons
- Giraffe Tongue Orchestra
- Seven)Suns
- God Mother
- Actor / Observer

== Label discography ==
The first release through the Party Smasher label was the Dillinger Escape Plan's fourth studio album Option Paralysis, the album was released in partnership with Season of Mist. The second release was the Dillinger Escape Plan's fifth studio album One of Us Is The Killer, the album was released in partnership with various labels around the world, including BMG (Europe), Grind House (Japan), Remote Control (Australia) and Sumerian Records (North America). The third release was a non-album single the band released titled "Happiness Is a Smile". The single was only released on seven-inch vinyl and on cassette and was only available to buy on the band's North American tour in 2014. Party Smasher also released the band's final album, Dissociation in partnership with Cooking Vinyl.
