= College of Visual Arts =

Former art school in Saint Paul, Minnesota

Coordinates: 44°56′34″N 93°6′49″W

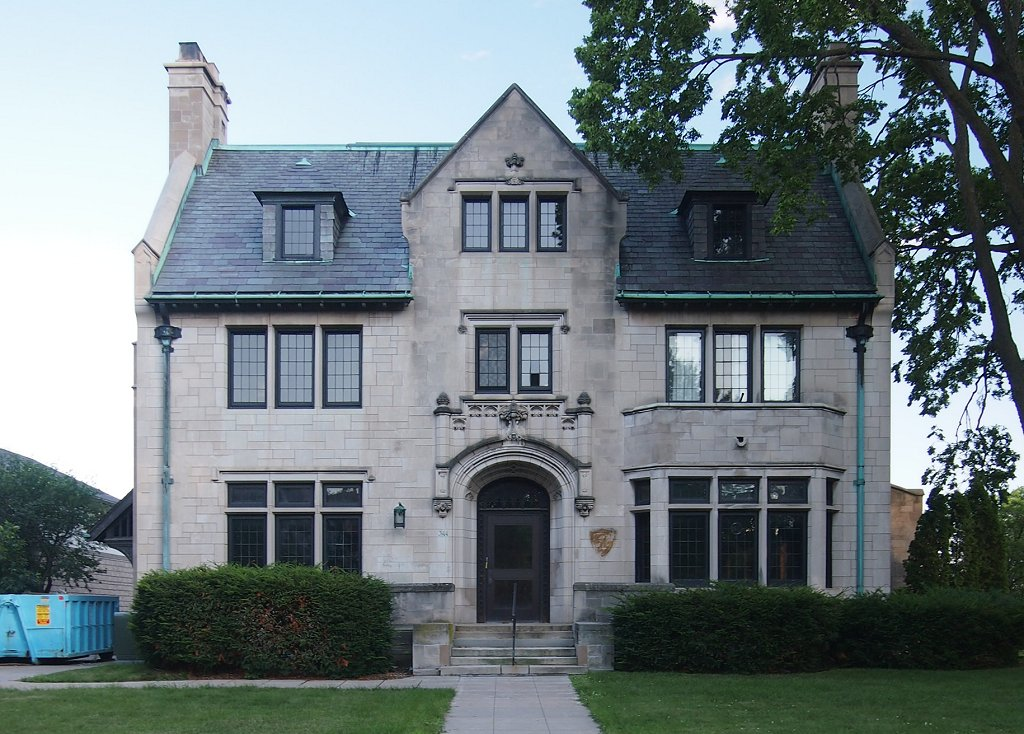
- The College of Visual Arts' former administrative building
- Other name: CVA
- Type: Private
- Active: 1924–2013
- President: Ann Ledy
- Faculty: 50
- Students: 200
- Location: 344 Summit Avenue, Saint Paul, Minnesota
- Campus: Urban
- Website: web.archive.org/web/20061205035019/http://cva.edu

The College of Visual Arts (CVA) in Saint Paul, Minnesota, United States, was a private, accredited, four-year college of art and design offering a Bachelor of Fine Arts degree in fine arts, graphic design, illustration, and photography. The fine arts degree offered concentrations in drawing, painting, printmaking, and sculpture.

CVA began as one of the first learning environments in the Twin Cities specifically designed to ignite the creativity of artists and designers. CVA was one of a handful of art and design colleges in the U.S. that provided an arts education steeped in the liberal arts. With an enrollment of approximately 200 students and a faculty of 50, CVA offered a low student-teacher ratio. The college was one of only two private art and design colleges in Minnesota. The college announced in January 2013 that its doors would be closing forever effective in June. President Ann Ledy resigned on January 23, 2013, and Dr. Susan Short served as Acting President until the college closed on June 30, 2013.

== History ==
In 1924 Lowell Bobleter acquired Mills College of Art and Advertising and transformed it into what would become the College of Visual Arts. Bobleter, a prominent Saint Paul artist and educator then serving as chairman of the fine arts department at Hamline University, based the new curriculum on the Bauhaus model: an integrated program including both fine and applied arts, and general courses in the humanities, natural sciences, and aesthetics. As president, Bobleter renamed the institution the School of Associated Arts (SAA). In 1969 the school assumed non-profit status. During the 1970s the school achieved national accreditation with the National Association of Trade and Technical Schools (NATTS) and began to participate in federal financial aid programs. In 1989 the college changed its name to the College of Associated Arts and began the process of seeking accreditation from the Higher Learning Commission of the North Central Association of Colleges and Schools (HLC). To clarify that the college was a four-year institution, the administration adopted the name "College of Visual Arts" (CVA) in 1995. CVA was granted candidacy status by HLC in August 1994, and was granted full accreditation in 1998. In October 2011, CVA also acquired accreditation by the National Association of Schools of Art and Design (NASAD). In January 2013, CVA announced that it would be closing its doors forever effective in June of that year.

== Campus ==
The campus was located in Saint Paul's historic Ramsey Hill and Summit Avenue neighborhoods and comprised five buildings: the 1915 Watson P. Davidson House on Summit Avenue (which housed administrative offices, classrooms, computer labs, and printmaking and sculpture studios); a public gallery at Selby and Western avenues; and three buildings near the gallery that housed the library, additional classrooms and studios, and a photography lab.

== Notable alumni and faculty ==
- Terry Redlin (1958)
- Michael Birawer (1993)
- Lynda Monick-Isenberg, Professor of Fine Arts and Foundation Studies Chair
- Valerie Jenkins, Associate Professor and Fine Arts Chair
- Jesse Draxler (2007)
- Jane Wunrow (2007)

== See also ==
- List of colleges and universities in Minnesota
- Higher education in Minnesota
