= Michael Birawer =

American artist

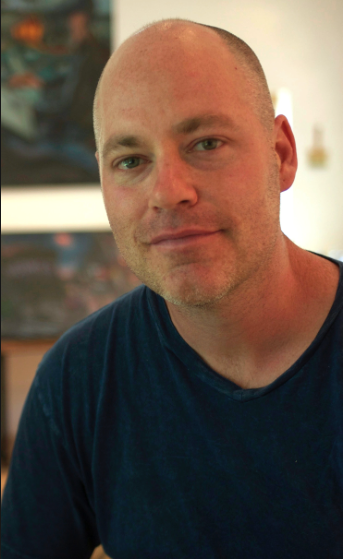
Michael Birawer

Michael Birawer (born April 17, 1971) is an American artist. Born and based in St. Paul, Minnesota, he is known for his surrealist paintings of urban settings and their inhabitants.

== Artwork ==
Birawer, a graduate of St. Paul's College of Visual Arts, began his career exhibiting his work at art fairs and local galleries. Today, you can see his works at his gallery located in the artist district of Northeast Minneapolis as well as numerous national galleries and retail outlets. His work combines oil and acrylic paints with layers of sculpted wood that he dubbed "pop outs."

Birawer first achieved major notice in 2001 with his series Scenes from the Twin Cities, which consisted of 20 local landmarks including the Hennepin Avenue Bridge, First Avenue, W.A. Frost and the Grandview Theater. In an interview, Birawer dubbed his style "cat art," citing his inspiration from the cartoonish rendering of felines with elongated features and excessively vibrant hues.

In 2003, Birawer was the winner of the year's poster contest to promote the St. Paul Art Crawl, a citywide celebration of the visual arts. His design "Chestnut and W. 7th" was used in the advertising and marketing of the event. In 2007, he was commissioned to create the official poster for the Minnesota State Fair.

In 2009, Birawer was commissioned to create the artwork "The Art of Parking" for Amano McGann's entry into the International Parking Institute Conference and Expo. The booth was recognized by the committee and earned the award as the best at the Expo.

Comedian and club owner, Rick Bronson, hired Birawer in early 2010 to create a massive 3-dimensional backdrop for Rick Bronson's House of Comedy at the Mall of America. The work measures 12 feet high, 32 feet wide and has a third dimension of 3 feet.

The Minnesota Twins commissioned Birawer in 2010 to create his interpretation of the team's new stadium, Target Field. The work, entitled, "Target Field - Home of the Twins", is on exhibit in the Minnesota Twins team offices at the ballpark.

In 2011 the Minnesota Orchestra commissioned Michael to capture Orchestra Hall before an extensive remodel. The artwork was used for all the promotional materials for the 2012 season.

Seafair summer festival in Seattle, Washington selected Birawer as the Official Artist to commemorate the 65th Anniversary of the event. The artwork, "Seafair - 65th Anniversary" is on exhibit at the Museum of Flight at King County International Airport, Boeing Field through the end of August, 2014.

Birawer created the commemorative artwork for the Museum of Flight 50th Anniversary in Seattle. The large artwork depicting many of the planes in the museum was auctioned off at the anniversary gala in August 2015.

The Minnesota Vikings commissioned Birawer in 2016 to create a large, 3-dimensional painting depicting the history of the team. The 12 foot by 28 foot mural hangs in the entry of the new Twin Cities Orthopedics Performance Center where the team trains in Eagan, Minnesota
