= The Black Queen (band) =

American electronic supergroup

- Origin: Los Angeles, California, U.S.
- Genre: Synthwave
- Years active: 2015–present
- Members: Greg Puciato; Joshua Eustis; Steven Alexander; Chris Pennie
- Website: theblackqueen.com

The Black Queen is an American electronic supergroup formed in Los Angeles in 2015. It was founded by lead singer Greg Puciato (of The Dillinger Escape Plan), keyboardists and guitarists Joshua Eustis (of Telefon Tel Aviv and ex-Nine Inch Nails) and Steven Alexander (former tech for The Dillinger Escape Plan and Nine Inch Nails).

The Black Queen self-released their debut album, Fever Daydream (2016). Following the announcement of their second album, Infinite Games (2018), came the formation of the label Federal Prisoner. Puciato elaborating in a blog post for Spotify that they would be "giving more than we would be gaining" by signing to an outside label, and that "everything I used to see as help, I suddenly saw as unnecessary at best, and a liability at worst."

== History ==
=== Formation and debut album (2013) ===
In January 2013, Greg Puciato revealed plans for a new project with Joshua Eustis in an interview with Revolver Magazine, later releasing a teaser video on their official homepage under the name The Black Queen in 2015. The following month, in April 2015, they released the music video for "The Still Point of My Turning World", directed by Mitch Massie.

=== Fever Daydream (2015–2016) ===
On June 14, 2015, the band revealed their single "The End Where We Start" on BBC Radio 1 Rock Show. Two days later, they released its accompanying music video on their official YouTube account, premiering it on the Rolling Stone website. The video was again directed by Mitch Massie. The band later randomly selected fans who had entered a contest via their homepage entering shipping address and subscribing to their mailing list in the process, and randomly distributed 33 limited edition copies of a tape labeled Fever Daydream Cassette MMXV free of charge to the contest winners. This cassette tape contained one song on each side, each of them running 33 minutes long.

Following this, 233 limited edition copies of The End Where We Start were made available for purchase on 12" vinyl, and sold only from the band's official website on July 9, 2015. The band did not promote this news on any social networking websites; only fans who had subscribed to their website's mailing list were notified with information about the vinyl sales. Since then, the band has continued to use their mailing list to update fans with their most current news and given notification of items for sale.

The music video for "Ice to Never (12" Extended Dance Mix)" was released on August 18, 2015. This video was directed by Rob Sheridan. The following month, 233 limited edition 12" vinyl copies of "Ice to Never" were made available for purchase on the band's homepage. The release contains the album version of the song, a shorter "single" version, and the extended version. The music video for "Ice to Never" was released in September 2015, again directed by Rob Sheridan, and premiering on Noisey. The video is shot on location in Los Angeles, largely in the skid row area, near where the band resided together during the creation of the album.

The music video for "Maybe We Should" was released December 1, 2015. The video is set around a club called Das Bunker in Los Angeles, and was filmed by Los Angeles-based fine artist Jesse Draxler and the band. Through their mailing list, the band announced schedules for concerts to be held on January 29, 2016 in Los Angeles, and February 5, 2016 in London. The same day, the band's debut album, Fever Daydream, became available for purchase through their official Bandcamp account, limited to 1000 copies on black vinyl and CD, as well as worldwide in independent record stores. It quickly sold out in all formats.

The music video for "Distanced" was released on December 30, 2015. The band also announced a further 250 copies of the album were to be made available for purchase on clear vinyl with alternate artwork by Jesse Draxler.

On July 21, 2016, the band released a video for "Secret Scream", this time choosing to premier it on the website of the LGBT publication Out Magazine. An accompanying EP was released, again with artwork from Jesse Draxler, and limited to 499 copies on vinyl. The EP contains an extended version of "Secret Scream", as well as the instrumental and an a cappella version of the song.

A final version of Fever Daydream, limited to 233 copies, was released on white vinyl, with yet another alternate cover. This cover is an inversion of the cover from the clear vinyl release. All physical versions of their recordings have become extremely rare and highly coveted on aftermarket sites such as Discogs.

=== Infinite Games (2017–present) ===
On June 15, 2018, the band announced that a new album called Infinite Games would be released on September 28, as well as the formation of a label named Federal Prisoner with Jesse Draxler. Puciato called the label "as much an act of refusal as it is a statement of intent", further elaborating in a blog post for Spotify that they would be "giving more than we would be gaining" by signing to an outside label, and that "everything I used to see as help, I suddenly saw as unnecessary at best, and a liability at worst."

Josh Eustis took a break from Touring in The Black Queen to focus on new material for Telefon Tel Aviv, But remains a full-time member of the band. Justin McGrath, formerly a gear tech for Nine Inch Nails, Puscifer, and A Perfect Circle, was recruited to fill in for him on tour.

== Band members ==
- Greg Puciato – lead vocals, guitars (2015–present)
- Joshua Eustis – keyboards, programming, guitars (2015–present)
- Steven Alexander – keyboards, guitars, programming (2015–present)
- Chris Pennie – drums (2015–present)

Touring members

- Justin McGrath – keyboards, guitars, programming (2019)
- Danny Lohner - guitars, keyboards, programming (2026–present)

== Discography ==
=== Albums ===
Title	Details	Peak chart positions	
Title	Details	US	AUS
Fever Daydream	Released: January 29, 2016; Label: Self released; Formats: CD, LP, digital download	— (Note: Fever Daydream did not enter the Billboard 200, but peaked at number 4 on the US Heatseekers Albums.)	—
Infinite Games	Released: September 28, 2018; Label: Federal Prisoner; Formats: CD, LP, digital download	— (Note: Infinite Games did not enter the Billboard 200, but peaked at number 8 on the US Heatseekers Albums.)	60

=== EPs ===
Title	EP details
BBC Session February 4, 2016	Released: February 21, 2016; Label: Self released; Format: Digital download

=== Singles ===
Title	Year
"Fever Daydream" (Note: "Fever Daydream" was released as a limited edition cassette tape under the title "Fever Daydream Cassette MMXV")	2015
"The End Where We Start"	2015
"Ice to Never"	2015
"Secret Scream"	2016
"Thrown Into the Dark"	2018

=== Music videos ===
- "The Still Point of My Turning World" (2015)
- "The End Where We Start" (2015)
- "Ice to Never (12" Extended Dance Mix)" (2015)
- "Ice to Never" (2015)
- "Maybe We Should" (2015)
- "Distanced" (2015)
- "Secret Scream" (2016)
- "Thrown into the Dark" (2018)
- "Your Move" (2018)
