= Full of Hell =

Full of Hell may refer to:

- Full of Hell (band), a grindcore band formed in 2009
- Full of Hell (album), a 2010 album by doom metal band Howl
- "Full of Hell", a song from the 1993 album Wolverine Blues by death metal band Entombed
