= Jesse Draxler =

American visual artist

Jesse Draxler is an American visual artist, illustrator and art director.

== Biography ==
Jesse Draxler grew up in a rural town in Wisconsin. His family had an automobile repair service and as a child he used to draw cars, trucks and engines for hours with friends. In first grade, Draxler discovered that he was color blind, being red-green color deficient. He studied at the College of Visual Arts in St. Paul, Minnesota. His thesis was on the commodification of subculture through the lens of punk rock, whose primary medium was collage. Draxler began making exhibitions in 2012.

On June 1, 2018, Draxler released the book Misophonia through Sacred Bones. The 100-page art book included a foreword written by musician Greg Puciato. On June 15, Draxler and Puciato co-founded the record label and art collective Federal Prisoner.

On September 27, 2018, Draxler premiered a short film at Davenport, Iowa with live score by Emma Ruth Rundle and Evan Patterson.

On September 4, 2020, Draxler released Reigning Cement, an audio-visual project consisting of a 100-page book of photographs and collages paired with a music album formed by audio assets given to thirty-four musicians, who could arrange them at their disposal but only adding vocals, mirroring the sonic equivalent of a collage. Both the visual and audio material was taken from the noisy industrial area outside of Draxler's studio, which is located on the outskirts of Los Angeles. On April 3, Draxler released its first single "Time reign cemenT", featuring Full of Hell vocalist Dylan Walker, alongside a music video premiered on Revolver. On June 12, it was released the second single and video for "Them", featuring electronic band Vowws, through Juxtapoz.

In December 2024, Jesse Draxler's work Pillar was featured in Christie's "First Open | Post-War and Contemporary Art" auction, an event showcasing works by prominent post-war and contemporary artists such as Andy Warhol, Jean-Michel Basquiat, and George Condo.

== Artistry ==
Jesse Draxler is a mixed media and multidisciplinary artist, and his pieces combine painting, photography, collage, typography and digital painting. Among their characteristics are distorting the human form, working in grayscale, and abstract landscapes. Writer Kyle Fitzpatrick described his portrayals as "a person mid-question ... Everything is abstracted just slightly, just enough to unnerve and entrance ... [It] feels as if his subjects are slowly focusing and refocusing, trying to become clearer", while artist Mike Carney said that it "is an authentic look into the transitional stasis of a technologically saturated existence, and the lapse of connection, far from bridged within its void."

Jesse Draxler's varied influences include heavy metal and electronic music, Zen literature, automotive machinery, background noise, and films. He says that much of his work "involves directly translating what I hear into what I see." He tends to write and journal extensively before working, believing that "the inception starts with thinking about it or processing an idea in my mind." Before relocating from Minneapolis to Los Angeles in January 2015, Draxler cut out all color and started to work solely in black and white. As a colorblind person, he described his transition as "natural" and felt that it opened up his artistic vision rather than limiting it.

Draxler's work has inspired music by Daniel Davies and Zola Jesus.

== Works ==
- Misophonia (2018)
- Reigning Cement (2020)
- The World is Mine & I'm Thinking About You (2023)
- U&I Exhibition Book (2024)
