= The Dillinger Escape Plan =

American mathcore band

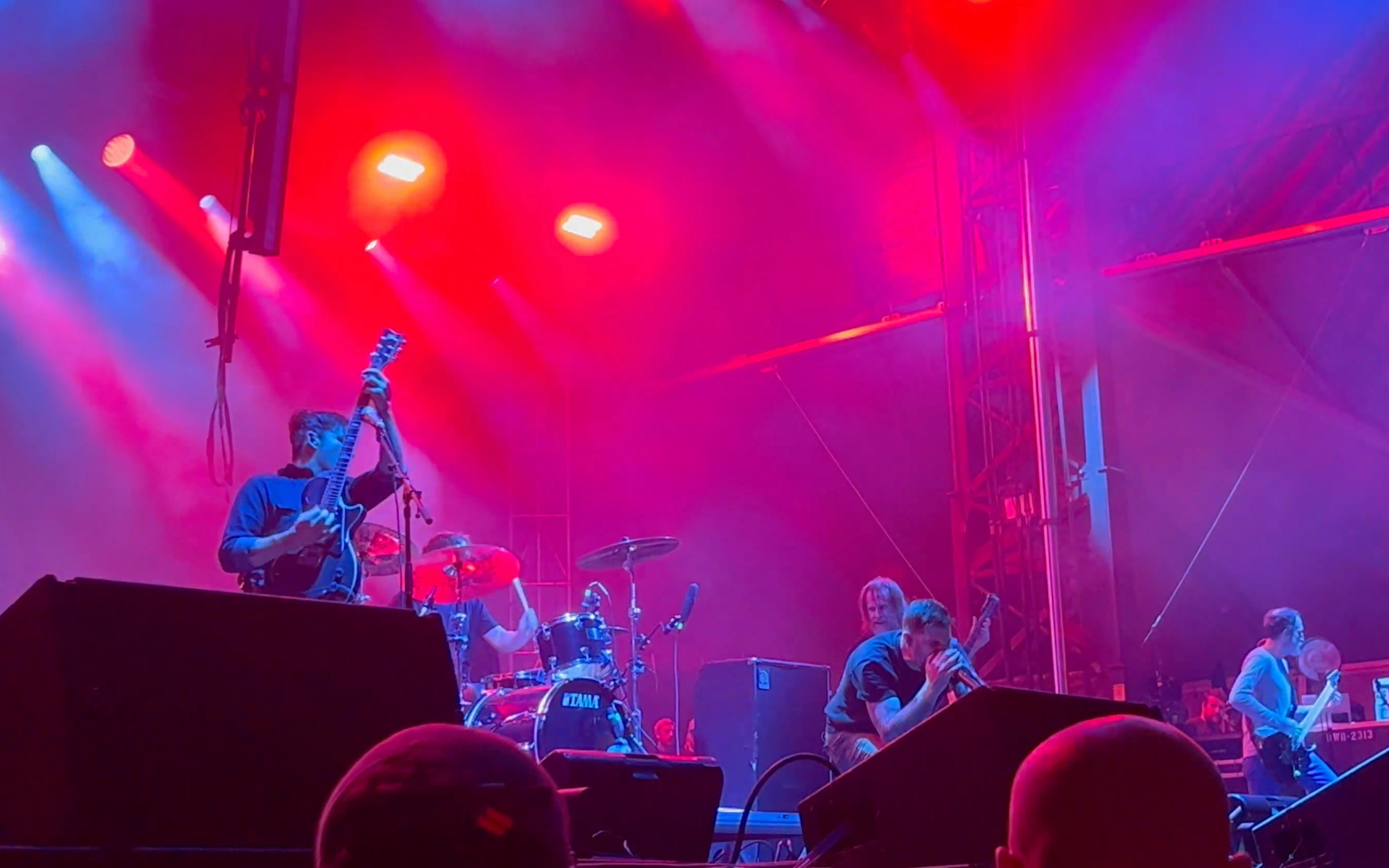
- The Dillinger Escape Plan at Furnace Fest 2025. From left to right: Ben Weinman, Billy Rymer behind, Dimitri Minakakis, Liam Wilson behind and James Love.

Background information
- Origin: Morris Plains, New Jersey, U.S.
- Genres: Mathcore; metalcore; experimental metal; progressive metal
- Years active: 1997–2017; 2023–2026
- Labels: Relapse; Party Smasher
- Spinoff of: Arcane
- Members: Liam Wilson; Ben Weinman; Billy Rymer; James Love; Dimitri Minakakis
- Past members: Chris Pennie; Adam Doll; Derrick Brantley; John Fulton; Brian Benoit; Jeff Wood; Greg Puciato; Gil Sharone; Jeff Tuttle; Kevin Antreassian
- Website: thedillingerescapeplan.com

The Dillinger Escape Plan was an American metalcore band from Morris Plains, New Jersey, formed in 1997. For much of their history, the band's lineup consisted of bassist Liam Wilson, lead vocalist Greg Puciato, guitarist Ben Weinman, and either Chris Pennie or Billy Rymer on drums. The band's use of dissonance, odd time signatures, polyrhythms and unconventional drum patterns became a staple of their sound, although later albums incorporated more melody and influences from a range of genres.

The band underwent several lineup changes, with Weinman remaining the band's only founding member. Original vocalist Dimitri Minakakis performed on their debut album Calculating Infinity (1999), which has been noted by critics as a landmark release in hardcore punk and heavy metal music. The album has achieved a cult status selling well over 100,000 copies, which made the band the highest-selling artist on Relapse at the time.

Puciato became the Dillinger Escape Plan's lead vocalist in 2001, and the band became known for their extreme live performances. Their fifth album, One of Us Is the Killer (2013), became the band's highest-charting in the U.S. at number 25. In 2016, the band announced their final album Dissociation, and their final shows took place at New York City's Terminal 5 in December 2017.

The Dillinger Escape Plan has won various nominations from award shows and publications such as the PLUG Independent Music Awards, Kerrang!, Revolver and Metal Hammer. In 2017, the band won an AIM Award for "Outstanding Contribution to Music".

From 2023 to 2026, the band reunited with Minakakis instead of Puciato to perform their early work in celebration of Calculating Infinity's 25th anniversary.

== History ==
=== Pre-Dillinger Escape Plan (1996) ===
The Dillinger Escape Plan evolved from the hardcore punk band Arcane. Arcane was an aggressive, political-oriented act formed in 1996 by guitarist Ben Weinman, drummer Chris Pennie, vocalists Dimitri Minakakis and Brad McMahon, and bassist Bruce Fulton. Arcane played for a few months but eventually disbanded because they "were kinda sick of trying to become part of a clique and to write music that would fit into a theme", according to Weinman. Encouraged by him, they turned around their sound and aesthetic, with bassist Adam Doll, who was Pennie's bandmate in the bands Samsara and Malfactor, becoming interested in their new direction and hence joining the band. Guitarist Derek Brantley also joined the band following the departure of McMahon and Fulton.

=== Early years and Calculating Infinity (1997–1999) ===
Their first live performance, which they also considered the last of Arcane, was as a support act for Overcast and organized by long time friend Matt Beckerman. Beckerman had just decided to form Now or Never records and asked the band to record what would be their self titled six-track EP. Their second show was supporting Earth Crisis @Sea Sea's in Moosic, Pennsylvania. They were nameless for many months until, without much thought, friend Matt Makowski suggested the name "The Dillinger Escape Plan" while watching a documentary on John Dillinger, a 1930s bank robber notorious for his multiple escapes from jail. Weinman telephoned Steve Evetts to produce their album because he was a big fan of his work. After their first two shows, Brantley lost contact with the band and did not show up when they were recording the six song self-titled effort, causing them to record as a quartet.

The six-track EP was released in April 1997, and set them off on a small club, DIY Basement and Rec Center tour around northeast America. Shortly before their first tour as The Dillinger Escape Plan, the group was joined by guitarist John Fulton, who previously played in the bands Samsara and Malfactor with Pennie and Doll. In 1998 the band wrote and recorded their second EP titled Under the Running Board. During this time period, The Dillinger Escape Plan gained notoriety in the hardcore punk scene for the intensity of their performances which were increasingly wild, and often violent. These features, as well as the creative, technical approach of their music led a record executive of Relapse Records to offer the band a multi-record contract. Shortly before signing, the Under the Running Board demo was shown to some friends, one of whom was Jesuit vocalist and guitarist Nate Newton who was impressed with their musical proficiency and invited The Dillinger Escape Plan to an American and Canadian tour with them and Botch.

Shortly after their second EP, John Fulton left the band to focus on his computer programming studies. Before the recording of Calculating Infinity, bassist Adam Doll was involved in a car accident that left him paralyzed from the chest down. The accident was a minor fender bender, but because Doll had leaned over to pick up a CD beneath the stereo, the accident caused a small fracture in his spine, inducing paralysis. Guitarist Weinman played both guitar and bass on the album, though liner notes credited Doll as providing a great deal of help. Calculating Infinity was released on September 28, 1999, through Relapse and was met with critical acclaim. Faith No More vocalist Mike Patton, one of the first people to hear the album, asked the Dillinger Escape Plan to tour for two months with his band Mr. Bungle. Shortly before touring began for the new album, former Jesuit guitarist Brian Benoit auditioned for the band, taking the place of the departed Fulton in November 1998 and Jeff Wood, former M.O.D. bassist and a childhood friend of Weinman, took the place of the injured bassist Doll.

=== Search for a new vocalist and Irony Is a Dead Scene (2000–2002) ===
After several months of touring, including appearances on the Warped Tour and March Metal Meltdown, the band and Wood parted ways, with Wood moving on to his own project, Shat, and Liam Wilson took his place. Later that same year, the band parted ways with Minakakis. Minakakis credited his departure from the band to the rigorous touring schedule. Without a vocalist, The Dillinger Escape Plan began a nationwide search for a replacement via their website, releasing an instrumental version of "43% Burnt" from Calculating Infinity and inviting prospective vocalists to record and send their own vocal tracks. They received many submissions, including one with rapping and one with death growls. While the search was underway, the band had already composed some songs and decided to record an instrumental EP, eventually asking Mike Patton to sing on it. In the meantime, they played some shows as an instrumental act and invited vocalist Sean Ingram of Coalesce to join them for their performance at Krazy Fest 4 on July 28, 2001.

In late 2001, Dillinger Escape Plan met Greg Puciato, one of the people who submitted a recording to the band. Puciato included two versions of "43% Burnt"; one with the band's provided lyrics, and one with original lyrics written by him. The band offered him the job after two practice sessions. He accepted, first appearing at the CMJ Music Festival in New York City in October. Soon after, Puciato and the band covered "Damaged I" and "Damaged II" by Black Flag for the tribute compilation Black on Black.

The plan to record with Patton was in place before a replacement vocalist had been found, but by the time Patton had recorded vocals and the EP was released, the band had been touring with Puciato for nearly a year. Epitaph Records offered to release the album and, although the band was doubtful at first, they finally accepted due to the label's enthusiasm. The EP titled Irony Is a Dead Scene was released on August 27, 2002. The EP features Weinman, Pennie, Benoit, Wilson, Patton on vocals, and ex-bassist Adam Doll assisting with keyboards and sample effects.

=== Miss Machine (2003–2005) ===
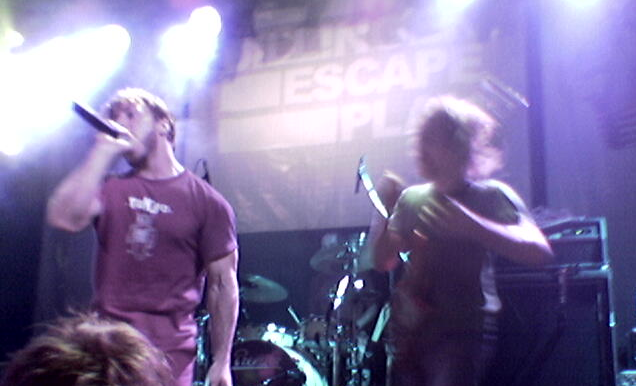
The Dillinger Escape Plan performing in Eindhoven, 2005

In 2003, the band appeared on the soundtrack for Underworld with the song "Baby's First Coffin", their first original song with Puciato on vocals. The band's second studio album (their first album with Puciato), Miss Machine was released on July 20, 2004, through Relapse. The album polarized The Dillinger Escape Plan audience; some fans were critical of the band's increasing artistic and musical departures from their earlier efforts, while others preferred them.

Following the release, The Dillinger Escape Plan began a two-year touring cycle, headlining tours of their own or occasionally providing support for acts such as Slipknot, System of a Down, and Megadeth. These tours were replete with injuries; in late 2004, guitarist Benoit suffered nerve damage (brachial plexus neuritis) in his left hand, and other than a short return to the stage in 2005, he has not played with the band since. Former Fenix*TX guitarist James Love ended up playing most shows in the late 2004–2006 period. In 2005, the band was forced to drop out of Dave Mustaine's "Gigantour" slightly early due to a rotator cuff injury and fractured vertebrae Weinman had sustained performing in Anaheim, California at all-ages venue Chain Reaction.

=== Ire Works (2006–2008) ===
In 2006, Weinman finally underwent surgery for his shoulder but chose not to treat his neck because of the risks involved. In June 2006, the band released both the digital EP Plagiarism, a cover album, and Miss Machine: The DVD, which featured live footage of its world tour. Simultaneously, The Dillinger Escape Plan opened for AFI on tour after being invited by vocalist Davey Havok. Shortly thereafter, the band toured with label mates Dysrhythmia and later with progressive rock band Coheed and Cambria. Four shows before the end of the Coheed tour, Weinman flew home for "undisclosed personal reasons", which were later revealed to be compounding medical and financial problems, as well as frictions with Pennie. The group played four dates as a four-piece. In a 2008 interview, Greg Puciato said that the relationship between Weinman and Pennie had been acrimonious for several years, involving heated arguments, and the other members had already foreseen a dissolution.

While resting his arm, the guitarist stated he began to compose and experiment with sound design and electronics for the upcoming album. During the time he was apart, Chris Pennie received a call from Coheed and Cambria guitarist Travis Stever who offered him to join the band when their former drummer, Josh Eppard, left them. Pennie left The Dillinger Escape Plan amidst writing Ire Works in 2007. In a 2017 interview, the drummer pointed out two defining incidents for his departure: before releasing Miss Machine, a member of the band turned down a tour slot with a "really big" band without clearing it with the other members, straining his relationship with Weinman, and legal issues of the guitarist in 2006 which put the band on hold. Other reasons were his priorities in composing and studying music over touring and contractual commitments. According to The Dillinger Escape Plan members and Relapse Records's Matt Jacobson, Pennie did not inform them until late, despite contractual obligations for the new Dillinger album. While Pennie did not drum on Ire Works, his contract prevented him from drumming on 2007 Coheed and Cambria album Good Apollo, I'm Burning Star IV, Volume Two: No World for Tomorrow, which was instead handled by Taylor Hawkins.

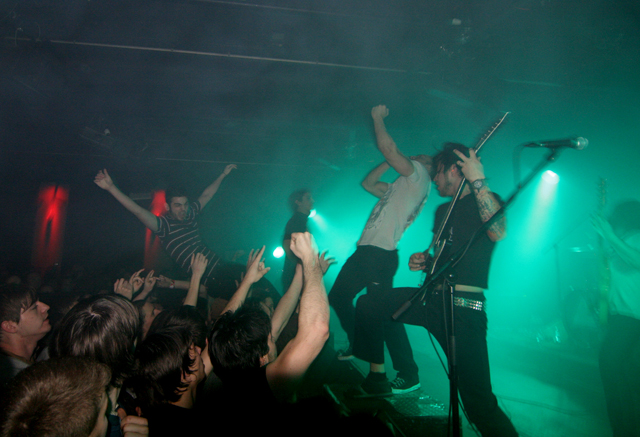
The Dillinger Escape Plan performing in Budapest in 2008

Weinman started to program drums daily for two months out of desperation. On June 15, the band announced the title of the album as well as confirming the departure of Pennie. Among the drummers considered to handle drum duties were Morgan Ågren and Sean Reinert, but the band decided to choose the relatively unknown Gil Sharone of Stolen Babies by the suggestion of Chris Hornbrook. Eventually, The Dillinger Escape Plan completed their follow-up album to Miss Machine in 2004, titled Ire Works. Ire Works was released on November 13, 2007, through Relapse. Despite the inner turmoil, when the record was finished the band was more satisfied with it than with any of the previous ones, calling it a "turning point".

The album debuted on the Billboard 200 at number 142 with 7,000 copies scanned, but was later corrected when it was revealed that Relapse did not account for album pre-release sales, increasing the number of total copies sold to 11,000. Ire Works had been a critical and commercial success, with the album being on many critics' top ten lists, making it the band's most critically successful album. Jason Lymangrover of AllMusic stated that "[if] DEP aren't careful and continue down this innovative path, they could easily be labeled the Radiohead of metalcore." Despite critical acclaim, members expressed concern over finances, with Puciato claiming the band had "no safety net" and Weinman having to move back in with his parents.

On February 6, 2008, the band had two songs from Ire Works broadcast on two television programs in the United States. The song "Milk Lizard" was featured on the CSI: NY episode "Playing With Matches", and the band performed live the song "Black Bubblegum" on Late Night with Conan O'Brien. Missing from the new line up was Benoit, who had left the band because of injury. Although assured his place in the band is secure should he ever be able to perform again, Jeff Tuttle formerly of Heads Will Roll and Capture the Flag took his place on stage. Tuttle, however, does not make an appearance on the record.

=== Party Smasher Inc. and Option Paralysis (2009–2011) ===
In January 2009, Sharone left the band and was replaced by Billy Rymer. The Dillinger Escape Plan played in Australia, where they joined Nine Inch Nails onstage during the Soundwave 2009 festival, helping them perform the songs "Wish" and "Mr. Self Destruct" as part of the last encore song of Nine Inch Nails' live show at the event.

The Dillinger Escape Plan announced their departure from Relapse Records on May 27, 2009. The band had become dissatisfied with the music industry and music media, and Weinman decided to create the independent record label Party Smasher Inc. to release their fourth studio album.

Since June 2009, they began to release several demo snippets on their YouTube channel of songs from their upcoming album. Furthermore, a website for the record was set up, linking to all of the studio update videos and demo snippets. During their North American East Coast tour with Thursday in December 2009, the band sold download cards at their shows that entitled the customer to a download of the 10 song album upon its release with 3 additional exclusive bonus tracks. The song "Farewell, Mona Lisa", debuted on Liquid Metal SXM on Christmas Day, 2009; it became available for download on January 19, 2010. "Chinese Whispers" was debuted on Full Metal Jackie's syndicated radio show broadcast on 29 stations throughout the USA on the March 5, 2010, and was subsequently played on the next two days. On March 9, the blog MetalSucks featured the online debut of the song. The band released their fourth studio album, Option Paralysis on March 22, 2010, through Party Smasher in partnership with Season of Mist Option Paralysis was confirmed as the title of the new album in a press release by Season of Mist. Puciato has noted that Option Paralysis was the toughest album the group and himself have ever written. In an interview in The Aquarian Weekly, Weinman stated that it was the most organic and less forced than previous works.

The Dillinger Escape Plan started the Option Paralysis touring cycle with a short North American tour with Thursday in December 2009, followed by a headlining run in Feb/March 2010 with Darkest Hour, Animals as Leaders, and Iwrestledabearonce. While on the tour, the band received a Golden God Award from Revolver magazine, for "Best Underground Band", which Weinman and Puciato accepted. After a short trip to Europe, they participated in Warped Tour 2010, playing June 24 through August 15. During a January 12, 2011 interview on the Metal Injection Livecast, Puciato announced that the band was currently in the process of writing new music which would either surface as an EP later in the year or else a full-length album the following year. However, in 2011 The Dillinger Escape Plan continued to tour, accompanying Deftones for a nine-week-long North American trek from April to June. Touring continued with former labelmates Mastodon, both in the US in late 2011 and the UK in early 2012, followed by their second appearance at Soundwave Festival in Australia, as well as dates with System of a Down in New Zealand and Australia. The group also played its first shows in Malaysia and Bangkok, as well as their first South American performance, headlining the second stage on the first night of the prestigious Rock al Parque festival in Bogota, Colombia.

=== One of Us Is the Killer (2012–2014) ===
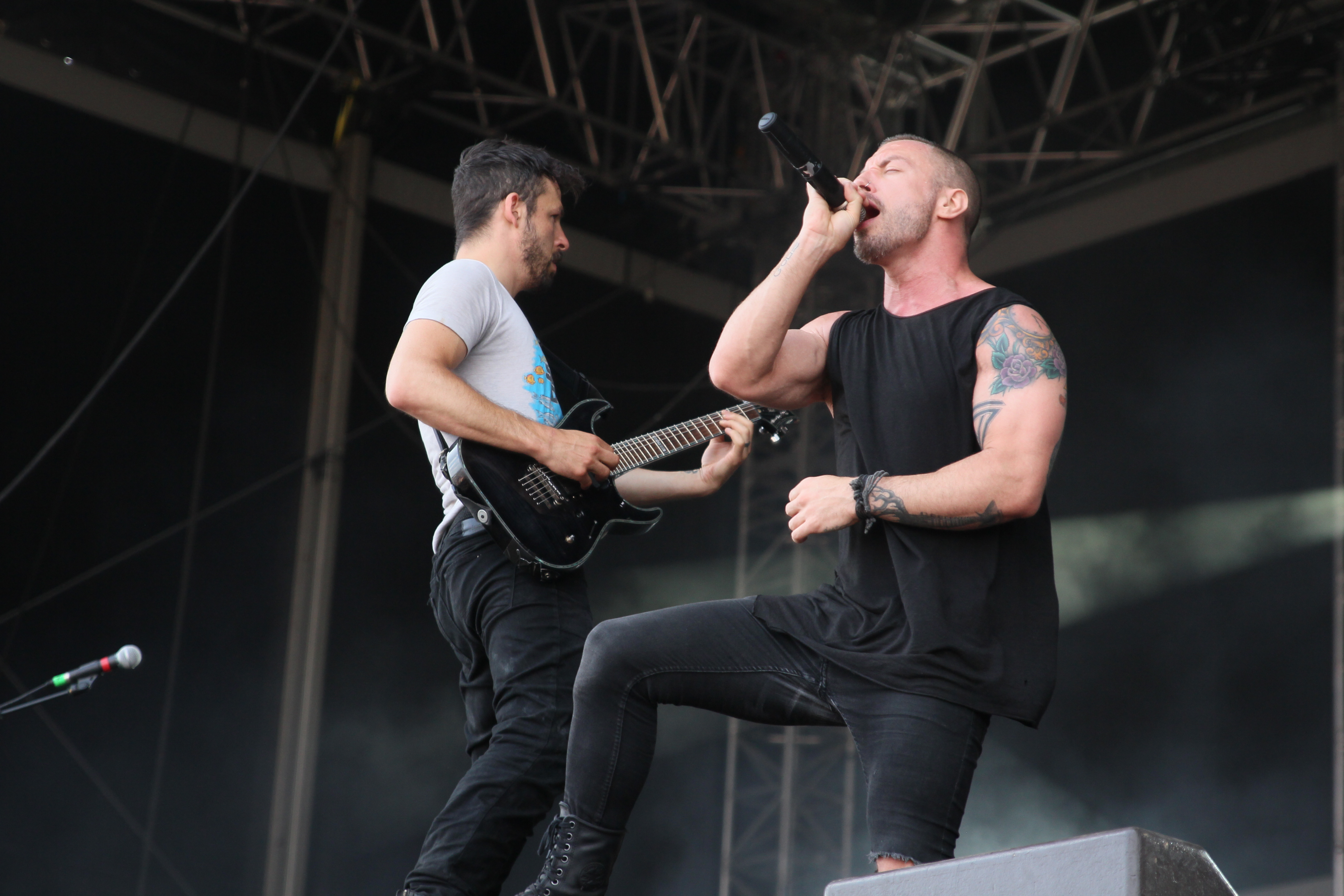
The Dillinger Escape Plan at the With Full Force festival, 2014

On August 17, 2012, the band announced via their Facebook page that Tuttle had left the band to pursue other projects in music and film. On November 24, the band played at the California Metalfest alongside bands such as Killswitch Engage and As I Lay Dying. While playing this show, a mystery guitar player was noticed filling in for former rhythm guitarist Jeff Tuttle, who had left the band in August. A couple of weeks later, during a phone interview (on the Metal Injection Livecast) while in the studio recording their new album, Weinman announced that this mystery guitar player was James Love, who had played with the band briefly while they toured in support for their album Miss Machine.

On February 18, 2013, the band announced the title of their new album, One of Us Is the Killer, On March 12, they released "Prancer", the first single from the album. On April 23, The Dillinger Escape Plan released the music video for "When I Lost My Bet", the first from the upcoming album. It was directed by Mitch Massie and was posted on the band's Facebook page and Sumerian Records' YouTube account. Subsequent videos released from the album were "One of Us Is the Killer", "Hero of the Soviet Union", and "Paranoia Shields". The band released their fifth studio album, One of Us Is the Killer on May 14, 2013, through Party Smasher in partnership with various labels around the world, including BMG for Europe, Grind House for Japan, Remote Control for Australia and Sumerian Records for North America.

While touring North American in April 2014, the band released the non-album single, "Happiness Is a Smile". The single was only released as a seven-inch vinyl and a cassette and was only available to buy on this tour. On July 14, 2014, it was announced that the band would be playing for two weeks as the opening slot on the Nine Inch Nails and Soundgarden North American tour. This decision was announced following the supposed disbandment of Death Grips, who was originally scheduled to appear as the opening act.

=== Dissociation and disbandment (2015–2017) ===
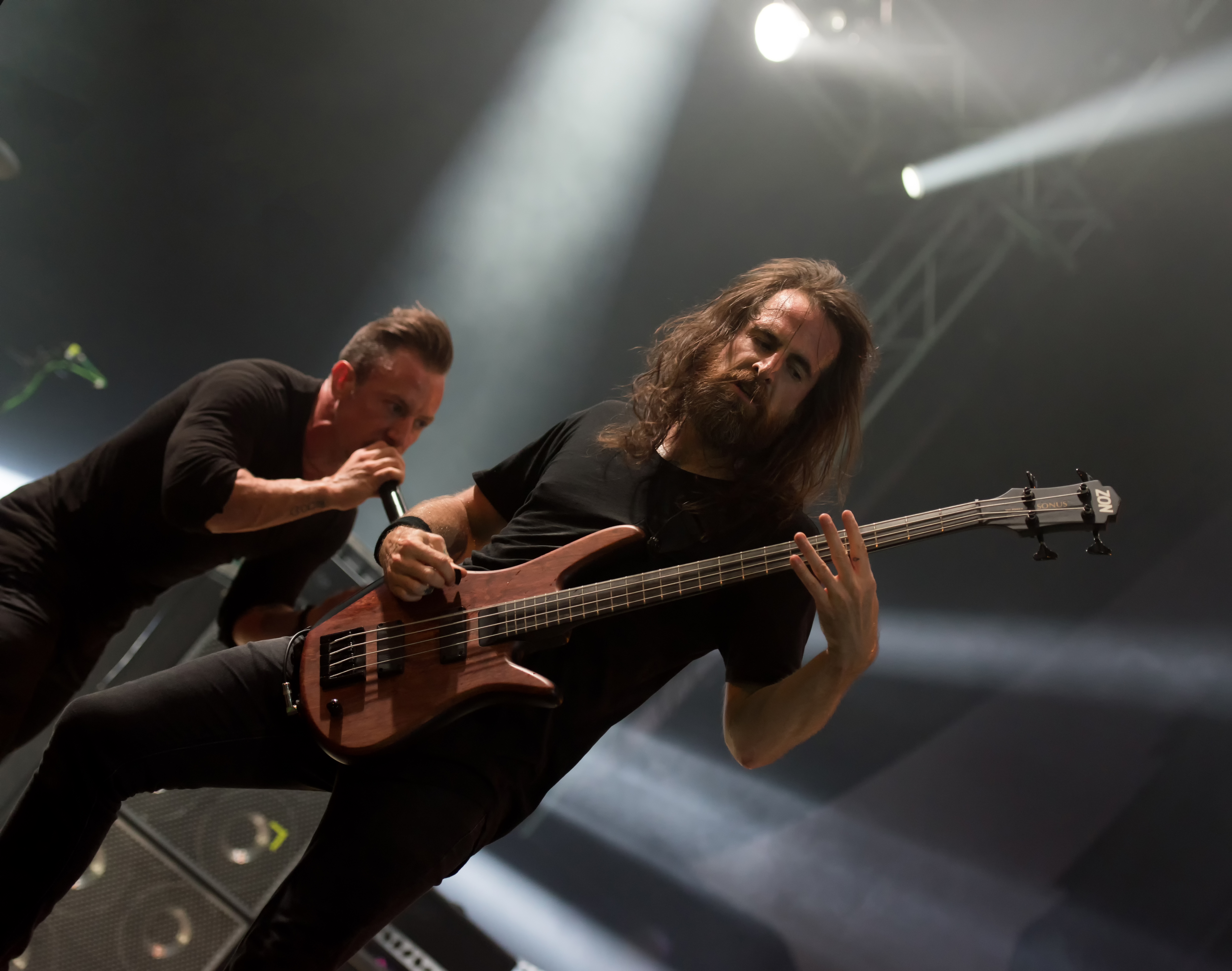
The Dillinger Escape Plan performing at Wacken Open Air 2017

In May 2015, Kevin Antreassian, a former member of New Jersey progressive metal band Knife the Glitter and former guitar student of Ben Weinman, became the new rhythm guitarist of the band replacing James Love. In July, Weinman announced during an Australian interview that the band would return to the studio in November to record the follow-up to One of Us Is the Killer. In the following year, BBC Radio 1 premiered the band's new single "Limerent Death", which would be featured on their sixth studio record Dissociation. In an interview with Noisey, Weinman said the Dillinger Escape Plan would stop performing, with Puciato later saying "we're breaking up". Puciato was quoted saying that the band still enjoyed writing, recording and performing together but "we started to reach what felt like a thematic conclusion to our band", comparing the decision to a filmmaker who enjoys the current film he is creating but cannot continue the process indefinitely. Weinman said, "we are going to do the cycle for this album and that's it." Dissociation was released on October 14, 2016, through Party Smasher in partnership with Cooking Vinyl. In 2019, the singer acknowledged this album the first part of a trilogy, followed by his 2019 book Separate the Dawn (written during their last tour) and finished with The Black Queen record Infinite Games.

On February 12, 2017, during their European farewell tour, The Dillinger Escape Plan was involved in a vehicle crash after a truck collided with their bus near Radomsko, Poland. The truck driver, who ended up seriously wounded, pleaded guilty to falling asleep while driving. Thirteen people in all were injured, but the band members were not gravely hurt. Revolver reported that they "narrowly survived" the incident. In April 2018, Antreassian revealed he had two fractured vertebrae and, as a consequence, played with a back brace for a month. Puciato tore a quadriceps, which he did not treat immediately, and later revealed that he began to suffer from serious mental health issues during this tour, including panic disorder and hypochondria, but following the accident his symptoms became "almost unlivable" and had to receive treatment. Fans raised over $20,000 in a week to the band following the crash.

On September 5, The Dillinger Escape Plan were honoured at the 2017 Association of Independent Music Awards. The band received the "Outstanding Contribution to Music" prize at the ceremony at The Brewery, Clerkenwell.

The band's final show took place at Terminal 5 in New York City on December 29, 2017, with Code Orange and Daughters as support acts. The band also played two additional shows on December 27 and 28. On the first night, Mike Patton joined the band onstage to perform their collaborative EP Irony Is a Dead Scene. On the second and third night, original frontman Dimitri Minakakis was a guest to perform several early Dillinger songs, also singing "43% Burnt" with Puciato. Former guitarist Brian Benoit also was a special guest on December 27 and 28. On the final night, founding bassist Adam Doll played keyboards on the last song "Dissociation", which was debuted live and accompanied by New York string quartet seven)suns.

=== Post-disbandment (2018–2023) ===
Puciato continued touring with his electronic band The Black Queen throughout 2018 and has plans to record as Killer Be Killed for a second album. Weinman became the rhythm guitarist for Suicidal Tendencies in 2018. He is also the manager for Grammy award-winning artist Kimbra, while also running an animal sanctuary from his home in New Jersey. Wilson formed the progressive metal band Azusa with members of Extol and Sea + Air, and released their debut album in November 2018. He has also been playing bass occasionally for Devin Townsend.

In September 2019, Rymer reunited with Weinman while playing a series of shows for Suicidal Tendencies as a fill-in for Dave Lombardo. He has also been performing as the touring drummer for Ho99o9, and has joined the band thoughtcrimes. Antreassian owns and operates Back Room Studios in Rockaway, New Jersey, which operates as a full recording studio and rentable rehearsal space.

Puciato released the poetry and photography book Separate the Dawn on February 12, 2019, marking the second anniversary of the band's bus accident in Poland. It was written during the last Dillinger tour and released through Federal Prisoner. Puciato would later announce his first full-scale North American solo tour that would take place in May and June 2023.

In March 2023, Sumerian Comics announced a four issue comic series in celebration of the tenth anniversary of One of Us Is the Killer. The series took inspiration from the story behind the album's production and lyrics and expanded it into a fictional and futuristic crime story. Ben Weinman appeared at WonderCon in promotion and signed copies of the first issue.

In April 2023, it was announced that Puciato would form part of a new hardcore supergroup known as Better Lovers; consisting of three ex-Every Time I Die members in the form of Jordan Buckley, Steve Micciche and Clayton Holyoak, and Will Putney of Fit For An Autopsy. The band released their debut single "30 Under 13" during this time, and announced a run of UK shows for October 2023.

=== Reunion with Dimitri Minakakis (2023–present) ===
On December 12, 2023, the Dillinger Escape Plan announced a reunion with founding vocalist Dimitri Minakakis at the Brooklyn Paramount on June 21, 2024 to celebrate the 25th anniversary of their debut album Calculating Infinity. Two additional shows on June 22 and 23 were added. The lineup included final members Ben Weinman (lead guitar), Liam Wilson (bass) and Billy Rymer (drums).

In March 2024, Weinman announced that James Love, who last played with the band from 2012 to 2015, would return on rhythm guitar. The band also announced European shows in August 2024. In June 2026, the Dillinger Escape Plan announced the final shows of their reunion, which included dates at the Hellfest and Graspop festivals, with the last show in November on the Headbangers Boat cruise.

== Artistry ==
The way I've heard Dillinger described most throughout the years is 'organised chaos', you know? [laughs] To the layman person, it sounds like a mess, but for someone who takes the time to look into it and work on it and listen to it, they can tell that every note has its place and it's really intentional.

— Ben Weinman, 2016

=== Genres and style ===
The Dillinger Escape Plan's music is rooted in extreme metal, metalcore and post-hardcore, and draws heavily from progressive rock, electronic music and jazz fusion. They have been characterized as mathcore, metalcore, progressive metal, experimental metal, noise metal, noisecore, and jazzcore. Several reviewers have described their early albums as grindcore and hardcore punk, performed from a technical approach. John Adamian of the Hartford Courant classified Dillinger as "a kind of knotted, complex, abrasive math rock", as well as "prog metal that embraces an avant-garde level of coiled and meshed intricacies." AllMusic writer Ryan Downey describes the group as "maniacally intense", "crushingly metallic", "displaying rigorous physical endurance", while at the same time notes their "precise musicianship" and "meticulously thought-out" compositions. John Adamian commented: "Listening to [The Dillinger Escape Plan] sometimes feels like being ground between a system of elaborate gears. Chromatic turns and cycling patterns notch all the pieces together. The guitars are often dissonant, shifting into double and triple time, with vocals that deliver a blow-torch scorch." After Calculating Infinity, they constantly incorporated new sounds and other styles, "even commercial ones", as Andrew Earles of Spin said, and their albums became "packed with the sometimes brutal, sometimes beautiful music only they play" that "skids from grindcore to progressive jazz and beyond". Some reviewers have compared them with jazz-grindcore project Naked City and progressive metal band Meshuggah. When asked to define The Dillinger Escape Plan's music, bassist Liam Wilson said: "I usually tell my parents' generation that we sound like what might happen if you took the sophistication of King Crimson and cross-bred us with the snottiness of the Sex Pistols... or 'punk jazz' which is how Jaco Pastorius once described his sound."

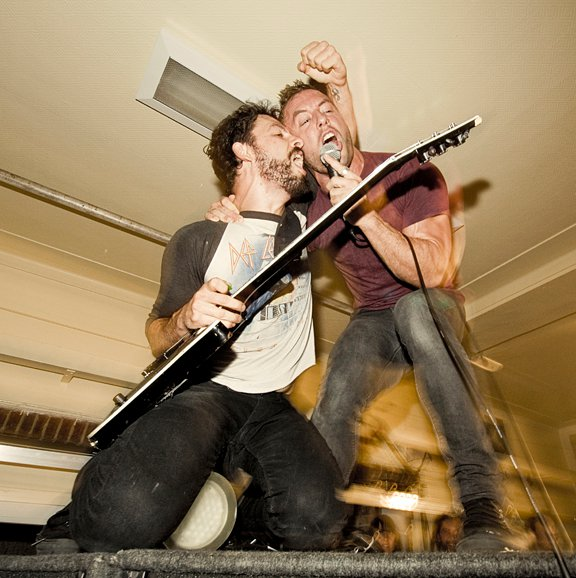
Ben Weinman and Greg Puciato performing in 2011

In the words of lead guitarist Ben Weinman, the prime mover of The Dillinger Escape Plan, the band's first albums intended to "stir things up", "really try things new", and "challenge people" within the 1990s hardcore punk scene. He felt that many of its bands were trying to sound like their predecessors from the previous decade rather than "encompass the[ir] attitude", which influenced him deeply, and others were more interested in "joining into cliques" such as straight edge, religious or political groups, instead of prioritizing their music.

At the start of the group, Weinman considered The Dillinger Escape Plan an electronic-infused metal band as both he and Pennie were inspired by IDM music. However, the members were still knowing each other and "[figuring] out what it was that we wanted to do". After their debut EP, the band was joined by guitar shredder John Fulton and, prior to composing the Under the Running Board EP, all the members became interested in technical extreme metal and shortly afterward progressive music and jazz fusion. They tried to adapt the use of odd time signatures and polyrhythms of these artists to a punk context, thus starting to compose pieces with these characteristics and repeat them until they could play it as fast as they could. From then until their first studio album, Calculating Infinity, they explored more unconventional drum patterns, such as taking notes away to expand their rhythms, or Pennie playing as hard as he could and using china cymbals excessively instead of splashes. While Pennie composed from a more academic approach, working on theory books for days, Weinman had a more intuitive approach. They attribute the "tug and pull of" both personalities as a key element in The Dillinger Escape Plan development, but also as the reason for the drummer's eventual departure from it.

The groundbreaking 1999 debut created a huge hype, but the band members gained an interest on melodic songwriting and production along the way, and also wanted to fully explore their electronic influences. Hence, following the departure of Dimitri Minakakis, they did this on the Irony Is a Dead Scene EP with Mike Patton, which "opened the doors" for the band's experimentation.

Looking to cover all their musical influences and both Minakakis and Patton's ranges, the band hired Greg Puciato, whose vocal delivery spans styles from screaming to crooning, and he was encouraged to sing by the other members. While maintaining their original style, on 2004's Miss Machine they incorporated more melody, industrial influences and strings, as well as two songs that were not initially composed for Dillinger nor in their usual style to "not be pigeonholed". Their next release, Ire Works, featured more sounds ranging from "glitchy electropop" to Latin jazz, an increasing use of programming and instruments such as horns and piano. 2010's Option Paralysis has more piano, vocal harmonies and on this album the band "learned how to merge [all these new] elements" within the songs rather than separating them from song to song, as Puciato stated. He referred to its follow-up, One of Us Is the Killer, as a continuation of this and it was the first since Calculating Infinity where they composed all the music during its songwriting process. Scott A. Gray of Exclaim! stated: "The tightness, the focus of [One of Us Is the Killer], was ludicrous, seemingly taken as far as it could go". On the contrary, Dissociation drew from all their different inspirations but mostly from song to song, including, for example, long instrumental sections of IDM and jazz fusion, and some parts were composed many years before its recording.

The band's lyrics are considered to be introspective and pessimistic. Additionally, metaphors are commonly used in the band's lyrics.

=== Influences ===
The background of the early Dillinger Escape Plan members was diverse. Some, including bassist Adam Doll, guitarist John Fulton and drummer Chris Pennie, were mostly influenced by technical players, as well as death metal bands such as Death, Morbid Angel, Carcass, and Meshuggah, whereas guitarist Ben Weinman and vocalist Dimitri Minakakis by metalcore and post-hardcore bands of the 1990s, particularly Deadguy, Dazzling Killmen, Today Is the Day, Coalesce, Fugazi, and Drive Like Jehu. While Weinman still appreciated heavy metal, he became "desensitized" to most of it because "there weren't new bands or old bands creating new albums that were pushing anything [new]" and felt it had become "formulaic". He and Pennie were also heavily inspired by IDM artists, especially Aphex Twin, Squarepusher and Autechre. What tied all the band members together was their admiration for progressive and jazz fusion artists such as King Crimson, Cynic, Meshuggah and Mahavishnu Orchestra, particularly their albums Discipline, Focus, Destroy Erase Improve and Apocalypse respectively. They credit these artists for their choice of complex time signatures and unconventional beat accenting. The guitarist also cited IDM music for his use of chaotic riffs, stating that, in some ways, they did "the guitar version of [intelligent dance music], using certain rhythms and frequencies" that sound "so random, but the more you listened to it, the more it made sense, and actually had intention." They learned how to blend all their initial influences on the Under the Running Board EP, and, for this album, the joining of Fulton had a major impact on Weinman's guitar playing through the incorporation of more technical types of guitar work. The group, however, did not fully display their electronic influences until the Irony Is a Dead Scene EP because of the lack of equipment and time restraints.

Between the period of writing and promoting Calculating Infinity, 1997's OK Computer by Radiohead had an important effect on Ben Weinman, whereas 1998's Psyence Fiction by Unkle and 1999's The Fragile by Nine Inch Nails influenced Chris Pennie. These records led the band to focus more on songwriting, production and experimentation on their next album, Miss Machine, instead of just "rip everything as fast as we can". Former drummer Chris Pennie went to jazz school and was especially inspired by Cynic's Sean Reinert, Vinnie Colaiuta, Terry Bozzio, Meshuggah's Tomas Haake and DJ Shadow, whereas Liam Wilson cited Jaco Pastorius and James Jamerson as his biggest bass inspirations. Among the main guitar influences of The Dillinger Escape Plan were Mahavishnu Orchestra's John McLaughlin, King Crimson's Robert Fripp and Steve Vai. For his part, vocalist Greg Puciato cited Mike Patton of Faith No More and H.R. of Bad Brains as his biggest influences when growing up, stating that he learned to sing by emulating them, and on the other hand Death's Chuck Schuldiner for screaming. He said of the former: "[They] opened my eyes a lot to what could be done with the voice overtop of heavy music".

=== Songwriting ===
Prior to Puciato's joining, Weinman was responsible for writing lyrics in many earlier songs, including Jim Fear, which was named after a road near his childhood elementary school and inspired by an encounter with an escaped psychiatric hospital patient.

The songwriting process of The Dillinger Escape Plan usually started with Weinman's guitar ideas and, especially since Ire Works, software' rhythms or sound design that he presented to the drummer. Until the recording sessions, the two could barely perform some of these pieces in an accurate way because of their complexity. Both wrote and focused on approximately ten seconds of music every day, developing them through jam sessions and afterward joining several parts that "could go cohesively" together. They send these demos to Greg Puciato and Liam Wilson: The first joined different pieces together and worked over them, making "a picture that means something to" him. Puciato stated that he could spend days to just compose a fifteen seconds part the way he wanted. Usually, Liam Wilson was the last member to compose due to the suggestion of producer Steve Evetts, who is also a bassist, in order that he could counterpoint with any instrument, including Puciato's vocals and the electronics.

Weinman and Puciato consider themselves to be songwriters instead of a guitarist and a vocalist, and, over time, they added diverse instruments and samples on some songs, focusing on what would fit best into them rather than their live instrumentation. Ben Ratliff from the New York Times describes Dillinger as "composer music," citing their use of "glitch" noises, orchestral sections, and extraneous percussion such as bells.

=== Recording ===
Since their inception, Steve Evetts was the producer, sound engineer and mixer of almost all The Dillinger Escape Plan's releases. His close involvement in these roles led him to be considered as another member of the band. The recording sessions were often described as exhausting because the members tracked sections in a way they thought were fine as the final take, but Evetts made them repeat some of these a large number of times until it sounded "like a Pro Tools copy-paste", yet without the use of audio effects. The producer nitpicked details such as Wilson's type of plectrum and its angle of playing. Puciato, Weinman and Evetts rarely worked all together in the studio; while two of them were recording, the other was absent to "[stay] fresh" so that, later on, "he can make comments and it's easy enough to be objective" for making adjustments. From Option Paralysis on, Puciato and Weinman became largely involved in the recording process, working on it to the point of "obsession", and postponed their recording deadlines for months in order to redo their album mixes numerous times.

=== Stage performances ===
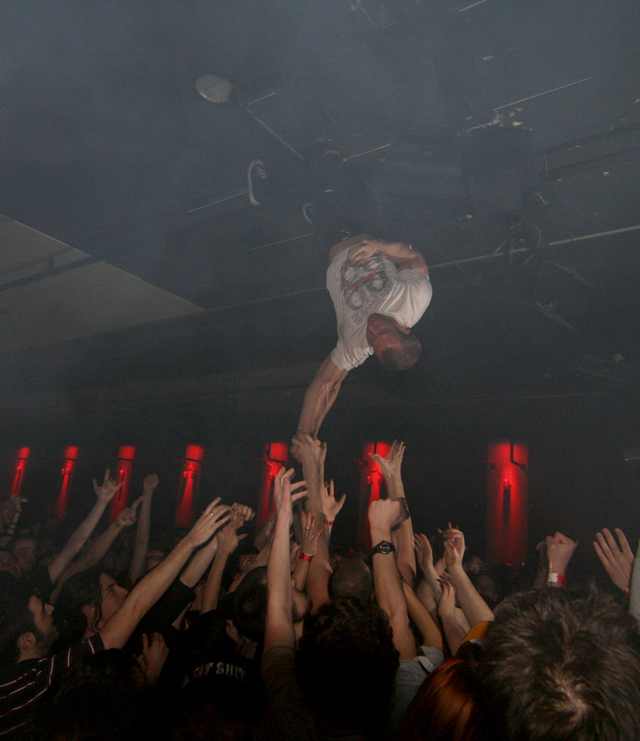
Greg Puciato hanging upside down during a Dillinger show in 2008

The Dillinger Escape Plan was noted for their reckless, chaotic live shows. While playing, some band members would climb up and leap off of parts of the stage, bounce off walls, dive into moshpits and destroy their own gear. Over time they incorporated samples, a light show and other elements.

In their early performances, Ben Weinman threw his guitar across the rooms in which they played and, shortly afterward, Dimitri Minakakis started to breathe fire. The band's turning point came in 2001 with the new vocalist Greg Puciato, whose imposing body and destructive antics, coupled with his vocal expertise, made him "the perfect physical embodiment of The Dillinger Escape Plan's music." The singer kept blowing fire continuously until The Station nightclub fire happened (an incident unrelated to the band which restricted the use of pyrotechnics) and began to run violently from the stage on top of the crowd. Initially, the band had a "pirate-ship mentality" which involved several destructive acts, but they stopped performing some of these after receiving various lawsuits. The concerts caused the band members both direct and cumulative injuries.

Their physical performances were improvised and, despite the aggressive nature of their shows, they "just want[ed] to be as pure and in the moment as possible vocally and physically", rather than performing acts that can cause harm to others. Weinman said their live shows were initially influenced by him "hating people" and he used them as "a way for after school, or work, after a long week, to play a show and just vent". According to him, these were also inspired by bands such as Deadguy and Coalesce, while his ethic to always make performances their priority came from Fugazi.

==== Reading controversy ====
At the 2002 edition of the prestigious Reading Festival, the Dillinger Escape Plan's performance made national United Kingdom headlines after vocalist Greg Puciato defecated in full view onstage, put it into a bag, and threw it into the crowd before smearing the rest onto himself, proclaiming "This is a bag of shit, I just wanted to show you this so you'll recognize it later on throughout the day" referring to the quality of some bands he felt were appearing that day of the festival, particularly Puddle of Mudd. The act nearly got the band banned from the UK for violation of public-decency laws, despite this the band's set was one of the highest reviewed of the entire festival that year, and was later included in a list of the top one hundred Reading or Leeds performances of the decade. Upon returning to Reading in 2016, Puciato played the opening song "Prancer" sitting on an onstage couch reading a newspaper and drinking tea.

Puciato later commented on the act saying;

There was no way in hell that I thought that we were ever going make a living doing this or that in fourteen years I would still be having a conversation as Greg from Dillinger Escape Plan. I just thought this was a ball of fire that's gonna implode or it's got a shelf life, there's no way this can continue. So when we would get asked to play something like that in my head I was like 'well, this is never going to happen again, when am I ever going to play a festival with bands I don't like. That was kind of the other thing, that was the first time we ever played with bands we don't like [...] we had never been exposed to some like mass thing where you're playing with a band like Puddle of Mudd or whoever it was at the time who made me feel like "Oh I got to make some kind of a statement." So it was kind of a combo of kind of wanting to cause the biggest ruckus imaginable, since we're obviously never going to do this again anyway, I might as well make sure that we're never allowed to do this again anyway.

=== Business practices and ethics ===
Throughout most of their career, The Dillinger Escape Plan led a steadfast DIY ethic. In the beginning, they were managed by long time friend of the band Tom Apostolopoulos, who acted as a tour manager, along with Ben Weinman, and, since the Miss Machine's touring cycle, only by the latter. During the first years, both were in charge of the financial affairs of the band, scheduled tours by calling all their phone contacts, rented and booked transport, and placed flyers printed by Weinman on the walls of New Jersey. Until 2011, Greg Puciato was in charge of merchandising, clothing design and mailing. Their road crew was not expanded substantially over the years and the band members kept contributing to the technical and traveling tasks until their last tour.

Their work ethic was directly inspired by the 1990s American hardcore punk scene. They also cited Mike Patton as both an artistic and business "mentor". The singer's influence on The Dillinger Escape Plan began on their 1999 tour supporting Patton's Mr. Bungle, particularly by seeing how he decided to travel in a van, carry and set up his own gear, and not hire a technician, despite having "had recently been playing stadiums with Faith No More", but simultaneously he had a perfectionist standard on their live shows and did not open the venues at which they played until the sound was ideal.

In 2009, Weinman founded the independent record label Party Smasher Inc. for all things related to The Dillinger Escape Plan, as well as hosting diverse independent artists and contributors. Weinman stated that, rather than creating a record label as such, this was intended to give them total freedom to explore all the possibilities of the music industry in the Information Age instead of being restricted by a traditional record deal. They released their last three albums on the label.

Although never having had an agenda on their lyrics, the band members were outspoken and usually controversial in interviews. In 2016, Puciato said: "We give a lot of fucks about not giving a fuck, if that makes sense. We have a really high level of quality control about not putting parameters and cages around ourselves creatively. That's kind of been the only motivation I've ever had". On Miss Machine, they included the songs "Unretrofied" and "Phone Home" that were not initially composed for Dillinger nor in their usual style in order to not "be confined into a specific space". 2006's cover album Plagiarism was intended "to tell the close-minded metal community that it's OK to listen to other music". After their first albums, they toured with bands from diverse genres outside of the metalcore scene to prevent being "pigeonholed into" it. They were vocal about their dislike for styles such as nu metal and mainstream metalcore of the early to mid-2000s, as well as mocking musicians such as Jared Leto, Nickelback, Puddle of Mudd, Disturbed, Avenged Sevenfold, Atreyu, and Linkin Park.

At different line-ups, all of them were straight edge and, as of mid-2005, most had only vegetarian catering while touring. Bassist Liam Wilson, who was a vegan, appeared in several pro-vegan advertisements for PETA since the mid-2000s and the whole band did it in 2008 against dog fighting. While touring, the band placed a voter registration booth for the 2004 United States presidential election. The Dillinger Escape Plan did several charity concerts and sold merchandise with a portion of their profit's toward philanthropic organizations, including Music for Relief, the Juvenile Diabetes Research Foundation, The Trevor Project, among others. On one occasion, The Dillinger Escape Plan rejected a tour slot with thrash metal group Slayer in spite of being fans of them, because their lyrics and imagery regarding Nazism were "questionable" and "never ... sufficiently explained" to Weinman, who had relatives that were murdered in the Holocaust.

== Legacy ==
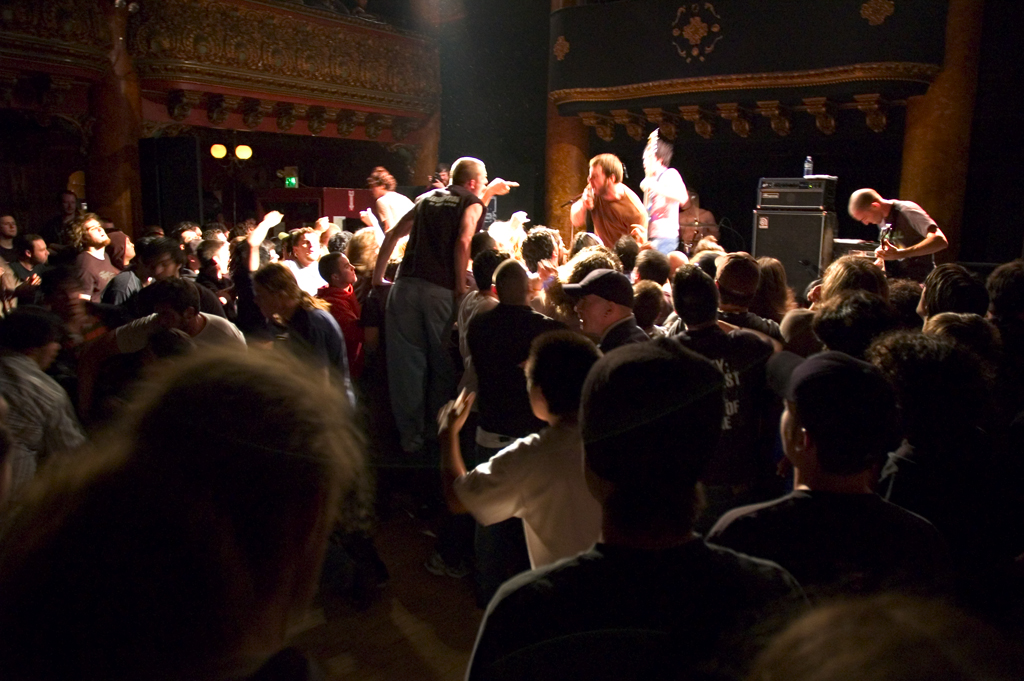
Audience members moshing at a Dillinger Escape Plan show

The Dillinger Escape Plan is often considered one of the most influential bands in extreme music circles since the late 1990s. The impact of their idiosyncratic style has been compared to the ones of My Bloody Valentine on shoegaze and Refused on post-hardcore. Alex Lynham of MusicRadar states that "Dillinger Escape Plan are one of the few guitar bands of the past 25 years to make a total and radical break with the music of the past and forge a unique sound", spawning "countless imitators, iterations and acolytes". Maximus Frank of MetalSucks has remarked "The Dillinger Escape Plan will be remembered as one of the greatest bands of all time – and possibly, the greatest punk band ever. Full stop." Drowned in Sound's Ben Patashnik declared in 2007 that Dillinger is one of the few bands to have "emerged from small, insular, resolutely non-mainstream scenes" and at the same time "managed to reach well further than one might reasonably think possible."

The Dillinger Escape Plan were honored at the 2017 Association of Independent Music Awards. The band received the "Outstanding Contribution to Music" prize at the ceremony at The Brewery, Clerkenwell. The AIM Awards judge and Metal Hammer editor Merlin Alderslade said:

"The Dillinger Escape Plan aren't only one of the most influential heavy bands of the last 20 years, but one of the single most important forces to ever grace our scene. From their genre-shredding albums that have gone on to inspire legions of bands to their now legendary live shows, they have trail-blazed their way through an incredible career that has united alternative music fans from all walks of life. The AIM awards are about recognizing music crafted in the true spirit of independence and I couldn't think of a more fitting band to walk on stage to accept this award than Dillinger."

== Awards and nominations ==
PLUG Independent Music Awards

Year	Nominee / work	Award	Result
2005	The Dillinger Escape Plan	Live Act of the Year	Nominated
2005	Miss Machine	Metal Album of the Year	Won
2008	Ire Works	Metal Album of the Year	Won

Kerrang! Awards

Year	Nominee / work	Award	Result
2008	The Dillinger Escape Plan	Best Live Band	Nominated
2008	The Dillinger Escape Plan	Spirit of Independence	Won
2014	The Dillinger Escape Plan	Inspiration	Won

Revolver Golden Gods Award

Year	Nominee / work	Award	Result
2010	The Dillinger Escape Plan	Best Underground Band	Won

AIM Awards

Year	Nominee / work	Award	Result
2017	The Dillinger Escape Plan	Outstanding Contribution to Music	Won

Metal Hammer Golden Gods Awards

Year	Nominee / work	Award	Result
2017	The Dillinger Escape Plan	Icon	Won

Revolver magazine

Year	Nominee / work	Award	Result
2018	The Dillinger Escape Plan	5 Greatest Live Bands of All Time (readers poll)	1

== Band members ==
Current

- Ben Weinman – lead guitar, keyboards, piano, programming, backing vocals (1997–2006, 2006–2017, 2023–present), rhythm guitar (1997, 2007–2008, 2012–2013), bass (1999–2000)
- Liam Wilson – bass, backing vocals (2000–2017, 2023–present)
- Billy Rymer – drums, percussion (2008–2017, 2023–present)
- Dimitri Minakakis – lead vocals (1997–2001, 2023–present)
- James Love – rhythm guitar (2005–2006, 2012–2015, 2024–present)

== Discography ==
Studio albums

- Calculating Infinity (1999)
- Miss Machine (2004)
- Ire Works (2007)
- Option Paralysis (2010)
- One of Us Is the Killer (2013)
- Dissociation (2016)

== Sources ==
- Pennie, Chris (January 7, 2008). Bergamini, Joe (ed.). Polyrhythmic Potential. Carl Fischer Music Publisher. ISBN 978-0825865886.
- Pettigrew, Jason (2008). "Episode #13: Dillinger Escape Plan". Alternative Press (Podcast). Player.fm.
- Mudrian, Albert; Stewart-Panko, Kevin (2009). "100% CLASSIC". Precious Metal: Decibel Presents the Stories Behind 25 Extreme Metal Masterpieces. Da Capo Press. pp. 304–317. ISBN 978-0306818066.
- Farris, Diane (December 22, 2011). Diane's Kamikaze Fun Machine from 12/22/2011 (radio broadcast). WFMU.
- Hartmann, Graham (September 14, 2016). "The Dillinger Escape Plan's Ben Weinman - Wikipedia: Fact or Fiction?" (video). Loudwire.
- "Episode 13 w/ Chris Pennie formerly of Coheed & Cambria & Dillinger Escape Plan". Rocknrollbeerguy.libsyn.com (Podcast). April 25, 2017. Archived from the original on April 25, 2018.
- Rowatt, Christina (November 6, 2017). "Dillinger Escape Plan Interview with Ben Weinman 2017: The End, The Beginning, Mike Patton & More" (video and text). Voidau.com.
- Kennelty, Greg; Ulrich, Lars (December 17, 2017). "THE DILLINGER ESCAPE PLAN Offer Final Interview To METALLICA's Lars Ulrich, Talk Having No Regrets About Ending The Band" (video). Metal Injection.
