= Infinite Games =

Studio album by The Black Queen
- Released: September 28, 2018
- Genre: Synthwave; new wave; industrial rock; darkwave
- Length: 46:14
- Label: Self-released; Federal Prisoner

The Black Queen chronology
Fever Daydream (2016)	Infinite Games (2018)

Singles from Infinite Games
- 1. "Thrown into the Dark" Released: 2018

Infinite Games is the second studio album by American electronic band The Black Queen, released independently on September 28, 2018.

== Critical reception ==
Infinite Games has been critically acclaimed since its release. On review aggregator website, Album of the Year, Infinite Games has an average rating of 80 out of 100 based on three contemporary critic reviews indicating critical acclaim.

== Track listing ==
No.	Title	Length
1.	"Even Still I Want To"	2:10
2.	"Thrown into the Dark"	5:00
3.	"No Accusations"	5:39
4.	"Your Move"	5:12
5.	"Lies About You"	5:47
6.	"Impossible Condition"	6:47
7.	"Spatial Boundaries"	3:37
8.	"100 to Zero"	2:25
9.	"Porcelain Veins"	2:42
10.	"One Edge of Two"	6:55
Total length:		46:14

== Charts ==
Chart (2018)	Peak position
Australian Albums (ARIA)	60
US Heatseekers Albums (Billboard)	8
US Independent Albums (Billboard)	20
US Top Album Sales (Billboard)	90
US Top Dance/Electronic Albums (Billboard)	15
US Vinyl Albums (Billboard)	16

== Accolades ==
Publication	Country	Accolade	Year	Rank
Kerrang!	UK	Kerrang!'s 50 Albums That Shook 2018	2018	48
Revolver	US	30 Best Albums of 2018	2018	29
