= List of Dillinger Escape Plan band members =

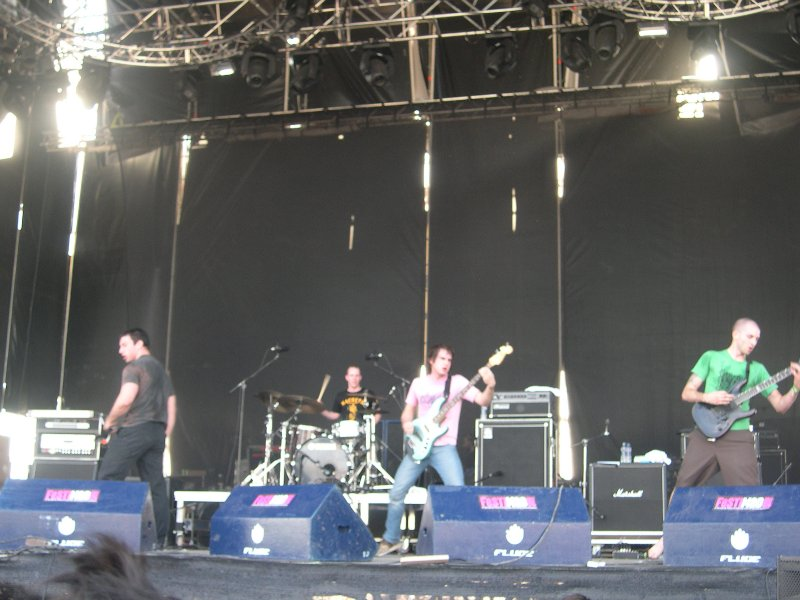
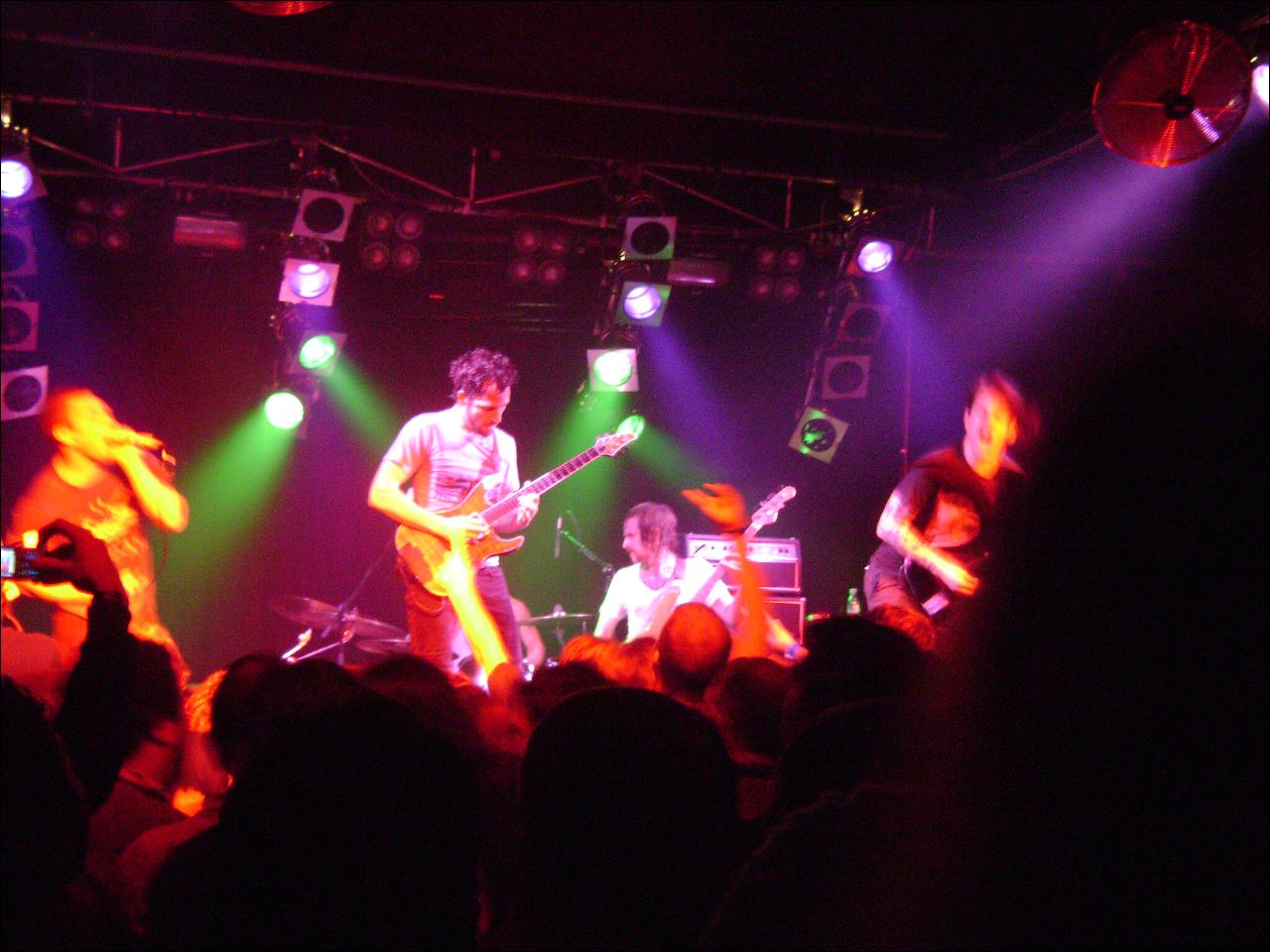
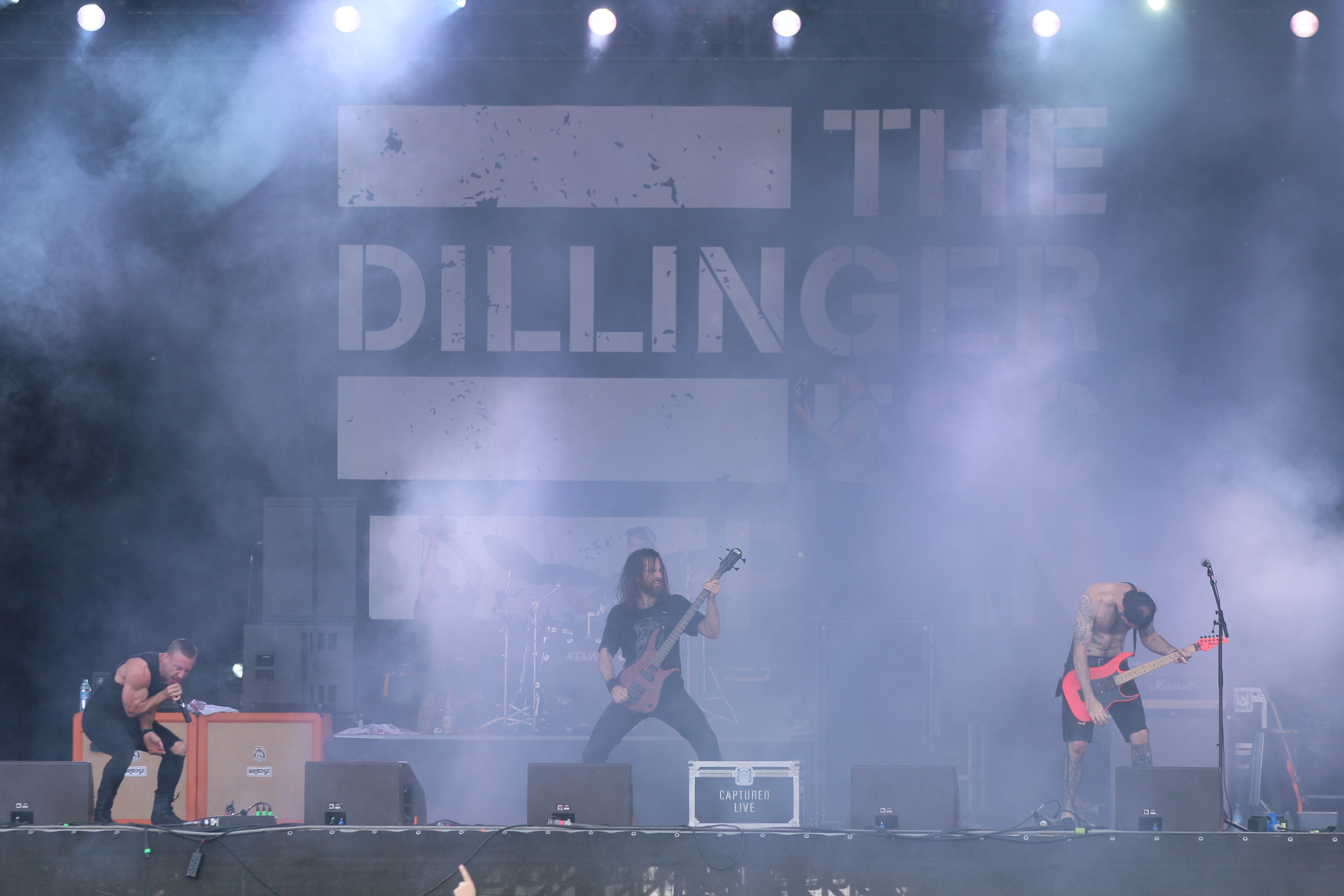
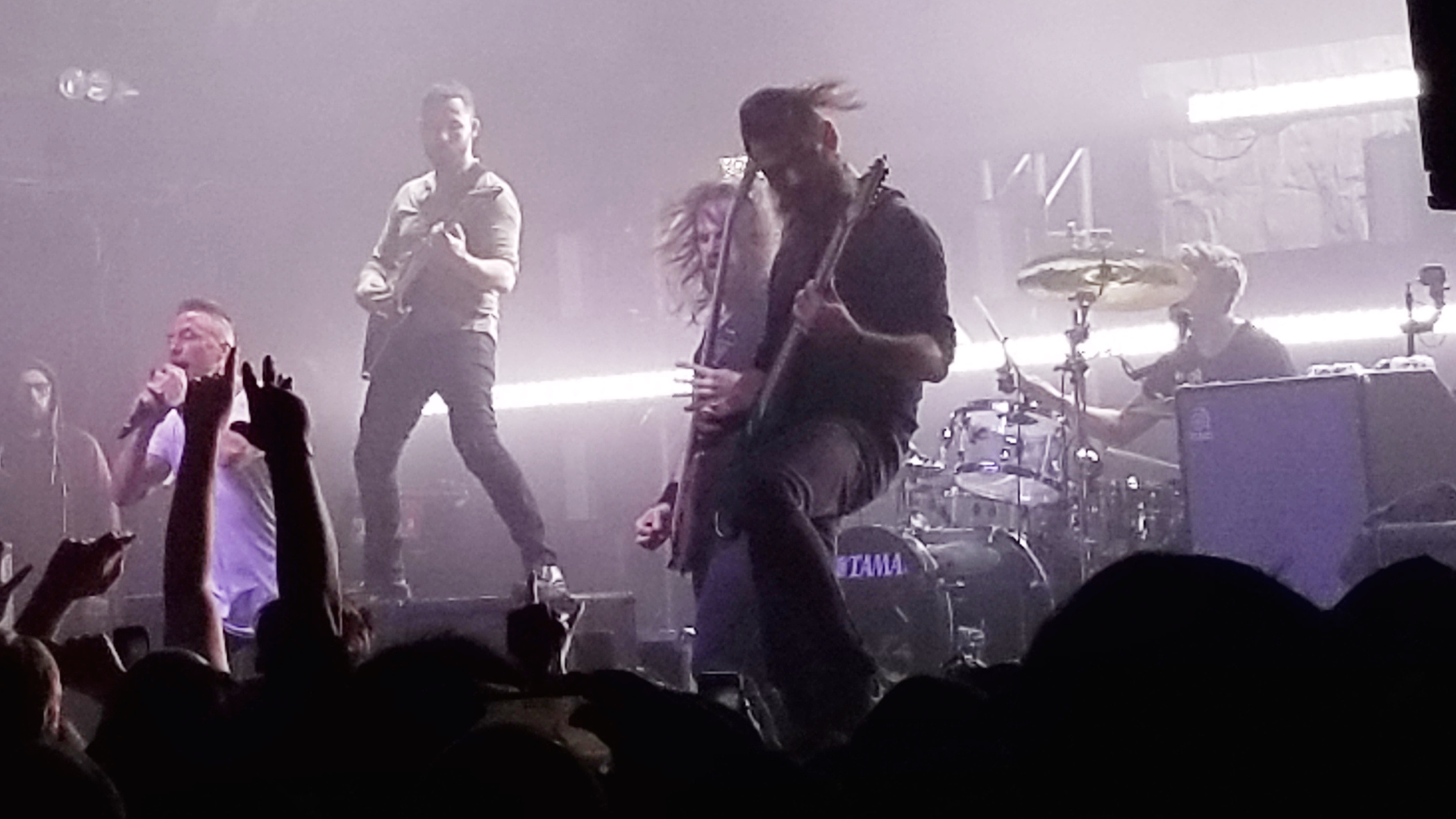
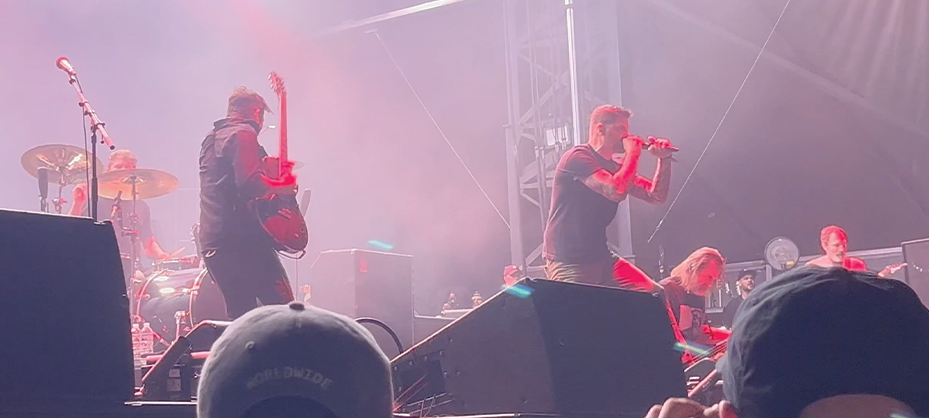
The Dillinger Escape Plan performing in 2005, 2008, 2014, 2017, and 2025

The Dillinger Escape Plan (DEP) is an American metalcore band from Morris Plains, New Jersey. Formed in early 1997, the group originally featured vocalist Dimitri Minakakis, lead guitarist Ben Weinman, rhythm guitarist Derek Brantley, bassist and keyboardist Adam Doll, and drummer and keyboardist Chris Pennie. The group currently consists of Weinman (a constant member) and Minakakis (who rejoined when the band reunited in 2023), alongside bassist Liam Wilson (since 2000), rhythm guitarist James Love (who first joined in 2005) and drummer Billy Rymer (since 2009).

== History ==
DEP evolved from an earlier hardcore punk group called Arcane in March 1997, and originally featured Minakakis, Weinman, Brantley, Doll and Pennie. Brantley left after just two shows, failing to turn up for the group's first recording sessions. The remaining members were forced to record the band's self-titled debut extended play (EP) for Now or Never Records as a four-piece. Shortly after the EP's release, Brantley's position was taken over by John Fulton, who performed on tour with the group later in the year. In 1998, the band released its second EP Under the Running Board, shortly after which Fulton left due to "creative differences". He was replaced by Jesuit guitarist Brian Benoit in time for the recording of the group's full-length debut album Calculating Infinity.

Just before the recording of Calculating Infinity started, Doll was involved in a road traffic accident in which he suffered a spinal fracture which paralyzed him from the chest down; he was forced to step back from the band, and Weinman performed bass on the album. After the album was finished, Doll was replaced by former M.O.D. bassist Jeff Wood, who was credited in the liner notes as "live bass machine". Wood toured with the group until autumn 2000, when he was replaced by Liam Wilson. In April 2001, it was announced that Minakakis had decided to leave DEP to pursue "non-music related endeavors". Before hiring a replacement, the group worked with former Faith No More and Mr. Bungle frontman Mike Patton on the EP Irony Is a Dead Scene, released the following year.

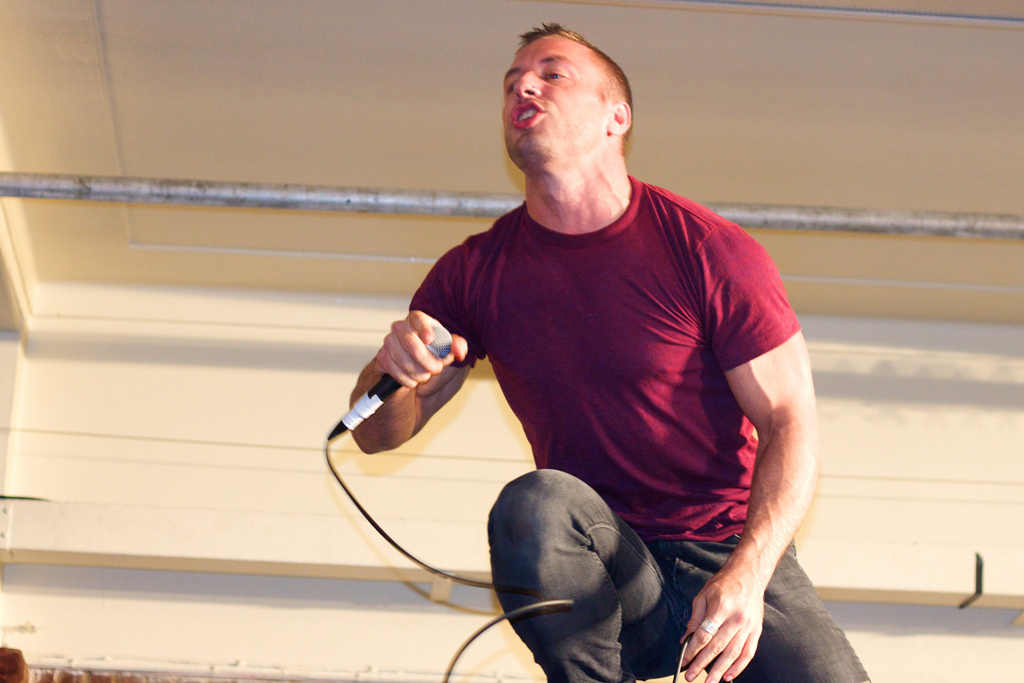
Greg Puciato joined the band in October 2001, after original frontman Dimitri Minakakis left in April.

In October 2001, DEP announced that Greg Puciato was the band's new frontman, chosen from "over one hundred" singers who auditioned by submitting a recording of "43% Burnt". The new lineup's first release was Miss Machine, issued in 2004 as the follow-up to Calculating Infinity. Benoit underwent "major surgery" in December that year, and the next April suffered nerve damage in his left hand which rendered him unable to play guitar. He briefly tried to remain in the band on keyboards, but by May had left the band completely. James Love, formerly of Fenix TX, took his place on rhythm guitar at Benoit's own blessing. In 2006, the band released the digital-only EP Plagiarism, which featured "Unretrofied" in addition to four cover versions and a live recording of "The Perfect Design".

During a tour in August 2006, the band performed four shows without lead guitarist Ben Weinman for the first time, who it was announced had flown home to "deal with some personal issues". However, in subsequent interviews Weinman claimed that he had in fact briefly left the group due to various issues, including frustration with an arm injury he had suffered, as well as tensions with bandmates. During the four shows without Weinman, drummer Chris Pennie was offered a role in Coheed and Cambria, however he was contractually obliged to remain with the group. After the shows, Jeff Tuttle replaced Love.

By June 2007, Pennie had officially left the band to join Coheed and Cambria, with drums on the upcoming album Ire Works recorded by Gil Sharone. The following month, Tuttle was officially unveiled as the band's new guitarist, although Weinman recorded all guitars on the album. The following year, rumors began to circulate that Sharone had left the band, although Weinman initially denied them. Early the next year, however, his departure was confirmed and Billy Rymer had taken his place. In 2010, the band released its fourth album Option Paralysis, which was the first to feature contributions from guitarist Tuttle.

In August 2012, at the end of the touring cycle for Option Paralysis, Tuttle announced that he was leaving the band to attend film school. By November, he had been replaced by returning member James Love, although he did not feature on 2013's One of Us Is the Killer as Weinman described him as "a live guy". Love remained until May 2015, when he was replaced by Kevin Antreassian. In 2016, the group released its sixth studio album Dissociation, shortly after which they announced that they would be disbanding after the album's touring cycle. The tour came to an end with three final shows in December 2017, at which former members Dimitri Minakakis, Brian Benoit and Adam Doll, plus Irony Is a Dead Scene vocalist Mike Patton, made special guest appearances.

In December 2023, the band reunited with original frontman Minakakis to celebrate the 25th anniversary of Calculating Infinity. Other returning members are Weinman, Wilson, Love and Rymer.

== Members ==
=== Current members ===
Image	Name	Years active	Instruments	Release contributions
	Ben Weinman	1997–2006; 2006–2017; 2023–present	lead guitar; rhythm guitar (1997, 1998, 2012–2013, 2015); bass (1997); keyboards; programming; backing vocals	all releases
	Dimitri Minakakis	1997–2001; 2023–present (guest 2017)	lead vocals	all releases from The Dillinger Escape Plan (1997) to Calculating Infinity (1999); Cursed, Unshaven and Misbehavin': Live Infinity (2003); Ire Works (2007) – one track only; Live Infinity (2019)
	Liam Wilson	2000–2017; 2023–present	bass; backing vocals	all releases from Irony Is a Dead Scene (2002) onwards
	James Love	2005–2006; 2012–2015; 2024–present	rhythm guitar; lead guitar (2006)	Plagiarism (2006)
	Billy Rymer	2009–2017; 2023–present	drums; percussion	all releases from Option Paralysis (2010) onwards

=== Former members ===
Image	Name	Years active	Instruments	Release contributions
	Chris Pennie	1997–2007	drums; percussion; keyboards; programming	all releases from The Dillinger Escape Plan (1997) to Plagiarism (2006); Live Infinity (2019)
	Adam Doll	1997–1999; 2001 (session) (guest 2017)	bass (1997–1999); keyboards; programming	all releases from The Dillinger Escape Plan (1997) to Split with Drowningman (1999); Irony Is a Dead Scene (2002)
	Derrick Brantley	1997	rhythm guitar	none – two live performances only
	John Fulton	1997–1998	rhythm guitar	Under the Running Board (1998); Split with NORA (1998); Split with Drowningman (1999)
	Brian Benoit	1998–2005 (guest 2017)	rhythm guitar (until April 2005); keyboards (April – May 2005)	all DEP releases from Calculating Infinity (1999) to Miss Machine (2004); Live Infinity (2019)
	Jeff Wood	1999–2000	bass	none – live performances only
	Greg Puciato	2001–2017	lead vocals	Black on Black: A Tribute to Black Flag (2002); all DEP releases from Miss Machine (2004) onwards
	Jeff Tuttle	2006–2012	rhythm guitar; backing vocals	Option Paralysis (2010)
	Gil Sharone	2007–2009	drums; percussion	Ire Works (2007)
	Kevin Antreassian	2015–2017	rhythm guitar	Dissociation (2016)

=== Touring ===
Image	Name	Years active	Instruments	Details
	Sean Ingram	2001	lead vocals	Ingram performed with the band at Krazy Fest 4 on July 28, 2001 following the departure of Minakakis.
	Mike Patton	2001; 2017 (guest)	lead vocals; keyboards; sampler; percussion	Patton performed at several shows following the departure of Minakakis, and on Irony Is a Dead Scene (2002). He also made guest appearances at one of the bands final shows in December 2017.

== Lineups ==
Period	Members	Releases
March – April 1997	Ben Weinman – lead guitar, keyboards, backing vocals; Chris Pennie – drums, percussion, keyboards; Dimitri Minakakis – lead vocals; Adam Doll – bass; Derrick Brantley – rhythm guitar	none
April – summer 1997	Ben Weinman – guitars, keyboards, backing vocals; Chris Pennie – drums, percussion, keyboards; Dimitri Minakakis – lead vocals; Adam Doll – bass	The Dillinger Escape Plan (1997)
Summer 1997 – November 1998	Ben Weinman – lead guitar, keyboards, backing vocals; Chris Pennie – drums, percussion, keyboards; Dimitri Minakakis – lead vocals; Adam Doll – bass; John Fulton – rhythm guitar	Under the Running Board (1998); Split with NORA (1998); Split with Drowningman (1999)
November 1998 – February 1999	Ben Weinman – lead guitar, keyboards, backing vocals; Chris Pennie – drums, percussion, keyboards; Dimitri Minakakis – lead vocals; Adam Doll – bass; Brian Benoit – rhythm guitar	none
February – summer 1999	Ben Weinman – lead guitar, bass, keyboards, backing vocals; Chris Pennie – drums, percussion, keyboards; Dimitri Minakakis – lead vocals; Brian Benoit – rhythm guitar	Calculating Infinity (1999)
Summer 1999 – autumn 2000	Ben Weinman – lead guitar, keyboards, backing vocals; Chris Pennie – drums, percussion, keyboards; Dimitri Minakakis – lead vocals; Brian Benoit – rhythm guitar; Jeff Wood – bass	none
Autumn 2000 – April 2001	Ben Weinman – lead guitar, keyboards, backing vocals; Chris Pennie – drums, percussion, keyboards; Dimitri Minakakis – lead vocals; Brian Benoit – rhythm guitar; Liam Wilson – bass, backing vocals	Cursed, Unshaven and Misbehavin': Live Infinity (2003); Live Infinity (2019)
July 2001	Ben Weinman – lead guitar, keyboards, backing vocals; Chris Pennie – drums, percussion, keyboards; Brian Benoit – rhythm guitar; Liam Wilson – bass, backing vocals; Sean Ingram – lead vocals (temporary)	none
September – October 2001	Ben Weinman – lead guitar, keyboards, backing vocals; Chris Pennie – drums, percussion, keyboards; Brian Benoit – rhythm guitar; Liam Wilson – bass, backing vocals; Adam Doll – keyboards, programming (session); Mike Patton – lead vocals, sample, keyboards (temporary)	Irony Is a Dead Scene (2002) (collaboration with Mike Patton)
October 2001 – April 2005	Ben Weinman – lead guitar, keyboards, backing vocals; Chris Pennie – drums, percussion, keyboards; Brian Benoit – rhythm guitar; Liam Wilson – bass, backing vocals; Greg Puciato – lead vocals	Miss Machine (2004)
April – May 2005	Ben Weinman – lead guitar, backing vocals; Chris Pennie – drums, percussion; Brian Benoit – keyboards, programming; Liam Wilson – bass, backing vocals; Greg Puciato – lead vocals; James Love – rhythm guitar	none
May 2005 – August 2006	Ben Weinman – lead guitar, keyboards, backing vocals; Chris Pennie – drums, percussion, keyboards; Liam Wilson – bass, backing vocals; Greg Puciato – lead vocals; James Love – rhythm guitar	Plagiarism (2006)
August 2006	Chris Pennie – drums, percussion, keyboards; Liam Wilson – bass, backing vocals; Greg Puciato – lead vocals; James Love – guitars	none
September 2006 – June 2007	Chris Pennie – drums, percussion, keyboards; Liam Wilson – bass, backing vocals; Greg Puciato – lead vocals; Ben Weinman – lead guitar, keyboards, backing vocals; Jeff Tuttle – rhythm guitar, backing vocals	none
June 2007 – January 2009	Liam Wilson – bass, backing vocals; Greg Puciato – lead vocals; Ben Weinman – lead guitar, keyboards, backing vocals; Jeff Tuttle – rhythm guitar, backing vocals; Gil Sharone – drums, percussion	Ire Works (2007) (does not feature Tuttle)
January 2009 – August 2012	Liam Wilson – bass, backing vocals; Greg Puciato – lead vocals; Ben Weinman – lead guitar, keyboards, backing vocals; Jeff Tuttle – rhythm guitar, backing vocals; Billy Rymer – drums, percussion	Option Paralysis (2010)
August – November 2012	Liam Wilson – bass, backing vocals; Greg Puciato – lead vocals; Ben Weinman – guitars, keyboards, backing vocals; Billy Rymer – drums, percussion	none
November 2012 – May 2015	Liam Wilson – bass, backing vocals; Greg Puciato – lead vocals; Ben Weinman – lead guitar, keyboards, backing vocals; Billy Rymer – drums, percussion; James Love – rhythm guitar	One of Us Is the Killer (2013) (does not feature Love)
May 2015 – December 2017	Liam Wilson – bass, backing vocals; Greg Puciato – lead vocals; Ben Weinman – lead guitar, keyboards, backing vocals; Billy Rymer – drums, percussion; Kevin Antreassian – rhythm guitar	Dissociation (2016)
May 2015 – December 2017	December 27, 2017: Brian Benoit – rhythm guitar (special guest); Mike Patton – lead vocals (special guest)	none
May 2015 – December 2017	December 28, 2017: Brian Benoit – rhythm guitar (special guest); Dimitri Minakakis – lead vocals (special guest)	none
May 2015 – December 2017	December 29, 2017: Dimitri Minakakis – lead vocals (special guest); Adam Doll – keyboards, programming (special guest)	none
Band inactive January 2018 – November 2023
December 2023 – present	Liam Wilson – bass, backing vocals; Ben Weinman – lead guitar, keyboards, backing vocals; Billy Rymer – drums, percussion; James Love – rhythm guitar; Dimitri Minakakis – lead vocals	none to date
