= The Dillinger Escape Plan discography =

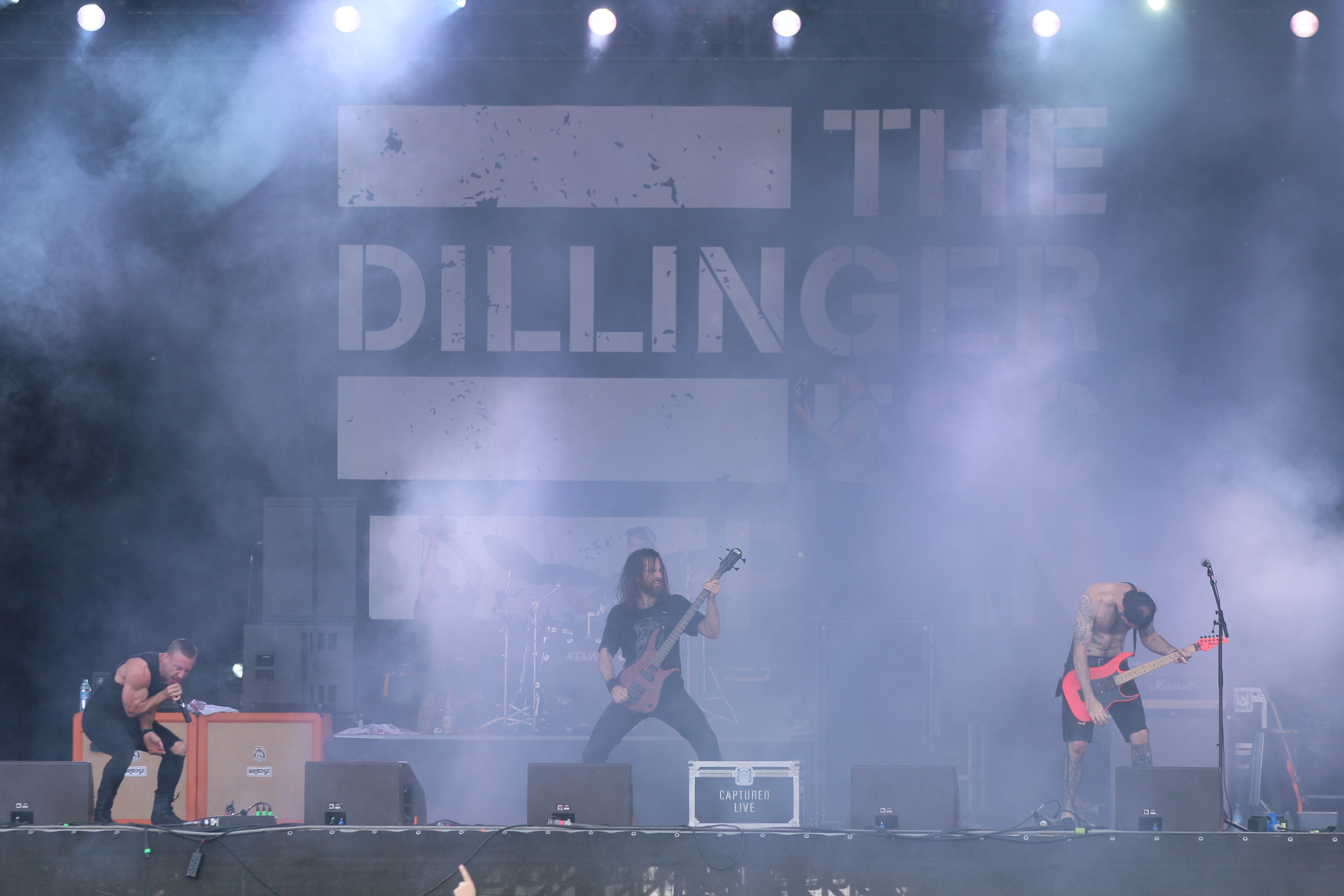
- The Dillinger Escape Plan in 2014.
- Studio albums: 6
- Extended plays: 6
- Singles: 8
- Video albums: 1
- Music videos: 15
- Split EPs: 2
- Other appearances: 7

The discography of The Dillinger Escape Plan, an American mathcore band, consists of six studio albums, six extended plays (EPs), two split EPs, eight singles, one video album, 15 music videos and seven other appearances. Formed in Morris Plains, New Jersey in 1997, the band originally featured vocalist Dimitri Minakakis, guitarists Ben Weinman and Derek Brantley, bassist Adam Doll and drummer Chris Pennie; Brantley left after two shows and was replaced briefly by touring guitarist John Fulton, who himself left in 1998. In 1997 the band released its self-titled debut EP on New Jersey independent label Now or Never Records, after which they were signed by Relapse Records who issued their second EP Under the Running Board in 1998. The EP charted on the UK Singles Chart, reaching number 194.

Following the addition of Brian Benoit to replace Fulton, The Dillinger Escape Plan released its debut full-length album Calculating Infinity in 1999. Jeff Wood played bass on the album's promotional tour, and was later replaced the following year by Liam Wilson. In 2001, Minakakis left the band and was not replaced for a number of months, during which time the remaining members performed a string of instrumental shows and recorded a number of tracks with vocalist Mike Patton of Faith No More and Mr. Bungle. The material was later issued in 2002 as the Irony Is a Dead Scene EP, which reached the top 20 of the US Billboard Independent Albums chart. Patton also performed on the band's recording of "Damaged, Parts I & II" for the Black Flag tribute album Black on Black: A Tribute to Black Flag.

Greg Puciato was enlisted as the replacement for Minakakis in late 2001. He made his recording debut for the band on 2004's Miss Machine, which charted for the first time on the US Billboard 200 when it reached number 106. Benoit left the band in April 2005 due to a nerve injury, and was replaced by James Love. Love was later replaced by Jeff Tuttle. Pennie also left in 2007, with Gil Sharone replacing him. Later in the year, the band released its third studio album Ire Works, which reached the top 150 of the album charts in the US and the UK. In early 2009, Billy Rymer replaced Sharone as the band's drummer. 2010's Option Paralysis, the band's first album to be released on their own label Party Smasher, reached number 78 on the Billboard 200 and number 107 on the UK Albums Chart.

In 2012, Tuttle left the band to attend film school. The band released its fifth album One of Us Is the Killer the following year, with the album charting in the US at number 25, in the UK at number 64, and in several other regions for the first time in the group's career. Love returned to the band in 2013, although was not featured on One of Us Is the Killer. After a brief hiatus during which Weinman focused on Giraffe Tongue Orchestra and Puciato on Killer Be Killed and The Black Queen, Love was replaced by Kevin Antreassian in 2015. The band released Dissociation in 2016, which was presented as the group's final album before embarking on an indefinite hiatus the following year. The album reached number 31 on the Billboard 200, number 47 on the UK Albums Chart, and number 80 on the Canadian Albums Chart.

== Albums ==
=== Studio albums ===
List of studio albums, with selected chart positions
| Title | Album details | Peak chart positions | | | | | | | | | | Sales |
| Title | Album details | US | AUS | AUT | CAN | FIN | FRA | GER | JPN | SWI | UK | Sales |
|---|---|---|---|---|---|---|---|---|---|---|---|---|
| Calculating Infinity | Released: September 28, 1999; Label: Relapse; Formats: CD, LP | — | — | — | — | — | — | — | — | — | — | Worldwide: 100,000 |
| Miss Machine | Released: July 20, 2004; Label: Relapse; Formats: CD, LP | 106 | — | — | — | — | 156 | — | 214 | — | 120 | |
| Ire Works | Released: November 13, 2007; Label: Relapse; Formats: CD, LP, digital download (DL) | 142 | — | — | — | — | 169 | — | 180 | — | 147 | |
| Option Paralysis | Released: March 23, 2010; Label: Party Smasher/Season of Mist; Formats: CD, LP, DL | 78 | 53 | — | — | 50 | — | — | — | — | 107 | |
| One of Us Is the Killer | Released: May 14, 2013; Label: Party Smasher/Sumerian; Formats: CD, LP, DL | 25 | 45 | 52 | — | 34 | 147 | 84 | 137 | 92 | 64 | |
| Dissociation | Released: October 14, 2016; Label: Party Smasher/Cooking Vinyl; Formats: CD, LP, DL | 31 | 14 | — | 80 | — | 177 | 100 | — | 60 | 47 | |

=== Live albums ===
| Title | Album details |
|---|---|
| Live Infinity | Released: November 29, 2019; Label: Relapse; Formats: LP, DL |

== Extended plays ==
=== Studio EPs ===
List of extended plays, with selected chart positions
| Title | EP details | Peak chart positions | | | |
| Title | EP details | US Heat. NE | US Indie | UK | UK Bud. |
|---|---|---|---|---|---|
| The Dillinger Escape Plan | Released: 1997; Label: Now or Never; Format: CD | — | — | — | — |
| Under the Running Board | Released: October 22, 1998; Label: Relapse; Formats: CD, 7-inch | — | — | 194 | — |
| Irony Is a Dead Scene (with Mike Patton) | Released: August 27, 2002; Label: Epitaph; Formats: CD, 12-inch | 4 | 19 | — | 19 |
| Plagiarism | Released: June 13, 2006; Label: Relapse; Format: DL | — | — | — | — |

=== Split EPs ===
List of split extended plays
| Title | EP details |
|---|---|
| Split with NORA | Released: May 20, 1999; Label: Ferret; Format: CD |
| Split with Drowningman | Released: 1999; Label: Hydra Head; Format: 7-inch |

=== Live EPs ===
List of live extended plays
| Title | EP details |
|---|---|
| Cursed, Unshaven and Misbehavin': Live Infinity | Released: January 3, 2003; Label: Relapse; Format: 7-inch |
| Live On The BBC 9.17.02 | Released: 2003; Label: none; Format: CDr |

== Singles ==
List of singles, showing year released and album name
| Title | Details | Album |
|---|---|---|
| "Panasonic Youth" | Released: June 21, 2004; Label: Relapse; Formats: CD | Miss Machine |
| "Setting Fire to Sleeping Giants" | Released: 2004; Label: Relapse; Formats: CD | Miss Machine |
| "Unretrofied" | Released: 2005; Label: Relapse; Formats: CD | Miss Machine |
| "Farewell, Mona Lisa" | Released: January 19, 2010; Label: Party Smasher/Season of Mist; Formats: DL | Option Paralysis |
| "Prancer" | Released: March 12, 2013; Label: Party Smasher/Sumerian; Formats: DL | One of Us Is the Killer |
| "Happiness Is a Smile" | Released: April, 2014; Label: Party Smasher; Formats: 7-inch, cassette | Non-album single |
| "Limerent Death" | Released: August 5, 2016; Label: Party Smasher/Cooking Vinyl; Formats: 7-inch, DL | Dissociation |
| "Symptom of a Terminal Illness" | Released: September 26, 2016; Label: Party Smasher/Cooking Vinyl; Formats: DL | Dissociation |
| "Instrumentalist" | Released: April 22, 2017; Label: Party Smasher; Formats: 7-inch | Non-album single |

== Video albums ==
List of video albums
| Title | Album details |
|---|---|
| Miss Machine: The DVD | Released: June 27, 2006; Label: Relapse; Format: DVD |

== Music videos ==
List of music videos, showing year released and director(s) name(s)
| Title | Year | Director(s) | Ref. |
|---|---|---|---|
| "The Mullet Burden" | 1998 | J.D. Panyko | |
| "Panasonic Youth" | 2004 | Josh Graham | |
| "Setting Fire to Sleeping Giants" | 2004 | Dale Resteghini | |
| "Unretrofied" | 2005 | Ilan Sharone | |
| "Milk Lizard" | 2007 | Ilan Sharone | |
| "Black Bubblegum" | 2007 | Ilan Sharone | |
| "Farewell, Mona Lisa" | 2010 | Cesar Ochoa | |
| "Gold Teeth on a Bum" | 2011 | Salvatore Perrone | |
| "Parasitic Twins" | 2012 | David Merenyi | |
| "When I Lost My Bet" | 2013 | Mitch Massie | |
| "One of Us Is The Killer" | 2013 | Mitch Massie | |
| "Hero of the Soviet Union" | 2013 | Ira Chernova | |
| "Happiness Is a Smile" | 2014 | Mitch Massie | |
| "Rage" (featuring Jarren Benton) | 2014 | Fredo Tovar, Scott Fleishman | |
| "Paranoia Shields" | 2015 | Mitch Massie | |
| "Limerent Death" | 2017 | Oleg Rooz | |

== Other appearances ==
List of other appearances, showing year released and album name
| Title | Year | Album | Ref. |
|---|---|---|---|
| "Damaged, Parts I & II" (Black Flag cover) | 2002 | Black on Black: A Tribute to Black Flag | |
| "Rebel Yell" (Billy Idol cover) | 2004 | Buddyhead Suicide | |
| "My Michelle" (Guns N' Roses cover) | 2004 | Bring You to Your Knees: A Tribute to Guns & Roses | |
| "Honey Bucket" (Melvins cover) | 2005 | We Reach: The Music of the Melvins | |
| "Fight the Power" (Public Enemy cover, featuring Chuck D) | 2011 | Homefront: Songs for the Resistance | |
| "Territorial Pissings" (Nirvana cover) | 2011 | Kerrang! Presents Nirvana Nevermind Forever | |
| "Rage" (featuring Jarren Benton) | 2014 | CONS EP Vol. 2 | |
