= Party Smasher Inc. discography =

The following is a list of releases by independent record label Party Smasher Inc. The label was founded by Ben Weinman of the Dillinger Escape Plan in 2009. In May 2016, Party Smasher partnered with Cooking Vinyl for global distribution, any release after this time was released in partnership with Party Smasher unless otherwise stated.

== Discography ==
Catalog	Artist	Album	Type	Release date	Note	Ref
	The Dillinger Escape Plan	Option Paralysis	Studio album	March 22, 2010	Released in partnership with Season of Mist	
	The Dillinger Escape Plan	One of Us Is the Killer	Studio album	May 14, 2013	Released in partnership with: BMG (Europe); Grind House (Japan); Remote Control (Australia); Sumerian Records (North America)	
	The Dillinger Escape Plan	"Happiness Is a Smile"	Single	April, 2014		
	No Machine	Volume One	EP	October 7, 2014	Released in partnership with Intheclouds Records	
	No Machine	Good News	Studio album	July 1, 2015	Released in partnership with Intheclouds Records	
PSI003	Primitive Weapons	The Future of Death	Studio album	April 15, 2016		
PSI004	Giraffe Tongue Orchestra	Broken Lines	Studio album	September 23, 2016		
PSI005	The Dillinger Escape Plan	Dissociation	Studio album	October 14, 2016		
PSI007	The Dillinger Escape Plan	"Limerent Death"	single			
PSI008	The Dillinger Escape Plan	Instrumentalist	7-inch	April 22, 2017		
	Seven)Suns	For the Hearts Still Beating	Studio album	June 23, 2017		
PSI009	God Mother	Vilseledd	Studio album	September 29, 2017		
	Actor / Observer	One Another	7-inch	November 17, 2017		
