= Cursed, Unshaven and Misbehavin': Live Infinity =

EP by The Dillinger Escape Plan
- Released: January 3, 2003
- Recorded: October 2000
- Length: 9:16
- Label: Relapse

The Dillinger Escape Plan chronology
Irony is a Dead Scene (2002)	Cursed, Unshaven and Misbehavin': Live Infinity (2003)	Miss Machine (2004)

Cursed, Unshaven and Misbehavin': Live Infinity is a live album by American mathcore band The Dillinger Escape Plan. It is a live album with songs from Under the Running Board and Calculating Infinity released on 7" vinyl. The album is a rarity and not often included in their discography. It was released on black, white, grey marble and possibly other colours of vinyl.

The songs were recorded in October 2000 "somewhere on tour with The Misfits" and were recorded on an ADAT machine. The songs were mixed by Chris Badami at Portrait Studios in Lincoln Park, NJ.

The vinyl is unique in the way it is played. "Jim Fear" begins like a normal track, but ends on a locked groove in the middle of the vinyl. "Destro's Secret" plays from the inside out and ends in the locked groove in the middle of the vinyl. "Sandbox Magician" begins like a normal 7", however "The Mullet Burden" begins slightly after the starting point for "Sandbox Magician". The EP comes with a sheet explaining the procedure required to listen to all of the tracks.

== Track listing ==
No.	Title	Length
1.	"Jim Fear"	2:55
2.	"Destro's Secret"	2:29
3.	"Sandbox Magician"	2:07
4.	"The Mullet Burden"	1:57

== Personnel ==
- Dimitri Minakakis – vocals
- Benjamin Weinman – lead guitar
- Brian Benoit – rhythm guitar
- Liam Wilson – bass
- Chris Pennie – drums

=== Production ===
- Chris Badami – mixing
- Orion Landau – sleeve design
