= Chris Pennie =

American drummer

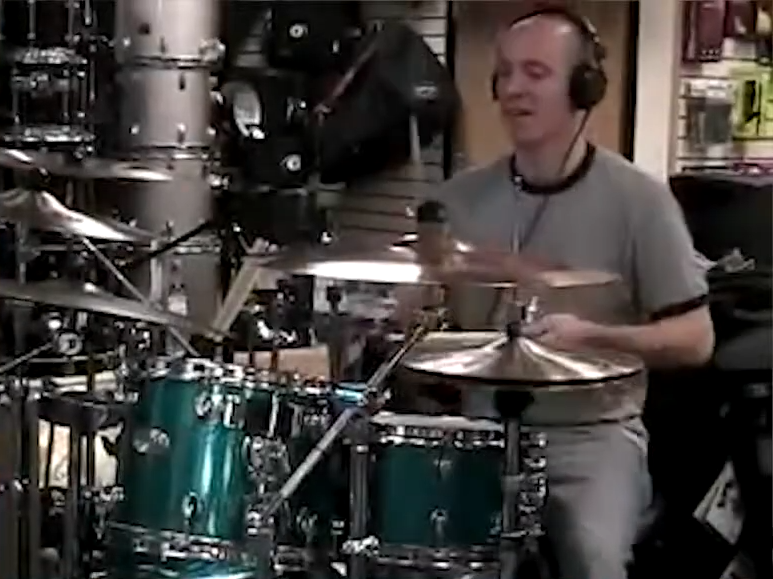
- Pennie in 2006

Background information
- Born: May 31, 1977 (age 47)
- Genres: Alternative rock, new prog, mathcore, post-hardcore
- Occupation: Musician
- Instruments: Drums; keyboards
- Years active: 1995–present

Chris Pennie (born May 31, 1977) is an American musician who is the former drummer for the progressive rock band Coheed and Cambria and former drummer and co-founder of mathcore band The Dillinger Escape Plan.

== Background ==
Pennie began playing drums at the age of 13, and at age 16 decided to pursue music seriously. He grew up in Randolph, New Jersey and graduated from Randolph High School, and spent two years at Berklee College of Music where he received a diploma in Music Synthesis, which focuses on electronic music composition and manipulation.

== Influences and legacy ==
Pennie has cited drummers Lars Ulrich and Stewart Copeland as his main early influences. In regard to his current playing, Sean Reinert is one of his biggest inspirations. He has also emphasized on several occasions that listening to and playing a diverse assortment of music has been an integral part in developing his style, noting such eclectic influences as 1970s jazz-rock fusion group Mahavishnu Orchestra, technical metal bands Meshuggah, Cynic, and electronic-influenced groups such as Nine Inch Nails and DJ Shadow.

Many drummers have cited Pennie as an influence or expressed admiration for his work, including Brann Dailor, Richard Christy of Death, Peter Wildoer, Dave Witte, Tyshawn Sorey, Charlie Zeleny, Dan Searle of Architects, Andy Dalton of See You Next Tuesday, J. R. Conners of Cave In, Craig Reynolds of Stray from the Path, Jean-François Richard of Ion Dissonance, Andrew McEnaney of Structures, Tobias Persson of Visceral Bleeding, Stephen Carr of Exotic Animal Petting Zoo, Stefano Ghigliano of Stigma, Danny Grossarth of Candiria, Eric Schnee of Paria, Darren Pugh of Collibus, Eli Litwin of John Frum, Chris Golding of Sulaco and Corey Melom of The Crinn.

== Bands ==
While in high school he was playing in the local New Jersey–based band, Prozak. The other three members of Prozak were 8–10 years Pennie's senior, and in order for Prozak to play the local bars and clubs, Pennie's father would accompany him to their gigs. Pennie played with Prozak from 1993 until he began attending Berklee School of Music in 1995. He recorded ten songs with Prozak during his time with the band but they were never commercially released.

Pennie also spent time with the pop-punk group Boxer. Formed in 1995 with another Berklee graduate, Jeremy McDowell, they became the first band to be signed to the now famous Vagrant Records. They released one album, The Hurt Process, in 1998, and broke up in late 1999. Pennie also recorded drums for his former tourmates in experimental metalcore group All Else Failed on their 2004 album This Never Happened.

He and guitarist Ben Weinman, along with singer Dimitri Minakakis and bass guitarist Adam Doll, formed Dillinger Escape Plan in March 1997. He and Weinman wrote the majority of the band's material and Pennie called Weinman his "musical soulmate". Pennie also took care of a lot of the electronic influence in the band's material in the studio as well as onstage, triggering effects and loops with footswitch pedals.

Pennie began working in the studio with rock band Coheed and Cambria, after drummer Josh Eppard had left the band. Due to contractual obligations, Pennie was not allowed to record for Coheed's 2007 album Good Apollo, I'm Burning Star IV, Volume Two: No World for Tomorrow. Instead, the band recruited Foo Fighters drummer Taylor Hawkins for the task. On June 28, 2007, Coheed and Cambria announced on their Myspace that Pennie joined the band.

On November 2, 2011, Coheed and Cambria announced on their Facebook page that Pennie had left the band. Pennie also announced he had parted ways with Coheed and Cambria, in order to focus on other projects such as Return to Earth and Fight Mannequins.

== Other projects ==
Pennie lent his talent to the predominantly electronic band Idiot Pilot on their 2007 album Wolves. MTV reported: "the Dillinger Escape Plan's Chris Pennie appears on the album, augmenting several of Wolves' tracks with his drumming prowess. Anderson said the one-two punches of Hoppus, Robinson, Barker, and Pennie are bringing something new to Idiot Pilot's established sound."

== Equipment ==
Drums (Mapex Saturn Series in Black Cherry Sparkle finish):

- 20-inch × 22-inch bass drum
- 9-inch × 12-inch rack tom
- 16-inch × 16-inch floor tom
- 7-inch × 14-inch Mapex snare drum

Cymbals (Sabian):

- 14-inch HHX Groove hats
- 18-inch HHXplosion crash
- 19-inch HHXplosion crash
- 21-inch HH Raw Bell dry ride
- 19-inch Paragon Chinese

Sticks (Vater):

- Vater Xtreme Design 5B

Bass Pedals (Mapex):

- Mapex Falcon double bass pedal

== Discography ==
=== With Dillinger Escape Plan ===
- 1997: The Dillinger Escape Plan
- 1998: Under the Running Board
- 1998: Split with Nora
- 1999: Split with Drowningman
- 1999: Calculating Infinity
- 2002: Irony Is A Dead Scene
- 2002: Black on Black: A Tribute to Black Flag – cover of "Damaged, Pt.s I & II"
- 2003: Cursed, Unshaven and Misbehavin': Live Infinity
- 2004: Bring You to Your Knees: A Tribute To Guns 'N Roses – cover of "My Michelle"
- 2004: Miss Machine
- 2005: We Reach: The Music of the Melvins – cover of "Honeybucket"
- 2006: Plagiarism
- 2019: Live Infinity

=== With Coheed and Cambria ===
- 2008: Kerrang – Maiden Heaven (Iron Maiden tribute record) – "The Trooper"
- 2009: Neverender: Children of The Fence Edition
- 2010: Year of the Black Rainbow

=== With Return to Earth ===
- 2007: Captains of Industry
- 2010: Automata
- 2022: Oblivion

=== Others ===
- 1998: Boxer – The Hurt Process
- 2005: Getaway Car – "Getaway Car" Mass Appeal
- 2004: All Else Failed – This Never Happened
- 2007: Idiot Pilot – Wolves
- 2010: The Armed – Common Enemies
- 2010: New World Man – A Tribute to Rush
- 2011: The Armed – Young & Beautiful
- 2012: The Armed – Spreading Joy
- 2016: Joseph A. Peragine – Diagnosis: Schizophrenia
- 2018: Joseph A. Peragine – Vol.2 (Diagnosis: Schizophrenia)
- 2018: Joseph A. Peragine – Vol.3 (Diagnosis: Schizophrenia)
- 2018: Joseph A. Peragine – Vol.4 (Diagnosis: Schizophrenia)
- 2020: Greg Puciato – Child Soldier: Creator of God (provided drums on "Creator of God" and "Fire For Water")
- 2023: Joseph A. Peragine – Mantra
- 2024: Joseph A. Peragine - Epithet
