= Under the Running Board =

EP by The Dillinger Escape Plan
- Released: October 22, 1998; October 14, 2008 (Reissue)
- Recorded: December 1997 at Trax East
- Genres: Mathcore; metalcore; grindcore
- Length: 7:33
- Label: Relapse
- Producer: Steve Evetts

The Dillinger Escape Plan chronology
The Dillinger Escape Plan (1997)	Under the Running Board (1998)	Calculating Infinity (1999)

Professional ratings
Review scores
Source	Rating
AllMusic	3/5 stars

Under the Running Board is an EP by American mathcore band the Dillinger Escape Plan, released on October 22, 1998. The album shows a more experimental side, which would later be more developed on Calculating Infinity. This is also the band's first release on Relapse Records. The song "Abe the Cop" would later be performed and recorded on their self-titled EP's re-release in 2000.

== Reissue ==
Almost 10 years to the day of its original release, Under the Running Board was re-released by Relapse Records. The reissue contains the original three tracks plus 10 bonus tracks.

== Track listing ==
No.	Title	Length
1.	"The Mullet Burden"	1:50
2.	"Sandbox Magician"	2:31
3.	"Abe the Cop"	3:12

Reissue bonus tracks
No.	Title	Length
4.	"Sandbox Magician" (live)	2:06
5.	"Jim Fear" (live)	2:55
6.	"Destro's Secret" (live)	2:30
7.	"Clip the Apex...Accept Instruction" (live)	4:49
8.	"43% Burnt" (live)	3:51
9.	"The Mullet Burden" (live)	1:56
10.	"Sugar Coated Sour" (live)	3:32
11.	"The Running Board" (live)	3:14
12.	"Abe the Cop" (live)	4:52
13.	"Paranoid" (Black Sabbath cover)	3:44

== Personnel ==
- Dimitri Minakakis – lead vocals
- Ben Weinman – lead guitar, backing vocals
- Chris Pennie – drums
- John Fulton – rhythm guitar
- Adam Doll – bass
- Liam Wilson – bass (reissue bonus tracks)
- Brian Benoit – rhythm guitar (reissue bonus tracks 4–12)

=== Additional personnel ===
- Alan Douches – mastering
- Steve Evetts – production, engineering
- Adam Peterson – graphic design
