= Plagiarism (EP) =

EP by The Dillinger Escape Plan
- Released: June 13, 2006
- Length: 28:48
- Label: Relapse

The Dillinger Escape Plan chronology
Miss Machine (2004)	Plagiarism (2006)	Ire Works (2007)

Plagiarism is an EP by American mathcore band The Dillinger Escape Plan, released on the iTunes Music Store on June 13, 2006.

The title is a reference to the fact that four of the EP's six tracks are covers faithful to the original songs. "Like I Love You" was first performed with Mike Patton on New Year's Eve 2002. The version on the EP, however, is a studio version with Greg Puciato on vocals. "Wish" has been performed occasionally by the band, and the band was asked to join Nine Inch Nails to perform the track during two shows of the 2009 Soundwave Festival, as well as during the final performance of the Wave Goodbye Tour on September 10, 2009, at the Wiltern Theatre.

== Track listing ==
No.	Title	Length
1.	"Unretrofied" (Radio edit)	4:03
2.	"Wish" (Nine Inch Nails cover)	3:36
3.	"Angel" (Massive Attack cover)	6:15
4.	"Jesus Christ Pose" (Soundgarden cover)	5:48
5.	"Like I Love You" (Justin Timberlake cover)	5:07
6.	"The Perfect Design" (Live)	3:56

== Personnel ==
- Greg Puciato – vocals
- Ben Weinman – lead guitar, keyboards, producer, engineer
- James Love – rhythm guitar (Brian Benoit appears on the cover because it is an older picture from the Miss Machine era)
- Liam Wilson – bass
- Chris Pennie – percussion, drums, keyboards
