= Ire Works =

Studio album by the Dillinger Escape Plan
- Released: November 5, 2007
- Recorded: 2007
- Genres: Mathcore; metalcore; post-hardcore
- Length: 38:26
- Label: Relapse
- Producer: Steve Evetts

The Dillinger Escape Plan chronology
Plagiarism (2006)	Ire Works (2007)	Option Paralysis (2010)

Ire Works is the third studio album by American band the Dillinger Escape Plan. The album was released in the UK on November 5, 2007, in the US on November 13 through Relapse Records, and in Japan on November 28. The album was their last album on Relapse. The album is Gil Sharone's only album with the band and their first without founding drummer Chris Pennie. Lead guitarist Ben Weinman plays guitar alone on the record, due to Brian Benoit's injury. The album is described as mathcore, post-hardcore, and metalcore, incorporating a wide variety of influences including electronic music.

According to an interview in Terrorizer magazine, this is their last album on the Relapse Records label. The album was critically successful, debuting on the Billboard 200 at number 142 with 7,000 copies scanned, but was later corrected when it was revealed that Relapse somehow forgot to scan the pre-release album sales, which made the first week total actually around 11,000. The album features guest vocals by band's former vocalist Dimitri Minakakis (on "Fix Your Face") and Mastodon's Brent Hinds (on "Horse Hunter").

== Background ==
After a successful reception and tour to Miss Machine, the band began recording new material. However, drummer Chris Pennie left the band to join Coheed and Cambria as the band's permanent drummer after the departure of their former drummer. Shortly after, new drummer Gil Sharone was hired by Dillinger and performed the drum tracks on the album.

During the Miss Machine tours, guitarist Brian Benoit developed nerve damage in his left hand and was forced to quit the band. Instead of hiring a new guitarist, Ben Weinman played all of the album's guitar tracks. Jeff Tuttle was later hired as the band's touring guitarist. Once again, the band hired metalcore producer Steve Evetts. Former vocalist Dimitri Minakakis makes guest vocals on the track "Fix Your Face", and has appeared on stage with the band many times.

The artwork was created by Shelby Cinca of Frodus and Decahedron. He was chosen by the band for his sci-fi/futurist-influenced visual sensibilities. The artwork is also a subtle reference to Bloom's Taxonomy of Learning, as a URL pointing to "ireworks.net" is written in small, almost hidden text on the album's official lyric sheet. The triangle on the album contains the same basic colors shown on the Bloom's Taxonomy of Learning pyramid, though the actual artwork uses gradients versus having different levels of shading.

The song "Milk Lizard" can be heard on the radio station Krunch 106.66 in the video game Saints Row 2.

== Critical reception ==
Professional ratings
Aggregate scores
Source	Rating
Metacritic	84/100
Review scores
Source	Rating
AllMusic	4.5/5 stars
The A.V. Club	A−
Chronicles of Chaos	9/10
Decibel	9/10
Drowned in Sound	8/10
Kerrang!	5/5 stars
NME	3/5 stars
Pitchfork	8.0/10
PopMatters	9/10

Ire Works was released to critical acclaim. In the January 2008 issue of Revolver they counted down the top 20 albums of 2007 with Ire Works at number two, right behind Baroness's Red Album and before High on Fire's Death Is This Communion. It gained the same spot in Kerrang! magazine's Top 20 albums of 2007, before Machine Head's The Blackening and behind Biffy Clyro's Puzzle. It was ranked number 3, below Watain's Sworn to the Dark and Pig Destroyer's Phantom Limb, in Decibel's Top 40 Albums of 2007. Mike Portnoy named this album one of his favorite albums of 2007 on his official web page.

== Track listing ==
All tracks are written by Ben Weinman and Greg Puciato.

No.	Title	Length
1.	"Fix Your Face"	2:41
2.	"Lurch"	2:03
3.	"Black Bubblegum"	4:04
4.	"Sick on Sunday"	2:10
5.	"When Acting as a Particle" ( (Note: On streaming services, track 5 is spelled as "Whan Acting As A Particle".))	1:23
6.	"Nong Eye Gong"	1:16
7.	"When Acting as a Wave"	1:33
8.	"82588"	1:56
9.	"Milk Lizard"	3:55
10.	"Party Smasher"	1:56
11.	"Dead as History"	5:29
12.	"Horse Hunter"	3:11
13.	"Mouth of Ghosts"	6:49

Japanese bonus track
No.	Title	Length
14.	"The Perfect Design" (live)	3:57

The live version of "The Perfect Design" previously appeared on the Plagiarism EP.

== Personnel ==
- Greg Puciato – lead vocals
- Ben Weinman – guitars, backing vocals, piano, programming
- Liam Wilson – bass
- Gil Sharone – drums, percussion

=== Additional personnel ===
- Ben Weinman – production, sound design
- Dimitri Minakakis – additional vocals on "Fix Your Face"
- Brent Hinds – additional vocals on "Horse Hunter"
- Steve Evetts – production
- Steve Ryan – additional/assistant engineering
- Alan Douches – mastering
- Shelby Cinca – graphic design
- Craig Demel – violin
- Robin Reynolds – cello
- Phill Williams – percussion
- Ali Tabatabai – percussion, saw
- Matt Lupo – trumpet

== Charts ==
Chart (2007)	Peak position
French Albums (SNEP)	169
UK Albums (OCC)	147
US Billboard 200	142
US Top Hard Rock Albums (Billboard)	17
