= Option Paralysis =

Studio album by The Dillinger Escape Plan
- Released: March 23, 2010
- Recorded: September 8 − November 12, 2009
- Genres: Mathcore; post-hardcore
- Length: 41:28
- Labels: Party Smasher; Season of Mist
- Producers: Benjamin Weinman; Steve Evetts

The Dillinger Escape Plan chronology
Ire Works (2007)	Option Paralysis (2010)	One of Us Is the Killer (2013)

Singles from Option Paralysis
- 1. "Farewell, Mona Lisa" Released: January 19, 2010

Alternative covers
- Cover for the vinyl version of Option Paralysis.

Alternative cover
- Cover for the digipak version of Option Paralysis.

Option Paralysis is the fourth studio album by American mathcore band The Dillinger Escape Plan, released on March 23, 2010. After having fulfilled their contract with Relapse Records, the band released the album through Party Smasher Inc., their own new imprint in collaboration with French record label Season of Mist. It marks The Dillinger Escape Plan's first release to feature Billy Rymer on drums, since Gil Sharone left the band in September 2008 due to the frequent touring schedule and to focus on his brother's band Stolen Babies.

Option Paralysis debuted at number 78 on the Billboard 200 with 7,100 units sold.

== Background ==
=== Formation of Party Smasher Inc. ===
The Dillinger Escape Plan announced their departure from Relapse Records in 2009. They had become dissatisfied with the music industry and music media, and decided to create their own record label to release their fourth studio album. The band created their own imprint Party Smasher Inc. under French label Season of Mist. They stated that Party Smasher (which was originally erroneously reported to be called Photogenic Records) is not technically a record label but a "creative umbrella" for all things related to The Dillinger Escape Plan. In an interview with Alternative Press, Weinman stated, "Well, I should clarify that it's not exactly our attempt to run a record label. That's not something we could be good at, and it's obviously not something anybody's good at these days. [Laughs] It's more a situation where we now have a name for this umbrella that covers every business and artistic decision we make - whether it's Dillinger, side-projects or whatever".

=== Recording ===
In a blog on the band's MySpace profile, vocalist Greg Puciato revealed that they would be entering the studio from September 7 - October 30, 2009 to record Option Paralysis with longtime collaborator Steve Evetts. The band focused on these sessions more than in previous albums and the members stayed on the studio from noon to night or more, for three months. Puciato described the process as overwhelming but necessary: "We really went as far as we could making sure that every little thing was exactly the way we wanted. How many records are you gonna be able to do in your life? It’s the one thing you can look back on and either say, 'Fuck, I wish we did that differently' or 'We did that exactly the way we were going to'. You're going to die with nothing, man. This is going to outlive any of us, hopefully". Eventually, the recording lasted until November 12, 2009.

The album is their second longest yet at over 41 minutes, behind Dissociation, and was described by Ben Weinman as "our most metal record yet".

=== Title and lyrics ===
The title Option Paralysis is a concept referring to an individual "paralyzed" by an overload of options. Ben Weinman cited this as a general concern of the band, whose members grew up in underground scenes but by the time of the album were witnessing young people absorbed in modern technology, which they believe homogenized culture and caused "[almost a] cultural depression".

During the writing process, Puciato was going through personal issues, and described Option Paralysis as one of the toughest and the most honest album he made thus far. The singer was immersed in absurdist philosophy at the time, reading authors such as Søren Kierkegaard and particularly Albert Camus' work, including The Stranger, The Plague, Exile and the Kingdom and The Myth of Sisyphus. The lyrics were composed in free association and Puciato believes that they unearthed subconscious issues he had, but chose to keep them private.

"Room Full of Eyes" was named for the 1995 song "1,000 Eyes" by Death.

== Promotion ==
The band released several demo snippets on their YouTube channel. Furthermore, a website for the record was set up, linking to all of the studio update videos and demo snippets. During their North American East Coast tour with Thursday in December 2009, the band sold download cards at their shows that entitled the customer to a download of the 10 song album upon its release with 3 additional exclusive bonus tracks.

The song "Farewell, Mona Lisa", debuted on Liquid Metal SXM on Christmas Day, 2009; it became available for download on January 19, 2010. "Chinese Whispers" was debuted on Full Metal Jackie's syndicated radio show broadcast on 29 stations throughout the USA on the March 5, 2010, and was subsequently played on the next two days. On March 9, the blog MetalSucks featured the online debut of the song.

In February, the album was made available for pre-orders through the Season of Mist e-shop. It was available in a variety of formats, including a box set, Digipak, black vinyl and transparent vinyl. A white vinyl was later made available through Relapse Records.

== Artwork ==
Former frontman Dimitri Minakakis (who also contributed artwork for 2004 album Miss Machine) created the artwork for Option Paralysis. In an interview, Jeff Tuttle revealed that the album cover features photographs and images that the members captured themselves.

== Reception ==
Professional ratings
Aggregate scores
Source	Rating
Metacritic	82/100
Review scores
Source	Rating
AllMusic	4/5 stars
Alternative Press	4.5/5 stars
The A.V. Club	A−
Decibel	8/10
Pitchfork	7.2/10
Revolver	4/5 stars
Rock Sound	9/10
Slant Magazine	4/5 stars
Spin	3.5/5 stars
Sputnikmusic	4.5/5

Option Paralysis was released to overall critical acclaim. The album garnered a rating of 82/100, or universal acclaim, on aggregate review site Metacritic.

Exclaim! named Option Paralysis the No. 2 Metal Album of 2010.

=== Public reception ===
Option Paralysis was very well received by the public. On Rate Your Music the album has an average rating of 3.44 of 5, based on more than 1,750 ratings, and on Sputnikmusic the album has an "excellent" average rating of 4.1 of 5, based on more than 2,400 ratings. The album is #19 on the list "Best Albums of 2010" on Sputnikmusic.

Option Paralysis received the highest percentage of #1 votes in the 2010 Pitchfork Readers' Poll.

== Track listing ==
All lyrics are written by Greg Puciato except "Parasitic Twins" by Jeff Tuttle; all music is composed by Ben Weinman.

No.	Title	Length
1.	"Farewell, Mona Lisa"	5:23
2.	"Good Neighbor"	2:30
3.	"Gold Teeth on a Bum"	5:22
4.	"Crystal Morning"	2:02
5.	"Endless Endings"	2:32
6.	"Widower"	6:23
7.	"Room Full of Eyes"	4:15
8.	"Chinese Whispers"	4:06
9.	"I Wouldn't If You Didn't"	4:14
10.	"Parasitic Twins"	4:41
Total length:		41:28

Vinyl and Japanese bonus track
No.	Title	Length
11.	"Chuck McChip"	2:24
Total length:		43:52

iTunes bonus track
No.	Title	Length
11.	"Farewell, Mona Lisa" (demo version)	4:57

Amazon bonus track
No.	Title	Length
11.	"Endless Endings" (demo version)	2:45

Box set and digipak bonus track
No.	Title	Length
11.	"Heat Deaf Melted Grill"	2:53

Paralyzing Edition
No.	Title	Length
11.	"Heat Deaf Melted Grill"	2:52
12.	"Chuck McChip"	2:23
13.	"Farewell, Mona Lisa" (Demo Version)	4:56
14.	"Endless Endings" (Demo Version)	2:45
15.	"Parasitic Twins" (Instrumental Version)	4:41

== Personnel ==
The Dillinger Escape Plan

- Greg Puciato – lead vocals
- Liam Wilson – bass
- Billy Rymer – drums
- Benjamin Weinman – guitars, piano, sound design, programming, backing vocals
- Jeff Tuttle – additional vocals on "Good Neighbor", "Gold Teeth on a Bum", "Crystal Morning" and "Parasitic Twins"

Guest musicians

- Mike Garson – additional piano on "Widower" and "I Wouldn't If You Didn't"

Technical

- Benjamin Weinman – production, sound design
- Steve Evetts – production, engineering, mixing
- Allan Hessler – assistant engineering
- Alan Douches – mastering

Other

- Dimitri Minakakis (Pronto Workshop) – artwork
- Benjamin Weinman – management
- Jim Morewood (English Gent Organization) – International booking
- Justin Hirschman (Artist Group International) – North American booking
- Ian J. Friedman, Esq. – legal

== Charts ==
Chart (2010)	Peak position
Australian Albums (ARIA)	53
Finnish Albums (Suomen virallinen lista)	50
UK Albums (Official Charts)	107
UK Rock & Metal Albums (Official Charts)	6
US Billboard 200	78
US Independent Albums (Billboard)	9
US Top Hard Rock Albums (Billboard)	5
US Top Rock Albums (Billboard)	23
US Indie Store Album Sales (Billboard)	8
