= Irony Is a Dead Scene =

EP by The Dillinger Escape Plan with Mike Patton
- Released: August 27, 2002
- Studio: Portrait Recording (Lincoln Park, New Jersey)
- Genres: Mathcore; metalcore; avant-garde metal; grindcore
- Length: 17:57
- Labels: Epitaph; Buddyhead
- Producers: Ben Weinman; Mike Patton; Chris Pennie

The Dillinger Escape Plan chronology
Calculating Infinity (1999)	Irony Is a Dead Scene (2002)	Miss Machine (2004)

Mike Patton chronology
Pranzo Oltranzista (1997)	Irony is a Dead Scene (2002)	A Perfect Place (2008)

Irony Is a Dead Scene is the third EP by the American metalcore band The Dillinger Escape Plan. Recorded with Mike Patton on vocals, the EP was released on August 27, 2002, by Epitaph and Buddyhead Records.

== Background ==
Following the departure of the band's original vocalist Dimitri Minakakis, the temporary plan to record with Patton was in place before a permanent replacement vocalist had been found, yet by the time Patton had recorded vocals and the EP was released, the band had been touring with new vocalist Greg Puciato for nearly a year.

== Reception ==
Professional ratings
Review scores
Source	Rating
AllMusic	4/5 stars
Drowned in Sound	9/10
Music Emissions	4.5/5 stars
Pitchfork	8.4/10
Slant Magazine	5/5 stars

Irony Is a Dead Scene was generally reviewed well, and Patton's contributions to the band's sound was considered a successful experiment. Bradley Torreano of AllMusic gave the album 4 out of 5 stars, saying, "Despite the ridiculously high expectations from both artists' fan bases, Irony Is a Dead Scene is a brilliant collaboration between the two."

== Track listing ==
All tracks are written by The Dillinger Escape Plan and Mike Patton except where noted. Actual writers below, according to ASCAP.

No.	Title	Writer(s)	Length
1.	"Hollywood Squares"	Patton; Chris Pennie; Ben Weinman	4:06
2.	"Pig Latin"	Patton; Pennie; Weinman; Adam Doll	3:31
3.	"When Good Dogs Do Bad Things"	Patton; Weinman	5:59
4.	"Come to Daddy" (Aphex Twin cover)	Richard D. James	4:21
Total length:			17:57

== Personnel ==
The Dillinger Escape Plan

- Ben Weinman – lead guitar, keyboards
- Brian Benoit – rhythm guitar
- Liam Wilson – bass
- Adam Doll – keyboards, samples
- Chris Pennie – drums, percussion, keyboards

Guest musician

- Mike Patton – vocals, sampler, percussion

Production

- Ben Weinman – production
- Chris Pennie – production
- Mike Patton – production
- Chris Badami – engineering
- Steve Evetts – mixing
- Alan Douches – mastering
- Nick Pritchard – design
