= The Crinn =

American mathcore band

- Origin: Saint Paul, Minnesota, U.S.
- Genres: Mathcore
- Years active: 2005–present
- Labels: Nuclear Blast; Corrosive
- Members: Cole Leonard; Chad White; Chris Zugschwert; John Nelson
- Past members: Corey Melom; Jon Peterson

The Crinn is an American mathcore band from Saint Paul, Minnesota, United States, formed in 2005. On April 20, 2010, they released their debut album Dreaming Saturn through Nuclear Blast records.

== Discography ==
- Kills Curiosity (EP) (Self Released, 2006)
- Self Titled (EP) (Corrosive, 2007)
- Dreaming Saturn (Nuclear Blast, 2010)
- Shadowbreather (Self-released, 2015)
