= The Dillinger Escape Plan (EP) =

EP by The Dillinger Escape Plan
- Released: 1997; June 13, 2000 (Now or Never re-release); March 25, 2002 (Earache reissue)
- Recorded: April 1997
- Genres: Mathcore, metalcore, experimental rock
- Length: 15:21 (original); 27:04 (with live tracks)
- Label: Now or Never
- Producer: Steve Evetts

The Dillinger Escape Plan chronology
The Dillinger Escape Plan (1997)	Under the Running Board (1998)

Alternative cover
- Re-release cover

Professional ratings
Review scores
Source	Rating
AllMusic	3/5 stars

The Dillinger Escape Plan is the debut EP by American mathcore band The Dillinger Escape Plan, originally released in 1997 and rereleased by Now or Never Records as NoN.02. Some point between the original pressing and the 2000 reissue, it was repressed with different artwork. The repress (likely repressed in 1998) contains an additional keyboard credit for Steve Evetts, as well as correcting the spelling of his name which was misspelled (as Steve Evets) on the original pressing. The original also has the words "It's OK. We'll Just Kill Her Too" on the cover/spine which does not appear on the repress.

In 2000 Now or Never Records reissued the EP with three additional live tracks and new artwork. On March 25, 2002, Earache released the original EP without the live tracks, but with the new artwork.

== Track listing ==
No.	Title	Length
1.	"Proceed with Caution"	1:02
2.	"I Love Secret Agents"	2:10
3.	"Monticello"	3:04
4.	"Cleopatra's Sling"	3:12
5.	"Caffeine"	2:49
6.	"Three for Flinching (Revenge of the Porno Clowns)"	3:04

Reissue bonus tracks
No.	Title	Length
7.	"Sugar Coated Sour" (live)	3:34
8.	"Abe the Cop" (live)	4:54
9.	"The Running Board" (live)	3:15

== Personnel ==
- Dimitri Minakakis – vocals
- Ben Weinman – guitars, keyboards
- Adam Doll – bass
- Chris Pennie – drums, keyboards

=== Addition personnel ===
- Mathew "Matty B" Beckerman – executive production
- Steve Evetts – production, engineering
- Aaron Turner – artwork, design
