= Giraffe Tongue Orchestra =

American rock supergroup

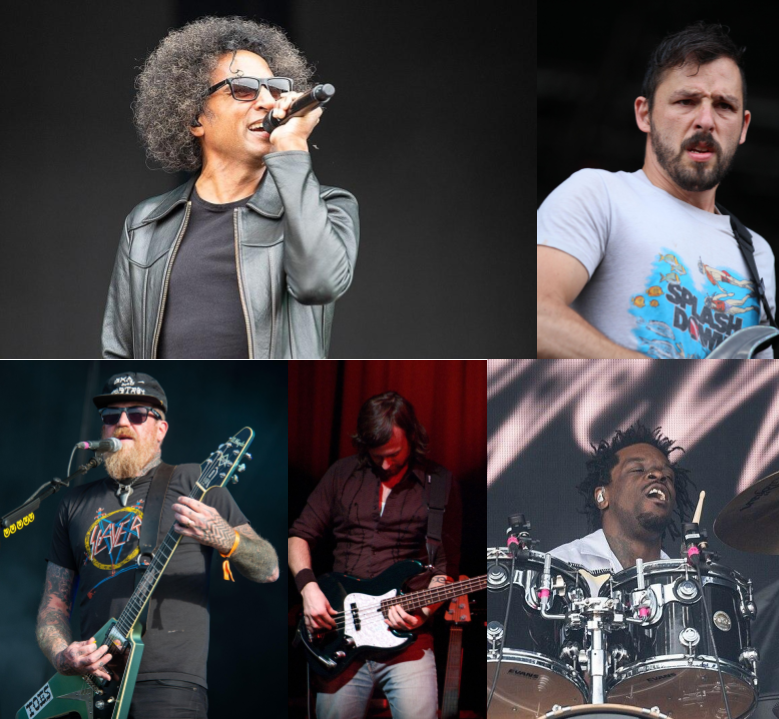
- Members of Giraffe Tongue Orchestra

Background information
- Genres: Alternative metal; hard rock; progressive metal
- Years active: 2012–present
- Label: Party Smasher
- Members: William DuVall; Ben Weinman; Thomas Pridgen; Pete Griffin
- Past members: Juliette Lewis; Eric Avery; Jon Theodore; Brent Hinds
- Website: giraffetongueorchestra.com

Giraffe Tongue Orchestra is an American rock supergroup. It consists of Alice in Chains vocalist William DuVall, lead guitarist Ben Weinman of the Dillinger Escape Plan, drummer Thomas Pridgen of the Mars Volta, and bassist Pete Griffin of Dethklok and Zappa Plays Zappa. The band released their debut LP, Broken Lines, on September 23, 2016.

== History ==
The band was founded in 2012 by Ben Weinman. At one point actress and singer Juliette Lewis fronted it, and at another time featured guitarist Brent Hinds, formerly of Mastodon, Eric Avery on bass and Jon Theodore on drums. According to Weinman, Lewis never officially was the singer, but only added some vocal lines. The ten songs of the debut album Broken Lines had been written before DuVall came into the band. The group was called "a real democracy" by Weinman. On the song "Back to the Light" a vocal cameo of Lewis can be heard. The band had its first live appearances at Reading and Leeds Festivals on August 27 and 28, 2016.

Guitarist Brent Hinds died on August 20, 2025, in a traffic collision.

== Band members ==
Current members

- William DuVall - vocals
- Ben Weinman - guitar, keyboards
- Pete Griffin - bass guitar
- Thomas Pridgen - drums, percussion

Past members

- Juliette Lewis - vocals
- Eric Avery - bass guitar
- Jon Theodore - drums, percussion
- Brent Hinds - guitar, backing vocals (died 2025)

== Discography ==
Title	Album details	Peak chart positions				
Title	Album details	U.S.	U.S. Heat	U.S. Indie	U.S. Rock	U.S. Hard Rock
Broken Lines	Release: September 23, 2016; Label: Party Smasher; Format: CD, DL, LP	85	3	23	29	7
