= Jeff Tuttle =

American musician and filmmaker

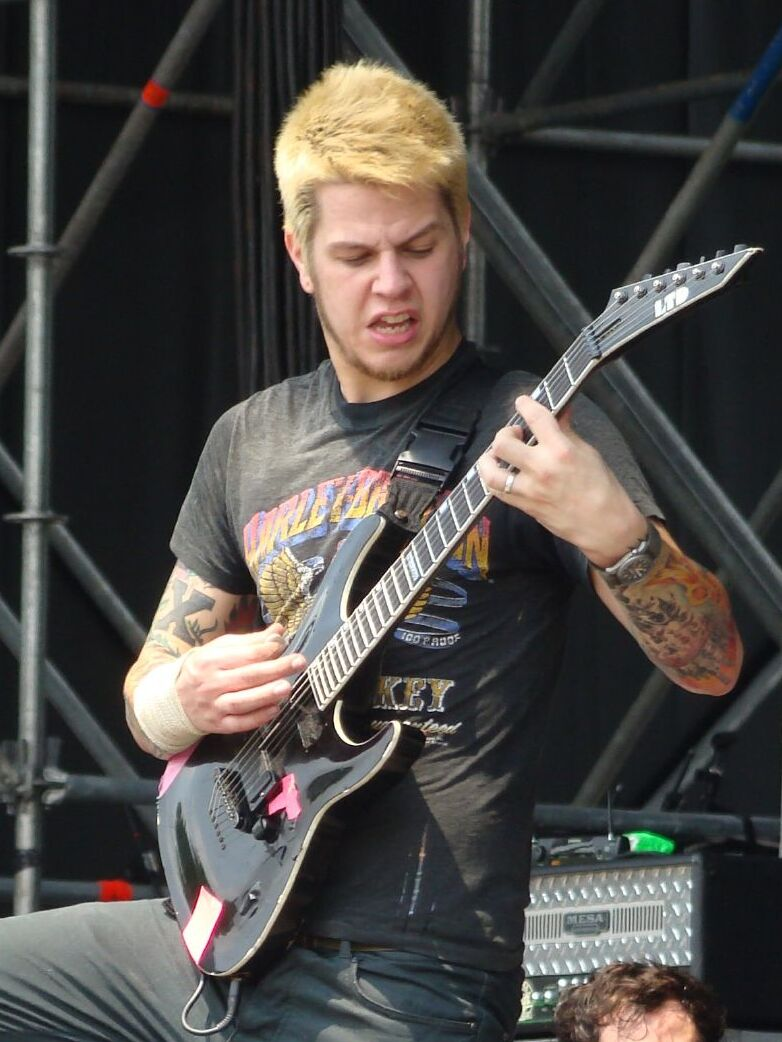
- Tuttle performing in 2008

Background information
- Birth name: Jeff Tuttle
- Origin: Detroit, Michigan, United States
- Genres: Hardcore punk; mathcore; metalcore; post-hardcore
- Instrument(s): Guitar, vocals

Jeff Tuttle is an American musician and filmmaker, best known as the former guitarist and backing vocalist of the mathcore band The Dillinger Escape Plan, for which he played from 2007 to 2012. He is noted for his energetic live performances.

== Biography ==
Jeff Tuttle grew up in Flat Rock, Michigan and started going to punk shows in the mid-1990s. He played in several bands, including Capture the Flag (Go Kart, Conquer the World, Happy Guy Records), Hyatt, Holocaust and Heads Will Roll, with whom he toured along with The Dillinger Escape Plan.

In Summer 2007, following the departure of guitarist James Love from The Dillinger Escape Plan, Jeff Tuttle was the first person contacted by the band to fill-in because its bandleader Ben Weinman was "impressed with his drive" and work ethic since he toured with him. He first contributed to their 2010 album Option Paralysis, helping to co-write and perform the vocals to "Parasitic Twins", as well as providing backing vocals throughout the album. However, he did not play guitars. On August 17, 2012, The Dillinger Escape Plan announced Jeff Tuttle's departure from the band on good terms in order to focus on film school and his other bands. Tuttle played PRS guitars onstage, as well as Mesa and Orange amplifiers.

Tuttle has made regular cameos in the web-based cooking show Solid Dudes Kitchen, created by his former bandmates in Heads Will Roll, Dave Graw and Derek Swanson. In season one he appeared in the Mac and Cheese episode, and in season two he appeared in the Dia de Los Muertos episode, answering questions with subtitled guitar riffs in both episodes.

In 2011, he founded the post-hardcore band Old Gods along with members of The Armed and Heads Will Roll, with him performing as the vocalist. They signed to No Rest Until Ruin Records.

== Personal life ==
Jeff Tuttle is married. He follows a straight edge lifestyle.

== Discography ==
Heads Will Roll

- Information As Terminal Disease (2002)
- Extrapolate the Meaning (2004)
- Heads Will Roll EP (2006)

Capture the Flag

- Time And Again (1999)
- Walking Away From Everything (2001)
- Start From Scratch (2003)

Hyatt

- Demo (1999)

Holocaust

The Dillinger Escape Plan

- Option Paralysis (2010)

Old Gods

- Old Gods EP (2011)
- Stylized Violence (2013)
- Give Them Color (2022)
