= Calculating Infinity =

Studio album by the Dillinger Escape Plan
- Released: September 28, 1999
- Recorded: March – June 1999
- Studio: Trax East (South River, New Jersey)
- Genres: Mathcore; hardcore punk; metalcore; avant-garde metal; grindcore
- Length: 37:27
- Labels: Relapse; Hydra Head
- Producers: Steve Evetts; Ben Weinman; Chris Pennie

The Dillinger Escape Plan chronology
Under the Running Board (1998)	Calculating Infinity (1999)	Irony Is a Dead Scene (2002)

Calculating Infinity is the debut studio album by the American metalcore band The Dillinger Escape Plan. Recorded at Trax East Recording Studio in South River, New Jersey, it was produced by engineer Steve Evetts with the band's guitarist Ben Weinman and drummer Chris Pennie, and released on September 28, 1999, by Relapse Records. Calculating Infinity is the band's only full-length album to feature original vocalist Dimitri Minakakis, who left the band in 2001.

Media response to Calculating Infinity was positive, with critics praising the aggressive nature of the album's material, as well as the complexity of the arrangement and instrumental work. Several publications have highlighted it as a landmark release in the Dillinger Escape Plan's catalogue and in hardcore punk and heavy metal as a whole. They also credited its influence on the genres and on the work of several subsequent bands. The record is also classified as metalcore, avant-garde metal, and grindcore, in addition to being highlighted as one of the first mathcore albums. Its lyrical themes mostly revolve around failing relationships and insecurity. By 2013, Calculating Infinity had sold in excess of 100,000 copies worldwide.

== Background ==
In 1998, The Dillinger Escape Plan wrote and recorded the EP Under the Running Board. During this time period, The Dillinger Escape Plan gained notoriety in the hardcore punk scene for the intensity of their performances which were increasingly wild, and often violent. This reputation, as well as the creative, technical approach of their music, led to Relapse Records offering the band a multi-record contract. Shortly after the release of Under the Running Board, rhythm guitarist John Fulton left the band to focus on his computer programming studies.

== Recording and production ==
Recording for Calculating Infinity took place in March, April, and June 1999 at Trax East Recording Studio in South River, New Jersey, with production led by Steve Evetts alongside lead guitarist Ben Weinman and drummer Chris Pennie. The recording process has been described by Weinman as "extremely difficult" due to technological limitations, and he was "very unhappy" with the recordings at first. In an interview with Decibel magazine, the guitarist added: "In the studio it was really hard, because at the time we didn't use Pro Tools and did everything to tape". The group also ran out of money during the process, resorting to trading their individual publishing rights for the songs to their label Relapse Records in return for $2,000. Weinman commented on this decision: "We weren't thinking about the future, just the present and how this record had to rule." Vocalist Dimitri Minakakis agreed: "We weren't focused on what the record could possibly do; we just wanted a record we were happy with," adding that it was a decision agreed to by every member of the band.

The band's original bassist Adam Doll was unable to contribute to the recording of Calculating Infinity after suffering a spinal fracture in a road traffic accident shortly before recording began, leaving Weinman to handle bass duties. Speaking to Kerrang! about Doll's injury, Weinman described it as "a life-changing moment" for the band, adding: "It was difficult to think about moving forward, but I felt he would get better and I wanted to make something for him to come back to". Rhythm guitarist Brian Benoit joined the band partway through the recording process and contributed additional guitar recordings to a handful of tracks, as well as writing a guitar part on "Clip the Apex... Accept Instruction" and assisting with vocal arrangements on "Variations on a Cocktail Dress". When asked whether the band considered delaying the recording of the album until Benoit was "fully integrated" into the band, Weinman responded: "The idea was ... for us to progress and build on what we had done" rather than "stopping our progression waiting for someone else to catch up"; Benoit also commented: "I knew my role, which was getting up to par live".

== Release and promotion ==
Calculating Infinity was released on September 28, 1999, with Relapse Records issuing it on CD and Hydra Head Records releasing a vinyl edition. The album was released later in Japan on April 5, 2000, featuring bonus tracks "The Mullet Burden", "Sandbox Magician" and "Abe the Cop" (the three tracks comprising Under the Running Board). To promote the album, The Dillinger Escape Plan opened for Mr. Bungle on the first leg of their California tour on Mr. Bungle frontman Mike Patton's invitation, and appeared on the Warped Tour and at various rock festivals. Patton was reportedly introduced to the band after being given the album, but he had been "one of the first people" to hear the album according to Weinman.

Calculating Infinity was reissued on vinyl alongside 2004's Miss Machine and 2007's Ire Works on November 27, 2015, marking the first time in more than ten years the album had been released on the format. The album reportedly sold in excess of 100,000 units worldwide, which made The Dillinger Escape Plan the best-selling artist on Relapse at the time.

== Music and lyrics ==
Commentators have primarily categorised Calculating Infinity as mathcore due to its frequent use of complex time signatures, atypical rhythms and unpredictable tempo changes. Many have claimed that The Dillinger Escape Plan "pioneered" or even "created" the genre with the release of their debut album. Others have described the album's style as metalcore, avant-garde metal, hardcore punk, grindcore, and post-hardcore. Speaking to The Independent, the band's guitarist Weinman suggested that the challenging nature of the album's material was intentional, explaining that "Calculating Infinity was us effectively ripping up the music theory book; if someone said 'don't harmonize with a second, it just sounds out of tune', then every single lead we did, we'd harmonize with a second. It sounded disgusting, but we did it". Natalie Zina Walschots of Exclaim! described the album's style as "even more avant-garde" than the band's first two extended plays, which she had noted featuring "complex and technical guitar work", "unpredictable shifts in tempo and tone" and "fractured song structures". Decibel writer Daniel Lake described the album as a combination of "gouts of noise, rhythmic chaos, jazzy runs and cinematic interludes".

According to vocalist Dimitri Minakakis, the majority of the lyrical content on Calculating Infinity is based on his experience in dysfunctional relationships. Speaking to Decibel magazine, Minakakis explained that "Most of my Dillinger lyrics were predicated on myself ... I just had stupid relationships with idiotic people, and I'd just write a song about it", concluding that "most of the lyrics on Calculating Infinity were based on human insecurity. That's where I got the best material." The album's title was suggested by guitarist Brian Benoit, who recalled to Decibel: "Since so much of the material lyrically was about failing relationships, I kind of took it as a "love not lasting forever" sort of thing ... Obviously, forever – or infinity – isn't going to happen ... so let's see how long we can calculate before this blows up in our face."

== Reception and legacy ==
Professional ratings
Review scores
Source	Rating
AllMusic	4/5 stars
Blistering	10/10
Chronicles of Chaos	9.5/10
Collector's Guide to Heavy Metal	7/10
Encyclopedia of Popular Music	4/5 stars
Sputnikmusic	5/5

Critical response to Calculating Infinity was positive. AllMusic writer Jason Hundey described the album as "spew[ing] forth anger and venomous misery in a way that is comparable only to spontaneous combustion", adding that it expands upon "the ultra-aggressive, deliciously technical approach they adopt toward grind and hardcore". Hundey praised the release for being "both screechingly abrasive ... and morbidly beautiful", dubbing it "explosive and brilliant", singling the tracks "43% Burnt" and "Weekend Sex Change" out for praise. Decibel's Kevin Stewart-Panko wrote: "Regardless of what you think about Calculating Infinity, you can't deny that the 11 tracks on this album revolutionized extreme music and raised the bar in terms of technicality, musicianship, speed, dynamics," describing it as a "groundbreaking metallic hardcore album". The CMJ New Music Report noted that "this noisy album is almost painful to listen to, but it's compelling enough to turn you into a happy masochist." Terrorizer magazine ranked the album as the 15th best release of the year, while Metal Hammer also included it in a retrospective top ten list for 1999 published in 2017.

Calculating Infinity has since been lauded as a landmark release for the band and the genre. Rolling Stone ranked it the 56th greatest metal album of all-time in a 2017 feature, praising it for featuring "an underlying logic, [and] a sense of structure that lifted songs ... to a realm above the noise and fury of everyday hardcore". In 2023, they listed "43% Burnt" as the 97th greatest metal song of all time. Metal Hammer columnist Stephen Hill claimed that the album "changed the face of metal" and demonstrated that the members of the band were "serious and inventive musicians, not just one dimensional noisemongers". Writing for MetalSucks, Amy Sciaretto suggested that Calculating Infinity was the album "that made Dillinger so revered by the metal underground, and obviously, those listening to metal", while Alternative Press writer Colin McGuire described the album as "one of the most influential collections of experimental metal the genre has seen in the last two decades". Metal Injection ranked Calculating Infinity as the sixth best debut album in heavy metal in a 2016 feature, while Loudwire ranked it at number ten on their own list on the same topic in 2017, with writer Graham Hartmann hailing it as "the most spastic, mathematical, chaotic and contradicting metal album ever released". In 2021, Tom Morgan of Invisible Oranges wrote: "The Dillinger Escape Plan would go on to spread their wings and in the process became legends, but their 1999 debut remains their most intense, explosive and frankly insane release. Calculating Infinity is a genuine landmark, an endlessly inventive album which upped the ante for heavy music – and has become one of the brightest jewels in Relapse’s stacked crown."

In 2020, John Hill of Loudwire included the album in his list of the "Top 25 Metalcore Albums of All Time."

It was cited as the band's best album by Bryan Rolli of Loudwire in 2025.

== Track listing ==
Credits adapted from the liner notes of Calculating Infinity. Songwriting credits via ASCAP.

No.	Title	Writer(s)	Length
1.	"Sugar Coated Sour"	Ben Weinman; Dimitri Minakakis	2:24
2.	"43% Burnt"	Weinman	4:31
3.	"Jim Fear"	Weinman	2:22
4.	"*#.."	Chris Pennie	2:41
5.	"Destro's Secret"	Weinman; Minakakis	1:56
6.	"The Running Board"	Weinman; Minakakis	3:21
7.	"Clip the Apex... Accept Instruction"	Weinman; Minakakis	3:29
8.	"Calculating Infinity"	Weinman	2:02
9.	"4th Grade Dropout"	Weinman; Minakakis	3:35
10.	"Weekend Sex Change"	Weinman; Pennie	3:11
11.	"Variations on a Cocktail Dress"	Weinman; Minakakis	7:55
Total length:			37:27

Japanese edition bonus tracks (Under the Running Board EP)
No.	Title	Writer(s)	Length
12.	"The Mullet Burden"	Weinman	1:50
13.	"Sandbox Magician"	Weinman; Minakakis	2:31
14.	"Abe the Cop"	Weinman; Minakakis	3:12
Total length:			45:00

"Variations on a Cocktail Dress" ends at 2:15; a hidden track containing samples from the 1959 film The Diary of Anne Frank begins after three minutes of silence.

== Personnel ==
Credits adapted from the liner notes of Calculating Infinity.

The Dillinger Escape Plan

- Dimitri Minakakis – vocals
- Ben Weinman – lead guitar, bass
- Brian Benoit – rhythm guitar
- Chris Pennie – drums, keyboards

Production

- Ben Weinman – production
- Chris Pennie – production
- Steve Evetts – production, engineering
- Aaron Harris – engineering assistance
- Jason Hellmann – engineering assistance
- Alan Douches – mastering
- Adam Peterson – graphic design
- Paul Delia – photography
- Scott Kinkade – additional photography
