= One of Us Is the Killer =

Studio album by The Dillinger Escape Plan
- Released: May 14, 2013
- Studios: Recorded in California and New Jersey, USA.
- Genres: Mathcore; progressive metal
- Length: 40:01
- Labels: Party Smasher; Sumerian
- Producer: Steve Evetts

The Dillinger Escape Plan chronology
| Option Paralysis (2010) | One of Us Is the Killer (2013) | Dissociation (2016) |

Singles from One of Us Is the Killer
- 1. "Prancer" Released: March 12, 2013

One of Us Is the Killer is the fifth studio album by American mathcore band The Dillinger Escape Plan, released on May 14, 2013. Released under the band's Party Smasher, Inc. imprint in partnership with Sumerian Records, it became the Dillinger Escape Plan's highest-charting album in the United States, reaching number 25 on the Billboard 200.

In 2023, a graphic novel based off the album was released on Sumerian Comics.

== Background ==
One of Us is the Killer documented the increasingly strained relationship between vocalist Greg Puciato, who wrote the lyrics, and guitarist Ben Weinman, who wrote the music. Puciato chose the album title after he finished writing the song of the same name. He explained that it related to how codependency can destroy relationships and taking responsibility for it happening.

In January 2012, Puciato issued a public apology after an incident on shrooms ended up with him requiring emergency medical assistance. Weinman, who identified as straight edge at the time, became increasingly bothered with how others assumed that drugs were a part of the Dillinger Escape Plan's music and writing process. He reiterated that "most of the core ethics, methods of this band, and what’s made us who we are, started in the first five years of the band" before Puciato's arrival.

After the incident, Weinman had an angry conversation with Puciato, which Weinman summarized as: "You’re the frontman and you’re the image of what this band is, not me in the basement working my ass off on riffs with a pot of coffee... If you put a fucking Mercedes in a shitty fucking Pinto shell, everyone is just going to see a shitty Pinto shell. They are not going to see the core of what went into that fucking machine."

When the two returned to the studio to record with the other band members, it still took time for things to gradually cool down between them. Puciato also recalled how producer Steve Evetts pushed him to the edge during the recording sessions, which he spent 23 days working on. "I don't even remember writing any of the lyrics on this album. I remember what it looks like in the room, but it's a bit of a whiteout," Puciato said.

== Music and lyrics ==
The song titles on the album were about the growing tension in Puciato and Weinman's relationship, although the name of the instrumental track "CH 375 268 277 ARS" is a cipher that only one person close to Puciato understands, which he clarified was not Weinman. In 2015, Puciato revealed that the album contained several references to Twilight Zone "that no one will ever find".

By the time of composing, several bands from the 1990s hardcore punk scene, which Weinman used to watch live, had reunited. This led to him and drummer Billy Rymer going back to many old records before jamming and writing. (Note: Among the bands which reunited from 2010 to 2013 were Jesuit (whose guitarist Brian Benoit also played in Dillinger), Refused, Coalesce, American Nightmare, Catharsis, Swing Kids and Black Flag.) They also tried to create more convoluted rhythms, making the record complex but "at the same time surprisingly groovy," according to Weinman. Upon hearing some of the instrumentals, Puciato thought, "What the fuck is happening? This sounds like a beehive!" A statement following Puciato's contributions to the album said that the musical style of One of Us Is the Killer would be "progressive ambient mixed with noise", instead.

== Recording ==
Prior to recording One of Us Is the Killer, the band essentially constructed a studio around its practice space, making it the first album where all the music was composed during the writing process, except for a riff which originated when the band toured a few months before.

Vocalist Greg Puciato noted that the album "took a lot longer" to record, with the band members recording their respective instruments on consecutive days rather than alternating: "This time we did it traditionally and everyone tracked their instruments in succession. So I spent 25 days in a row recording vocals," said Puciato. He explained that this helped him to concentrate on how he delivered the vocals:

I thought it would be a real detriment, because after three or four days I would start to sound different. But it was the opposite. For some reason, being able to completely immerse and not poke your head out every two or three days really allowed us to go down the rabbit hole and keep the microscope on the vocals without having to switch gears. I think we ended up with better vocals because of that.

Although The Dillinger Escape Plan members liked the results, the process was extremely stressful and some vocal lines went through fifty takes before settling on one, while they made long-time producer Steve Evetts mix some songs "to the brink of exhaustion", e.g. "Prancer" was mixed around twenty-five times. Puciato said that Evetts almost quit ten times when recording, but they remained friends:

The reason we can do that is because we trust one another completely. ... We're really good friends and we live very close to one another, so we hang out a lot outside of the studio. I think that help keep our relationship positive. If all he had were the memories of making Dillinger records, he wouldn't want to talk to us ever again!

One of Us Is the Killer features high-profile guest vocalists playing other instruments, but the band members are not allowed to mention them. Puciato said, "think in terms of James Hetfield hitting a xylophone, but he's not one of them. ... They can reveal themselves and what they did if they ever want to individually."

== Promotion ==
In contrast to their previous releases, previews of material slated to be on the album prior to its announcement were scarce. The band announced the album title and cover on their Facebook page on February 18, 2013. The first single from the album, "Prancer", was released on the iTunes Store, Google Play, and Amazon MP3 on March 12. On April 1, the band shared a preview of the album on Facebook, released by the label on YouTube on March 31. An official music video for the second track, "When I Lost My Bet" was released on YouTube on April 23, 2013. The album was streamed in its entirety on May 12. The single "Prancer" was used in the closing credits of the 2013 horror film Sanatorium.

== Reception ==
=== Critical reception ===
Professional ratings
Aggregate scores
| Source | Rating |
|---|---|
| Metacritic | 79/100 |
Review scores
| Source | Rating |
| About.com | 4.5/5 stars |
| Allmusic | 4/5 stars |
| Alternative Press | 4/5 stars |
| Exclaim! | 8/10 |
| Metal Injection | 10/10 |
| musicOMH | 4.5/5 stars |
| Spin | 7/10 |
| Sputnikmusic | 4.1/5 |
| This Is Fake DIY | 8/10 |

One Of Us Is the Killer achieved widespread critical acclaim. Metacritic, which assigns a normalized rating out of 100 to reviews from mainstream critics, gives the album an average score of 79, based on 10 reviews. Gregory Heaney of Allmusic, giving the album 4 out of 5 stars, commented on the album's accessibility (without the band leaving their signature sound), saying "This shift toward playing to the listener's gut rather than head gives The Dillinger Escape Plan a newfound level of accessibility without diminishing the impact of their punishing sound, and though it might seem like they're smoothing out the edges of their sound and turning their swords into plowshares, the reality is that they've just turned it into a different kind of weapon.", while Jacob Royal of Sputnikmusic gave the album a rating of 4.1 out of 5, stating "One Of Us Is the Killer is easily the most sprawling piece of work The Dillinger Escape Plan has created yet."

== Track listing ==
All lyrics are written by Greg Puciato; all music is composed by Ben Weinman

| No. | Title | Length |
|---|---|---|
| 1. | "Prancer" | 3:52 |
| 2. | "When I Lost My Bet" | 3:53 |
| 3. | "One of Us Is the Killer" | 3:28 |
| 4. | "Hero of the Soviet Union" | 3:00 |
| 5. | "Nothing's Funny" | 3:26 |
| 6. | "Understanding Decay" | 3:48 |
| 7. | "Paranoia Shields" | 4:27 |
| 8. | "CH 375 268 277 ARS" | 2:32 |
| 9. | "Magic That I Held You Prisoner" | 2:49 |
| 10. | "Crossburner" | 5:05 |
| 11. | "The Threat Posed by Nuclear Weapons" | 3:46 |

UK iTunes bonus track
| No. | Title | Length |
|---|---|---|
| 12. | "One of Us Is the Killer" (Extended Version) | 4:59 |

Japanese Bonus Track
| No. | Title | Length |
|---|---|---|
| 12. | "One of Us Is the Killer" (WIFE Remix) | 4:33 |

Best Buy Exclusive Bonus Tracks
| No. | Title | Length |
|---|---|---|
| 12. | "One of Us Is the Killer" (Easy Girl Remix) | 5:25 |
| 13. | "Nothing's Funny" (Demo) | 3:39 |

== Personnel ==
One of Us Is the Killer personnel according to CD liner notes.

The Dillinger Escape Plan

- Greg Puciato – lead vocals
- Ben Weinman – guitars, programming
- Liam Wilson – bass
- Billy Rymer – drums

Additional musicians

- Patrick Dougherty – trumpet, flugelhorn
- "Tuba-Joe" Exley – tuba, valve trombone

Production

- Steve Evetts – engineering, production
- Ben Weinman – additional production
- Alan Douches – mastering

Artwork and design

- Brian Montuori – art direction, ink drawings, handwriting
- Daniel McBride – post-production, assemblage

== Charts ==
| Chart (2013) | Peak position |
|---|---|
| Australian Albums (ARIA) | 45 |
| Austrian Albums (Ö3 Austria) | 52 |
| Belgian Albums (Ultratop Flanders) | 146 |
| Finnish Albums (Suomen virallinen lista) | 34 |
| French Albums (SNEP) | 147 |
| German Albums (Offizielle Top 100) | 84 |
| Japanese Albums (Oricon) | 131 |
| Scottish Albums (Official Charts) | 63 |
| Swiss Albums (Schweizer Hitparade) | 92 |
| UK Albums (Official Charts) | 64 |
| UK Independent Albums (Official Charts) | 16 |
| UK Rock & Metal Albums (Official Charts) | 6 |
| US Billboard 200 | 25 |
| US Independent Albums (Billboard) | 4 |
| US Top Hard Rock Albums (Billboard) | 1 |
| US Top Rock Albums (Billboard) | 6 |
| US Indie Store Album Sales (Billboard) | 8 |
