= Dissociation (album) =

Studio album by The Dillinger Escape Plan
- Released: October 14, 2016
- Genre: Mathcore; progressive metal
- Length: 50:07
- Label: Party Smasher; Cooking Vinyl
- Producer: Steve Evetts

The Dillinger Escape Plan chronology
One of Us Is the Killer (2013)	Dissociation (2016)

Singles from Dissociation
- 1. "Limerent Death" Released: August 5, 2016; 2. "Symptom of Terminal Illness" Released: September 26, 2016

Dissociation is the sixth and final album by American metal band The Dillinger Escape Plan. It was released on October 14, 2016, by Party Smasher Inc. Alongside the announcement of the album, the band revealed it would be their last, breaking up after the album's touring cycle.

== Background ==
In August 2016, a press release titled "Is this the end of The Dillinger Escape Plan?!", The Dillinger Escape Plan announced that their new album, Dissociation, would be released on October 14, the band said that the record is "potentially" their last ever release, and that they will shortly be heading into an "extended hiatus", In a Noisey interview, guitarist Ben Weinman described the "extended hiatus" as a natural destination for the band rather than the result of a dispute, with the band members intending to avoid "pulling a Seinfeld and [instead] go out while we're still on top .. I don't like the idea of slowing down or doing it less often, I like to just dive in full-force and take things to the extreme because that's what this band has always been about."

Around the time of the announcement it was unclear whether the band was breaking up or taking an extended hiatus. However, in an interview with Metal Hammer Magazine vocalist Greg Puciato spoke about the use of the term "Extended hiatus" saying, "Extended hiatus' would lead people to believe that we think we're gonna come back. We're breaking up. We're not going on an extended hiatus."

== Composition, lyrics and recording ==
In July, 2015, Weinman announced during an Australian interview that the band will return to the studio in November to record the follow-up to their 2013 album One of Us Is the Killer. When asked about the sound of the album Weinman said "It doesn’t sound like anything in our catalogue production-wise. Calculating didn't sound like any record I had ever heard, it sounded cold and weird. In that respect, it's kind of a bookend to Calculating."

Greg Puciato had chosen the title Dissociation as early as mid-2013. Around three-quarters in the making of the album, Weinman and the singer discussed and eventually decided to finish the band, a situation which coincidentally matched the album's title and some of its themes addressed, such as personal loss and separation. Later on, Puciato had to explain that the overall lyrics of Dissociation did not refer to the separation of the band.

Before composing the songs, Puciato listened to their instrumental hundreds of times, in different environments, until a "breakthrough" happened which usually involved a short verse, and after that his writing naturally progressed. As with previous albums, he approached the lyrics from a personal perspective and they reflected issues he dealt with at the time, reason as to why several songs came from "a position of vulnerability." He described this process as difficult, and likened it to "jamming your finger down your throat and throwing up and seeing what's there. Then you take these chunks and form them into whatever you're working with."

The opening track, "Limerent Death", was recorded with a Shure SM58 microphone with a 1176 Peak Limiter compressor. On the bridge before its short outro, Puciato repeats the verse "I gave you everything you wanted/You were everything to me," increasingly louder and distorted for more than a minute, in what Revolver called the attestation to his "full sacrificial commitment to his craft." Deliberately, this phrasing was the last part recorded for the album, with the singer intending to evoke an "emotional exorcism" in a single take. Once finished, he ended up on the verge of passing out and vomiting. Weiman referred to "Limerent Death" as "one of my all-time favorite DEP songs, I feel that this song is one of the rare instances where all the members are feeling, and conveying, the same energy from start to end. A sharp focused dagger plowing its way through thick heavy walls." In a December 2017 fan poll, the song would be elected as the best vocal performance by Puciato.

The last song, "Dissociation", is an electronic ballad accompanied by string quartet SEVEN)SUNS. The track was based on a drum loop that Weinman and drummer Zach Hill had created in the mid-2000s, whereas its melody was created by Puciato in 1999, when he was nineteen years old, and both pieces coincidentally fitted with each other. The singer described the creation of the song as "com[ing] full circle".

== Promotion, release and tour ==
The band announced the album's release date of October 14, 2016 alongside premiering the track "Limerent Death" on BBC Radio 1’s Rock Show with Daniel P. Carter. On September 27, 2016 the band released the second and final single from the album "Symptom of Terminal Illness". On October 14, the album was released on the band's own label, Party Smasher Inc.

On February 12, 2017, during their European farewell tour, The Dillinger Escape Plan was involved in a vehicle crash after a truck collided with their bus near Radomsko, Poland. The truck driver, who ended up seriously wounded, pleaded guilty to falling asleep while driving. Thirteen people in all were injured, and while none of the band members were gravely hurt, they "narrowly survived" the incident. In April 2018, rhythm guitarist Kevin Antreassian revealed he had two fractured vertebrae and, as a consequence, played with a back brace for a month. Puciato tore a quadriceps, which he did not treat immediately and worsened, and in an extensive 2018 interview with Kerrang! the singer revealed that he began to suffer from serious mental health issues during this tour, including panic disorder and hypochondria, but following the accident his symptoms became "almost unlivable" and had to receive treatment. Fans raised over $20,000 in a week to the band following the crash. While dealing with this and other incidents, Puciato wrote extensively and took thousands of pictures during the tour, which helped him to go through that period. His writing and photographs were eventually released as the book Separate the Dawn, released on February 12, 2019, on the second anniversary of their bus accident.

== Critical reception ==
Professional ratings
Aggregate scores
Source	Rating
Metacritic	86/100
Review scores
Source	Rating
AllMusic	4.5/5 stars
Exclaim!	10/10
Kerrang!	4/5 stars
PopMatters	9/10 stars
The Line of Best Fit	4/5 stars
Metal Injection	8/10 stars
Pitchfork	6.9/10

Dissociation received acclaim from music critics. At Metacritic, which assigns a rating out of 100 to reviews from mainstream critics, the album has an average score of 86 based on 15 reviews, indicating "universal acclaim".

== Track listing ==
All tracks are written by Greg Puciato and Ben Weinman

No.	Title	Length
1.	"Limerent Death"	4:06
2.	"Symptom of Terminal Illness"	4:03
3.	"Wanting Not So Much to as To"	5:23
4.	"FUGUE"	3:49
5.	"Low Feels Blvd"	4:05
6.	"Surrogate"	5:05
7.	"Honeysuckle"	4:22
8.	"Manufacturing Discontent"	4:22
9.	"Apologies Not Included"	3:23
10.	"Nothing to Forget"	5:15
11.	"Dissociation"	6:14

== Personnel ==
Dissociation personnel according to liner notes.

The Dillinger Escape Plan

- Greg Puciato – vocals
- Ben Weinman – lead guitar
- Kevin Antreassian – rhythm guitar
- Liam Wilson – bass
- Billy Rymer – drums, percussion

Additional musicians

- Andrew Digrius – trumpet
- SEVEN)Suns – performed and arranged all strings:
  - Amanda Lo – violin
  - Earl Maneein – violin, viola
  - Fung Chern Hwei – viola, violin
  - Jennifer Devore – cello
- Zach Hill – additional drums on "Dissociation"

Production

- Steve Evetts – engineering, production
- Josh Wilbur – additional engineering
- Kevin Antreassian – additional engineering
- Mike Watts – additional engineering
- Frank Mitaritonna – additional engineering
- Nicholas Starrantino – assistance engineer
- Jonathan Maisto – assistance engineer
- Benjamin Weinman – assistance engineer
- Kurt Ballou – mixing at GodCity Studio
- Josh Wilbur – mixing
- Alan Douches – mastering at West West Side

== Charts ==
Chart (2016)	Peak position
Australian Albums (ARIA)	14
Belgian Albums (Ultratop Flanders)	78
Belgian Albums (Ultratop Wallonia)	99
Canadian Albums (Billboard)	80
French Albums (SNEP)	177
German Albums (Offizielle Top 100)	100
New Zealand Heatseekers Albums (RMNZ)	5
Scottish Albums (OCC)	32
Swiss Albums (Schweizer Hitparade)	60
UK Albums (OCC)	47
US Billboard 200	31
