= Dimitri Minakakis =

American musician and graphic designer (born 1977)

Dimitri Minakakis (Greek: Δημήτρης Μηνακάκης; born June 16, 1977, in Morristown, New Jersey) is an American musician and graphic designer best known as the original singer of the band The Dillinger Escape Plan from 1997 to 2001. Replaced by Greg Puciato for the duration of the band's original run, Minakakis returned to the lineup when the band reunited in 2024.

== Music career ==
=== Arcane / The Dillinger Escape Plan ===
In the mid-1990s, Minakakis was invited by guitarist Ben Weinman, with whom he went to the same school, to form a hardcore punk group because he "looked like a singer" due to his imposing physique. In 1996, they founded the political-oriented act Arcane along with drummer Chris Pennie. In 1997, Arcane evolved into The Dillinger Escape Plan with the addition of bassist Adam Doll.

The Dillinger Escape Plan's second EP, 1998's Under the Running Board, and their 1999 debut album, Calculating Infinity, developed a much faster and more technical approach to mathcore and became critically acclaimed landmarks of the genre, and were influential in extreme music circles. Minakakis' lyrics on Calculating Infinity were based on failing relationships and human insecurity. He has stated that people "always interpret them in weird ways". Its album cover was taken from the inside tubes of an old record player owned by Minakakis' mother. The band's live shows became increasingly aggressive and reckless, with Minakakis starting to breathe fire. Calculating Infinity went on to sell over 100,000 copies, making Dillinger the best-selling band signed to Relapse Records at the time.

In 2001 and after tours in North America, Europe and Asia, Minakakis left the band on good terms to focus on his family life and began working full-time on graphic arts and design. Minakakis remains close with the other band members, including former frontman, Greg Puciato.

In 2004, he laid out the cover artwork for the Dillinger album Miss Machine. He went on to provide guest vocals on the track "Fix Your Face" on the 2007 Dillinger Escape Plan album Ire Works and joined them on occasion to perform it. He also created the artwork for the 2010 Dillinger Escape Plan album Option Paralysis.

On December 28 and 29, 2017, Dimitri Minakakis joined The Dillinger Escape Plan for their last two shows at Terminal 5 in New York City.

On December 12, 2023, the Dillinger Escape Plan announced their reunion concert with Minakakis.

=== Collaboration with other artists ===
In 2003, Minakakis founded and performed a yearlong stint with the defunct band Tokyo with former members of Knives Out from Philadelphia.

In 2011, Minakakis became a member of Argonauts along with members of Municipal Waste and Burnt by the Sun. In 2012, he left the band due to scheduling conflicts.

== Musical style and influence ==
Minakakis' vocal style consists almost entirely of screaming inspired directly from hardcore punk yells. His vocal delivery and also The Dillinger Escape Plan's music, particularly on their self-titled EP, have been compared to Tim Singer of the fellow New Jersey metalcore band Deadguy. In a 2000 interview, Minakakis cited Rush, The Beatles and Faith No More as his biggest musical influences.

== Discography ==
=== With The Dillinger Escape Plan ===
As a member

- 1997 The Dillinger Escape Plan (including the 2000 reissue tracks)
- 1998 Under the Running Board
- 1998 Split with Nora
- 1999 Split with Drowningman
- 1999 Calculating Infinity

As a guest

- 2007 Ire Works (guest vocals on opening track "Fix Your Face")
