= Brian Benoit =

- Born: 1970s
- Genres: Mathcore, hardcore punk
- Instruments: Guitar, Keyboards

Brian Benoit is a former guitarist for The Dillinger Escape Plan. Before playing in Dillinger, Brian played in Jesuit with future Converge bassist Nate Newton. Brian joined Dillinger Escape Plan prior to recording Calculating Infinity and performed on the EP Irony Is a Dead Scene and LP Miss Machine.

In late 2004, just after the release of Miss Machine, Brian developed nerve damage in his left hand, which forced him to leave the band in 2005. He was replaced on tour by James Love and Jeff Tuttle, though Ben Weinman was the only guitar player on subsequent releases. Frontman Greg Puciato said that Brian still had a place in the band should he be able to return; he eventually did return for two shows on December 27 and 28, 2017.

Benoit also played reunion shows with Jesuit in 2011.

== Discography ==
With Jesuit

- Jesuit (1999)
- Discography (2011)

With The Dillinger Escape Plan

- Calculating Infinity (1999)
- Irony Is a Dead Scene (2002)
- Miss Machine (2004)
