= Liam Wilson =

American bassist (born 1979)

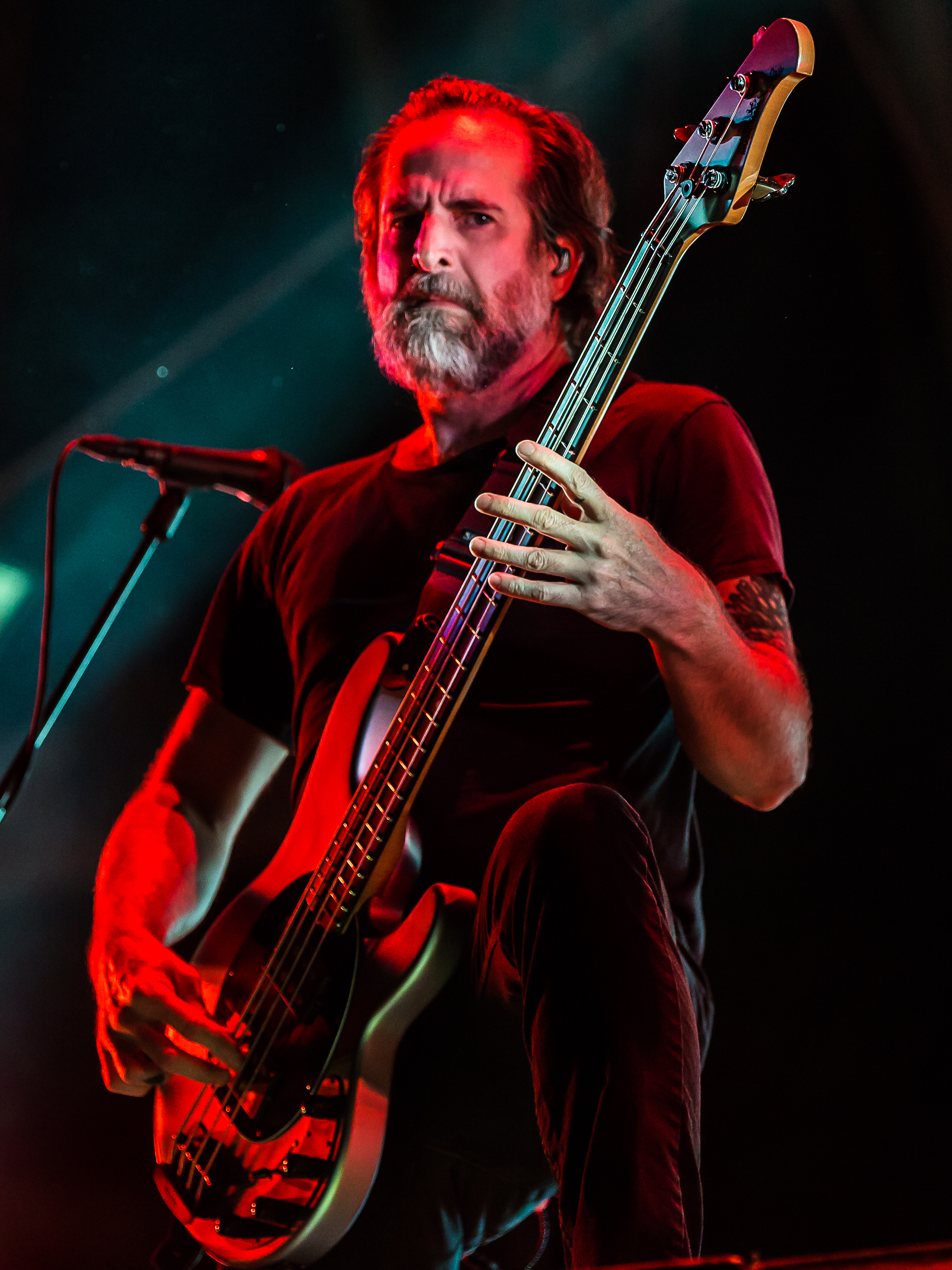
- Wilson performing with In Flames in 2023

Background information
- Born: December 22, 1979 (age 46)
- Origin: Philadelphia, Pennsylvania, U.S.
- Genres: Metalcore; mathcore; progressive metal; post-hardcore; melodic death metal
- Occupation: Bassist
- Member of: The Dillinger Escape Plan; Azusa; John Frum; In Flames
- Formerly of: Starkweather; Frodus

Liam Wilson (born December 22, 1979) is an American musician. He is currently the bassist of In Flames. He is best known as bass player of the Dillinger Escape Plan since 2000, and previously played for Starkweather and Frodus. He is also a member of Azusa and John Frum, and is an advocate of veganism.

Wilson is capable of playing both finger-style and with a pick, although he used a pick almost exclusively with the Dillinger Escape Plan as he felt it fit the music more.

== Career ==
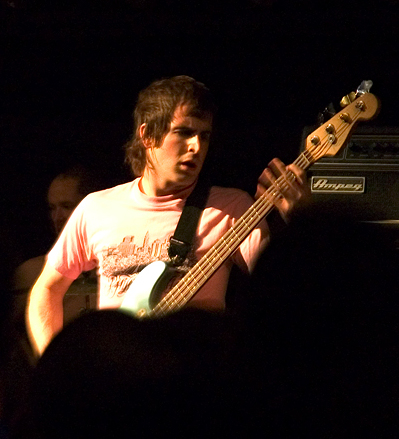
Wilson performing with the Dillinger Escape Plan in 2005

Wilson joined the Dillinger Escape Plan in Autumn 2000, replacing Jeff Wood, becoming an official member in December of that year. He stayed in DEP for the rest of their run, until 2017. When the band reunited in 2023, Wilson again returned on bass.

Wilson played bass on Croatoan, an album by Starkweather, in 2005. Wilson performed with the band Frodus (aptly labeled "Frodus Escape Plan") for a few reunion shows in March 2009.

Wilson was featured on the cover of Bass Player's September 2013 issue. He has also written several columns for the magazine, in which he extols the virtues of Bikram yoga in relation to his bass playing.

Wilson is a founding member of John Frum, a progressive death metal, featuring Matt Hollenberg (a guitarist for avant garde jazz legend John Zorn), Eli Litwin (Knife The Glitter) and Derek Rydquist (former vocalist of The Faceless).

Wilson joined progressive extreme metal supergroup, Azusa in 2014, alongside then former Extol members, Christer Espevoll and David Husvik.

In 2020, Wilson was chosen to perform in one of Devin Townsend's live bands that year. However most of the shows were postponed due to COVID-19.

In June 2023, Wilson joined melodic death metal band In Flames, replacing departing bassist Bryce Paul. In May 2024, he became an official member.

== Personal life ==
Concerned about environmental causes, Wilson wore a shirt with the homemade message "Stop MTM/VF" on the Dillinger Escape Plan's February 2, 2008, appearance on Late Night with Conan O'Brien. Wilson has been a big advocate for veganism and has appeared in several pro-vegan advertisements for PETA, although in recent years he has distanced himself from the organization and is more flexible about those beliefs because of his yoga, and transcendental meditation practices.

Wilson married his long-time girlfriend Jessica Curreri in 2020, in a private ceremony.

== Discography ==
=== With the Dillinger Escape Plan ===
- Irony Is a Dead Scene (2002)
- Miss Machine (2004)
- Ire Works (2007)
- Option Paralysis (2010)
- One of Us Is the Killer (2013)
- Dissociation (2016)

=== With Starkweather ===
- Croatoan (2006)

=== With Frodus ===
- Soundlab 1 (2010)

=== With John Frum ===
- A Stirring in the Noos (2017)

=== With Azusa ===
- Heavy Yoke (2018)
- Loops of Yesterday (2020)
