= Miss Machine =

Studio album by The Dillinger Escape Plan
- Released: July 20, 2004
- Recorded: 2004
- Genres: Mathcore; metalcore; avant-garde metal; jazz metal
- Length: 39:54
- Label: Relapse
- Producers: Steve Evetts; Benjamin Weinman; Chris Pennie

The Dillinger Escape Plan chronology
Irony Is a Dead Scene (2002)	Miss Machine (2004)	Plagiarism (2006)

Singles from Miss Machine
- 1. "Panasonic Youth" Released: June 21, 2004; 2. "Setting Fire to Sleeping Giants" Released: 2004; 3. "Unretrofied" Released: 2005

Miss Machine is the second studio album by the American metalcore band The Dillinger Escape Plan released in July 2004 through Relapse Records. It is the first album by the band to feature vocalist Greg Puciato and bassist Liam Wilson. Miss Machine marks a change to a more experimental style by the band.

The album is The Dillinger Escape Plan's first album since 1999, the gap between albums being accredited to a number of bad fortunes, and a short EP release with lead vocals being performed by Mike Patton. There were three music videos made for the album ("Panasonic Youth", "Unretrofied", and "Setting Fire to Sleeping Giants") directed by Neurosis' Josh Graham. The band decided to feature metalcore producer Steve Evetts to produce the album.

== Musical direction ==
Until the band's 2007 release of Ire Works, Miss Machine was considered the band's most experimental release to date, as the band drew from the experience of working with Mike Patton and the industrial influence of bands such as Nine Inch Nails. It is also arguably their most accessible due to the band toning down the musical complexity and adding new elements like slower song tempos, singing vocals, and more straightforward song structures.

Due to Mike Patton collaborating with the band, his experimental influences began to rub off on The Dillinger Escape Plan. In addition, Greg Puciato was involved with Error, an industrial band, around the same time as the release of Miss Machine, all of which would form their sound on Miss Machine. The album turned out to be much more experimental, and include many more jazz-fusion elements and electronics. Weinman's guitars were not as prominent in the mix, and Pennie's drumming was not as demanding.

Andrew Racher of Brooklyn Vegan said calling the album mathcore was "too niche" and "undersells it." He described the album's sound as "progressive circus acid freakout avant-goth metallic rock."

== Reception ==
=== Critical reception ===
Professional ratings
Aggregate scores
Source	Rating
Metacritic	80/100
Review scores
Source	Rating
AllMusic	4.5/5 stars
Chronicles of Chaos	9/10
Drowned in Sound	10/10
NME	7/10
Pitchfork	6.8/10
Playlouder	4.5/5 stars
Rolling Stone	2/5 stars
Stylus	B−
Spin	B+
Tiny Mix Tapes	4/5 stars

The critical reception for Miss Machine was relatively favorable, with AllMusic going so far as to say, "There's nothing more to say — the next true image of rock & roll has crawled out of the swamps of Jersey." Despite being positive in their review, Pitchfork noticed "Though Miss Machine displays DEP in top musical form, the band seems to have lost its confidence and direction." Rolling Stone, however, was negative, noticing "unless you're trying to drive a third world dictator out of his barricaded palace, you'll be hard pressed to listen to Miss Machine in its entirety." Miss Machine has earned a metascore of 80 on review aggregate site Metacritic indicating favorable reviews.

Phil Aherne of Cherwell described the Dillinger Escape Plan as one of the first pioneers of 'jazz-metal' and deemed Miss Machine to be "an impressive collection of songs, ranging from the incoherent 'Panasonic Youth' to the elegantly refined 'Unretrofied'. The music is layered and dense, and yields to many re-plays. Unfortunately, that does not essentially make it catchy. It is very much an acquired taste – incorporating jazz-chords in grinding thrash is a majestic form of dissonance."

== Track listing ==
All tracks are written by Ben Weinman and Greg Puciato except where noted.

No.	Title	Writer(s)	Length
1.	"Panasonic Youth"		2:27
2.	"Sunshine the Werewolf"		4:17
3.	"Highway Robbery"		3:30
4.	"Van Damsel"		2:59
5.	"Phone Home"	Chris Pennie, Puciato	4:15
6.	"We Are the Storm"		4:38
7.	"Crutch Field Tongs"	Pennie	0:52
8.	"Setting Fire to Sleeping Giants"	Weinman	3:27
9.	"Baby's First Coffin"		4:02
10.	"Unretrofied"	Weinman	5:37
11.	"The Perfect Design"		3:50

Japanese bonus tracks
No.	Title	Length
12.	"My Michelle" (Guns N' Roses cover)	4:07
13.	"Damaged Pt. 1&2" (Black Flag cover)	4:55

== Personnel ==
The Dillinger Escape Plan

- Greg Puciato – vocals
- Ben Weinman – lead guitar
- Brian Benoit – rhythm guitar
- Liam Wilson – bass
- Chris Pennie – drums

Production

- Ben Weinman – production
- Chris Pennie – production
- Steve Evetts – production, engineering, mixing
- Jesse Cannon – Pro Tools
- Tom Shumway – assistant engineering
- James Russo – assistant engineering
- Alan Douches – mastering
- Mike Watkajtys – live sound engineering
- Brian Montuori – artwork and direction
- Dimitri Minakakis – layout and design
- Matthew Jacobson – executive production

== Charts ==
Chart (2004)	Peak position
US Billboard 200	106
US Top Heatseekers	2
US Top Independent Albums	4
US Top Internet Albums	106
