= Ben Weinman =

American guitarist

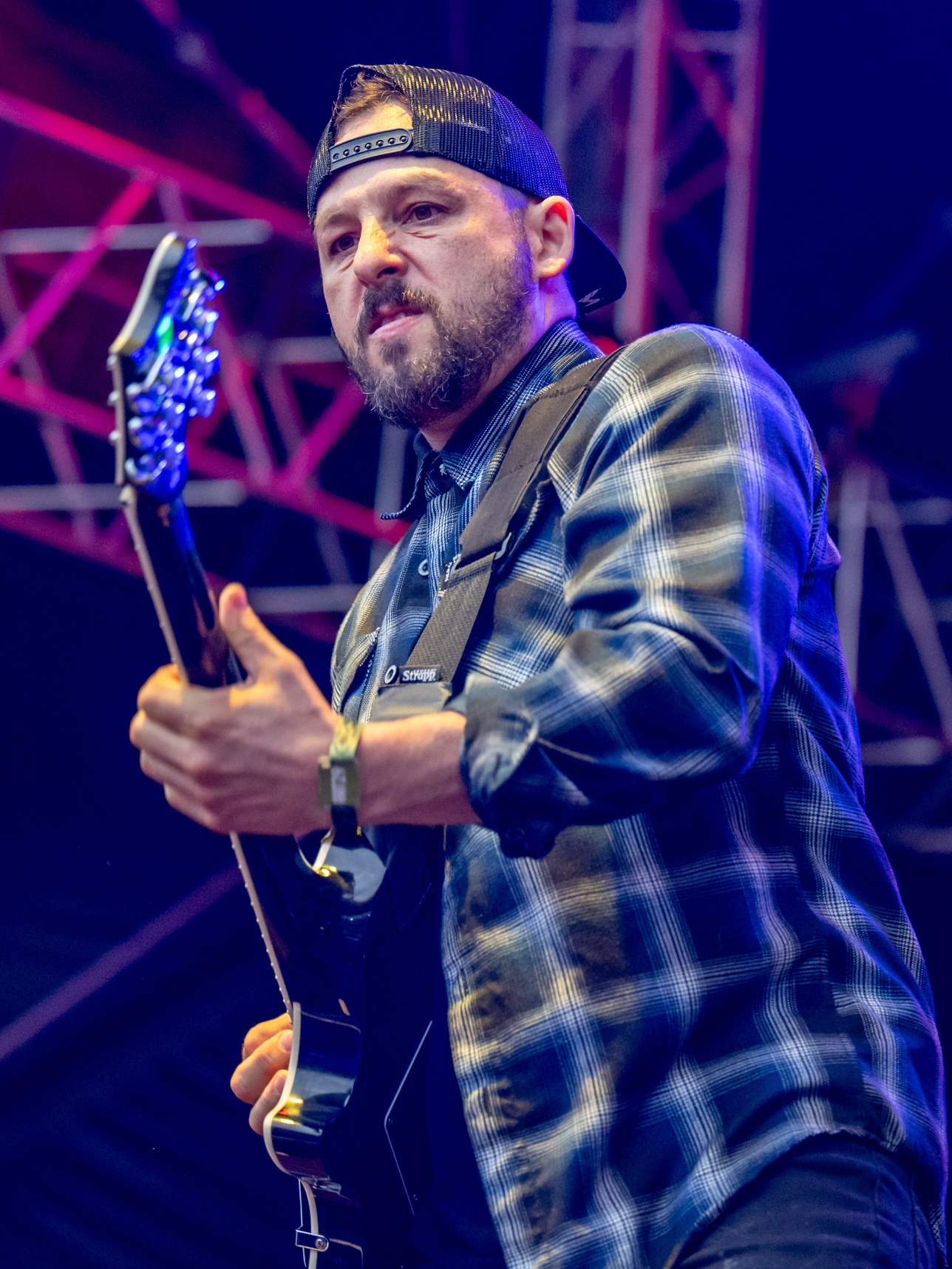
- Weinman at Save the Core in 2024

Background information
- Born: August 8, 1975 (age 51); Morris Plains, New Jersey, U.S.
- Genres: Mathcore; hardcore punk; metalcore; experimental rock; progressive rock; film score; thrash metal
- Occupations: Musician; songwriter; composer
- Instruments: Guitar; keyboards; bass
- Years active: 1997-present
- Member of: Giraffe Tongue Orchestra; Suicidal Tendencies; The Dillinger Escape Plan

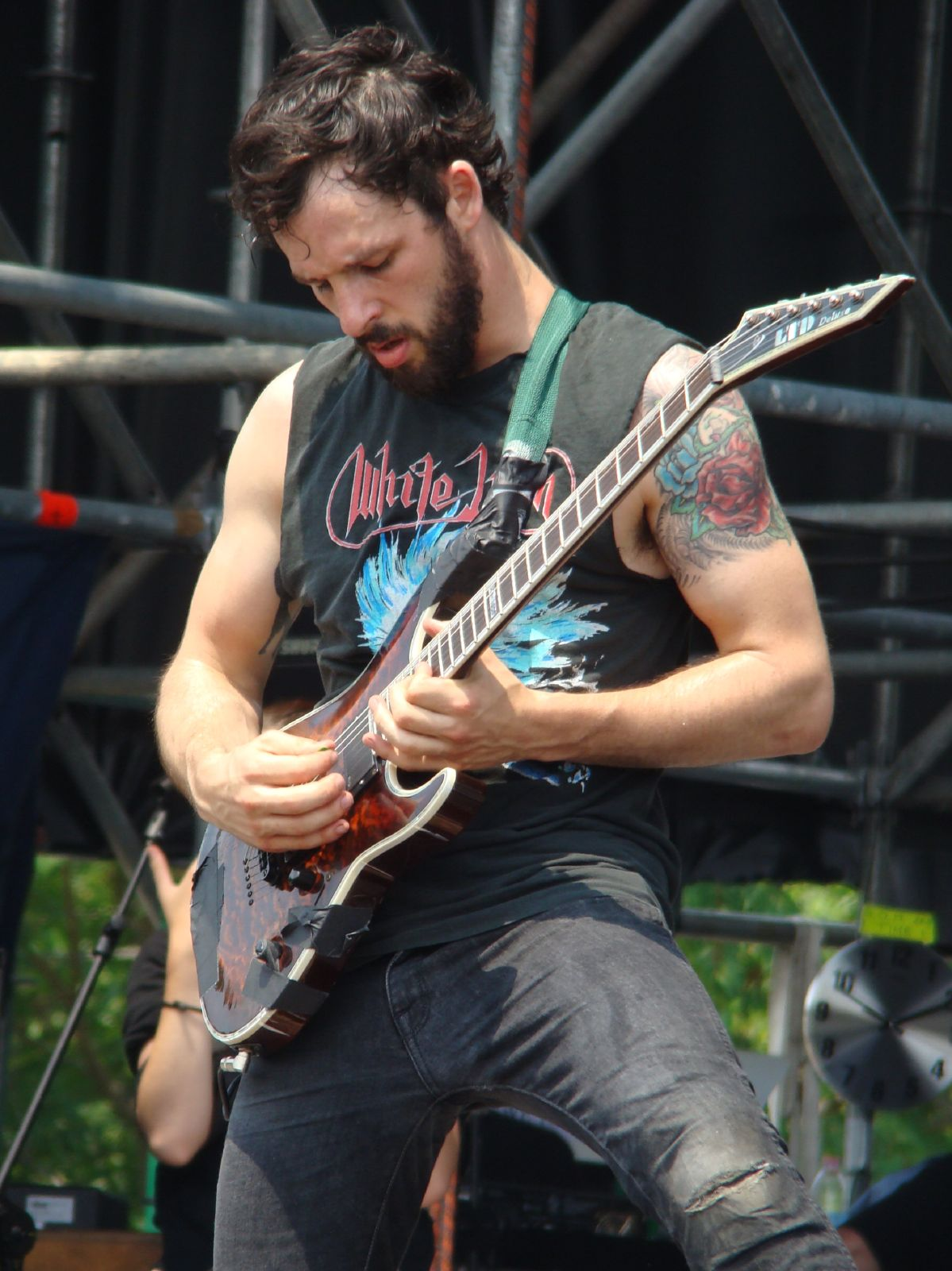
Weinman performing with The Dillinger Escape Plan in 2008

Benjamin A. Weinman (born August 8, 1975) is an American musician, most-notable for being the lead-guitarist and primary songwriter of the mathcore band the Dillinger Escape Plan (DEP). He is the founder and sole constant member of the DEP, he is currently playing rhythm guitar with the crossover thrash band Suicidal Tendencies and lead guitar in the progressive rock supergroup Giraffe Tongue Orchestra.

Weinman was named one of SPIN Magazine's 100 Greatest Guitarists of all Time, and one of the 20 most-influential Metal Guitarists of the modern Era by VH1. Weinman was named one of Guitar World Magazine's 50 fastest guitar players of all time alongside guitar players such as Eddie Van Halen and Les Paul. He was named one of Guitar World's Top 25 Cult Guitarists in 2009, and one of the top modern Metal Guitar players by MetalSucks. Weinman has also been listed on About.com as an example of today's most-important musicians under their definition of "guitarist" and was named one of Alternative Press Magazine's "10 favorite Guitar-Slingers".

== Early life ==
Weinman grew up in Morris Plains, New Jersey. He is of Austrian-Jewish and Polish-Jewish/Austrian descent through his grandparents who fled to the United States before World War II. Weinman's family was not actively observant but he grew up "with a real appreciation of the culture of Judaism". He was diagnosed with attention deficit disorder (ADD) as a child. He later stated that "music saved his life" because it helped him to discover new ways of learning, make friends, and it gave him a sense of purpose.

Weinman attended Fairleigh Dickinson University in Madison, New Jersey where he first received a degree in psychology in 2000 and then in corporate communications, a field in which he worked for some time afterwards at a web company.

== Career ==
=== The Dillinger Escape Plan ===
Weinman played in some bands from New Jersey and in 1996 he founded the hardcore punk band Arcane along with Chris Pennie on drums, Dimitri Minakakis on vocals, Bruce Fulton on bass and Brad McMann on second vocals. He describes the group as a "lost cause" due to their lack of innovation. After a few months, they turned around its style, with Adam Doll replacing Fulton and Derek Brantley taking over second guitar replacing McMann. Eventually, Arcane evolved into the Dillinger Escape Plan in 1997. Weinman gradually shifted his focus on being a full-time musician and eventually quit his corporate job.

Weinman has been involved in all the band's releases since their self-titled debut EP, as well as various other musical works. Weinman has self-managed or has been involved with the management of The Dillinger Escape Plan since the band's inception. Known for his outspoken views on the music industry, he has contributed to various publications and spoken at universities and conferences on the subjects of music production and the music business. Weinman's business techniques and philosophies have been discussed, and featured, in publications such as Forbes, the Huffington Post, and Bloomberg Businessweek.

On February 6, 2012, Weinman appeared on the VH1 series Metal Evolution in the final episode on progressive metal where The Dillinger Escape Plan was quoted as being "the world's most dangerous band".

The band's second full-length album, Miss Machine, was the first album released by record label Relapse Records to make the Billboard charts. Weinman's first full-length studio album with The Dillinger Escape Plan, entitled Calculating Infinity, was listed in the book The Top 500 Heavy Metal Albums of all Time by Martin Popoff. Calculating Infinity was also named one of "100 best rock albums of all time" by Kerrang magazine, who presented Weinman with a spirit of independence award.

=== Other projects ===
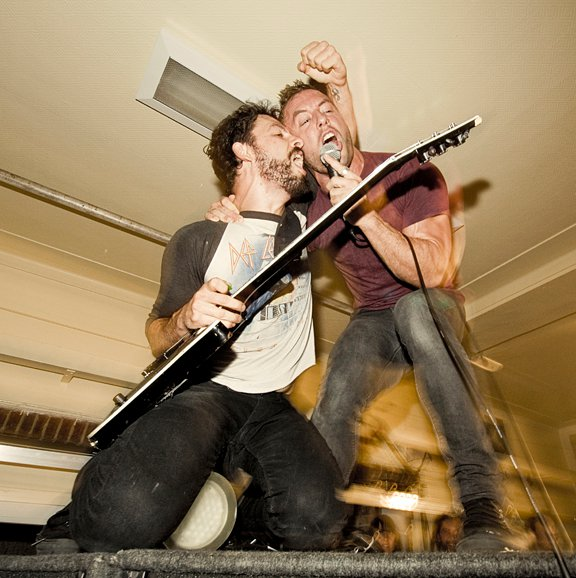
Weinman and Greg Puciato of The Dillinger Escape Plan

He is currently the manager for two times Grammy award-winning singer Kimbra who he also collaborated with on her second studio album entitled The Golden Echo.

In 2012, Weinman founded the group Giraffe Tongue Orchestra. In 2016, he released the debut album Broken Lines with it.

Weinman collaborated with rapper Wyclef Jean, contributing drums to a song which has not been released yet. Weinman also composed the scores for the films Alien Abduction, Red 48, The Survivalist, and the upcoming film Banshee.

Weinman has performed with acts such as Nine Inch Nails and System of a Down and in 2017, Weinman performed as a live guitarist/bassist for the electronic ensemble The Prodigy. He also joined Suicidal Tendencies as a fill-in guitarist on their summer 2018 tour; Weinman was later confirmed as a full-time member of Suicidal Tendencies, and he is currently working on new material with them.

== Influences and guitar technique ==
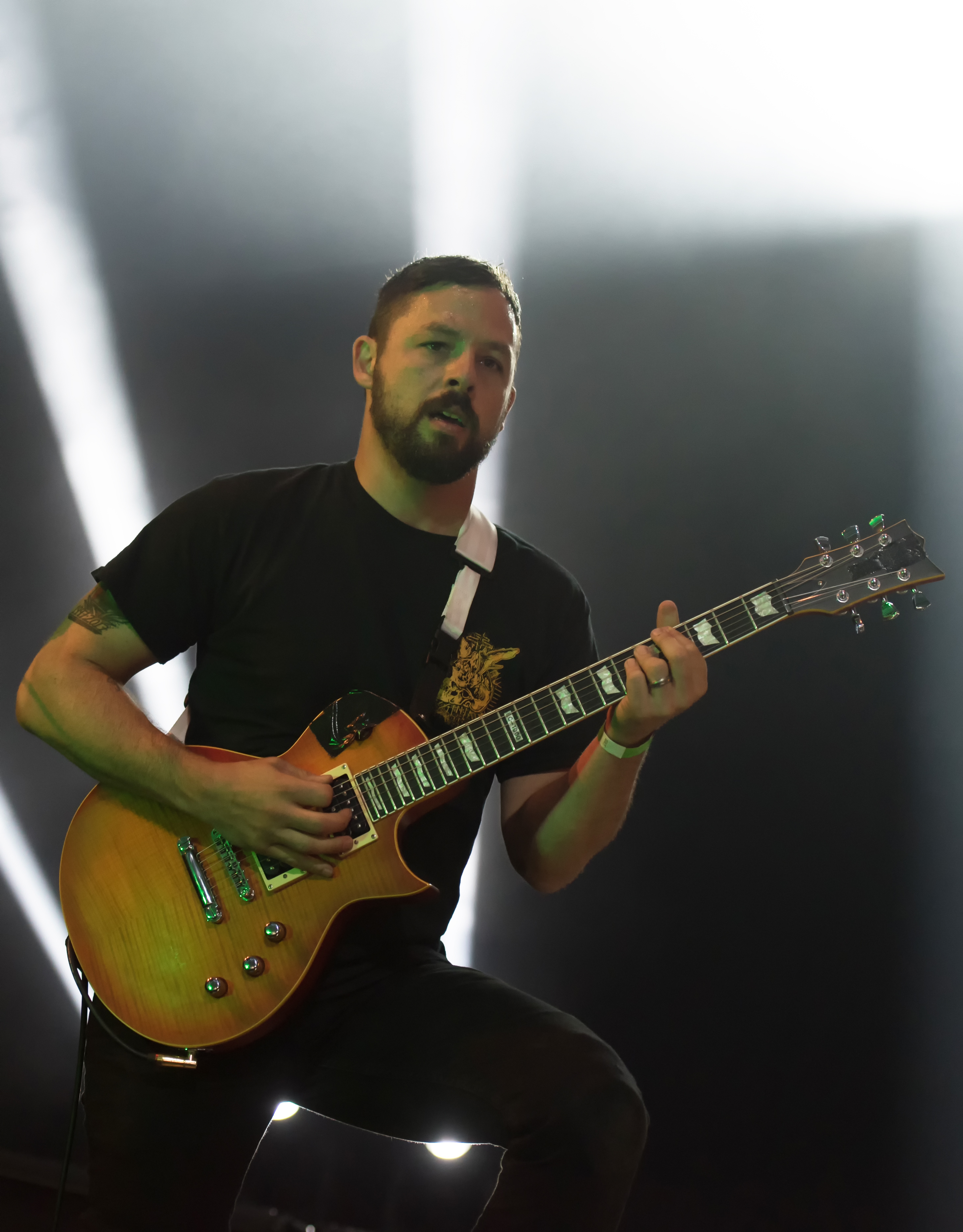
Weinman at Wacken Open Air in 2017

Ben Weinman cited John McLaughlin, Robert Fripp, Greg Ginn, Stevie Ray Vaughan, Marty Friedman, and Steve Vai as his biggest influences. Weinman acknowledges Apocalypse by McLaughlin's Mahavishnu Orchestra as the album that changed his life, stating that "It was a huge part of what led me to make Dillinger".

The guitarist cited experimental band Mr. Bungle as his biggest influence in terms of eclecticism and the irony of his music, as well as in managing tours. Weinman also named its frontman Mike Patton his favorite singer of all time.

== Equipment ==
At the 2014 NAMM Show ESP announced the release of Weinman's first signature guitar, the BW-1, which is based on the company's PS-1 "Xtone" model. He is also known for frequently playing the ESP H and MH series. Weinman has been seen using a variety of amps in the studio, ranging from a Bogner Uberschall, a Laney GH50L and a Marshall JCM, but he mainly uses Mesa/Boogie Triple Rectifiers and a Mark V for live performances. In addition to playing guitar, Weinman occasionally plays a Fender Precision Bass in live performances with The Prodigy.

== Personal life ==
Ben Weinman has an adopted son and a daughter. Following the disbandment of The Dillinger Escape Plan, he established an animal sanctuary on his home in New Jersey.. In 2024, he opened the apothecary-inspired Alkemy Coffee in Flemington, NJ with his now-wife Valentina Killough who is a certified aromatherapist and herbalist.

Weinman has supported the You Rock Foundation which seeks to spread awareness about depression and appeared in one of its video campaigns. He has been vocal about his choice not to drink, smoke or use other recreational drugs Weinman follows a pescetarian lifestyle.

== Discography ==
=== With The Dillinger Escape Plan ===
- Calculating Infinity (1999)
- Miss Machine (2004)
- Ire Works (2007)
- Option Paralysis (2010)
- One of Us Is the Killer (2013)
- Dissociation (2016)

=== With Giraffe Tongue Orchestra ===
- Broken Lines (2016)

=== Collaborations ===
Year	Artist or band	Song	Release	Additional information
2007	Benjamin Weinman & Zach Hill	"Untitled"		Available on Ben Weinman's Myspace page
2009	Ephel Duath	"Bark Loud"	Through My Dog's Eyes	Contributed programming
2012	For Sleeping or Jumping	"Beardrops"	Dead Languages	Contributed synth and drum programming
2013	Ben Weinman and Kim Thayil	"Nanna Banana"	Mansoor, Weinman, & Abasi EP	Part of Guitar World's subscription offer.
2013	Ben Weinman and Dweezil Zappa	"Vices"	Mansoor, Weinman, & Abasi EP	Part of Guitar World's subscription offer.
2014	Kimbra	"Sugar Lies"	The Golden Echo (Deluxe edition)	Contributed guitar

=== Remixes ===
Year	Artist or band	Song	Album
2007	The Secret Handshake	"Too Young (Dillinger Escape Plan Remix)"	Summer of '98
2008	Thrice	"Digital Sea (Dillinger Remix)"	Come All You Weary
2008	Lil Wayne	"Mr. Carter (Go Harder Remix)"	
2009	Candiria	"Paradigm Shift (Ben Weinman Ignite Remix)"	Toying With the Insanities: Volume II
2009	Bring Me the Horizon	"No Need For Introductions, I've Read About Girls Like You on the Backs of Toilet Doors (Benjamin Weinman)"	Suicide Season: Cut Up!
2010	Violent Soho	"Jesus Stole My Girlfriend (Dillinger Escape Plan Remix)"	
2010	Iwrestledabearonce	"Tastes Like Kevin Bacon (The Benjamin Weinman Remix)"	It's All Remixed
2011	As I Lay Dying	"Wrath Upon Ourselves (Benjamin Weinman Remix)"	Decas
2011	Whitechapel	"This Is Exile (Ben Weinman remix)"	Recorrupted
2012	Lacuna Coil	"Trip the Darkness (Ben Weinman remix)"	Underworld Awakening (Original Motion Picture Soundtrack)

== Sources ==
- Hartmann, Graham (September 14, 2016). "The Dillinger Escape Plan's Ben Weinman - Wikipedia: Fact or Fiction?" (video). Loudwire.
