= Laugh Tracks (album) =

Studio album by Knocked Loose
- Released: September 16, 2016
- Genres: Metalcore; hardcore punk
- Length: 29:10
- Label: Pure Noise
- Producer: Will Putney

Knocked Loose chronology
| Pop Culture (EP) (2014) | Laugh Tracks (2016) | A Different Shade of Blue (2019) |

Knocked Loose studio albums chronology
| Laugh Tracks (2016) | A Different Shade of Blue (2019) |

Singles from Laugh Tracks
- 1. "Deadringer" Released: July 14, 2016; 2. "Oblivion's Peak" Released: August 9, 2016; 3. "Billy No Mates / Counting Worms" Released: May 30, 2017

Laugh Tracks is the debut studio album by the American hardcore punk band Knocked Loose, released on September 16, 2016. The album was produced by Will Putney, producer and guitarist for the bands END and Fit for an Autopsy, in Belleville, New Jersey after a friend showed Knocked Loose's previous work to him and he gained a desire to produce their album.

== Reception ==
Professional ratings
Review scores
| Source | Rating |
|---|---|
| AllMusic | 3.5/5 stars |
| Distorted Sound | 3.5/5 stars |
| Exclaim! | 3/5 stars |
| KRUI-FM | 5/5 stars |
| Metal Hammer | 3/5 stars |
| Metal Injection | 9/10 stars |
| Rock Sound | 4/5 stars |
| Sputnikmusic | 3.5/5 |

The album received largely positive reviews.

On SputnikMusic, it averaged a 3.6 out of 5 stars, with one user describing it as "unadulterated rage, in sonic form". It received a rating of 9/10 from Metal Injection, calling it "one of the biggest standouts of 2016." Metal Noise praised the album noting its "fury, passion, and skill."

== Track listing ==
| No. | Title | Length |
|---|---|---|
| 1. | "Oblivions Peak" | 3:38 |
| 2. | "Deadringer" | 3:00 |
| 3. | "The Rain" (featuring Dallas Garris) | 2:56 |
| 4. | "Blood Will Have Blood" | 2:25 |
| 5. | "Counting Worms" | 1:11 |
| 6. | "My Heroes" | 2:37 |
| 7. | "Billy No Mates" (featuring Brendan Murphy of Counterparts) | 2:14 |
| 8. | "Last Words" | 2:36 |
| 9. | "No Thanks" | 2:16 |
| 10. | "A Fetish" | 2:20 |
| 11. | "Laugh Tracks" | 3:52 |

== Personnel ==
Knocked Loose

- Bryan Garris – lead vocals
- Isaac Hale – lead guitar, backing vocals
- Cole Crutchfield – rhythm guitar, backing vocals
- Kevin Otten – bass
- Kevin "Pacsun" Kaine – drums

Production

- Will Putney - production, engineering, mixing

Additional Personnel

- Tim Cayem - photography
- Billy Collier - photography
- Evan Dell - photography
- Errick Easterday - photography
- Dallas Garris - guest vocals on "The Rain"
- Brendan Murphy - guest vocals on "Billy No Mates"
- Danielle Otrakji - artwork
- Michael Silvestri - photography
- Matthew Vincent - photography
