= Moron Police =

Norwegian rock band from Oslo

- Origin: Farsund, Norway
- Genres: Progressive rock
- Years active: 2006–present
- Label: Mighty Jam Records
- Members: Sondre Skollevoll; Christian Fredrik Steen; Lars Christian Bjørknes
- Past members: Rune Stordahl; Thore Omland Pettersen
- Website: www.moronpolice.no

Moron Police is a Norwegian progressive rock group currently based in Oslo. Their musical style has been described as progressive rock/metal while borrowing heavily from other genres, most notably, pop, funk and country rock.

The band has released four studio albums: The Propaganda Machine, Defenders of the Small Yard, A Boat on the Sea and Pachinko. They have also released one EP: The Stranger and the Hightide. All Moron Police material is self-produced by the members of the band, most notably, Sondre Skollevoll and Lars Bjørknes.

== History ==
=== Formation, early years and The Propaganda Machine (2006–2012) ===
Moron Police was founded in Farsund, Norway in 2006 by Sondre Skollevoll. He was joined by Thore Omland Pettersen on drums and Rune Stordahl on bass and harsh vocals in 2008.

The band quickly gained a local following and started touring the surrounding towns and cities, culminating in them performing with the Kristiansand Symphonic Orchestra in January 2012. A recording of one of the songs was later used as the intro on their first album, The Propaganda Machine.

The Propaganda Machine was released on 21 September 2012, through self-publication via their label, Flying Panda Records. The album was followed by extensive touring across Norway, notably playing both Norway Rock Festival and Hovefestivalen after winning a "Battle of the Bands" competition in 2011

During this period, Moron Police supported acts such as Major Parkinson, Dunderbeist, Paul Di'Anno, Audrey Horne and Black Debbath.

=== Defenders of the Small Yard (2012–2014) ===
They then returned to the studio between 2012–2013 to record Defenders of the Small Yard.

Defenders of the Small Yard was released on 17 April 2014, after a successful crowdfunding via Indiegogo, garnering some positive reviews.

The album was produced and recorded by Sondre Skollevoll and Christian Holtsteen, as well as being mixed by them both, and mastered by Chris Sansom at Propeller Mastering. The album was again self-published by the band via Flying Panda Records.

This also marks the first time the band would collaborate with the artist DULK for both the cover art and the vinyl/CD release. DULK would go on to do artwork and graphics for almost every subsequent release.

=== A Boat on the Sea (2014–2019) ===
The interval between Defenders of the Small Yard and A Boat on the Sea was a transitional time for the band. Rune Stordahl left amicably in 2014 while Sondre and Thore relocated to different cities for work and studies. Sondre joined fellow progressive rock band, Major Parkinson, in 2015 on guitars and backing vocals—helping to write and perform on Blackbox and Valesa Chapter 1 & 2.

From Major Parkinson, Sondre recruited keyboardist Lars Bjørknes, and then recruited Christian Fredrik Holtsteen, who had featured as a guest on Defenders of the Small Yard, on bass. This lineup continued until the passing of founding member Thore Omland Pettersen in 2022.

The band started recording A Boat on the Sea in 2016, with drums being recorded at Duper Studio in Bergen, Norway, and recording the rest themselves in their own studio in Bergen.

A Boat on the Sea was released on 16 August 2019, to critical acclaim. It was mixed at VuDu Studios on Long Island, New York by Mike Watts and mastered by Dag Erik Nygaard in Bergen, Norway DULK returned for the artwork design. The success of the album took the band by surprise, as they had no intention of promoting the album on release. It was nominated for "Best Rock Album" and "Best Artwork" at the AIM Independent Music Awards 2020.

The band later launched a successful crowdfunding campaign to produce physical copies of the album, ending at 300% funding above their initial goal.

The band signed with the Japanese label Avalon under Marquee Inc, who released the album in Japan featuring four bonus tracks and an alternate layout.

During lockdown caused by the COVID-19 pandemic, the band performed a stripped down-version of the song "The Undersea" for The Prog Report, called Prog From Home—an online concert featuring prog artists like: Mike Portnoy, Haken and Neal Morse, among others.

A Boat on the Sea was also featured on Loudwire's list of "11 Obscure Prog Albums Just as Good as the Biggest Classics", as well as Ross Jennings' list of "10 Best New Prog Rock + Metal Bands Since 2010" for the same publication.

=== The Stranger and the Hightide EP (2019–2021) ===
In 2020 Moron Police started recording an EP called The Stranger and the Hightide at Havnelageret Studio in Bergen. In an interview, Sondre remarked that the EP was a tie-in to their next main album which would be a concept album featuring the titular character from this EP.

The Stranger and the Hightide was released on 29 October 2021. A music video was released for the track "Parachutes" on 4 December 2021, featuring behind-the-scenes footage of the recording process.

=== Death of Pettersen, Pachinko (2021–present) ===
On 16 January 2022, Moron Police released a statement on social media that founding member Thore Omland Pettersen died from injuries sustained in a car accident the day before (15 January).

On 21 August, they released a new statement explaining that the band would continue and that work on Pachinko would resume, in honor of Thore's memory. They secured the services of The Dillinger Escape Plan drummer, Billy Rymer to complete the album as a guest performer, and recording commenced in December 2022.

Pachinko was released on the 28 November 2025 to critical acclaim.

Pachinko won "Album of the Year" in The Prog Space's 2025 awards and "Progressive Rock Album of the Year" in the 2025 Prog Report Awards. The album also featured at the top of Loudwire's "The 11 Best Prog Rock Albums of 2025".

Later in 2025 they initiated a new Kickstarter to fund the physical release of the album. It was funded in less than 24 hours and exceeded their goal by 500%.

== Members ==
=== Current members ===
- Sondre Skollevoll – vocals, guitar, keyboards, writer (2006–present)
- Christian Fredrik Steen – bass (2015–present)
- Lars Christian Bjørknes – synth (2015–present)

=== Former members ===
- Rune Stordahl – bass guitar (2008–2014)
- Thore Omland Pettersen – drums (2008–2022, his death)

== Discography ==
Albums

- The Propaganda Machine – 2012
- Defenders of the Small Yard – 2014
- A Boat on the Sea – 2019
- Pachinko – 2025

EPs

- The Stranger and the Hightide (EP) – 2021
