= Splinters from an Ever-Changing Face =

Studio album by End
- Released: June 5, 2020
- Studios: Graphic Nature Audio, Belleville, New Jersey, U.S.
- Genres: Metalcore; hardcore punk; grindcore
- Length: 32:55
- Label: Closed Casket Activities
- Producer: Will Putney

End chronology
| From the Unforgiving Arms of God (2017) | Splinters from an Ever-Changing Face (2020) | The Sin of Human Frailty (2023) |

Singles from Splinters from an Ever-Changing Face
- 1. "Pariah" Released: March 26, 2020; 2. "Covet Not" Released: April 23, 2020; 3. "Fear for Me Now" Released: May 14, 2020; 4. "Hesitation Wounds" Released: June 4, 2020

Splinters from an Ever-Changing Face is the debut studio album by American hardcore punk/metalcore band End, which was released on June 5, 2020, through Closed Casket Activities. The album was recorded and produced in the Graphic Nature Audio studio by member Will Putney.

== Release ==
In early 2020, drummer Andrew McEnaney departed the band, and was replaced by ex-The Dillinger Escape Plan drummer Billy Rymer.

On March 26, 2020, the band released the new single, "Pariah", and announced their debut album "Splinters from an Ever-Changing Face" would be released through Closed Casket Activities. They released 3 more singles from the album, which were "Covet Not" on April 23, 2020, "Fear for Me Now" on May 14, 2020, and "Hesitation Wounds" on June 4, 2020. The next day, on June 5, 2020, they released their debut album, "Splinters from an Ever-Changing Face".

== Reception ==
Professional ratings
Review scores
| Source | Rating |
|---|---|
| Kerrang! | 5/5 |
| Metal Hammer | 4/5 stars |
| New Noise Magazine | 5/5 stars |

The album has received positive reviews.

"It's always difficult to predict how putative 'supergroups' like this are going to turn out. Quite often, if we're being brutally honest, the chemistry between the members simply isn't there. But, as Splinters from an Ever-Changing Face goes to show, when it is, the resultant reaction is nothing short of explosive."

— Andy Synn,

== Musical style ==
The album has been described as metalcore and hardcore punk, with mathcore and black metal influences, with Paul travers of Kerrang! saying "It's a relentless album that turns vicious ugliness into something quite beautiful". while Adam Rees of New Noise Magazine said the album "is a debilitating hardcore onslaught".

== Track listing ==
| No. | Title | Length |
|---|---|---|
| 1. | "Covet Not" | 3:04 |
| 2. | "Pariah" | 3:30 |
| 3. | "Absence" (feat. Pete Morcey) | 3:28 |
| 4. | "The Reach of Resurrection" | 2:28 |
| 5. | "Fear for Me Now" | 2:00 |
| 6. | "Hesitation Wounds" | 4:17 |
| 7. | "Captive to My Curse" | 1:49 |
| 8. | "Evening Arms" | 3:14 |
| 9. | "An Apparition" | 2:04 |
| 10. | "Every Empty Vein" | 1:45 |
| 11. | "Sands of Sleep" (feat. Tanner Merritt) | 5:19 |
| Total length: | | 32:55 |

== Personnel ==
END

- Brendan Murphy – vocals
- Will Putney – guitar
- Gregory Thomas – guitar
- Jay Pepito – bass
- Billy Rymer – drums

Production

- Will Putney – production, engineering, mixing, mastering

Additional personnel

- Adam Burke – artwork
- Steve Seid – engineer
