= Prophets (disambiguation) =

Prophets may refer to:

== People ==
- Prophet, an interpreter or spokesperson of a deity
  - Prophets in Judaism
  - Prophets of Christianity
  - Prophets of Islam - beginning with Adam and ending with Muhammad
  - LDS Prophets, modern day Prophets of The Church of Jesus Christ of Latter-day Saints

== Religious texts ==
- The Prophets, Nevi'im in Hebrew, is a collection of writings comprising the second of three main divisions in the Tanakh (Hebrew Bible; Old Testament)

== Popular culture ==
- High Prophets (Halo), The Covenant leaders in Halo 2
- Prophet (Star Trek), in the fictional Star Trek universe
- Prophets (verse novel), a 1995 verse novel by Kwame Dawes
- Prophets (album), an album by hardcore band Counterparts
