= The Difference Between Hell and Home =

Studio album by Counterparts
- Released: July 23, 2013
- Genre: Melodic hardcore; metalcore
- Length: 36:27
- Label: Victory Records
- Producer: Will Putney

Counterparts chronology
The Current Will Carry Us (2011)	The Difference Between Hell and Home (2013)	Tragedy Will Find Us (2015)

Singles from The Difference Between Hell and Home
- 1. "Witness" Released: July 9, 2013

The Difference Between Hell and Home is the third studio album by Canadian melodic hardcore band Counterparts. It was released on July 23, 2013, through Victory Records. The album received positive critical reception, generating an aggregated score of 79/100 on Metacritic, indicating "generally favorable reviews".

== Critical reception ==
Professional ratings
Aggregate scores
Source	Rating
Metacritic	(79/100)
Review scores
Source	Rating
Absolutepunk	(91%)
Kerrang	(4/5)
Rock Sound	(8/10)
Thrash Hits	5.5/6 stars

The album received positive reviews by critics. Rock Sound concluded their review by saying "This is raw feeling, distilled through true musicianship – exactly as great hardcore should be" and Thrash Hits stated "The Difference Between Hell and Home is a stunningly complete hardcore album which should be treasured by anyone with half a brain in their heads" and awarded the album with a rating of five-and-a-half stars out of six. The album currently holds a rating of 79/100 on Metacritic.

== Track listing ==
All lyrics written by Brendan Murphy

No.	Title	Music	Length
1.	"Lost"	Jesse Doreen, Alex Re	2:06
2.	"Ghost"	Doreen	3:02
3.	"Debris"	Doreen	2:45
4.	"Outlier"	Re, Doreen	3:06
5.	"Witness"	Doreen	2:54
6.	"Decay"	Doreen, Re	3:04
7.	"Compass"	Doreen	4:35
8.	"Wither"	Doreen	3:14
9.	"Cursed"	Re	3:57
10.	"Slave"	Re	2:01
11.	"Soil"	Re, Doreen	5:43
Total length:			36:27

== Personnel ==
Counterparts

- Brendan Murphy – lead vocals
- Alex Re – guitar, backing vocals, clean vocals
- Jesse Doreen – guitar/drum programming
- Eric Bazinet – bass guitar

Production

- Will Putney – Production, engineer, mixing, mastering
- Randy LeBoeuf – additional engineering
