= A Different Shade of Blue =

Studio album by Knocked Loose
- Released: August 23, 2019
- Recorded: Graphic Nature
- Genres: Metalcore; heavy hardcore; sludge metal
- Length: 37:59
- Label: Pure Noise

Knocked Loose chronology
Laugh Tracks (2016)	A Different Shade of Blue (2019)	A Tear in the Fabric of Life (2021)

Knocked Loose studio albums chronology
Laugh Tracks (2016)	A Different Shade of Blue (2019)	You Won't Go Before You're Supposed To (2024)

Singles from A Different Shade of Blue
- 1. "Mistakes Like Fractures" Released: April 4, 2019; 2. "...And Still I Wander South" Released: May 23, 2019

A Different Shade of Blue is the second studio album by the American hardcore punk band Knocked Loose. It was released through Pure Noise Records on August 23, 2019, and produced by Will Putney. It was the last album to feature rhythm guitarist Cole Crutchfield before his departure in 2020.

== Musical style ==
The album merges the styles of hardcore punk and heavy metal. It has been categorised as genres such as metalcore, heavy hardcore and sludgecore. It often borders the sounds of Swedish death metal and groove metal.

Kris Pugh of Distorted Sound magazine described it as putting the band "at the apex of modern hardcore". In an article for Kerrang!, Dan Slessor says that in comparison to the band's previous album: "It’s more hardcore, more metal, there are more fast parts, more breakdowns, more malice, more unease and, perhaps most importantly, more energy". In an article for New Noise magazine, Caleb R Newton said that "There is not a single moment on A Different Shade of Blue that’s not packed to the brim with musical (and thematic!) brutality". However, Connor Atkinson for Exclaim! described "Mistakes Like Fractures" as "overtly catchy".

== Critical reception ==
Professional ratings
Review scores
Source	Rating
AllMusic	3.5/5 stars
Dead Press!	8/10
Distorted Sound	9/10
Exclaim!	9/10
Kerrang!	4/5 stars
NME	4/5 stars
Sputnikmusic	4/5

The album generally received positive reviews.

=== Accolades ===
Accolades for A Different Shade of Blue
Publication	Accolade	Rank
Alternative Press	The 50 Best Albums of 2019	18
Loudwire	The 66 Best Metal Albums of the Decade: 2010–2019	31
Loudwire	The 50 Best Metal Albums of 2019	Unranked
Revolver	25 Best Albums of 2019	4
What Culture	15 Best Metal Albums of 2019	7

== Track listing ==
All tracks are written by Knocked Loose.

A Different Shade of Blue track listing
No.	Title	Length
1.	"Belleville"	3:16
2.	"Trapped in the Grasp of a Memory"	3:53
3.	"A Serpent's Touch" (featuring Emma Boster of Dying Wish)	3:02
4.	"By the Grave"	3:05
5.	"In the Walls"	3:02
6.	"Guided by the Moon"	3:48
7.	"Mistakes like Fractures"	3:39
8.	"Forget Your Name" (featuring Keith Buckley)	2:42
9.	"Road 23"	2:12
10.	"...And Still I Wander South"	3:42
11.	"Denied by Fate"	2:23
12.	"Misguided Son"	3:15

Japan Bonus Tracks
No.	Title	Length
13.	"Slings and Arrows (The Warriors cover, Mistakes Like Fractures b-side)"	2:16
14.	"All My Friends (re-recorded, Mistakes Like Fractures b-side)"	2:26

== Personnel ==
Knocked Loose

- Bryan Garris – vocals
- Isaac Hale – lead guitar, vocals
- Cole Crutchfield – rhythm guitar, backing vocals
- Kevin Otten – bass
- Kevin "Pacsun" Kaine – drums

Additional contributors

- Will Putney – recording, mixing, mastering
- Ridge Rhine – artwork
- Emma Boster – additional vocals on "A Serpent's Touch"
- Keith Buckley – additional vocals on "Forget Your Name"

== Charts ==
Chart performance for A Different Shade of Blue
Chart (2019)	Peak position
Scottish Albums (OCC)	41
UK Album Sales (OCC)	26
UK Digital Albums (OCC)	66
UK Physical Albums (OCC)	27
UK Independent Albums (OCC)	5
UK Rock & Metal Albums (OCC)	3
US Billboard 200	26
