= Impermanence (disambiguation) =

Impermanence is philosophical concept addressed in a variety of religions and philosophies.

Impermanence may refer to:

== Music ==
=== Albums ===
- Impermanence (Meredith Monk album), 2008
- Impermanence (Peter Silberman album), 2017

=== Songs ===
- "Impermanence", by Architects on the album For Those That Wish to Exist
- "Impermanence", by Assemblage 23 on the album Compass
- "Impermanence", by Bryce Dessner and the Australian String Quartet on the album Impermanence/Disintegration
- "Impermanence", by Joep Beving on the album Prehension
- "Impermanence", by Major Parkinson on the album Twilight Cinema
- "Impermanence", by Max Cooper on the album Emergence
- "Impermanence", by Peter Silberman on the album Impermanence
- "Impermanence", by Ride on the album Weather Diaries
