= Laugh Tracks =

A laugh track is canned laughter

Laugh Track or Laugh Tracks may refer to:

- Laugh Tracks, an album by Tim Cohen 2010
- Laugh Tracks (Knocked Loose album), 2016

== See also ==
- Risas enlatadas (Laugh Tracks) Javier Calvo short-story compilation 2001
- Laugh Track, a 2023 studio album by American band The National
