= Absolute Hope Absolute Hell =

Studio album by Fit for an Autopsy
- Released: October 2, 2015
- Studio: Graphic Nature Audio, Belleville, New Jersey
- Genre: Deathcore
- Length: 40:12
- Label: eOne Music
- Producer: Will Putney

Fit for an Autopsy chronology
Hellbound (2013)	Absolute Hope Absolute Hell (2015)	The Great Collapse (2017)

Singles from Absolute Hope Absolute Hell
- 1. "Absolute Hope Absolute Hell" Released: August 21, 2015; 2. "Saltwound" Released: September 4, 2015

Absolute Hope Absolute Hell is the third studio album by American deathcore band Fit for an Autopsy. The album was released on October 2, 2015 through eOne Music and was produced by the band's guitarist Will Putney. It is the first album to feature vocalist Joe Badolato after previous vocalists Nate Johnson and Greg Wilburn both departed the band in 2014.

Some consider it to be an essential release in the deathcore style.

== Reception ==
In 2021, Eli Enis of Revolver included the album in their list of "15 Essential Deathcore Albums", where they wrote: "With a triple-guitar attack, super tight instrumentation and smart songwriting choices, Fit for an Autopsy add all sorts of textures and dynamics to the deathcore idiom without ever relying on wanking technicality."

Professional ratings
Review scores
Source	Rating
Blabbermouth.net	6/10
Louder Sound	3.5/5 stars
Metal Injection	7.5/10
MetalSucks	5/5 stars
New Transcendence	7.5/10

== Track listing ==
All tracks are written by Will Putney

No.	Title	Length
1.	"Absolute Hope Absolute Hell"	4:27
2.	"Wither"	3:18
3.	"Saltwound"	3:52
4.	"Murder in the First"	3:26
5.	"Storm Drains" (featuring Brendan Murphy of Counterparts)	3:33
6.	"Ghosts in the River"	3:41
7.	"Mask Maker"	4:10
8.	"Hollow Shell"	3:10
9.	"Out to Sea"	2:26
10.	"False Positive"	3:05
11.	"Swing the Axe"	5:00
Total length:		40:12

== Personnel ==
Credits adapted from album's liner notes.

Fit for an Autopsy

- Joe Badolato – lead vocals
- Will Putney – guitars, bass
- Pat Sheridan – guitars, backing vocals
- Tim Howley – guitars
- Josean Orta – drums

Additional musicians

- Brendan Murphy – guest vocals on "Storm Drains"

Additional personnel

- Will Putney – production, engineering, mixing, mastering
- Randy Leboeuf – additional engineering
- Tom Smith, Jr. – additional engineering
- Steve Seid – editing
- Robert W. Cook (norot-art.com) – artwork

== Charts ==
Chart (2015)	Peak position
US Independent Albums (Billboard)	29
US Top Hard Rock Albums (Billboard)	18
US Heatseekers Albums (Billboard)	3
US Top Rock Albums (Billboard)	48
