= A Tear in the Fabric of Life =

EP by Knocked Loose
- Released: October 13, 2021
- Recorded: 2021
- Genres: Metalcore, hardcore punk
- Length: 20:57
- Label: Pure Noise
- Producer: Will Putney

Knocked Loose chronology
A Different Shade of Blue (2019)	A Tear in the Fabric of Life (2021)	You Won't Go Before You're Supposed To (2024)

Professional ratings
Review scores
Source	Rating
Distorted Sound	9/10
Kerrang!	4/5
Pitchfork	7.5/10
PopMatters	8/10
Sputnikmusic	4/5

A Tear in the Fabric of Life is an EP by the American hardcore punk band Knocked Loose, released on October 13, 2021, through Pure Noise Records. The record was accompanied by an animated short film directed by Magnus Jonsson, with the EP and film depicting "the stages of grief in musical form".

== Track listing ==
All tracks are written by Knocked Loose.

No.	Title	Length
1.	"Where Light Divides the Holler"	3:43
2.	"God Knows"	3:36
3.	"Forced to Stay"	3:55
4.	"Contorted in the Faille"	3:56
5.	"Return to Passion"	1:14
6.	"Permanent"	4:42
Total length:		20:57

=== Notes ===
- Tracks 1 and 2 both include uncredited samples of "God Only Knows" by The Beach Boys. Both samples were removed from the digital release of the album, but exist on the Bandcamp release, physical releases, and the animated film.

== Personnel ==
=== Knocked Loose ===
- Bryan Garris - vocals
- Isaac Hale - lead guitar
- Cole Crutchfield - rhythm guitar
- Kevin Otten - bass
- Kevin Kaine - drums

=== Additional musician ===
- Additional vocals on "God Knows" by Matt King

=== Production ===
- Will Putney - production
- Steve Seid - additional engineering
- Magnus Jonsson - artwork, film direction
