= Oh What the Future Holds =

Studio album by Fit for an Autopsy
- Released: January 14, 2022
- Genre: Deathcore, progressive death metal
- Length: 45:13
- Label: Nuclear Blast
- Producer: Will Putney

Fit for an Autopsy chronology
The Sea of Tragic Beasts (2019)	Oh What the Future Holds (2022)	The Nothing That Is (2024)

Singles from Oh What the Future Holds
- 1. "Far from Heaven" Released: September 23, 2021; 2. "Pandora" Released: October 28, 2021; 3. "In Shadows" Released: December 2, 2021; 4. "Two Towers" Released: January 6, 2022

Oh What the Future Holds is the sixth studio album by American deathcore band Fit for an Autopsy. The album was released on January 14, 2022, through Nuclear Blast and was produced by the band's guitarist Will Putney. It has received positive reviews from critics.

Professional ratings
Review scores
Source	Rating
Blabbermouth.net	9/10
Distorted Sound	9/10
Kerrang!	3/5 stars
Loud	70/100
Louder Sound	4.5/5 stars
Metal Storm	8.3/10
New Transcendence	7/10
Rock Sins	8/10
Wall of Sound	9/10

== Track listing ==
All tracks are written by Fit for an Autopsy.

Oh What the Future Holds track listing
No.	Title	Length
1.	"Oh What the Future Holds"	2:51
2.	"Pandora"	4:36
3.	"Far from Heaven"	4:44
4.	"In Shadows"	3:57
5.	"Two Towers"	5:46
6.	"A Higher Level of Hate"	4:07
7.	"Collateral Damage"	4:15
8.	"Savages"	4:00
9.	"Conditional Healing"	3:58
10.	"The Man That I Was Not"	6:54
Total length:		45:13

== Personnel ==
Credits adapted from album's liner notes.

Fit for an Autopsy

- Joe Badolato – lead vocals
- Will Putney – guitars, production, engineering, mixing, mastering
- Pat Sheridan – guitars, backing vocals
- Tim Howley – guitars
- Peter "Blue" Spinazola – bass
- Matt Guglielmo – drums

== Charts ==
Chart (2022)	Peak position
US Billboard 200	23
US Top Hard Rock Albums (Billboard)	3
US Heatseekers Albums (Billboard)	2
