= You Won't Go Before You're Supposed To =

Studio album by Knocked Loose
- Released: May 10, 2024
- Recorded: 2023–2024
- Studio: Studio 606 (Los Angeles)
- Genres: Metalcore; hardcore punk
- Length: 27:28
- Label: Pure Noise
- Producer: Drew Fulk

Knocked Loose chronology
A Tear in the Fabric of Life (2021)	You Won't Go Before You're Supposed To (2024)

Knocked Loose studio albums chronology
A Different Shade of Blue (2019)	You Won't Go Before You're Supposed To (2024)

Singles from You Won't Go Before You're Supposed To
- 1. "Blinding Faith" Released: February 27, 2024; 2. "Don't Reach for Me" Released: April 3, 2024; 3. "Suffocate" Released: April 23, 2024

You Won't Go Before You're Supposed To is the third studio album by the American hardcore punk band Knocked Loose. It was released through Pure Noise Records on May 10, 2024, and produced by Drew Fulk.

== Background ==
Guitarist Nicko Calderon joined the band in 2021. The band released an EP titled, A Tear in the Fabric of Life that same year. According to vocalist Bryan Garris:

"A Tear In The Fabric Of Life' was the first time that we sat down and wrote with strict intention...So coming back around, figuring out what we should be, and then applying that to a full album was very interesting...We knew we wanted to have a bigger album in scale, and with that in mind, we could expect every single type of Knocked Loose song there is."

The title of the album was inspired by a stranger on a plane who was sitting next to Garris on a particularly turbulent flight, who calmly said to the anxious singer "You won’t go before you’re supposed to."

== Release ==
The band announced the album and its release of May 10, 2024. The lead single, "Blinding Faith", was released on February 27, 2024. The second single, "Don't Reach for Me" was released on April 3, 2024. The third single, "Suffocate" featuring Poppy, was released on April 23, 2024.

== Composition ==
You Won't Go Before You're Supposed To has been described as metalcore and hardcore punk, with elements of nu metal.

== Critical reception ==
Professional ratings
Aggregate scores
Source	Rating
Metacritic	87/100
Review scores
Source	Rating
AllMusic	3.5/5 stars
Distorted Sound Magazine	9/10
Exclaim!	7/10
The Guardian	5/5 stars
Kerrang!	5/5 stars
Metal Hammer	4.5/5 stars
Metal Injection	8.5/10
MetalSucks	4.5/5 stars
Pitchfork	8.0/10
Sputnikmusic	3.8/5

According to the review aggregator Metacritic, You Won't Go Before You're Supposed To received "universal acclaim" based on a weighted average score of 87 out of 100 from 8 critic scores. AllMusic felt that the album "[upped] the intensity of their relentless metalcore sound". Ellis Heasley of Distorted Sound Magazine compared it to Slipknot's Iowa "in its complete disregard for what a band with this much hype is supposed to do in this situation...and ultimately stands as further irrefutable proof of a truly generational talent." Manus Hopkins writing for Exclaim! stated that "at only 10 songs, with the longest still falling short of five minutes, You Won't Go Before You're Supposed To doesn't wear out its welcome." But they felt that "Slaughterhouse 2", featuring Chris Motionless, was "slightly underwhelming in the shadow of its predecessor", from Motionless in White's album, Scoring the End of the World. Ben Beaumont-Thomas of The Guardian called it "an indulgently rich record that keeps revealing more on double-digit listens." According to Luke Morton of Kerrang!, "the heaviness throughout is unrelenting. No acoustic number, no ballad, no concession... this isn't just their best record yet, it's one of the best albums of the year." Stephen Hill of Metal Hammer of praised Drew Fulk's production stating, [his] production gives the record perfect definition while making it sound as loud as a jet plane taking off inside your cranium."

According to Caitlin McMahon of Metal Injection, "Knocked Loose has embraced a melodic direction with this record," and called the album "eerie and unsettling." Mandy Scythe of MetalSucks wrote, "From start to finish, this is a solid, heavy record full of memorable and catchy moments that you'll want to revisit time and time again." According, to Ian Cohen of Pitchfork, "[Knocked Loose have] amplified and concentrated their sound into something so potent that it has its own gravitational pull." Dylan Tuck writing for The Skinny wrote, "You Won't Go Before You're Supposed To takes their staunchly savage sound and dashes it with piercing playfulness and crushing confidence; conjuring a profoundly poisonous record containing some of their most deadly moments to date." Sputnikmusic wrote that "[the] album destroys as much as possible while it's on...[but] it leaves a little to be desired once it's over."

== Track listing ==
All tracks are written by Knocked Loose (Bryan Garris, Isaac Hale, Nicko Calderon, Kevin Otten, and Kevin Kaine).

You Won't Go Before You're Supposed To track listing
No.	Title	Length
1.	"Thirst"	1:46
2.	"Piece by Piece"	2:51
3.	"Suffocate" (featuring Poppy)	2:44
4.	"Don't Reach for Me"	3:45
5.	"Moss Covers All"	0:46
6.	"Take Me Home"	2:15
7.	"Slaughterhouse 2" (featuring Chris Motionless)	3:03
8.	"The Calm That Keeps You Awake"	2:41
9.	"Blinding Faith"	2:51
10.	"Sit & Mourn"	4:46
Total length:		27:28

== Personnel ==
Knocked Loose

- Bryan Garris – lead vocals
- Isaac Hale – lead guitar, harsh vocals
- Nicko Calderon – rhythm guitar, backing vocals
- Kevin Otten – bass
- Kevin "Pacsun" Kaine – drums

Additional personnel

- Poppy – vocals (3)
- Chris Motionless – additional vocals (7)

Technical

- Drew Fulk – production, mixing, mastering
- Bryan Garris – lyrics
- Zach Tuch – additional production, engineering
- Jeff Dunne – mixing, mastering
- Jesse Field – engineering assistance, editing

== Charts ==
=== Weekly charts ===
Weekly chart performance for You Won't Go Before You're Supposed To
Chart (2024)	Peak position
Australian Albums (ARIA)	14
Austrian Albums (Ö3 Austria)	16
Belgian Albums (Ultratop Flanders)	82
German Albums (Offizielle Top 100)	16
Scottish Albums (Official Charts)	7
UK Albums (Official Charts)	43
UK Independent Albums (Official Charts)	5
UK Rock & Metal Albums (Official Charts)	1
US Billboard 200	23

=== Year-end charts ===
Year-end chart performance for You Won't Go Before You're Supposed To
Chart (2024)	Position
US Top Hard Rock Albums (Billboard)	40
