= The Great Collapse =

Studio album by Fit for an Autopsy
- Released: March 17, 2017
- Studio: Graphic Nature Audio, Belleville, New Jersey
- Genre: Deathcore
- Length: 39:51
- Label: eOne Music
- Producer: Will Putney

Fit for an Autopsy chronology
Absolute Hope Absolute Hell (2015)	The Great Collapse (2017)	The Sea of Tragic Beasts (2019)

Singles from The Great Collapse
- 1. "Heads Will Hang" Released: January 30, 2017; 2. "Iron Moon" Released: February 17, 2017; 3. "Black Mammoth" Released: March 10, 2017

The Great Collapse is the fourth studio album by American deathcore band Fit for an Autopsy. The album was released on March 17, 2017, through eOne Music and was produced by the band's guitarist Will Putney.

Professional ratings
Review scores
Source	Rating
Distorted Sound	10/10
Exclaim!	9/10
KillYourStereo	Positive
Louder Sound	3.5/5 stars
MetalSucks	4.5/5 stars
New Transcendence	9/10

== Track listing ==
All tracks are written by Fit for an Autopsy.

No.	Title	Length
1.	"Hydra"	4:16
2.	"Heads Will Hang"	4:13
3.	"Black Mammoth"	4:38
4.	"Terraform"	3:47
5.	"Iron Moon" (featuring Kevin McCaughey of Ion Dissonance)	3:18
6.	"When the Bulbs Burn Out"	4:14
7.	"Too Late"	4:14
8.	"Empty Still"	5:44
9.	"Spiral"	5:24
Total length:		39:51

== Personnel ==
Credits adapted from album's liner notes.

Fit for an Autopsy

- Joe Badolato – lead vocals
- Will Putney – guitars, bass
- Pat Sheridan – guitars, backing vocals
- Tim Howley – guitars
- Josean Orta – drums

Additional musicians

- Kevin McCaughey of Ion Dissonance – guest vocals on "Iron Moon"

Additional personnel

- Will Putney – production, engineering, mixing, mastering
- Steve Seid – engineering, editing
- Jason Inguagiato – assistant
- Adam Burke – artwork

== Charts ==
Chart (2017)	Peak position
US Billboard 200	199
US Top Hard Rock Albums (Billboard)	13
US Heatseekers Albums (Billboard)	2
