= Little Heart Records =

- Founded: 2005
- Founder: Bryan Puckett
- Status: Defunct
- Genre: Hardcore punk, metalcore, alternative rock
- Country of origin: United States
- Location: Louisville, Kentucky
- Official website: Official Website

Little Heart Records was an independent record label based in Louisville, Kentucky. It was founded in 2005 by Bryan Puckett. The label focused on supporting underground and emerging artists in the hardcore punk, metalcore, punk rock, and alternative rock scenes.

== History ==
Little Heart Records was established with the goal of offering artist-friendly contracts and financial support to independent musicians. Over its 11-year run, the label signed more than 30 North American bands and released hundreds of records.

The label gained recognition for its dedication to underground music, releasing records by bands such as Knocked Loose, Greyhaven, and On My Honor. Despite its success in supporting independent artists, Little Heart Records eventually ceased operations after the passing of its founder, Bryan Puckett.

== Notable releases ==
Some of the most well-known releases from Little Heart Records include:

- Pop Culture (EP) – Knocked Loose (2014)
- Cult America – Greyhaven (2014)
- Nature & Nurture – On My Honor (2011)
- Till Death Do Us Party – Uh-Huh Baby Yeah! (2016)

== Legacy ==
Little Heart Records played a pivotal role in shaping the Louisville underground music scene. Its artist-friendly approach and dedication to independent musicians left a lasting impact on the hardcore and metalcore communities.
