= The Nothing That Is =

2024 studio album by Fit for an Autopsy

Studio album by Fit for an Autopsy
- Released: October 25, 2024
- Genre: Deathcore, progressive death metal
- Length: 43:25
- Label: Nuclear Blast
- Producer: Will Putney

Fit for an Autopsy chronology
Oh What the Future Holds (2022)	The Nothing That Is (2024)

Singles from The Nothing That Is
- 1. "Hostage" Released: July 26, 2024; 2. "Saviour of None / Ashes of All" Released: August 27, 2024; 3. "Lower Purpose" Released: October 10, 2024

Professional ratings
Review scores
Source	Rating
Metal Storm	7.7/10

The Nothing That Is is the seventh studio album by American deathcore band Fit for an Autopsy. The album was released on October 25, 2024, through Nuclear Blast. The album was produced by the band's guitarist Will Putney.

== Track listing ==
The Nothing That Is track listing
No.	Title	Length
1.	"Hostage"	4:39
2.	"Spoils of the Horde"	4:16
3.	"Savior of None / Ashes of All"	4:14
4.	"Weaker Wolves"	3:08
5.	"Red Horizon"	5:04
6.	"The Nothing That Is"	4:06
7.	"Lurch"	5:03
8.	"Lower Purpose"	3:11
9.	"Lust for the Severed Head"	3:17
10.	"The Silver Sun"	6:24
Total length:		43:25

== Personnel ==
Fit for an Autopsy

- Joe Badolato – vocals
- Will Putney – guitars, production, engineering, composition
- Pat Sheridan – guitars
- Tim Howley – guitars
- Peter "Blue" Spinazola – bass
- Josean Orta – drums

== Charts ==
Chart performance for The Nothing That Is
Chart (2024)	Peak position
Australian Vinyl Albums (ARIA)	17
Austrian Albums (Ö3 Austria)	66
German Albums (Offizielle Top 100)	76
UK Album Downloads (OCC)	75
UK Independent Albums (OCC)	49
UK Rock & Metal Albums (OCC)	15
US Heatseekers Albums (Billboard)	9
