= Knocked Loose =

American hardcore punk band

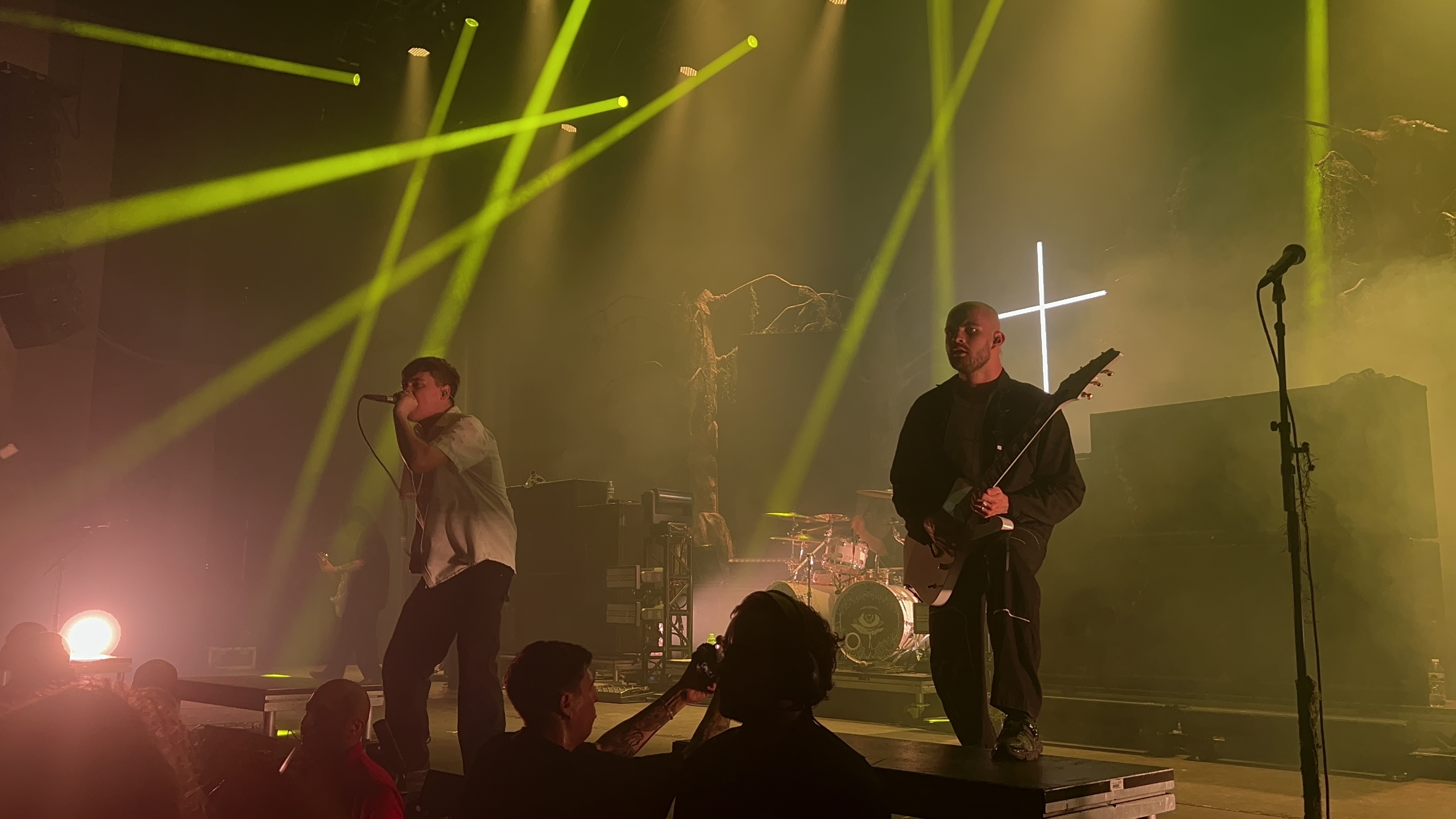
- Knocked Loose in 2024

Background information
- Origin: Oldham County, Kentucky, U.S.
- Genres: Metalcore; hardcore punk; beatdown hardcore
- Years active: 2013–present
- Labels: Pure Noise; No Luck; Little Heart
- Spinoffs: XweaponX, Everybody Dies, Inclination
- Members: Bryan Garris; Isaac Hale; Kevin Otten; Kevin "Pacsun" Kaine; Nicko Calderon
- Past members: Dylan Isaacs; Nate Woods; Cole Crutchfield
- Website: knockedloosehc.com

Knocked Loose is an American hardcore punk band from Oldham County, Kentucky, formed in 2013 and currently signed to Pure Noise Records. The band released their debut studio album, Laugh Tracks, in September 2016 through Pure Noise Records, which was followed by A Different Shade of Blue in 2019. Their 2021 EP A Tear in the Fabric of Life incorporated elements of death metal and was released to widespread critical acclaim. They released their third album, You Won't Go Before You're Supposed To, in 2024, earning high praise from critics, and topping the UK Hard Rock & Metal chart for the first time.

== History ==
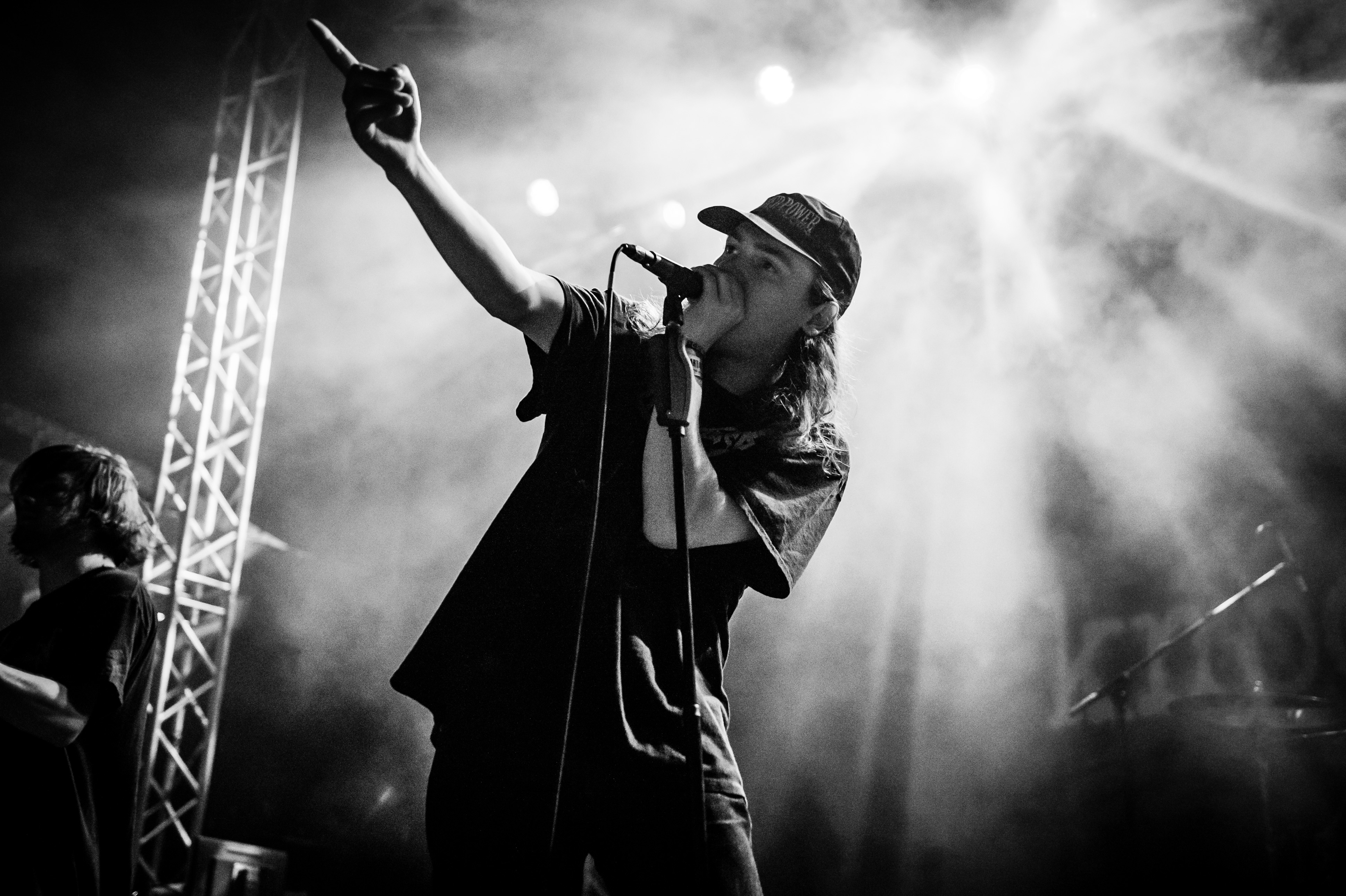
Hale (left) and Garris (right) in 2018

=== 2013–2016: Formative year, demo and Pop Culture ===
Knocked Loose was formed in June 2013 under the band name Manipulator by vocalist Bryan Garris, guitarist Isaac Hale, bassist Kevin Otten and drummer Dylan Isaacs. Except for Isaacs, the members had already played in the band Speaker together, with Jared Barron on drums. Shortly after announcing their debut show for July 26, they were contacted by a different band with the name Manipulator and decided to change their name to "Knocked Loose". The band's first song, titled "Manipulator", was released in August 2013. On October 24, Little Heart Records announced that they had signed Knocked Loose and the band released their next song, titled "The Have Nots", that same month. Both songs were released once more in October 2014 as 2013 Demo's.

Their debut EP, titled Pop Culture, was released in 2014 on Little Heart Records. Knocked Loose also contributed the song "SS" to the Little Heart Records sampler I Would Have Waited an Eternity for This, which was released on that year's Warped Tour. The band spent most of their early years touring excessively through the United States. In 2015, they released a split with Damaged Goods on No Luck Records (and digitally via Little Heart).

In the spring of 2016, Knocked Loose supported Counterparts on their headlining tour. Gideon & Expire also joined up as support. The band then supported The Acacia Strain on their 2016 Common Vision Tour, along with Oceano, Culture Killer and To the Wind. That fall, the band supported Stick to Your Guns on their Better Ash than Dust tour with Stray from the Path and Expire.

=== 2016–2021: Laugh Tracks and A Different Shade of Blue ===
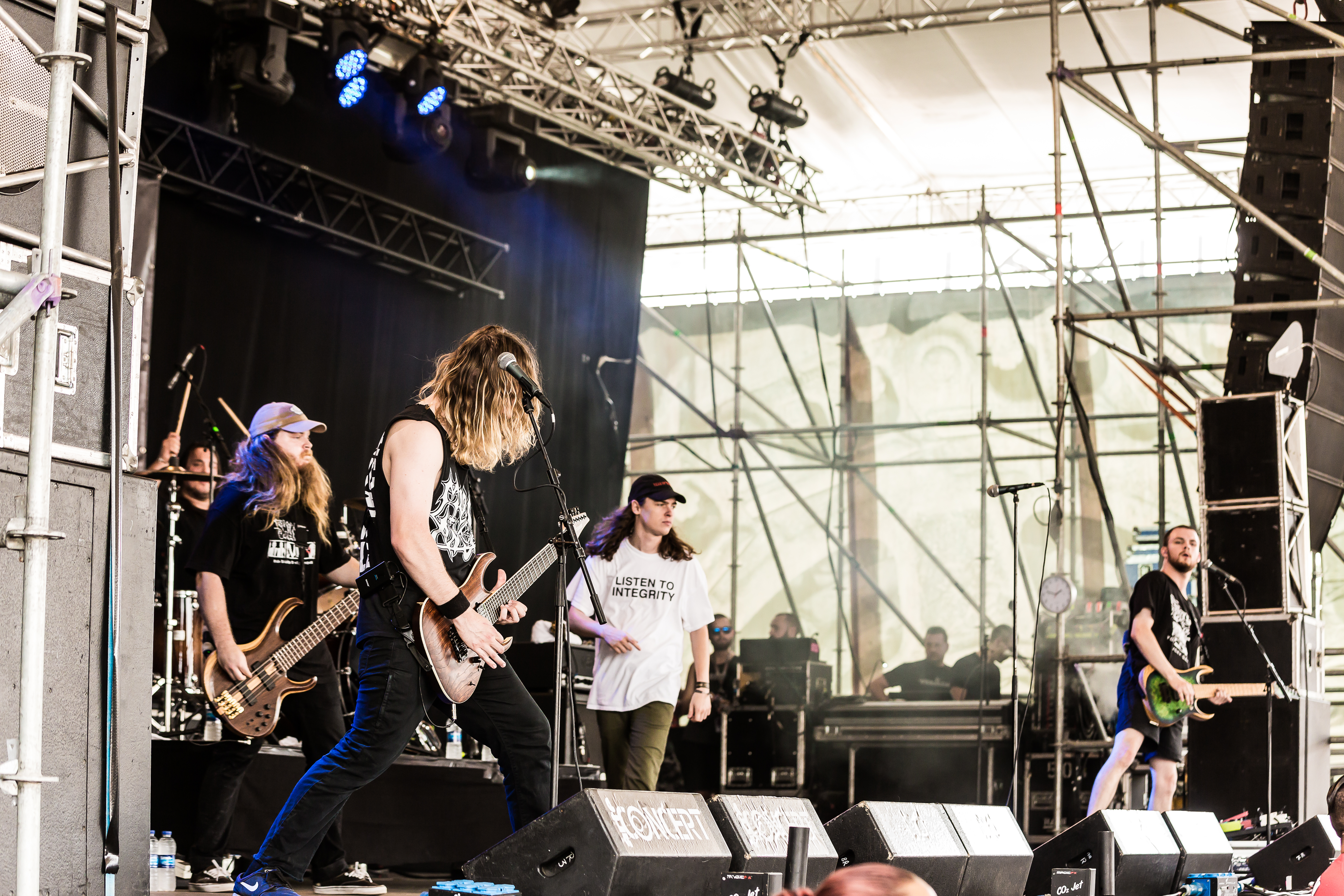
Knocked Loose performing live in 2018

In 2016, the band announced their first studio album, titled Laugh Tracks, would be released by Pure Noise Records, who they had signed to earlier that year. The album was released on September 16, 2016. On August 9, 2016, Knocked Loose premiered a new song off their upcoming album titled "Oblivions Peak." On May 31, 2017, the band released a music video for two combined songs from Laugh Tracks, "Billy No Mates / Counting Worms", with the video beginning with Billy No Mates and instantaneously moving into Counting Worms.

On June 6, 2017, Knocked Loose were announced to be supporting Every Time I Die along with Hollow Earth for a late 2017 tour of the United States, spanning September and October. A month later, in July 2017, the band announced a November UK tour, also supporting Every Time I Die but instead playing alongside Canadian hardcore band Comeback Kid for a select few dates. In the summer of 2017, Knocked Loose played every date of the Vans Warped Tour on the Full Sail stage alongside bands such as Trophy Eyes, Boston Manor, and Movements. Knocked Loose opened up for Eighteen Visions for two shows in December 2017 with Old Wounds and Tourniquet. In late 2017, the band announced their first US headlining tour for early 2018 with support from hardcore bands Terror and Jesus Piece, and label-mates Stone. However, before the tour, after members of Stone were accused of sexual assault, Knocked Loose dropped them from the tour and replaced them with Year of the Knife.

Most of the dates of their first headliner were sold out which allowed them to open for Parkway Drive and for Thy Art Is Murder on their European tours and also to play a few dates on the main stage of the last Warped Tour. In the fall of 2018, Knocked Loose opened up for Beartooth on their Disease tour with Sylar. Knocked Loose then embarked on a headliner in the Spring of 2019. The Acacia Strain, Harm's Way, Sanction and Higher Power all joined up as support. Knocked Loose then supported A Day to Remember in the Summer of 2019 with Boston Manor.

Knocked Loose's second record, A Different Shade of Blue, was released on August 23, 2019. In support of the new record, the band embarked on a massive USA headliner throughout the fall of 2019. Stick to Your Guns, Rotting Out, Candy and SeeYouSpaceCowboy all joined up on the tour as support.

Knocked Loose went on a headline tour with Gatecreeper, Magnitude and Kharma in Fall 2021. The band then opened up for Gojira on their Fall 2021 tour with Alien Weaponry.

=== 2021–2023: A Tear in the Fabric of Life and Upon Loss Singles ===
In October 2021, the band, without any prior notice, released their EP A Tear In The Fabric Of Life. The concept record documents the "story of someone wading through ‘extreme grief'". An animated short film, which accompanies the entire span of the EP, was released at the same time. It was directed by Swedish director Magnus Jonsson. The release, as well as the short film, gained mostly positive reviews. Its song "God Knows" was elected by Loudwire as the 30th best metal song of 2021.

On June 14, 2023, the band surprise released Upon Loss Singles, a double-single consisting of the tracks "Deep in the Willow" and "Everything Is Quiet Now", with the tracks being produced by new collaborator Drew Fulk (also known as WZRD BLD). The band toured in 2023 with Motionless in White supporting on select dates.

=== 2024–present: You Won't Go Before You're Supposed To ===
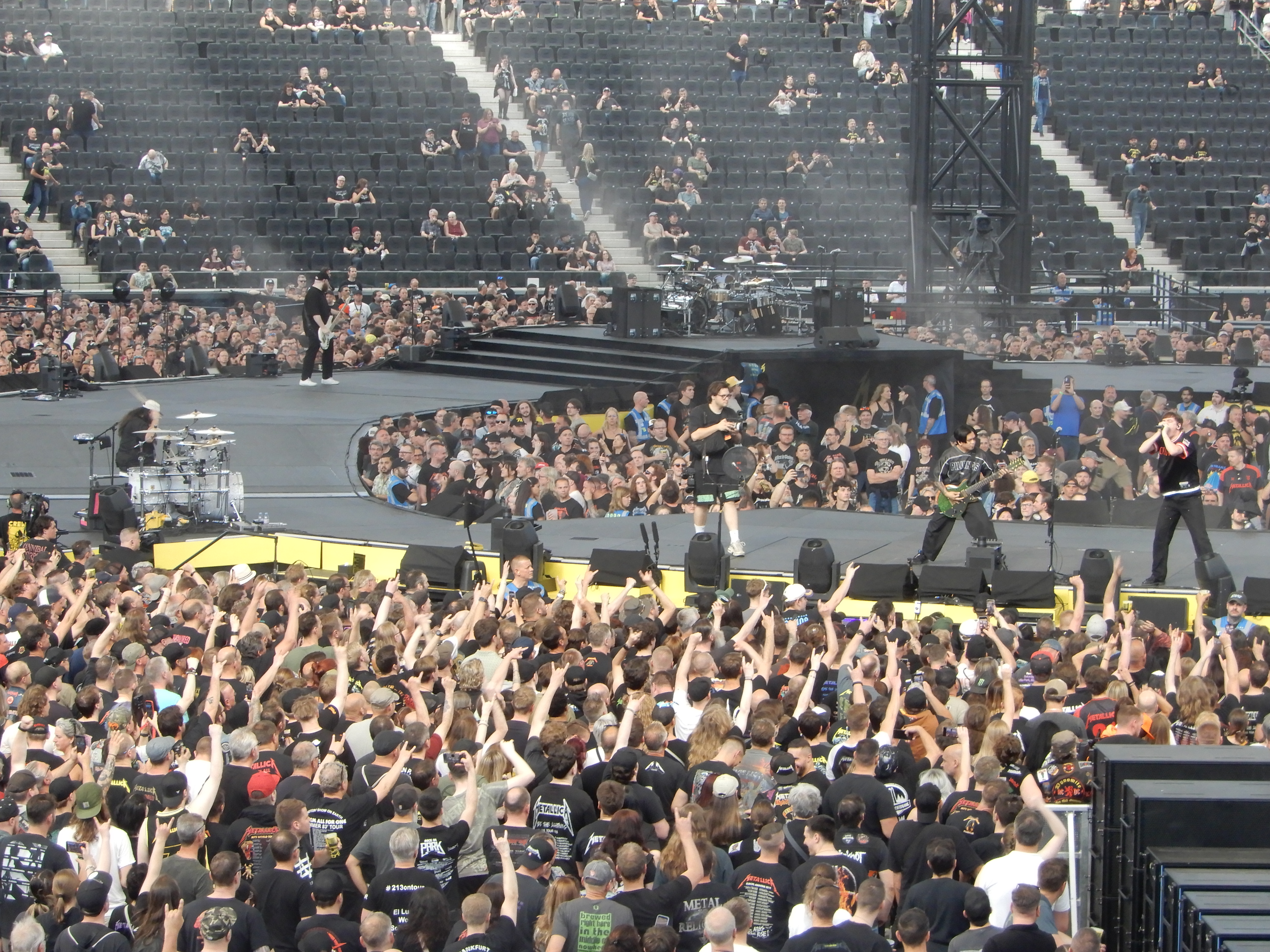
Knocked Loose performing live in 2026

On February 27, 2024, the band announced a new album entitled You Won't Go Before You're Supposed To, which was released on May 10 via Pure Noise Records, alongside its lead single "Blinding Faith". The second single, "Don't Reach for Me", was released on April 3, 2024. The third single, "Suffocate" featuring Poppy, was released on April 23, 2024. In November 2024, the song was nominated at the 67th annual Grammy Awards in the category of Best Metal Performance. On November 27, 2024, the band performed "Suffocate" with Poppy on Jimmy Kimmel Live.

The band performed with Slayer at Hersheypark Stadium in Hershey, Pennsylvania in 2025. The event was hosted by WWE wrestler Damian Priest.

On February 10, 2026, the band released the single "Hive Mind", featuring rapper Denzel Curry. They supported the Metallica M72 World Tour in Europe in the spring of 2026. They embarked on the Hive Mind Tour with Denzel Curry in North America in the autumn of 2026.

== Musical style and influences ==
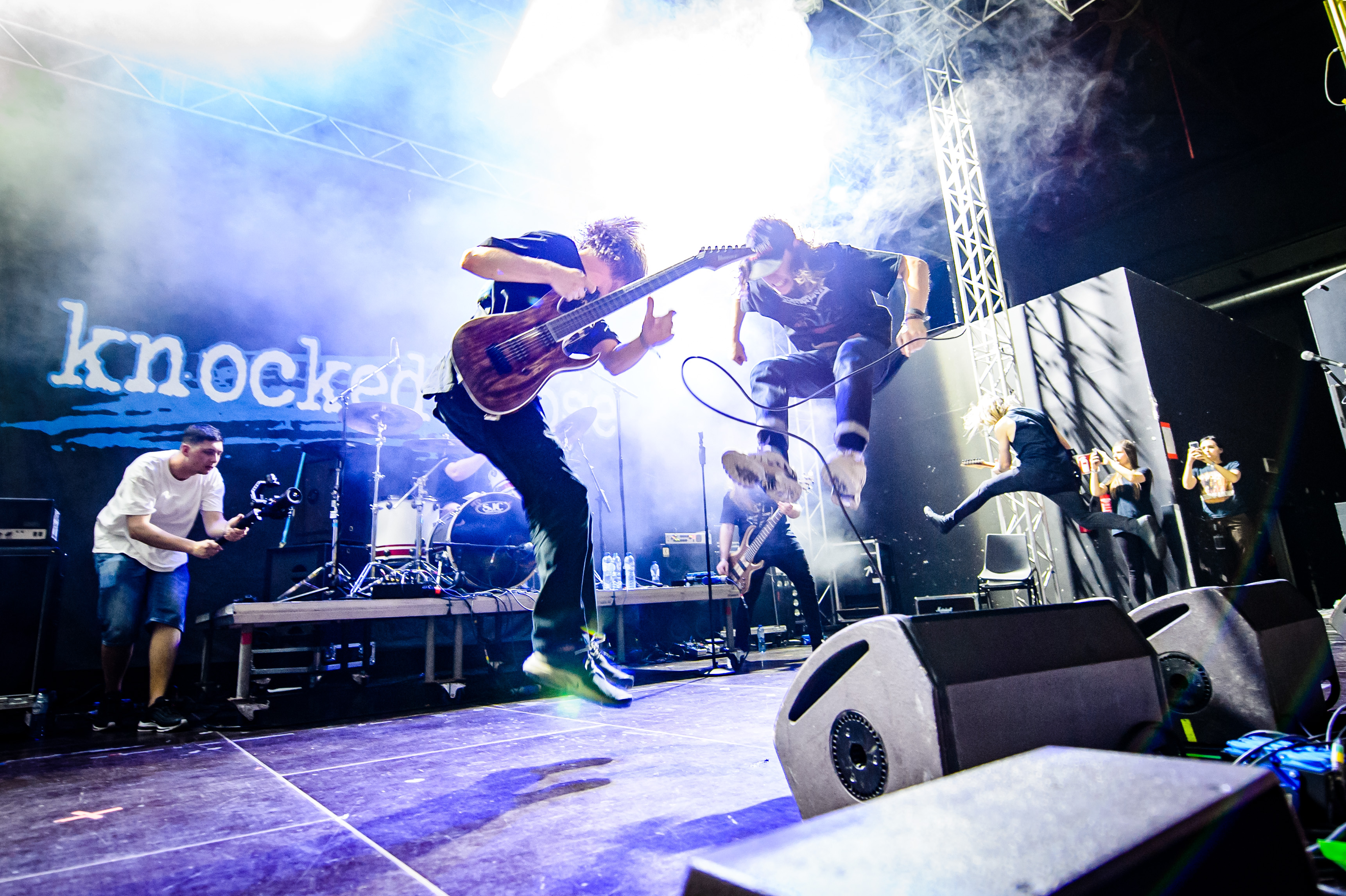
Knocked Loose performing live in 2018

Knocked Loose has been described as metalcore, hardcore punk, and beatdown hardcore. New Noise, when reviewing their debut album Laugh Tracks, described the band's sound as being akin to "Comeback Kid at their heaviest with some added doses of Slayer riffs and Code Orange-style malice". Bryan Garris, the band's lead vocalist, has described their sound as being "sandwiched between hardcore and metalcore", although he has stated that the band's intention was to produce a diverse sound that was difficult to categorize.

The band has cited Meshuggah, Gojira, Harm's Way, Xibalba, Vildhjarta, Crowbar, Martyr A.D., Disembodied, Korn, Omen, Lizzy Borden, Slayer, Judge, Hatebreed, Slipknot, Every Time I Die, Suicide Silence and Job for a Cowboy as influences. For A Tear in the Fabric of Life, they cited death metal and Phil Spector as influences.

== Band members ==
Current

- Bryan Garris – lead vocals (2013–present)
- Isaac Hale – lead guitar, harsh vocals, backing vocals (2013–present), rhythm guitar (2013–2015)
- Kevin Otten – bass (2013–present)
- Kevin "Pacsun" Kaine – drums (2015–present)
- Nicko Calderon – rhythm guitar, backing vocals (2020–present)

Former

- Dylan Isaacs – drums (2013–2014)
- Nate Woods – drums (2014)
- Cole Crutchfield – rhythm guitar, backing vocals (2015–2020)

== Discography ==
=== Studio albums ===
- Laugh Tracks (2016, Pure Noise)
- A Different Shade of Blue (2019, Pure Noise)
- You Won't Go Before You're Supposed To (2024, Pure Noise)

=== Demos, EPs and splits ===
- Pop Culture (2014, Little Heart)
- 2013 Demo's (2014)
- Knocked Loose/Damaged Goods (2015, No Luck/Little Heart)
- Mistakes Like Fractures (2019, Pure Noise)
- A Tear in the Fabric of Life (2021, Pure Noise)

=== Singles ===
Title	Year	Peak chart positions	Album
Title	Year	US Hard Rock	Album
"Deadringer"	2016	—	Laugh Tracks
"Mistakes Like Fractures"	2019	—	A Different Shade of Blue
"Deep in the Willow"	2023	—	Upon Loss Singles
"Everything Is Quiet Now"	2023	—	Upon Loss Singles
"Blinding Faith"	2024	11	You Won't Go Before You're Supposed To
"Don't Reach for Me"	2024	12	You Won't Go Before You're Supposed To
"Suffocate" (featuring Poppy)	2024	5	You Won't Go Before You're Supposed To
"Hive Mind" (featuring Denzel Curry)	2026	14	Non-album single

=== Other charted songs ===
Title	Year	Peak chart positions	Album
Title	Year	US Hard Rock	Album
"Thirst"	2024	10	You Won't Go Before You're Supposed To
"Piece by Piece"	2024	14	You Won't Go Before You're Supposed To
"Moss Covers All"	2024	19	You Won't Go Before You're Supposed To
"Take Me Home"	2024	20	You Won't Go Before You're Supposed To
"Slaughterhouse 2" (featuring Chris Motionless)	2024	6	You Won't Go Before You're Supposed To
"The Calm That Keeps You Awake"	2024	24	You Won't Go Before You're Supposed To

=== Compilation appearances ===
- "SS" (2014, on I Would Have Waited an Eternity for This)

== Awards and nominations ==
Grammy Awards

Year	Nominated work	Category	Result	Notes
2025	"Suffocate"	Best Metal Performance	Nominated	
2027	"Hive Mind"	Best Metal Performance	Pending	
