= The Process of Human Extermination =

Studio album by Fit for an Autopsy
- Released: June 21, 2011
- Studio: Nuthouse Studios, Hoboken, New Jersey; The Machine Shop, Weehawken, New Jersey
- Genre: Deathcore
- Length: 32:38
- Label: BMA
- Producer: Will Putney

Fit for an Autopsy chronology
Hell on Earth (2009)	The Process of Human Extermination (2011)	Hellbound (2013)

Singles from The Process of Human Extermination
- 1. "The Conquerer" Released: May 19, 2011; 2. "The Consumer" Released: June 7, 2011

The Process of Human Extermination is the debut studio album by American deathcore band Fit for an Autopsy. The album was released on June 21, 2011 through BMA and was produced by the band's guitarist Will Putney.

Professional ratings
Review scores
Source	Rating
AllMusic	4/5 stars

== Track listing ==
All tracks are written by Fit for an Autopsy.

No.	Title	Length
1.	"The Conquerer"	4:14
2.	"The Colonist (feat. Ray Mazzola of Full Blown Chaos)"	2:59
3.	"The Desecrator (feat. Tim Williams of Vision Of Disorder)"	2:50
4.	"The Juggernaut"	2:53
5.	"The Wolf (feat. Guy Kozowyk of The Red Chord)"	2:29
6.	"The Consumer (feat. Travis Richter of The Human Abstract)"	2:42
7.	"The Locust (feat. Marc Lambert of Painted In Exile)"	3:09
8.	"The False Prophet"	3:18
9.	"The Jackal"	3:22
10.	"The Executioner"	4:38
Total length:		32:38

== Personnel ==
Credits adapted from album's liner notes.

Fit for an Autopsy

- Nate Johnson – lead vocals
- Will Putney – guitars, bass
- Pat Sheridan – guitars, backing vocals
- Brian Mathis – drums

Additional personnel

- Will Putney – production, engineering, mixing, mastering
- Aaron Marsh – layout
