= Only Slime =

Experimental music duo

ONLY SLIME
- Origin: Oslo, Norway
- Genres: Performance art; Theatre; Musicals; Electronica; Computer game culture
- Works: AFTERLIFE (2024); Dragonblood (2025)
- Years active: 2022–present
- Award: Work of the Year Award Norwegian Society of Composers (2024)
- Members: Claudia Cox; Tobi Pfeil
- Website: onlyslime.net

Only Slime (stylised as ONLY SLIME) is an experimental artist duo based in Oslo consisting of Claudia Cox and Tobi Pfeil. The duo is known for theatrical performances drawing upon internet culture, video games and digital technologies. They characterise their own work as having a "bold, signature aesthetic that blends live motion capture, autotuned opera, electronica, black metal, and game engine worlds." In 2025 they worked with Tani Dibasey.

== Biographies ==
Claudia Cox is originally Australian, and is also a Norwegian citizen, having lived in Norway since 2012. Tobi Pfeil is from Germany. They live together in Oslo, Norway. Both are trained composers, and Cox has studied violin and Pfeil studied as a band musician. They met online in 2021 when Cox was bedbound after a serious fall and Pfeil was lonely in Hamburg.

Pfeil's website states they have a BA in Music Performance from RMC Copenhagen, and then studied composition with Simon Steen-Andersen and Cathy Van Eck in Bern, and Alexander Schubert in Hamburg. Pfeil is non-binary.

Cox is originally from the small town Singleton, New South Wales in Australia. Her mother was a violinist, and Cox began violin lessons at the age of two, with Suzuki technique teacher Haruo Goto. She moved to Newcastle, New South Wales as a teenager. After completing a Bachelor of Music at the University of Newcastle, she moved to Bergen, Norway, where she completed an MA in music from the University of Bergen. Her musical style began to change at this time, and she joined the band Major Parkinson in 2016, saying that while she had intended to work as an orchestra musician she found more experimental music much more liberating. Her debut album was Ouroboros, released under the name Peri Winkle in 2025.

== Works ==
AFTERLIFE is a computer game opera, lasting for 104 minutes, that follows two 3D avatars questing for meaning in a game universe. Cox and Pfeil stand on stage as they control the avatars, a salamander and Godzilla, as they move through game environments programmed in Unreal Engine. They use the old Xbox motion sensor controller Kinect so the avatars copy their body language live on stage. The electronic music is inspired by hyperpop and vaporwave, Vocals are heavily autotuned, not just for song but speech and other sounds - "even their yawns are melodic", one reviewer wrote. AFTERLIFE was developed during a residency at Det Norske Teatret in Oslo, and has also been performed at Black Box in Oslo, Trondheim at the Meta.Morf festival in 2026, and in Liverpool. It was inspired by a serious fall Claudia Cox experienced during acrobatics, where she fell three metres and landed headfirst on the floor of the stage. She says it felt as though time stopped during the fall. The lengthy recovery gave her a lot of time to consider life, death and what might come afterwards. AFTERLIFE is not a direct retelling of this experience, but instead explores the themes through the abstracted world of video games, playing not only with game culture references but also with gameplay glitches like noclipping, where a player avatar passes through walls or floors like a ghost, either using cheat codes or due to a bug in the game.

Dragonblood is another computer game musical developed in 2025 during a residency at Det Norske Teatret in Oslo, in collaboration with Tani Dibasey. It was described as "stage art for a new generation" by Dagsavisen, The music is inspired by technopop, Rammstein and the medieval music of fantasy video games. The characters speak as though they are in a live action role-playing game (larp) or typing in the text chats of online games. The visuals have been described as a mix of video game imagery, the spectacle of Eurovision Song Contest and a high school review. The storyline is about Julie the Dragonslayer who heads off to kill the dragon that killed her mother, along with two Vikings, a dragon child and a fool. Aftenposten's reviewer wrote that despite it being a lot of fun, and very professionally executed, it might not have had a deeper meaning beyond the feast of game references.

Unlimited Void was also created in collaboration with Tani Dibasey, and performed at Det Norske Teatret in 2025. The theatre's Scene 3 (stage 3) was converted to a resort with a bar and DJ, and the audience is framed as guests at the wedding of Tobi, who is acted by Tobi Pfeil, and a virtual avatar named OmaruChan.

== Awards ==
In 2024, Only Slime's "computer game opera" AFTERLIFE was one of three winners of the Norwegian Society of Composers "Work of the year" award. The jury described the work as "uncompromising" and "technologically original", writing that Only Slime had "created an experience that is both personal and universal, and a daring reflection over life, death and what perhaps lies between."
