= Hellbound (Fit for an Autopsy album) =

Studio album by Fit for an Autopsy
- Released: September 10, 2013
- Studio: The Machine Shop, Belleville, New Jersey
- Genre: Deathcore
- Length: 37:07
- Label: eOne; Good Fight
- Producer: Will Putney

Fit for an Autopsy chronology
The Process of Human Extermination (2011)	Hellbound (2013)	Absolute Hope Absolute Hell (2015)

Singles from Hellbound
- 1. "Still We Destroy" Released: August 13, 2013; 2. "Do You See Him" Released: August 28, 2013; 3. "Thank You Budd Dwyer" Released: September 3, 2013; 4. "Tremors" Released: September 5, 2013

Hellbound is the second studio album by American deathcore band Fit for an Autopsy. The album was released on September 10, 2013 through eOne Music and Good Fight Music, and was produced by the band's guitarist Will Putney.

Professional ratings
Review scores
Source	Rating
Louder Sound	3.5/5 stars
New Transcendence	10/10

== Track listing ==
All tracks are written by Fit for an Autopsy.

No.	Title	Length
1.	"The Great Gift of the World"	5:10
2.	"Still We Destroy" (featuring CJ McMahon of Thy Art Is Murder)	3:25
3.	"Thank You Budd Dwyer" (featuring Nate Rebolledo of Xibalba)	2:51
4.	"Do You See Him"	3:24
5.	"Tremors"	3:59
6.	"Dead in the Dirt"	3:27
7.	"There Is Nothing Here Worth Keeping" (featuring Brook Reeves of Impending Doom)	3:52
8.	"Mother of the Year"	2:58
9.	"Children of the Corn Syrup" (featuring Vincent Bennett of The Acacia Strain)	3:16
10.	"The Travelers"	4:40
Total length:		37:07

== Personnel ==
Credits adapted from album's liner notes.

Fit for an Autopsy

- Nate Johnson – lead vocals
- Will Putney – guitars, bass
- Pat Sheridan – guitars, backing vocals
- Tim Howley – guitars
- Josean Orta – drums

Additional musicians

- CJ McMahon of Thy Art Is Murder – guest vocals on "Still We Destroy"
- Nate Rebolledo of Xibalba – guest vocals on "Thank You Budd Dwyer"
- Brook Reeves of Impending Doom – guest vocals on "There Is Nothing Here Worth Keeping"
- Vincent Bennett of The Acacia Strain – guest vocals on "Children of the Corn Syrup"

Additional personnel

- Will Putney – production, engineering, mixing, mastering
- Randy Leboeuf – editing
- Brian Mercer – artwork, layout
- Kevin Mercer – layout

== Charts ==
Chart (2013)	Peak position
US Top Hard Rock Albums (Billboard)	23
US Heatseekers Albums (Billboard)	18
