= The Sea of Tragic Beasts =

Studio album by Fit for an Autopsy
- Released: October 25, 2019
- Studio: Graphic Nature Audio, Belleville, New Jersey
- Genre: Deathcore
- Length: 43:51
- Label: Nuclear Blast
- Producer: Will Putney

Fit for an Autopsy chronology
The Great Collapse (2017)	The Sea of Tragic Beasts (2019)	Oh What the Future Holds (2022)

Singles from The Sea of Tragic Beasts
- 1. "Mirrors" Released: July 19, 2019; 2. "The Sea of Tragic Beasts" Released: August 29, 2019; 3. "Shepherd" Released: October 17, 2019

The Sea of Tragic Beasts is the fifth studio album by American deathcore band Fit for an Autopsy. The album was released on October 25, 2019 through Nuclear Blast and was produced by the band's guitarist Will Putney. It is the first album to feature bassist Peter Spinazola after his addition to the band earlier in the year, and the first album where Putney didn't perform bass himself.

Professional ratings
Review scores
Source	Rating
Distorted Sound	9/10
Exclaim!	8/10
KillYourStereo	Positive
Rock Sins	8/10

== Track listing ==
All tracks are written by Fit for an Autopsy.

No.	Title	Length
1.	"The Sea of Tragic Beasts"	4:24
2.	"No Man Is Without Fear"	4:39
3.	"Shepherd"	4:11
4.	"Your Pain Is Mine"	5:12
5.	"Mirrors"	4:22
6.	"Unloved"	2:45
7.	"Mourn"	4:31
8.	"Warfare"	3:20
9.	"Birds of Prey"	5:28
10.	"Napalm Dreams"	4:56
Total length:		43:51

== Personnel ==
Credits adapted from album's liner notes.

Fit for an Autopsy

- Joe Badolato – lead vocals
- Will Putney – guitars
- Pat Sheridan – guitars, backing vocals
- Tim Howley – guitars
- Peter "Blue" Spinazola – bass
- Josean Orta – drums

Additional personnel

- Will Putney – engineering, mixing, mastering
- Steve Seid – engineering
- Matt Guglielmo – editing
- Geo Hewitt – assistant
- Adam Burke – artwork
