= End (band) =

American metalcore band

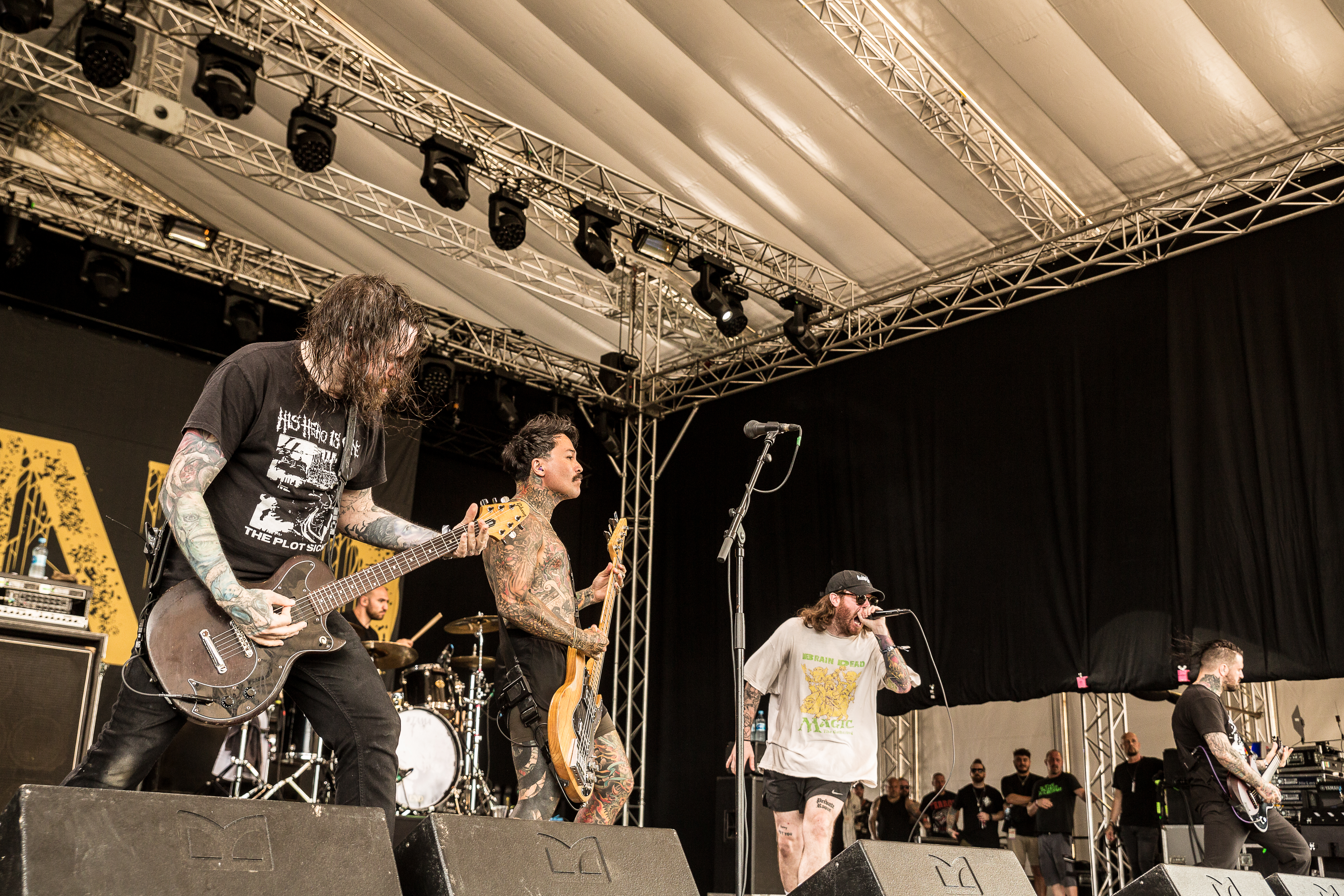
- End at the Full Force 2023

Background information
- Origin: New Jersey, U.S.
- Genres: Metalcore; blackened hardcore; grindcore
- Years active: 2017–present
- Labels: Closed Casket Activities; Good Fight Music
- Spinoff of: Counterparts; Fit for an Autopsy; Shai Hulud; The Acacia Strain; Structures; Reign Supreme
- Members: Brendan Murphy; Will Putney; Gregory Thomas; Jay Pepito; Matt Guglielmo
- Past members: Andrew McEnaney; Billy Rymer
- Website: https://www.yourfuckingend.com

End is an American metalcore supergroup composed of singer Brendan Murphy (Counterparts), guitarists Will Putney (Fit For An Autopsy) and Gregory Thomas (Shai Hulud), bassist Jay Pepito (Reign Supreme), and drummer Matt Guglielmo (the Acacia Strain).

== History ==
The band was formed in 2017 and in August of that year released the song "Usurper", as a single from their debut EP, "From the Unforgiving Arms of God", which was released on September 8, 2017. In early 2020, drummer Andrew McEnaney left and was replaced by Billy Rymer

On March 26, 2020, the band released the single "Pariah", and announced their debut album "Splinters from an Ever-Changing Face" would be released through Closed Casket Activities. They released 3 more singles from the album, and on June 5, 2020, released their debut album, "Splinters from an Ever-Changing Face". Forbes noted that the band seemed like the next powerhouse within hardcore music.

On October 27, 2023, the band released their sophomore LP "The Sin of Human Frailty" through Closed Casket Activities, produced by guitarist Will Putney.

== Members ==
Current

- Brendan Murphy – lead vocals (2017–present)
- Will Putney – guitar (2017–present)
- Gregory Thomas – guitar (2017–present)
- Jay Pepito – bass guitar, vocals (2017–present)
- Matt Guglielmo – drums (2022–present)

Past

- Andrew McEnaney – drums (2017-2020)
- Billy Rymer – drums (2020–2022)

Touring

- Chris Teti – bass (2023-2024)

== Discography ==
Albums

- Splinters from an Ever-Changing Face (2020)
- The Sin of Human Frailty (2023)

EPs

- From the Unforgiving Arms of God (2017)
- Gather & Mourn (split with Cult Leader) (2022)

Live Albums

- Bastard Reflection (2023)
