= Major Parkinson (album) =

Studio album by Major Parkinson
- Released: 2008
- Recorded: Weed, California, United States, 2006
- Genre: Rock
- Length: 47:03
- Label: Degaton Records
- Producer: Sylvia Massy

Major Parkinson chronology
Major Parkinson (2008)	Songs from a Solitary Home (2010)

Professional ratings
Review scores
Source	Rating
Dagbladet	lenke
BT	lenke
FB	lenke
Bergensavisen	lenke

Major Parkinson is the debut album of the Norwegian rock band Major Parkinson.

It was released in Norway on 25 August 2008. The album was well received by the press, and, among other things, was voted the year's 11th best Norwegian record in 2008. Recorded and mixed by producer Sylvia Massy in her RadioStar Studios in Weed, California.

== Track listing ==
1. "Intro"
2. "Bicycle!"
3. "Bazooka Mirror"
4. "Meat Me in the Disco"
5. "Silicon Hips"
6. "Casanova"
7. "It's a Job"
8. "Sanity Fair"
9. "Death in the Candystore"
10. "197"
11. "I Am Erica"
12. "Awkward as a Drunk"
13. "Greatest Love"
