= Billy Rymer =

American drummer

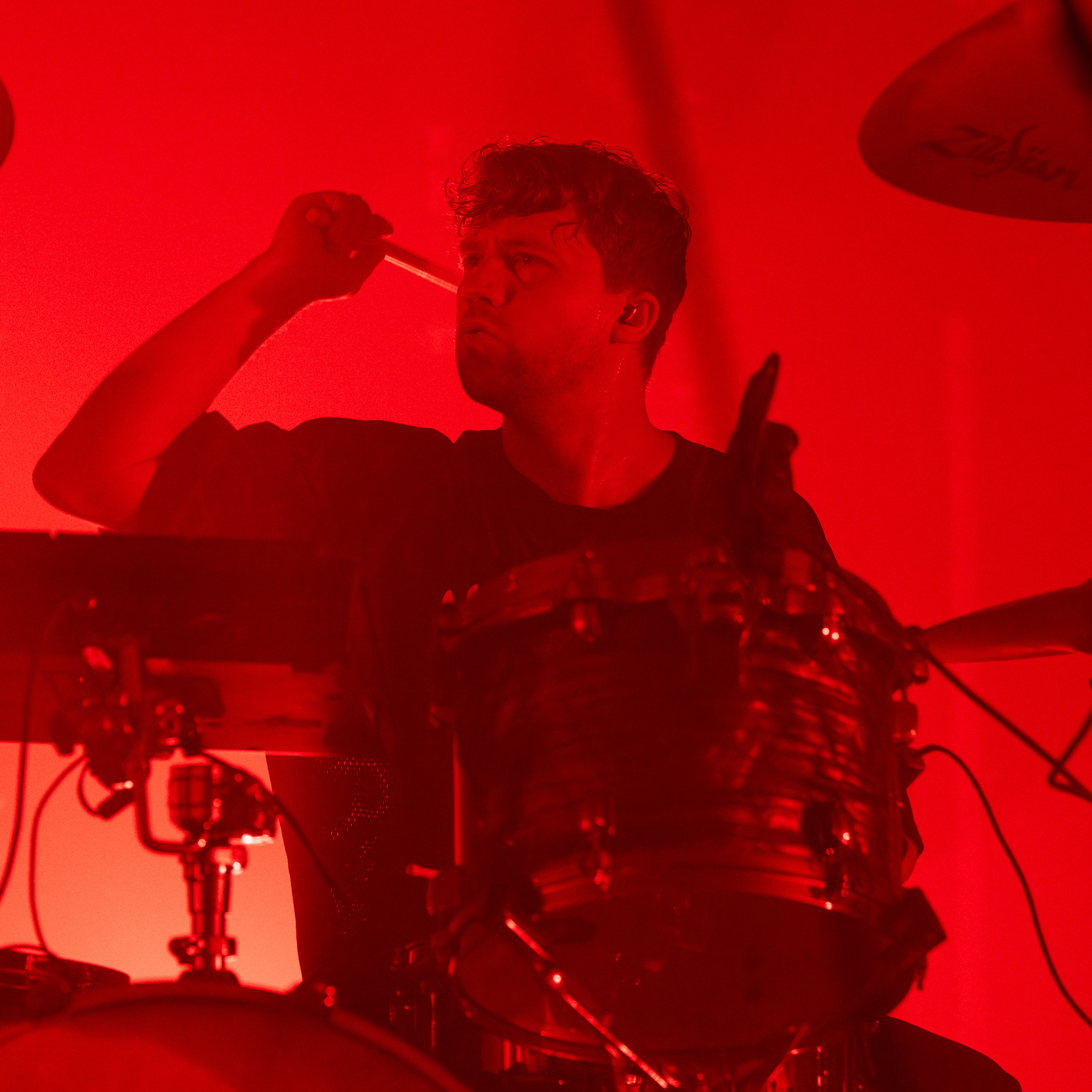
- Rymer performing with Ho99o9 in 2023

Background information
- Born: December 10, 1984 (age 41); Long Island, New York, U.S.
- Genres: Mathcore; progressive metal; alternative metal; experimental metal; jazz fusion
- Occupation: Musician
- Instrument: Drums
- Years active: 2009–present
- Member of: The Dillinger Escape Plan; NK; No Machine; thoughtcrimes; END; Suicidal Tendencies; Ho99o9
- Formerly of: The Rivalry

Billy Rymer (born December 10, 1984) is an American musician, most notable for being the drummer for the mathcore band The Dillinger Escape Plan from 2009 until the band played its final shows in December 2017, and again since December 2023.

== Career ==
=== The Dillinger Escape Plan (2009–2017) ===
Prior to joining The Dillinger Escape Plan, Rymer was the drummer for Long Island-based rock band The Rivalry. After a trial of auditions, guitarist Ben Weinman invited him to Australia to play Soundwave Music Festival, and in early 2009 it was revealed that Rymer would officially replace Gil Sharone as the new drummer.

In an interview with Noisey, Weinman said the Dillinger Escape Plan would stop performing, with Greg Puciato later saying "we're breaking up." Puciato was quoted saying that the band still enjoyed writing, recording and performing together but "we started to reach what felt like a thematic conclusion to our band", comparing the decision to a filmmaker who enjoys the current film he is creating but cannot continue the process indefinitely. Weinman said, "we are going to do the cycle for this album and that's it."

Rymer reunited with The Dillinger Escape Plan in 2023, alongside Weinman, original singer Dimitri Minakakis and bassist Liam Wilson. The reunited band played their first shows in June 2024.

=== North Korea / NK (2010–present) ===
Rymer and bandmates Ryan Hunter, Brian Byrne (both ex-Envy On the Coast) and Michael Sadis (of The Rivalry) announced the band North Korea on November 15, 2010. On March 17, 2011, North Korea announced that they will release a free new EP by the name of Basement Tapes Vol. 1 on April 1, 2011. The band released Basement Tapes Vol. 1 on April 1, 2011, via Facebook. The band released their second EP Basement Tapes Vol. 2 on February 21, 2012, via Facebook. On April 4, 2013, North Korea announced through Facebook that they would be changing their band name from North Korea to NK. The band was said to be working with Mike Sapone on a full-length release by their label Triple Crown Records. The band's debut album, Nothing to Be Gained Here was officially released on May 21, 2013, through Triple Crown Records. On the January 14, 2016, it was brought to the band's attention that Basement Tapes Vol.1 and 2 were unavailable for digital download, so they offered a free download link via Facebook.

=== No Machine (2014–present) ===
In April 2014, Rymer was announced to be part of a new project named No Machine. Joining him was fellow NK bandmate Michael Sadis and Isaac Bolivar (of Happy Body Slow Brain). Alongside the announcement, a live video for the song “Nobody” was released. On October 7, 2014, No Machine released their debut EP Volume One through intheclouds Records.

=== thoughtcrimes (2019–present) ===
Rymer formed the metal/hardcore band thoughtcrimes. The band plans to release an EP with only one week to write this material, Rymer stated "I've found we work best under pressure." The EP Tap Night was released on March 22, 2019.

=== Other musical contributions ===
In 2005 Rymer returned to his high school for a one time performance with the group "The Manhattan Project" which included lead guitarist Dave "The Ravishing One" Morofsky, bassist Logan Harris and vocalist Tom Ragazinno

Rymer played a short stint of shows with Psychostick in September 2010.

In December 2016, Rymer confirmed that he'd tracked drums for "a whole album's worth of material" towards Glassjaw's third album.

In September 2019, Rymer reunited with Dillinger Escape Plan guitarist Ben Weinman while playing a span of shows behind the kit for Suicidal Tendencies as a fill-in for Dave Lombardo.

As of February 2020, Rymer has been performing as the touring drummer for Ho99o9.

In November 2025, Rymer contributed drums to the Moron Police album "Pachinko" to fill in for their former drummer, Thore Omland Pettersen, who died in a car accident in 2022.

== Equipment ==
Tama Silverstar (Indigo Sparkle):

22" x 18" Bass Drum
14" x 6.5" Snare Drum
12" x 9" Tom
16" x 14" Floor Tom

Zildjian Cymbals:,
14" A New Beat Hi-Hats
20" A Custom Crash
21" K Crash/Ride
19" Z3 Ultra Hammered China

== Discography ==
=== With The Dillinger Escape Plan ===
- Option Paralysis (2010)
- One of Us Is the Killer (2013)
- Dissociation (2016)

=== With END ===
- Splinters From An Ever-Changing Face (2020)

=== With NK ===
- Basement Tapes Vol. 1 (2011) (released under the name North Korea)
- Basement Tapes Vol. 2 (2012) (released under the name North Korea)
- Nothing To Be Gained Here (2013)

=== With No Machine ===
- Volume One (2014)
- Good News (2015)

=== With Glassjaw ===
- Material Control (2017)

=== With thoughtcrimes ===
- Tap Night (2019)
- Altered Pasts (2022)

=== With Moron Police ===
- Pachinko (2025)
