= Songs from a Solitary Home =

Studio album by Major Parkinson
- Released: 13 September 2010
- Recorded: 2010
- Genre: Rock
- Label: Degaton

Major Parkinson chronology
| Major Parkinson (2008) | Songs from a Solitary Home (2010) | Twilight Cinema (2014) |

Songs from a Solitary Home is the second studio album by Norwegian band Major Parkinson. It was released on 13 September 2010.

== Track listing ==
1. "Ecophobia"
2. "Solitary Home"
3. "Teenage Mannequins"
4. "Simone!"
5. "Card Boxes"
6. "The Age of the Paranoia"
7. "Dance With the Cookieman"
8. "Trampoline Superstar"
9. "Downtown Boogie"
10. "Heart of Hickory"
11. "Domestic Violets"
12. "Adville"
13. "The Transient"
