= Valesa – Chapter 1: Velvet Prison =

Valesa – Chapter I: Velvet Prison
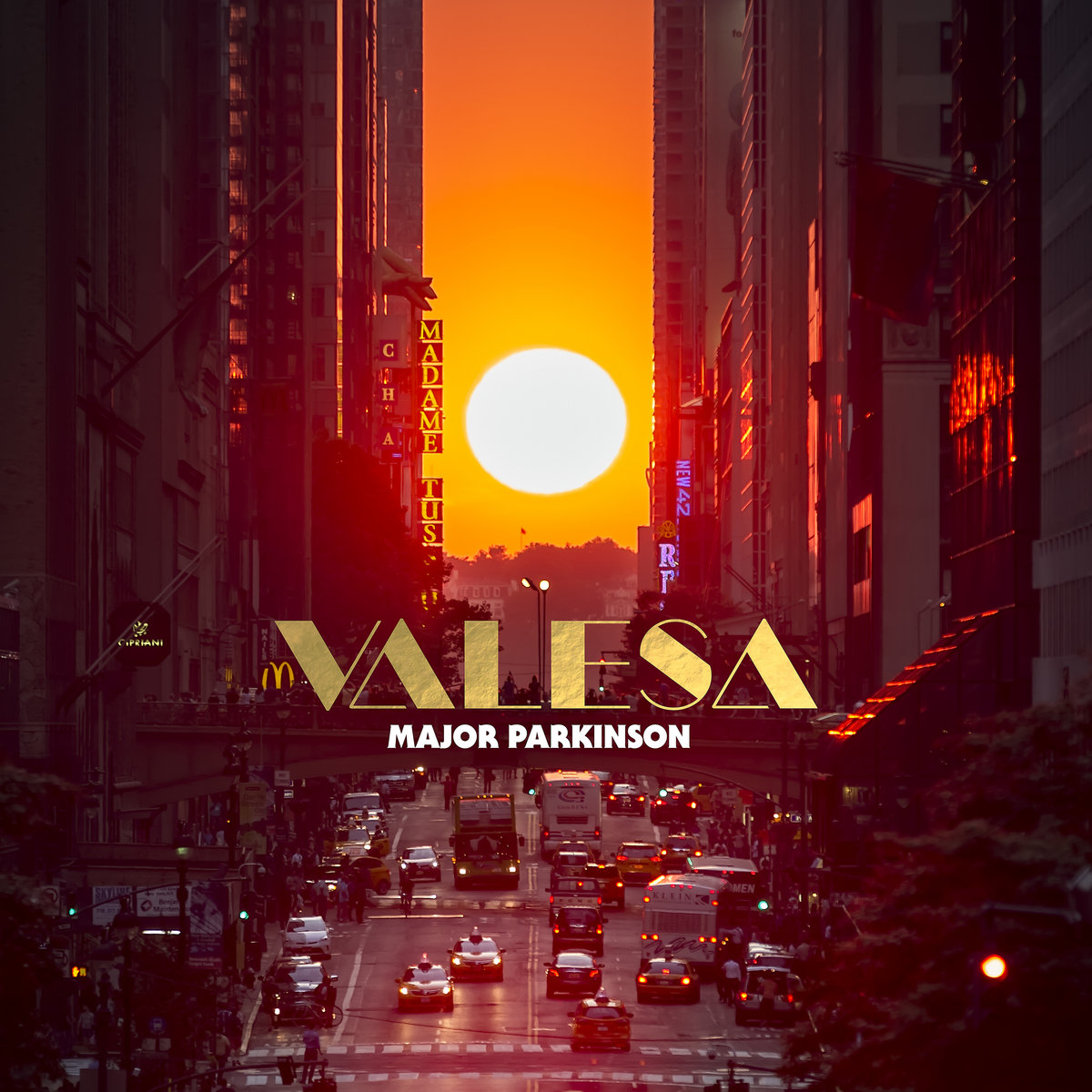

Studio album by Major Parkinson
- Released: 7 October 2022
- Studio: Degaton Studios & Room 114
- Genre: Rock
- Length: 60:00
- Label: Degaton

Major Parkinson chronology
Blackbox (2017)	Valesa – Chapter I: Velvet Prison (2022)

Valesa is the fifth studio album by Norwegian band Major Parkinson. The double album was released on 7 October 2022.

The critical reception to the album has been positive.

== Track listing ==
1. "Goodbye Blue Monday"
2. "Behind the Next Door"
3. "Saturday Night"
4. "Ride in the Whirlwind"
5. "Live Forever"
6. "Sadlands"
7. "Intermezzo"
8. "Jonah"
9. "Velvet Moon"
10. "Irina Margareta"
11. "The House"
12. "The Room"
13. "Posh-Apocalypse"
14. "Moma"
15. "Lemon Symphony"
16. "Fantasia Me Now!"
17. "Heroes"

== Personnel ==
Major Parkinson

- Jon Ivar Kolbotn – lead vocals, lyrics, songwriting, arrangement
- Eivind Gammersvik – bass, songwriting, production, arrangement, backing vocals
- Lars Christian Bjørknes – piano, synth, songwriting, organs, programming, notation, backing vocals
- Sondre Skollevoll – guitars, backing vocals, additional synths, arrangement,
- Sondre Sagstad Veland – drums, perc, arrangement, backing vocals
- Øystein Bech-Eriksen – guitars, arrangement
- Claudia Cox: – violin, backing vocals, arrangement

Additional personnel

- Linn Frøkedal – lead vocals
- Carmen Boveda – cello
- Peri Winkle – violins
- Jens Erik Aasmundseth – C64 keyboard percussion
- Anders Bjelland – Guitars, Downtown Meltdown
- Bjarne Tresnes Sørensen – harmonica
- Kadeem Nichols – tenor, vocal contractor & choir engineer
- Porcha Clay, Naarai Jacobs – sopranos
- Megan Parker, Ashly Williams – altos
- Eric Lynn, Erik Brooks – tenors
- Thea Meidell Sjule, Vilja Kjersheim, Anja Moe – choir
