= Twilight Cinema =

Studio album by Major Parkinson
- Released: 24 January 2014
- Recorded: 2013
- Genre: Rock
- Label: Degaton Records

Major Parkinson chronology
Songs from a Solitary Home (2010)	Twilight Cinema (2014)	Blackbox (2017)

Twilight Cinema is the third studio album of the Norwegian band Major Parkinson. It was released on January 24, 2014. Major Parkinson launched an Indiegogo campaign to fund this album.

In a positive review, Metal Storm said that "Twilight Cinema defies categorisation. You can call it progressive rock, you can call it avantgarde, or cabaret, a musical, or even a theatrical play.". In another positive review, Nordic Music Review called the album a combination of "dark rock" and a "seaside puppet show act".

== Track listing ==
1. "Skeleton Sangria"
2. "Impermanence"
3. "Black River"
4. "The Wheelbarrow"
5. "A Cabin in the Sky"
6. "Heart Machine"
7. "Beaks of Benelova"
8. "Twilight Cinema"

== Cultural references ==
The title song "Twilight Cinema" references 1916 silent film Poor Little Peppina and 1934 film The Barretts of Wimpole Street, and their respective lead actresses Mary Pickford and Norma Shearer.

In "The Wheelbarrow", the delirious co-protagonist named "Mr. Demille" believes he is Napoleon's troubadour at Borodino.

Several poets are named in "Impermanence": Keats, TS Eliot, Byron and Pope.
