= Blackbox (album) =

Studio album by Major Parkinson
- Released: 27 October 2017
- Recorded: 2016
- Studio: Duper Studio & Degaton Studios
- Genre: Rock
- Length: 47:45
- Label: Degaton Records

Major Parkinson chronology
Twilight Cinema (2014)	Blackbox (2017)	Valesa - Chapter 1: Velvet Prison (2022)

Blackbox is the fourth studio album of the Norwegian band Major Parkinson. It was released on 27 October 2017. The album features a new lineup and has an emphasis on dark, ambient electronica mixed with pop and prog rock.

The critical reception to the album has been positive. In 2023, Loudwire mentioned the album in their list of the best progressive rock & metal albums of each year since 1983.

== Track listing ==
1. "Lover, Lower Me Down!"
2. "Night Hitcher"
3. "Before the Helmets"
4. "Isabel: A Report to an Academy"
5. "Scenes from Edison's Black Maria"
6. "Madeleine Crumbles"
7. "Baseball"
8. "Strawberry Suicide"
9. "Blackbox"

== Cultural references ==
Just like Twilight Cinema, Blackbox features many cultural references, mostly from 19th and 20th century historical figures. The opening title "Lover, Lower Me Down!" includes a play on The Old Man and the Sea by Ernest Hemingway, while Hemingway himself is later mentioned in "Baseball". Several philosophers are named in "Isabel: A Report to an Academy" - Plato, Nietsche, Heidegger, Russell, while works by Salvador Dalí, René Magritte and Hieronymus Bosch are referenced.

== Personnel ==
Major Parkinson

- Jon Ivar Kolbotn – Lead vocals, lyrics, songwriting, arrangement
- Eivind Gammersvik – Bass, production, arrangement, backing vocals
- Lars Bjørknes – Piano, synth, organs, programming, notation, backing vocals
- Sondre Skollevoll – Guitars, backing vocals, additional synths, arrangement, microKORG (track 4)
- Sondre Sagstad Veland – Drums, perc, typewriter, arrangement, backing vocals
- Øystein Bech-Eriksen – Guitars, arrangement
- Claudia Cox: – Violin, backing vocals, arrangement

Additional personnel

- Linn Frøkedal – Lead vocals
- Carmen Boveda – Cello
- Jonas Flemsæter Hamre – Saxophone
- Joar Lemme – Trombone
- Gunleik Gisletveit – Tuba
- Logan Arndt – French horn
- Andreas Hesselberg Hatzikiriakidis – Trumpet
- Nataniel Hjønnevåg – Xylophone
- Thomas Rolland a.k.a. Lip Shaw – Whistling
- Megan Kovacs – Backing vocals
  Female choir by Volve Vokal:
- Thea Meidell Sjule
- Idunn Strøm Myklebust
- Frida Ekerhovd
- Kaja Linder Henriksen
- Ann Christin Jenssen
- Kristine Norebø
- Signe Wiger
- Kine Granum
- Malene Moen Sætre
- Solveig Foldnes Dybsland
