= Major Parkinson =

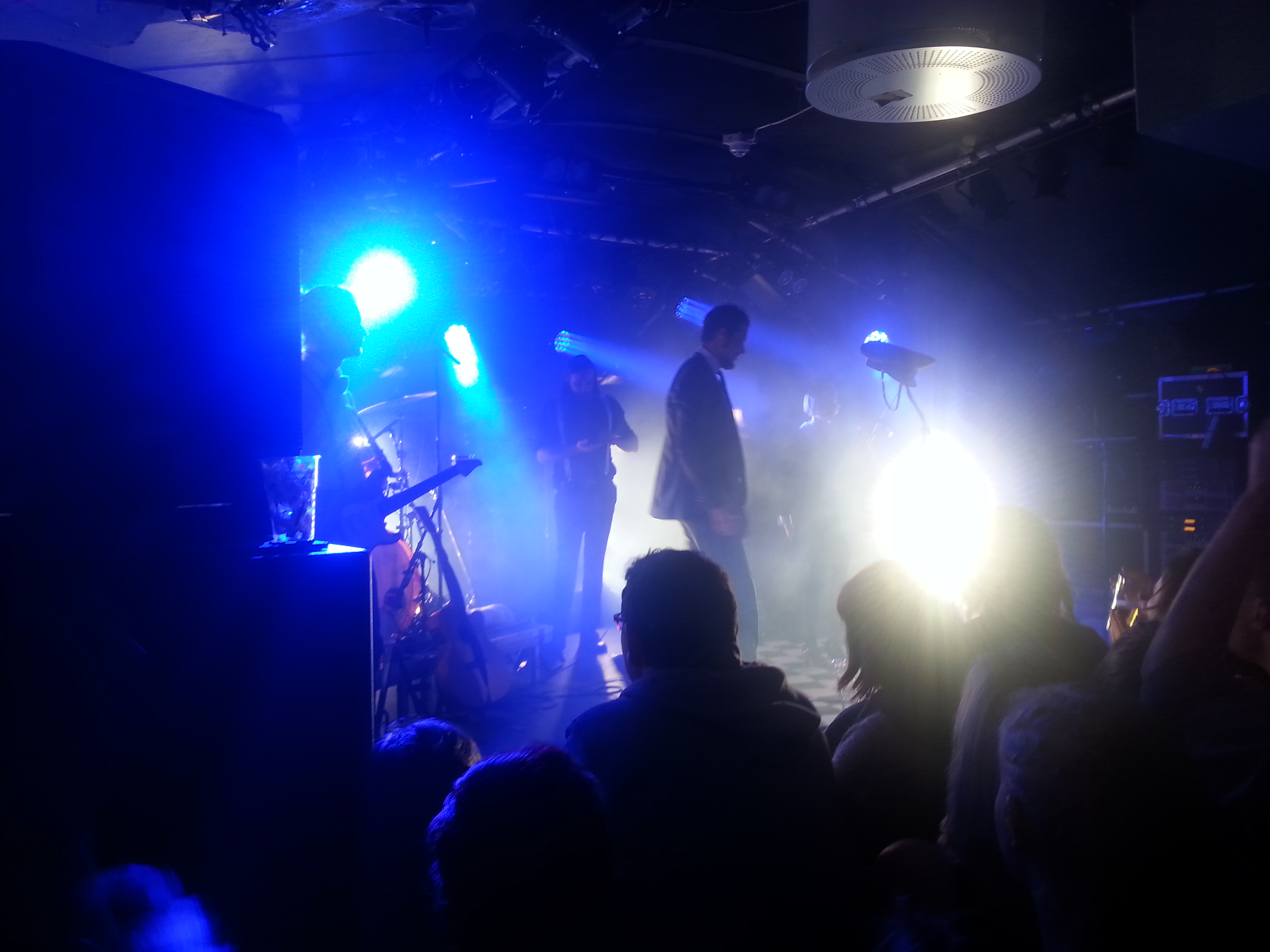
- Major Parkinson performing live at Hulen in 2016

Background information
- Origin: Bergen, Norway
- Genres: Experimental rock, progressive rock
- Years active: 2003–present
- Label: Degaton Records
- Website: majorparkinson.com

Major Parkinson is a Norwegian rock group currently based in Bergen.

== History ==
Major Parkinson was started in 2003 by Jon Ivar Kollbotn, Eivind Gammersvik, André Lund and Jan Are Rønhovde. In the same year, they won the Eggstock festival in Bergen, as well as the local band competition finals in Zoom.

In the summer of 2006, Major Parkinson was invited to record a debut album in the Radio Star Studios by producer Sylvia Massy, who also has worked with artists such as Red Hot Chili Peppers, Tool, Johnny Cash, System of a Down, Seigmen and Animal Alpha.

On August 25, 2008, Major Parkinson released the self-titled debut Major Parkinson, to good reviews in the Norwegian media.

They play energetic rock based on several genres – from classical melodious pop music to progressive and hardcore rock or cabaret rock.

In September 2010, Major Parkinson released their second album, named Songs from a Solitary Home. This release was followed by an extensive tour through continental Europe that ended in the famous "White Trash" in Berlin.

According to their website, guitarist and backing vocalist Alf Borge left the band in October 2011. He was replaced by Steinar Hjelmbrekke and the third album Twilight Cinema was released in early 2014 after the fans funded it.

In August 2014, half of the band members (Lund, Hjelmbrekke and Aasmundseth) announced that they would leave the band after a few more live performances in 2014. The remaining members stated they would go back to recording a new line up. This album, "Blackbox", was released in October, 2017.

In January 2019, in an interview with Proglodytes, Lars Christian Bjørknes revealed that their upcoming material would include a double album.

In July 2022, the band posted on their Facebook page that their next album, "Valesa: Chapter 1: Velvet Prison", would be released on October 7, 2022.

On October 7, 2022, Valesa – Chapter 1: Velvet Prison was released.

March 13, 2026, saw the release of the band's 6th studio album Valesa – Chapter II: Viva the Apocalypse!

== Members ==
=== Current members ===
- Jon Ivar Kollbotn – vocals (2003–present)
- Eivind Gammersvik – bass (2003–present)
- Lars Christian Bjørknes – synth (2008–present)
- Øystein Bech-Eriksen – guitar (2015–present)
- Sondre Veland – Drums (2015–present)
- Sondre Skollevoll – guitar/backing vocals/backing synth (2016–present)
- Claudia Cox (Peri Winkle) – Violin, live vocals (2016–present)

=== Former members ===
- Steinar Hjelmbrekke – guitar (2011–2014)

Twilight Cinema – Album – 2014

- Jens Erik Aasmundseth – drums (2009–2014)

Twilight Cinema – Album – 2014
Songs from a Solitary Home – Album – 2010

- André Lund – guitar ( 2003–2014)

Twilight Cinema – Album – 2014
Songs from a Solitary Home – Album – 2010
Major Parkinson – Album – 2008
Major Parkinson – EP – 2004

- Alf Borge – guitar/backing vocals (2003–2011)

Songs from a Solitary Home – Album – 2010
Major Parkinson – Album – 2008
Major Parkinson – EP – 2004

- Cato Olaisen – Drums (2004–2009)

Major Parkinson – Album – 2008

- Rasmus Hungnes – Drums (2004–2004)

Major Parkinson – EP – 2004

- Jan Are Rønhovde – Drums (2003–2004)

== Discography ==
Albums

- Major Parkinson – 2008
- Songs from a Solitary Home – 2010
- Twilight Cinema – 2014
- Blackbox – 2017
- Valesa - Chapter 1: Velvet Prison – 2022
- Valesa – Chapter 2: Viva the Apocalypse! – 2026

Live albums

- Live at Ricks – 2015
- A Night at the Library – 2022

Singles and EPs

- Major Parkinson (EP) – 2004
- "Euthanasia Roller Coaster" – 2013
- "Pretty Eyes, Pretty Eyes" – 2016
- "Madeleine Crumbles" – 2016
- "Blackbox" – 2017
- "Munchausen by Proxy" – 2018
- "Jonah" – 2020
- "Solitary Home – The Hollywood Tapes" – 2020
