= Fit for an Autopsy =

American deathcore band

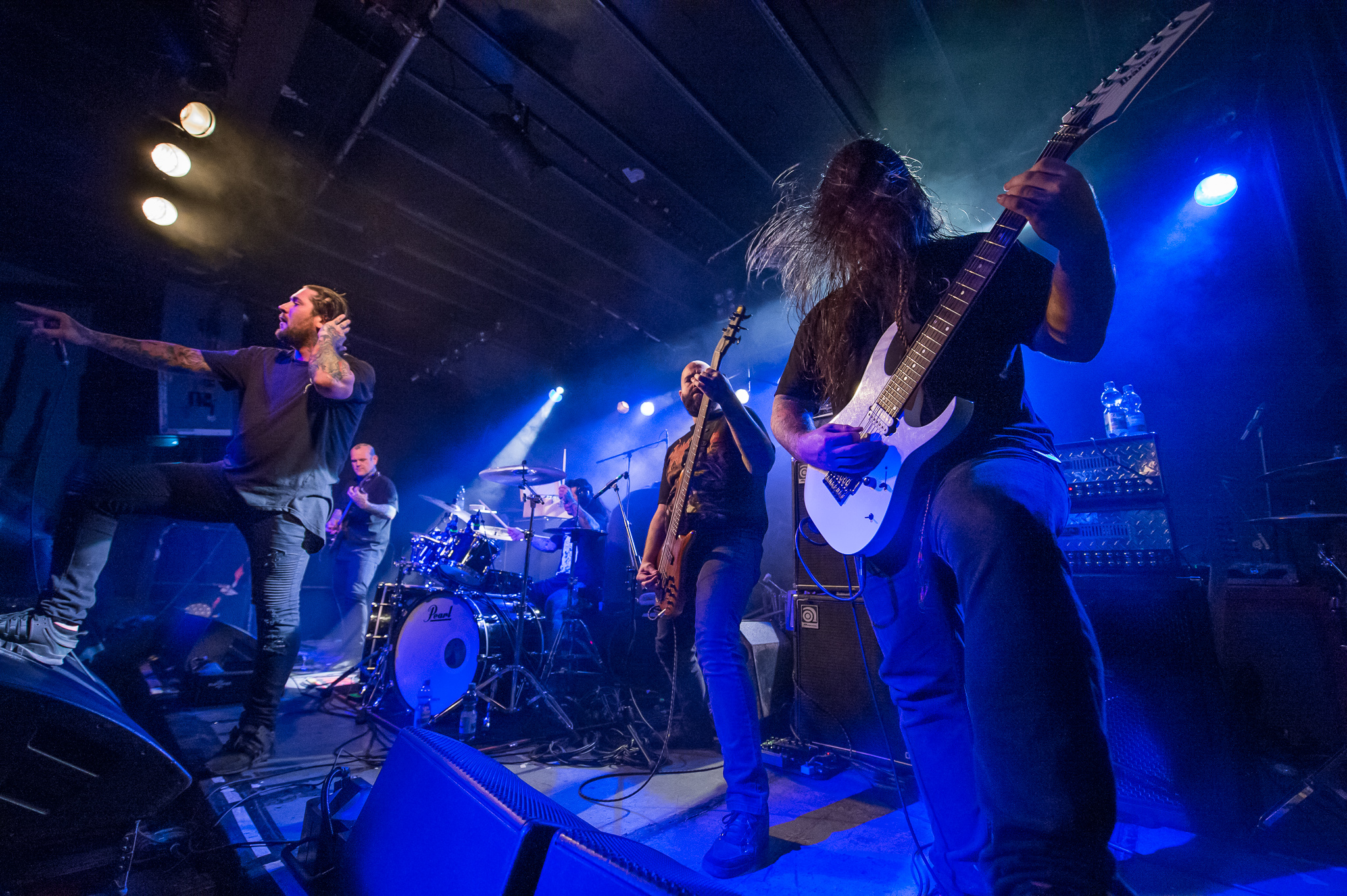
- Fit for an Autopsy in 2018

Background information
- Origin: Jersey City, New Jersey, U.S.
- Genres: Deathcore, progressive death metal
- Years active: 2008–present
- Labels: BMA; eOne Music; Nuclear Blast
- Members: Will Putney; Pat Sheridan; Josean Orta; Tim Howley; Joe Badolato; Peter Spinazola
- Past members: Brian Mathis; Nate Johnson; Greg Wilburn
- Website: fitforanautopsy.co

Fit for an Autopsy is an American deathcore band from Jersey City, New Jersey, formed in 2008. The band consists of guitarists Will Putney, Pat Sheridan and Tim Howley, drummer Josean Orta, lead vocalist Joe Badolato, and bassist Peter "Blue" Spinazola. They are currently signed to Nuclear Blast and have released seven studio albums since formation.

== History ==
The band released their first demo in 2008, followed a year later by the group's first EP, Hell on Earth. In 2011, Fit for an Autopsy released their debut studio album, The Process of Human Extermination.

In September 2013, the band released their second studio album, Hellbound. Less than a year later, in April 2014, the band announced that vocalist Nate Johnson would be leaving the band. Greg Wilburn of the Devastated was immediately named as Johnson's temporary replacement.

In early 2015, the band announced the departure of Greg Wilburn and the addition of their new vocalist, Joe Badolato. Along with this, they announced that they were in the writing process for a new album. This third studio album, named Absolute Hope Absolute Hell, was released on October 2, 2015.

In July 2016, the band announced a split-EP, named The Depression Sessions, with fellow deathcore bands Thy Art Is Murder and The Acacia Strain. The EP was released on August 12, 2016.

The band released a new song, "Heads Will Hang", from their fourth studio album The Great Collapse on January 31, 2017. The album was released on March 17, 2017. On May 8, 2018, Fit For An Autopsy announced they signed with Nuclear Blast.

On October 25, 2019, the band released their fifth studio album The Sea of Tragic Beasts through Nuclear Blast.

On April 6, 2020, the band released a standalone single "Fear Tomorrow" through Nuclear Blast.

On September 22, 2021, the band announced their new sixth studio album Oh What the Future Holds. Two days later, they released the album's first single "Far from Heaven". The song was later elected by Loudwire as the 35th best metal song of 2021. The album was released on January 14, 2022. Loudwire later noted Oh What the Future Holds as one of the Best Rock + Metal Albums of 2022.

On June 6, 2022, the band announced their invitation to tour with Lamb of God and Killswitch Engage as part of the Omens Tour.

On April 7, 2023, the band released a second split-EP. A sequel of sorts to 2016's The Depression Sessions called The Aggression Sessions still featuring Thy Art Is Murder but with Malevolence replacing The Acacia Strain.

On July 26, 2024, the band announced that their seventh studio album titled The Nothing That Is will be released on October 25, 2024 and released a single off the album titled "Hostage". On August 27, 2024, the band released another new single off the album titled "Savior Of None / Ashes Of All", followed by "Lower Purpose" which came out on October 10, 2024. A music video for the track "Red Horizon" came out on October 25, 2024, coinciding with the album release.

== Band members ==
Current

- Will Putney – guitars (2008–present); bass (studio only, 2008–2019)
- Pat Sheridan – guitars, backing vocals (2008–present)
- Josean Orta – drums (2012–present)
- Tim Howley – guitars (2013–present)
- Joe Badolato – lead vocals (2015–present)
- Peter "Blue" Spinazola – bass (2019–present; touring musician 2016–2019)

Former

- Brian Mathis – drums (2008–2012)
- Nate Johnson – lead vocals (2008–2014)
- Greg Wilburn – lead vocals (2014)

Touring

- Seth Coleman – bass (2009)
- Charlie Busacca – bass (2009–2012)
- Shane Slade – bass (2013–2016)
- Davier Pérez – drums (2018)

== Discography ==
Studio albums

List of studio albums, with selected chart positions
Title	Album details	Peak chart positions		
Title	Album details	US	US Heat.	US Hard Rock
The Process of Human Extermination	Released: June 21, 2011; Label: BMA	—	—	—
Hellbound	Released: September 10, 2013; Label: eOne Music	—	18	23
Absolute Hope Absolute Hell	Released: October 2, 2015; Label: eOne Music	—	3	18
The Great Collapse	Released: March 17, 2017; Label: eOne Music	199	2	13
The Sea of Tragic Beasts	Released: October 25, 2019; Label: Nuclear Blast	—	—	—
Oh What the Future Holds	Released: January 14, 2022; Label: Nuclear Blast	23	2	3
The Nothing That Is	Released: October 25, 2024; Label: Nuclear Blast	—	9	—
"—" denotes a recording that did not chart or was not released in that territory.

EPs

Title	EP details	Peak chart positions
Title	EP details	AUS
Hell on Earth	Released: 2009; Label: Self-released	—
The Depression Sessions (split with The Acacia Strain and Thy Art Is Murder)	Released: 12 August 2016; Label: Nuclear Blast	38
The Aggression Sessions (split with Thy Art Is Murder and Malevolence)	Released: 7 April 2023; Label: Nuclear Blast	—
