= Will Putney =

American record producer and guitarist (born 1983)

- Born: William Scott Putney; May 29, 1983 (age 43)
- Origin: Sayreville, New Jersey, U.S.
- Genres: Metalcore; deathcore; hardcore punk; extreme metal
- Occupations: Musician; record producer
- Instrument: Guitar
- Years active: 2007–present
- Member of: Fit for an Autopsy; End; Better Lovers

William Scott Putney (born May 29, 1983) is an American record producer and musician based in New Jersey. He is the guitarist and co-founder of deathcore band Fit for an Autopsy, as well as the guitarist of metalcore supergroup End, and hardcore punk supergroup Better Lovers.

== Early life ==
Putney grew up in Sayreville, New Jersey. He began playing guitar as a teenager and formed his first band when he was 15. He studied biomedical engineering at the Stevens Institute of Technology.

== Career ==
=== Producing ===
Putney's music production career began when he met the producer Machine while interning at The Syndicate, a marketing music management and radio promotion company that shared the same building with Machine's studio, the Machine Shop. In 2007, he began working at the Machine Shop studio in Hoboken, New Jersey.

He and Machine moved the Machine Shop studio to Belleville, New Jersey, where they both worked until around 2013, when Putney took over the studio. Putney then expanded the Belleville facility and renamed it Graphic Nature Audio in 2015.

In 2015, he also co-founded his own record label Graphic Nature Records as an imprint of Equal Vision. Graphic Nature Audio is currently located in Kinnelon, New Jersey.

==== Genre ====
Putney works primarily in the metalcore, deathcore and hardcore punk genres. He has produced, mixed, and mastered many records for dozens of notable acts and bands, including Every Time I Die, The Amity Affliction, The Acacia Strain, Body Count, Thy Art Is Murder, Northlane, Gojira, Silent Planet, After the Burial, Terror, Unearth, Knocked Loose, Norma Jean, Fit for an Autopsy, Vein.fm, Harm's Way, Stray from the Path, and Counterparts.

He frequently works alongside engineers Randy LeBoeuf, Steve Seid, and Matt Guglielmo on his projects. In 2021, he was nominated and won a Grammy in the category of Best Metal Performance as producer for the song "Bum-Rush" by Body Count. In an interview with Metal Hammer, Body Count frontman Ice-T described Putney as "the Dr. Dre of metal."

=== Fit for an Autopsy ===
Will Putney is a founding member and current guitarist for the deathcore band Fit for an Autopsy. Although he is currently a member of the band, he has not played live with the band since around their first two albums, due to his busy schedule as a producer, although he still records guitar for the band in the studio and is the main songwriter for the band.

=== End ===
In 2017, Putney founded metalcore supergroup End, featuring current and former members of Counterparts, Shai Hulud, Misery Signals, Reign Supreme, Blacklisted, Trade Wind and Structures.

=== Better Lovers ===
In 2023, Putney joined hardcore punk supergroup Better Lovers, featuring former members of Every Time I Die and The Dillinger Escape Plan.

=== Other ventures ===
Putney has a signature plugin called Tonality: Will Putney through STL Tones, which recreates a variety of his guitar tones. He has a course with URM Academy titled How It’s Done w/ Will Putney, in which he demonstrates his production process by recording a song with Thy Art Is Murder. Putney also collaborated with Toontrack on Modern Metal EZX, an EZdrummer expansion pack.

== Discography ==
=== Fit for an Autopsy ===
Albums

- The Process of Human Extermination (2011)
- Hellbound (2013)
- Absolute Hope Absolute Hell (2015)
- The Great Collapse (2017)
- The Sea of Tragic Beasts (2019)
- Oh What the Future Holds (2022)
- The Nothing That Is (2024)

EPs

- Hell on Earth (2009)
- The Depression Sessions (split with The Acacia Strain and Thy Art Is Murder) (2016)
- The Aggression Sessions (split with Thy Art Is Murder and Malevolence) (2023)

=== End ===
Albums

- Splinters from an Ever-Changing Face (2020)
- The Sin of Human Frailty (2023)

EPs

- From the Unforgiving Arms of God (2017)
- Gather & Mourn (split with Cult Leader) (2022)

Live albums

- Bastard Reflection (2023)

=== Better Lovers ===
Albums

- Highly Irresponsible (2024)

EPs

- God Made Me an Animal (2023)

=== Bayonet ===
EPs

- Bayonet (2011)

=== When They All Fell ===
EPs

- A Sign of Things to Come (1999)
- Progression of Aggression (2001)

== Awards and nominations ==
Grammy Awards

Year	Nominee/work	Award	Result	Notes	Ref
2021	Bum-Rush	Best Metal Performance	Won	Producer	
