= Counterparts (band) =

Canadian melodic hardcore band

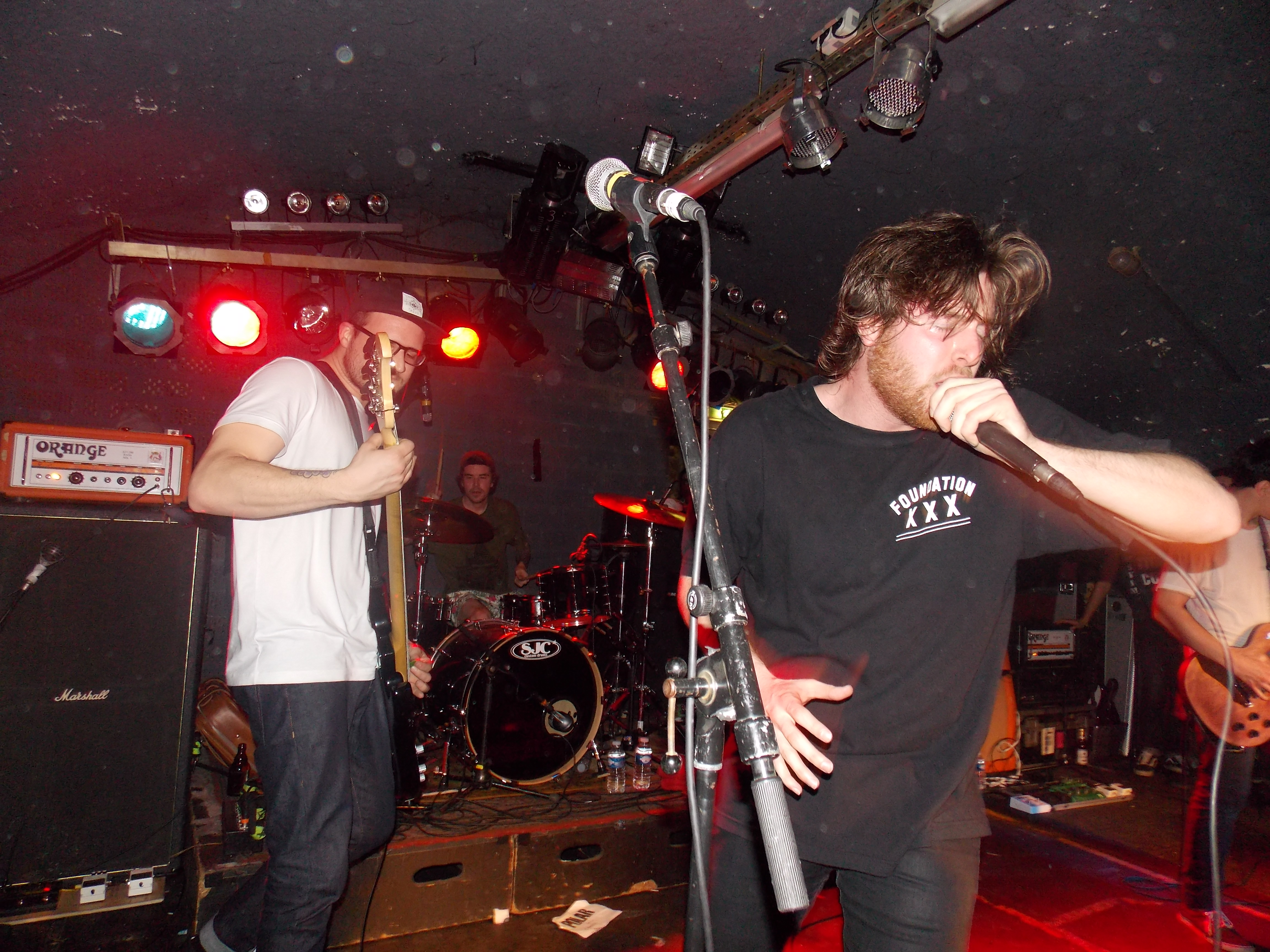
- Counterparts performing in 2014

Background information
- Also known as: Brigade (2007–2008); Sharia (2008)
- Origin: Hamilton, Ontario, Canada
- Genres: Srscore; metalcore; melodic hardcore; melodic metalcore
- Years active: 2007–present
- Labels: Victory; Verona; New Damage; Pure Noise
- Spinoffs: END; You Will Always
- Members: Brendan Murphy; Kyle Brownlee; Tyler Williams; Jesse Doreen
- Past members: Curtis Washik; Chris Needham; Ryan Juntilla; Adrian Lee; Eric Bazinet; Brian Kaczmarczyk; Kelly Bilan; Blake Hardman; Alex Re
- Website: counterpartsband.com

Counterparts are a Canadian metalcore band formed in 2007 in Hamilton, Ontario, that currently consists of vocalist Brendan Murphy, guitarist and bassist Tyler Williams and Jesse Doreen, and drummer Kyle Brownlee. Their two most recent albums, released through Pure Noise Records, have received critical acclaim from Rock Sound and Exclaim! magazines.

During the 2010s, alongside Hundredth and the Ghost Inside, they were a forefront act in a wave of bands merging melodic hardcore and metalcore, and are one of the leading forces in the metalcore revival wave.

== History ==
=== Formation and Prophets (2007–2010) ===
Formed in Hamilton, Ontario in 2007, the band were originally called Brigade, before briefly changing names to Sharia in 2008, then again in 2008 to Counterparts. The band name is derived from Alexisonfire's song "Counterparts and Number Them". The original line-up consisted of vocalist Brendan Murphy, guitarist Jesse Doreen, guitarist Curtis Washik, bassist Eric Bazinet, and drummer Ryan Juntilla. In 2009, Washik departed from the band, and Alex Re joined the band temporarily as their guitarist before becoming their permanent guitarist. In March 2009, Counterparts toured Canada. In 2010, Shane Told, from the band Silverstein, signed them to his Verona Records label.

Lead vocalist Brendan Murphy was featured on the song "The Artist" on Silverstein's fifth album, Rescue. He also appeared in their music video.

The band's debut album Prophets was released February 23, 2010, on label Verona Records. In 2010, Juntilla left the band, and was replaced by Chris Needham. A split EP, featuring Needham on drums was released November 21, 2010, with hardcore punk band Exalt. The band toured North America in support of the album.

=== The Current Will Carry Us (2011−2012) ===
In spring of 2011, the band was signed to Victory Records. The band continued to tour until the summer of 2011, when they announced that they were recording a new album. During this time, Needham left the band to see a speech therapist. A search for their next drummer was started, but ultimately, Juntilla rejoined the band, just in time to start recording for their second album, The Current Will Carry Us. The Current Will Carry Us was released October 24, 2011, on Victory. A music video was released for the song "Jumping Ship".

Music critic Andrew Kelham, of Rock Sound magazine, gave a rating of 8 to the album. He called it "brilliant" and stated that The Current Will Carry Us "is a great first impression for the many who are yet to become acquainted with the Canadian melodic-yet-frenetic hardcore quintet." Kiel Hume of Exclaim! magazine writes that Counterparts have the energy, talent, and attitude to wake up the genre. He states: "The Current Will Carry Us basically does that to a genre many people thought was on its last breath."

Kyle Brownlee, formerly of Canadian deathcore band Majesty, filled in for Juntilla for the entirety of the band's Canadian headliner tour, later on in summer of 2012, it was announced that Juntilla departed from Counterparts because he no longer wanted to be a part of the band. Days after the announcement, bassist Eric Bazinet commented on his Tumblr page that Juntilla had left the band in February and most of the members have not spoken to him since then. He had left to pursue interests in a band he was in during Counterparts. Bazinet added that on their last tour with Juntilla, "he was especially uninterested."

=== The Difference Between Hell and Home, Tragedy Will Find Us and lineup changes (2013−2016) ===
The band's third album The Difference Between Hell and Home was released on July 24, 2013, to positive critical reception. A music video for the track "Witness" was posted ten days prior to the release of the album.

In late 2013, guitarist Alex Re posted on his personal Facebook page that he had left Counterparts and would be playing his last show with the band at their hometown show in December. He was later replaced by Adrian Lee. In 2014, bassist Eric Bazinet announced that after seven years, he was leaving the band to pursue a career, and to spend time with family. After Bazinet's departure, Blake Hardman from Hundredth filled in on bass for the band on the Fuck the Message Tour that was headlined by Stick to Your Guns. Shortly afterwards, the guitarist of Kills and Thrills, Brian Kaczmarczyk, joined on bass, becoming the only non-Canadian member of the band.

In the spring of 2015, vocalist Brendan Murphy announced in an interview that their fourth album, Tragedy Will Find Us, was expected to be released in the summer of 2015. On April 23, the band announced that they have signed to Pure Noise Records, and New Damage Records. Pure Noise will release their upcoming album in the U.S., while New Damage will release it in Canada. The fourth album was released in July 2015. Tyler Williams, a bandmate of Hardman's in Nashville hardcore act on Point, also joined the band during this period. It was announced in March 2017 the band would play the 22nd annual Vans Warped Tour.

Counterparts entered the studio in March–April 2017, with Will Putney of Graphic Nature Audio at the production helm once again.

Vocalist Brendan Murphy announced that he started a new band with members of Fit For An Autopsy, Misery Signals and Reign Supreme called END. They released an EP called From the Unforgiving Arms of God.

=== You're Not You Anymore (2017−2019) ===
The band's fifth album, You're Not You Anymore, was released on September 22, 2017, via New Damage / Pure Noise Records. They have also shared singles from the album, called "Haunt Me", "Bouquet", and "No Servant of Mine".

You're Not You Anymore was the first recorded effort without the participation of Doreen due to his departure from Counterparts. The band did not let line-up changes derail their creativity and spirits. Playing an important role in the modern melodic hardcore scene, their new album is considered to have a different set of influences and a more refined sound.

=== Nothing Left to Love (2019–2021) ===
The band released their sixth studio album, Nothing Left to Love, on November 1, 2019, via New Damage / Pure Noise Records. The record marks the return of guitarist and backing vocalist Alex Re. Nothing Left to Love was the band's first record to break into the top 100 of the Billboard 200 charts, peaking at 97.

In 2021, frontman Brendan Murphy contributed guest vocals to the Hawthorne Heights single "Constant Dread".

=== A Eulogy for Those Still Here (2022–2024) ===
On May 31, 2022, Counterparts announced on all social media platforms their seventh studio album A Eulogy for Those Still Here would be released on October 7, 2022, through Pure Noise Records. The first single "Unwavering Vow" was released on June 1, 2022. The second single "Whispers of Your Death" was released on July 26, 2022. The third single "Bound to the Burn" was released on September 7, 2022.

=== Live in Toronto and Heaven Let Them Die (2024–present) ===
On July 30, 2024, Counterparts released their first ever live album, recorded in Toronto at the Danforth Music Hall with mixing and mastering by Kyle Brownlee. The recording took place during the "A Eulogy for Those Still Here Tour" on December 18, 2022, with support from SeeYouSpaceCowboy, Dying Wish, and Foreign Hands. Pure Noise Records released an accompanying video on YouTube of the band performing "Whispers of Your Death", "Bound to the Burn", and "A Mass Grave of Saints".

On November 7, 2024, the band surprise-released a new EP titled Heaven Let Them Die.

== Musical style and influences ==
Critics have categorised Counterparts' music as srscore, metalcore, melodic hardcore, emotional hardcore, melodic metalcore, and hardcore punk. The band's members have cited influences including Misery Signals, Shai Hulud, Comeback Kid, Poison the Well, Alexisonfire, Converge, Every Time I Die, Purity Ring, Saints Never Surrender, and Taken.

The band has been recognized for vocalist Brenden Murphy's intensely personal songwriting. Lyrical themes include seclusion, pessimism, grief, death, failed romance/relationships, and depression.

== Members ==
Current

- Brendan Murphy – lead vocals (2007–present)
- Kyle Brownlee – drums, percussion (2012, 2016, 2017–present)
- Tyler Williams – bass, backing vocals (2017–present); rhythm guitar (2022–present)
- Jesse Doreen – lead guitar (2007–2016, 2021–present); bass (2022–present); drum programming (2012)

Former

- Curtis Washik – rhythm guitar (2007–2009)
- Chris Needham – drums, percussion (2010–2011)
- Ryan Juntilla – drums, percussion (2007–2010; 2011–2012)
- Adrian Lee – rhythm guitar (2013–2019), bass (2017)
- Eric Bazinet – bass (2007–2014)
- Brian Kaczmarczyk – bass (2014–2017)
- Ben Leathem – drums, percussion (2016–2017)
- Kelly Bilan – drums, percussion (2012–2016)
- Alex Re – rhythm guitar, backing and clean vocals (2009–2013; 2019–2022)
- Blake Hardman – lead guitar, backing vocals (2016–2021); bass (2014, 2017)

Timeline

== Discography ==
Counterparts discography
- Studio albums: 7
- Extended plays: 4
- Live albums: 1
- Singles: 2
- Music videos: 12

=== Studio albums ===
- Prophets (2010)
- The Current Will Carry Us (2011)
- The Difference Between Hell and Home (2013)
- Tragedy Will Find Us (2015)
- You're Not You Anymore (2017)
- Nothing Left to Love (2019)
- A Eulogy for Those Still Here (2022)

=== Live albums ===
- Live in Toronto (2024)

=== EPs ===
- Counterparts – Untitled four-song EP (2008)
- Counterparts / Exalt Split (2010)
- Counterparts Live on Audiotree (2016)
- Private Room (2018)
- Heaven Let Them Die (2024)

=== Singles ===
- Selfishly I Sink (2018)
- Purer Form of Pain – Nothing Left to Love B-Sides (2020)

=== Music videos ===
- "Jumping Ship" (2011)
- "The Disconnect" (2012)
- "Witness" (2013)
- "Burn" (2015)
- "Collapse" (2015)
- "Stranger" (2016)
- "Bouquet" (2017)
- "Swim Beneath My Skin" (2017)
- "You're Not You Anymore" (2018)
- "Paradise and Plague" (2019)
- "Unwavering Vow" (2022)
- "Whispers of your Death" (2022)
- "A Martyr Left Alive" (2024)
- "No Lamb Was Lost" (2024)
